= Andrew Shore =

English operatic baritone

- Born: 30 September 1952 (age 73); Oldham, Lancashire, England
- Education: University of Bristol; Royal Northern College of Music; London Opera Centre
- Occupation: Operatic baritone
- Spouse: Fiona Macdonald (m. 1976)
- Children: 3 daughters
- Website: https://www.grovesartists.com/artist/andrew-shore/

Andrew Shore (born 30 September 1952) is an English operatic baritone.

== Life and career ==
Shore was born in Oldham, Lancashire. He studied at the University of Bristol, the Royal Northern College of Music and the London Opera Centre. In 1976 he married Fiona Macdonald; they have three daughters.

=== Early roles ===
Shore sang with Opera For All from 1977 to 1979. In 1979 he joined Kent Opera, for whom over the next six years he played buffo roles such as Antonio the gardener in The Marriage of Figaro and Dr Bartolo in The Barber of Seville. For Opera North he has sung a wide range of roles, from comic (Don Pasquale, Don Jerome in the first British production of Roberto Gerhard's The Duenna, Falstaff and Gianni Schicchi) to serious (Mr Flint in Billy Budd, and the title roles in King Priam and Wozzeck).

=== English National Opera ===
Having performed over 35 roles for English National Opera, Shore describes it as 'the closest thing to feeling like a home company for me.'

Roles have included Don Alfonso in Così fan tutte, Dulcamara in The Elixir of Love, Verdi's Falstaff and a role with which he is particularly associated, Dr Bartolo in The Barber of Seville. In modern works he has played Doeg in the British premiere of Philip Glass' The Making of the Representative for Planet 8. He has sung George Wilson in John Harbison's The Great Gatsby, Jacob Lenz in the opera of the same name by Wolfgang Rihm and Mr Punch in Punch and Judy by Harrison Birtwistle. In 2013 he played the seven baritone roles in Benjamin Britten's Death in Venice (also at the Dutch National Opera, Amsterdam) and in 2016, he sang Beckmesser in The Mastersingers of Nuremberg, a production which won 'Best New Opera Production' at the 2015 Laurence Olivier Awards.

=== National and international appearances ===
Shore made his Covent Garden debut in 1992, playing Baron Trombonok in Il viaggio a Reims. His most recent Covent Garden appearances were as Don Inigo Gomez in L'Heure espagnole in 2007 and 2009. For Glyndebourne he has played Baron Douphol in La traviata (1988), the Mayor in Jenůfa (1990), Mr Gedge in Albert Herring (1990), Falstaff (1990), Don Alfonso in Così fan tutte (1991), Dr Kolenaty in The Makropulos Affair (1995 and 1997), Dikój in Káťa Kabanová (1998), Bartolo in Le Nozze Di Figaro (2000 and 2012) and Krušina in The Bartered Bride.

Internationally, his Paris Opéra debut was in 1995, as the Sacristan in Tosca, and his US debut was in 1996, as Dulcamara at San Diego Opera. His Met Opera debut was as Dulcamara in 2006 and in 2007 he performed as Ulysses S. Grant in Philip Glass' Appomattox at San Francisco Opera. In 2003 he appeared as Hans Sachs in Opéra de Nantes' production of Die Meistersinger von Nürnberg. For the Lyric Opera of Chicago he has played Falstaff, Rossini's Bartolo, Frank in Die Fledermaus, Dikój, and Pooh-Bah in The Mikado.

Shore has sung the role of Alberich in Der Ring des Nibelungen at Bayreuth, the Liceu, Barcelona, the Teatro Colón, Buenos Aires and other houses.

== Recordings ==
For CD, Shore has recorded the roles of Bartolo in The Barber of Seville, the Sacristan in Tosca, Benoit and Alcindoro in La bohème, Dulcamara in The Elixir of Love and the title roles in Falstaff, Don Pasquale and Wozzeck.

For DVD, Shore appears as Dr Kolenaty in The Makropulos Case (Glyndebourne), Bartolo in Le nozze di Figaro (Glyndebourne) and multiple roles in Death in Venice (ENO).

== Awards and honours ==
Year	Awards	Category	Production	Outcome
1999	Laurence Olivier Awards	Outstanding Achievement in Opera	Gianni Schicchi and The Elixir of Love	Nominated
2011	Laurence Olivier Awards	Outstanding Achievement in Opera	The Elixir of Love	Nominated

On 28 January 2014, Shore was awarded an Honorary Doctor of Music by the University of Bristol.

On 8 December 2015, he was awarded a Fellowship of the Royal Northern College of Music.
