= Ava June =

British singer and opera singer (1931–2013)

- Born: Ava June Wiggins; 23 July 1931; Stepney, London, England
- Died: 22 February 2013 (aged 81); London, England
- Education: London Opera Centre
- Occupation: Opera singer
- Years active: 1953–1984
- Spouse: David Cooper (m. 1952; died 1982)

Ava June Wiggins (23 July 1931 — 22 February 2013) was an English opera singer noted for her roles with the Sadler's Wells Opera (now called the English National Opera). She joined the Opera in 1953 and switched from a mezzo to soprano on the persuasion of her teacher Clive Carey. June left the company in 1963 and also won a gold medal at the Sofia International Competition for young opera singers. She rejoined Sadler's Wells Opera seven years later and made her first performance in the United States in 1974 with the San Francisco Opera. June's last professional appearance as a singer came in 1983 and retired the following year to enter into a coaching role for the next generation of singers. She also taught with various musical organisations and brought her opera experience to directing productions until 1999.

== Biography ==
=== Early life and education ===
She was born Ava June Wiggins on 23 July 1931 at the East End Maternity Home, Commercial Road, in Stepney, East London. Her father, George Oliver Wiggins, was a tailor and carpenter and her mother, Violet Grace, was an employee of the Johnnie Walker whisky company. She was known to June to her family and was evacuated to Oxfordshire when World War II broke out.

Upon leaving school at the age of 14, June worked as a dressmaker at the Novello Theatre for the conductor's productions. While working on the costumes for King's Rhapsody, she met the composer in person and encouraged her to take formal lessons. June's first lessons came when she was 16 with the contralto Kate Opperman. In an interview in 2005, she described her as "the founder of my voice". She studied at the London Opera Centre and received coaching from the soprano Joan Cross. She later studied with the soprano Eva Turner and with bartone performers Denis Dowling and Clive Carey. It was at the school where June was introduced to the operas of Benjamin Britten.

=== Career ===
In 1953, when she adopted the stage name Ava June, she joined the Sadler's Wells Opera chorus. June was initially a mezzo but was later persuaded by her teacher Clive Carey to switch to soprano roles. She won the Queen's Prize at the Royal College of Music in 1955. June's performances in the chorus led to her appointment as a principal soloist for the 1957–58 season. Her solo career began with “a promising Musetta” in La bohème and followed this by playing The Foreign Women in The Consul by Gian Carlo Menotti. June's 1958 Covent Garden debut saw her perform as the Heavenly Voice in Luchino Visconti's production of Don Carlos by Giuseppe Verdi and was conducted by Carlo Maria Giulini. When Fidelio returned the next year under Rudolf Schwarz, June sang Marcellina and repeated this performance in 1960 but with Colin Davis as the conductor. That same year, she made her first (and only) appearance with the Royal Scottish National Orchestra under Alexander Gibson as Abigaille in Verdi's Nabucco with concert performances in Edinburgh and Glasgow. Also in 1960, June participated in a production of Georges Bizet's Les pêcheurs de perles with the tenor Charles Craig.

In 1961, she played the role of the May Queen in Edward German's Merrie England, and was Tatyana in Pyotr Ilyich Tchaikovsky's opera Eugene Onegin in the same year. The following year, June gained the part of Violetta in La traviata and followed this with a performance as a Marenka in The Bartered Bride and Micaëla in Carmen. Despite being firmly established, June travelled with the tenor Alberto Remedios to Bulgaria to take part in the Sofia International Competition for young opera singers, winning the gold medal, and giving her wider recognition. At the start of the 1963 season, she sang the part of Agathe in Der Freischütz, and the following year, with Davis conducting, played Ilia in Wolfgang Amadeus Mozart's Idomeneo. June sang Butterfly under Mario Bernardi towards the conclusion of 1964. She left Sadler Wells Opera in 1963. June's 1965 performance as the countess in the production of The Marriage of Figaro conducted by Charles Mackerras received strong praise from the critic Desmond Shawe-Taylor. The following year, she sang the part of Rosalinda in Die Fledermaus and later Lisa in The Queen of Spades. Other roles she played were Donna Elvira and Marzelline.

Her first performance with the Welsh National Opera came in 1968 as Marguerite in La traviata. June was united with her mentor Joan Cross the next year and reprised her 1965 performance of The Marriage of Figaro but with the Phoenix Opera. She later sang Donna Anna in Don Giovanni at the Coliseum in John Blatchley's production with Mackerras acting as the conductor. She rejoined Sadlers' Wells Opera in 1970 as a member of the London Coliseum ensemble. That same year, June sang Sieglinde in Die Walküre under Reginald Goodall and her voice was heard on the recording. She sang Frau Schomberg in the world premiere of Richard Rodney Bennett's Victory. June also made her first appearance in The Proms in 1970 by performing in Das Rheingold with Georg Solti as the conductor. She sang opposite Don Garrard as Judith in Bluebeard's Castle and then played Queen Elizabeth in Benjamin Britten's Gloriana in 1972. June reprised her role as Elizabeth but in Gaetano Donizetti's Maria Stuarda.

She made her first appearance in the United States in 1974 as Ellen Orford in a production of Britten's Peter Grimes with the San Francisco Opera, and also toured Germany and Eastern Europe. June performed in a 1976 production of Der Rosenkavalier and in that year's Hoffnung Music Festival, she stripped as Salone in Let's Fake an Opera, revealing herself to be Fidelio about to shoot Kenneth Woollam's Otello in Lohengrin's armour. Among her final assignments for the English National Opera (renamed from Sadler's Wells Opera in 1974), were the creations of roles for her of Grande Blanche in David Blake's Toussaint in 1977. June's final years with the English National Opera saw her return to mezzo-soprano rules, and she played the role as a strident Katy in Leoš Janáček's production Káťa Kabanová with Mackerras again acting as conductor. She created and played Countess Vronskaya in the world premiere of Iain Hamilton's Anna Karenina in 1981. June made her last appearance as a singer in a production of Richard Strauss's Der Rosenkavalier in 1983.

=== Later life and death ===
She retired from singing in 1984 after losing her voice and moved from Kensington to a quieter location in Twickenham Green. June passed on her experience to the younger generation of signers of the English National Opera as a coach and also gave masterclasses for several organisations including the International Association of Wagner Societies and the National Opera Studio. After stints with the Morley College, the Royal College of Music, Trinity Laban Conservatoire of Music and Dance and the Guildhall School of Music and Drama, she became a professor at the Royal Northern College of Music in Manchester in 1985 and remained in the post for the next fourteen years. June's pupils included Rosalind Plowright, Susan Bullock and Janice Kelly. She also brought her experience of opera to directing by creating productions of Charles Gounod's Roméo et Juliette, La traviata, and Nabucco for Wilmslow Opera in Cheshire. June also directed Die Fledermaus for the Carl Rosa Opera Company and latterly took on the direction of a choir of senior citizens for the University of the Third Age. Following the death of her husband of more than 30 years, the architectural engineer David Cooper in 1982, she became an active member of the London Spiritual Mission in Notting Hill Gate and became a soloist. June died at Kingston Hospital, London from sepsis brought about by an infection and pneumonia on 22 February 2013 at the age of 81.
