= Anne Sharp =

Scottish soprano opera singer

- Anne Sharp in costume as Juliet in the 1951 revival of the original production of Britten's The Little Sweep, photograph by Angus McBean
- Born: 24 October 1916; Motherwell
- Died: 25 August 2011 (aged 94); Edinburgh
- Education: Scottish National Academy of Music
- Occupation: coloratura soprano
- Organizations: English Opera Group

Anne Sharp (24 October 1916 – 25 August 2011) was a Scottish coloratura soprano particularly associated with the operas of Benjamin Britten.

== Background and education ==
Anne Smellie Graham Sharp was born in Motherwell, Lanarkshire, the eighth and youngest child in a family of keen amateur musicians. Her father was an engineer in the steel industry, and also an amateur singer and choirmaster. She attended Glencairn Primary School and Dalziel High School in Motherwell. After leaving school she worked as a secretary while taking private singing lessons, and in 1941 she began studying at the Scottish National Academy of Music in Glasgow, winning the Jean Highgate singing scholarship in 1943. During her years of study, which coincided with the Second World War, she also sang in the choir of Glasgow Cathedral. She gained the Performer's Diploma in Solo Singing from what was by then the Royal Scottish Academy of Music in 1944, and similar diplomas awarded by Trinity College London and The Royal Academy of Music in 1946.

In the summer of 1946 the Royal Opera House, Covent Garden, was re-establishing itself after the Second World War, and to this end a series of auditions was held in various centres around the country to recruit singers for the opera chorus. Sharp, who attended the Glasgow audition, was one of seven Scots who were successful. A contemporary newspaper article reported:

From among many hundreds of singers from all over the British Isles a chorus of 71 was chosen for the Royal Opera House, Covent Garden, London. Auditions were held in Glasgow and Edinburgh, and seven Scots qualified in the final selection. "This is the first time in its history that the 'Garden' has kept a 'resident' chorus," a representative of the company said. "It is hard to know if this is a record number of Scots". [...] Blonde, petite Anne Sharp gained many singing degrees at the Royal Scottish Academy of Music. She worked for Motherwell Corporation as a shorthand typist.

== London career ==
At the Royal Opera House, Sharp sang in the chorus in the first post-war production, Purcell's The Fairy Queen, then in the 1947 productions of Bizet's Carmen, Massenet's Manon and Mozart's The Magic Flute.

In March 1947 she became a founder member of Benjamin Britten's English Opera Group, singing Britten roles at Glyndebourne, Sadler's Wells, Lucerne, Scheveningen, Oslo and Copenhagen as well as the company's home base at Aldeburgh. Able to pass as a teenager even in her thirties, she sang the role of "tiresome village child" Emmie Spatchett in Albert Herring, the centrepiece of the first Aldeburgh Festival in June 1948.

She created the roles of (13-year-old) Cis Woodger in Albert Herring and Molly Brazen in Britten's 1948 adaptation of The Beggar's Opera, as well as Juliet Brook in The Little Sweep, a part written for her by Britten. In the play Let's Make an Opera! which precedes The Little Sweep, in which the characters were named for the original cast members, "Annie Dougall" (a bank clerk) who takes the part of the 14-year-old Juliet was originally played as a Scots girl, with the original libretto containing a number of Scots expressions for that character. Britten initially conceived the role of Polly Peachum in The Beggar's Opera for Sharp, but while composing the opera changed his concept of the character to a mezzo-soprano role. The part was eventually created by Nancy Evans.

Between 1948 and 1950 she appeared in live radio broadcasts of Albert Herring, Let's Make an Opera! and The Beggar's Opera on the BBC Third Programme and the BBC Home Service. In February 1950 Let's Make an Opera! was broadcast live on BBC television, one of the earliest televised operas.

Other performances during this period included the soprano solo parts in Bach's Mass in B minor, Handel's Messiah and A German Requiem by Brahms, and solo recitals for the BBC Third Programme including Handel's Lusinghe piu care and "Ständchen" by Richard Straus. Operatic roles included the Queen of the Night in Mozart's The Magic Flute and Micaëla in a concert performance of Bizet's Carmen. She created the title role in Lawrance Collingwood's little-known opera The Death of Tintagiles, at its only performance in April 1950.

== Vocal quality ==
Elisabeth Parry, a contemporary in the English Opera Group, described Sharp as having "... a lovely natural very high soprano voice, which never seemed to give her any problem. In our digs we used to tease her because she could get out of bed in the morning and lie in the bath singing up to E in alt." In 1950 the Totnes Times described "a charming presentation of the Queen of the Night." In 1957 the North Star reviewed her performance in Messiah as follows:

Miss Anne Sharp, soprano, heard for the first time in Tain, made an instant appeal, as might be expected from a singer of her calibre and reputation. What was most impressive was the enviable range of her sweet voice and its great purity in the upper register. All her solos put great demand on voice control and her rendering of the classic "I know that my Redeemer liveth" was a special joy.

== Marriage and later life ==
In December 1950, Sharp married Rev. James Lyon Kerr, a Church of Scotland minister. She continued her operatic career in London intermittently after her marriage, but after the birth of their daughter in 1953 concentrated on oratorio roles in Scotland.

In the last four years of her life, Sharp lived with her daughter in West Linton, Peeblesshire. She died in Edinburgh on 25 August 2011, aged 94.

== Recordings ==
- Molly Brazen, in the 1948 BBC radio original cast performance of The Beggar's Opera, issued by Pearl in April 2005.
- Emmie Spatchett, in a 1949 performance of Albert Herring recorded live at the Theatre Royal, Copenhagen, issued by Nimbus in September 2008.
- The 1949 BBC archive recording of Let's Make an Opera! with Anne Sharp in the dual role of Anne Dougall and Juliet Brook is not commercially available.
