= The Little Sweep =

Opera by Benjamin Britten

- Opera for children by Benjamin Britten
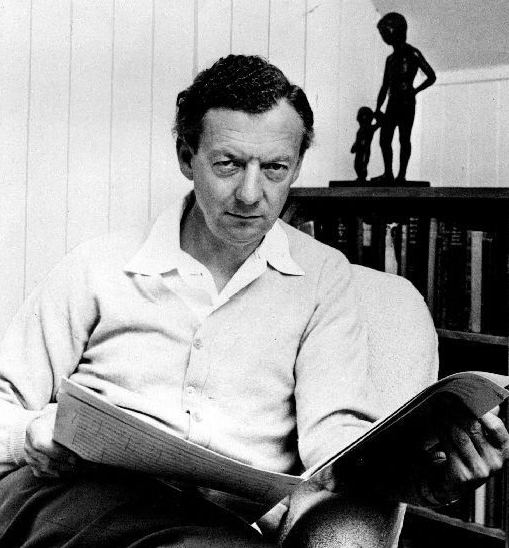
- The composer in 1968
- Librettist: Eric Crozier
- Language: English
- Based on: Songs of Innocence and of Experience by William Blake
- Premiere: 14 June 1949; Aldeburgh Festival

The Little Sweep, Op. 45, is an opera for children in three scenes by the English composer Benjamin Britten, with a libretto by Eric Crozier.

== Let's Make an Opera! ==
The Little Sweep is the second part of a stage production entitled Let's Make an Opera!. The first part takes the form of a play in which the cast portray contemporary amateur performers conceiving, creating and rehearsing the opera. Intended as an introduction to and demystification of the operatic genre, the play also provides an opportunity to rehearse the audience in the four "Audience Songs" they will sing after the interval.

The format of the play altered radically in the early months of its existence, passing through at least three versions (including one specially written for radio) utilising different approaches to the exposition. An initial version set "on the stage of any village hall" during an open dress-rehearsal for an already-written work morphs into one where the "Little Sweep" narrative is related by Gladys (Mrs. Parworthy) as a true story which happened to her grandmother, Juliet Brook, when Juliet was a fourteen-year-old in 1809 or 1810. In this telling the long-term happy ending is revealed, that Juliet's uncle (the father of the visiting Crome children) took Sammy the rescued sweep-boy on as a gardener's boy. Gladys's mother remembered him as "old Samuel Sparrow, the head gardener", who used to give her apricots on her birthday. The group of six adults (including the conductor) and six children choose this as the subject of their home-made opera, libretto by Anne Dougall, a young Scottish bank clerk, and music by Norman Chaffinch, an enthusiastic amateur. The opera is written, composed, cast, produced and rehearsed in the space of less than an hour.

The adult characters in the play were given the cast members' own first names and invented surnames, while the children originally had the first names of the children in the opera. For these, Britten used the names of the children and nephews of Fidelity Cranbrook, (wife of John Gathorne-Hardy, 4th Earl of Cranbrook), a personal friend of the composer's, whose family seat Glemham House lies a few miles inland from Aldeburgh, in Great Glemham close to Snape. In later versions of the play the children also acquired the names of the respective cast members, and Elisabeth Parrish became Pamela, to reflect the part of Rowan having been taken over by Pamela Woolmore, who originally understudied the role.

=== Composition history ===
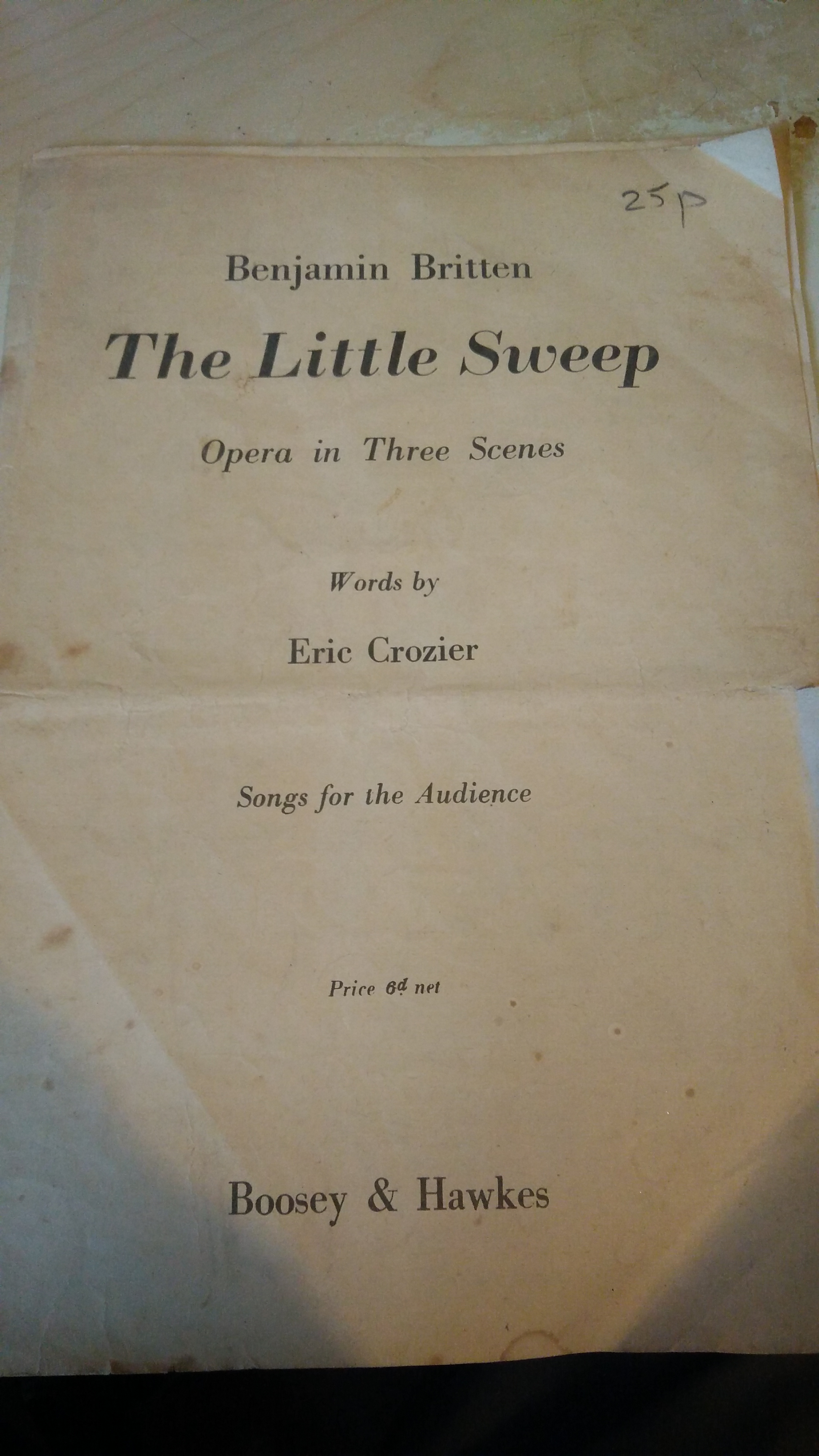
"Songs for the audience" booklet, handed to the audience in the original production.

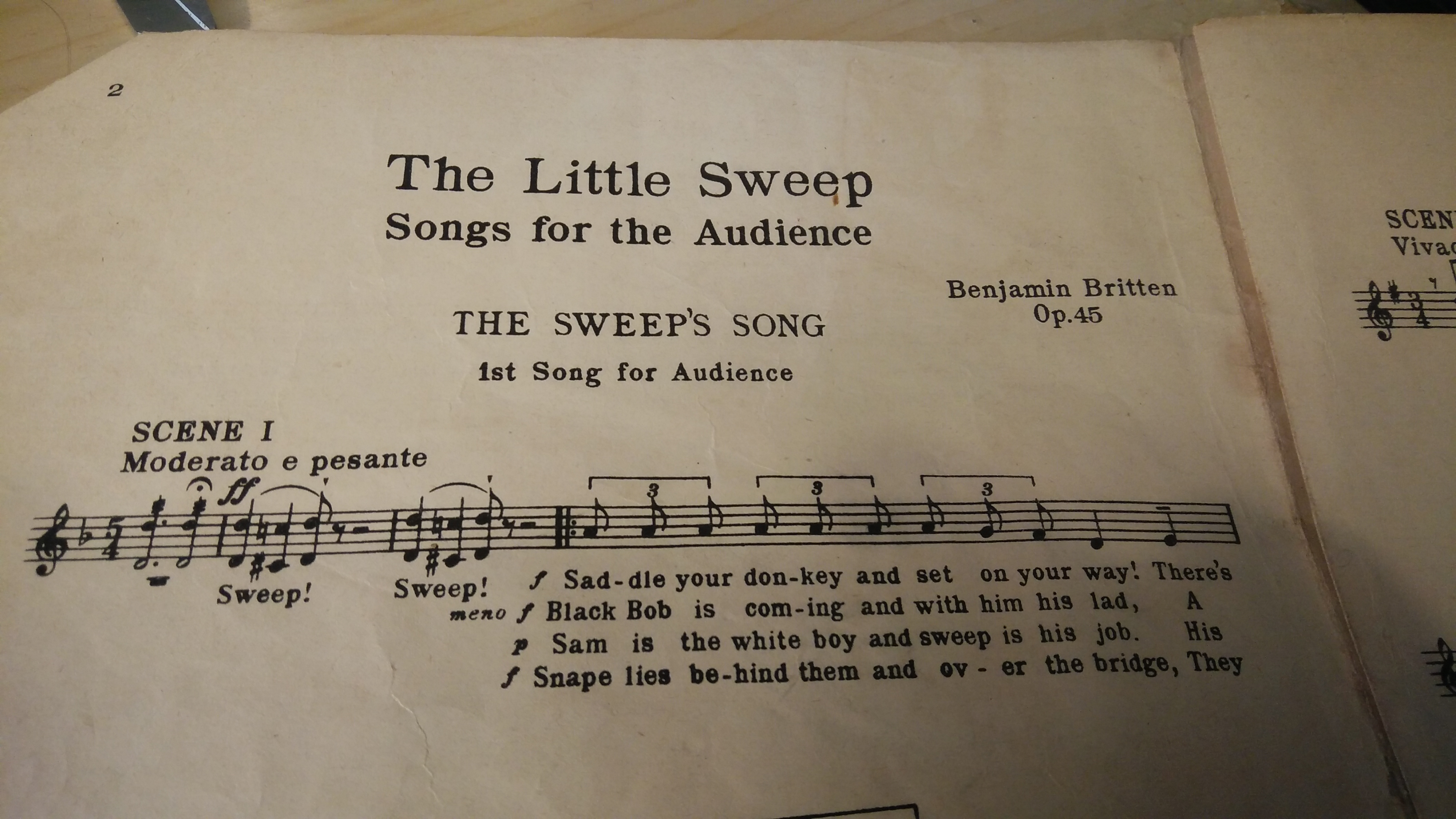
First page of the booklet.

Britten and Crozier had been thinking about a children's opera for some years, but only began to put the concept into practice in the autumn of 1948 when planning the programme for the second Aldeburgh Festival. One afternoon Britten suggested two Songs of Innocence and of Experience by William Blake, entitled "The Chimney Sweeper", and as Crozier relates, "by that evening we had planned the structure, action and characters of a short opera in three scenes."

As with Albert Herring, the opera which had opened the first Aldeburgh Festival, the action was to be set locally in Suffolk, this time in Iken Hall, a large rambling farmhouse on the banks of the river Alde, the home of Margery Spring Rice. The child characters were transplanted from a nearby country house, Glemham House in Great Glemham, which in the late eighteenth century had been the home of George Crabbe, the author of the poem The Borough which had formed the basis of Britten's 1945 masterpiece Peter Grimes. Glemham House was the home of Fidelity and Jock, Countess and Lord Cranbrook, personal friends of the composer's. Fidelity was at that time Chairman of the Aldeburgh Festival. Britten and Crozier adopted the names and personas of her children and nephews for the opera (although the children themselves were not involved in the production), and the opera is "affectionately dedicated to the real Gay, Juliet, Sophie, Tina, Hughie, Jonny and Sammy – the Gathorne-Hardy family of Great Glemham, Suffolk."

=== Musical forces ===
Vocal

The enthusiastic response of the audience to the congregational hymns incorporated in the cantata Saint Nicolas encouraged Britten and Crozier to build on this concept, and rely on the audience themselves to provide the chorus. The five adult parts (including that of Juliet, the eldest girl) were written for five members of the English Opera Group, and the remaining six children's parts were filled by boys and girls from the Ipswich Co-operative Society Choir.

Orchestral

Britten chose modest orchestral forces; string quartet (one instrument per part), piano duet (four hands on one piano), and percussion (cymbal, tenor drum and bass drum) requiring only one player. The vocal score, published by Boosey & Hawkes in 1950, incorporates a version for two pianos and percussion, with additional notation in the piano parts for use if the percussion instruments are unavailable.

== Performance history ==
The Little Sweep was the first of Britten's operas to be entirely conceived, composed and produced at Aldeburgh. Work continued throughout the spring and the first performance was given on 14 June 1949 in the Jubilee Hall. Imogen Holst describes "a hubbub of excited comment" from the first audience as even seasoned opera-goers raised their eyebrows at the standard expected of the audience/chorus ("What! In five-four?" "What? Diminished octaves?"), and the consternation of a "tall thin music critic" uncertain of the precise divisi required for the four birdsong choirs in the "Night Song". The performance was a huge success, with the final "Coaching Song" in which the children on stage improvised a coach using a rocking-horse, a couple of chairs, and two parasols for the wheels, hailed as a triumph.

== Roles ==
Roles in play and opera, voice types, premiere cast
Role (play)	Role (opera)	Voice type	Premier cast 14 June 1949
Grown-ups
Norman Chaffinch a zealous, enthusiastic amateur actor and producer	Black Bob a brutal sweep-master and Tom coachman from Woodbridge	bass	Norman Lumsden
Gladys Parworthy a kind, motherly neighbour of his with great experience of amateur acting	Miss Baggott housekeeper at Iken Hall	contralto	Gladys Parr
Elisabeth Parrish teaches English and Music at the local school and has helped the children write their opera; tall, pretty and eager	Rowan nursery-maid to the Woodbridge cousins	soprano	Elisabeth Parry
Anne Dougall has recently left school and works at the bank; friends with Elisabeth Parrish	Juliet Brook, aged 14 one of the children at Iken Hall	soprano	Anne Sharp
Max Westleton, office boy and odd job lad at Leiston Printing Works	Clem; Black Bob's son and assistant and Alfred gardener at Iken Hall	tenor	Max Worthley
The Conductor organist at the local church	conductor		Norman Del Mar
Children
Johnnie Chaffinch, aged 15 good at maths; knows all about fuses and circuits	Johnny Crome, aged 15 one of the Woodbridge cousins	treble	Peter Cousins
Tina Chaffinch, aged 8 small, quiet and timid	Tina Crome, aged 8 one of the Woodbridge cousins	treble	Mavis Gardiner
Gay Denton, aged 13 home from school for the holidays	Gay Brook, aged 13 one of the children at Iken Hall	treble	Bruce Hines
Sophie Stevenson, aged 11 cheerful girl with a big smile	Sophie Brook, aged 10 one of the children at Iken Hall	treble	Monica Garrod
Sammy Fisher, aged 8 choirboy at church; one of Miss Parrish's juniors	Sam ("Sammy") Sparrow, aged 8 Black Bob's new sweep boy	treble	John Moules
Hugh Lark, aged 8 also a choirboy and a junior	Hugh ("Hughie") Crome, aged 8 Tina's twin	treble	Ralph Canham

== Synopsis ==
Time: 1810

While their mother is absent "seeing papa off to join his ship", the three Brook children of Iken Hall have been playing host to their three Crome cousins, together with their nursery-maid. The visit is due to end the following day.

=== Scene 1 ===
The first Audience Song is sung before the curtain rises to reveal the children's nursery at Iken Hall, which Rowan the nursery-maid is covering in dust-sheets in preparation for a visit from the chimney sweeps. Miss Baggot, the elderly sharp-tongued housekeeper, escorts in Black Bob, the master sweep, and his son Clem, "a sullen apprentice as black as his dad". Last of all Sam trails in, a small white figure struggling with an armful of buckets and rope. While Miss Baggot gives the instructions, Rowan is shocked by the wretchedness of the little boy, and begs the sweeps not to send him up the chimney. The sweeps mock her and pallid white Sammy as they drive him up his first chimney, to be transformed into a black, "chimbley-stack" boy. Rowan runs from the room in distress, and the sweeps leave to prepare the next chimney.

The door opens and Juliet enters furtively, before climbing into an armchair and covering herself with a dust-sheet. The children are playing hide-and-seek, apparently the version known as sardines. Jonny finds Juliet and joins her in her hiding-place, but their game is interrupted by a cry of distress from Sammy, who has become stuck in the chimney. The commotion attracts the other four children, and they succeed in extricating the sweep-boy from his predicament while singing the shanty Pull the rope gently. Like Rowan, the children are horrified by Sammy's condition. They decide to hide him in the nursery while faking up a line of footprints to make it seem as if he has escaped through the window.

Miss Baggott and Rowan return with the sweeps, and are thoroughly taken in by the ruse. Black Bob and Clem run off in search of Sammy, pursued by Miss Baggott insisting that they get on with the job. Thinking herself alone, Rowan sings an aria (Run, poor sweep-boy) expressing her wish that she could help Sam escape. Overhearing this, the children gradually emerge from under the dust-sheets and set about persuading her to help them get Sam away from the sweeps. A decision is taken to feed him and bath him, and the curtain falls on the preparations for the bath.

=== Scene 2 ===
The second Audience Song is again sung to a closed curtain, vividly describing the splashing and scrubbing which is happening out of sight. The curtain rises to reveal Sam, "whiter than swans as they fly", and Juliet begins to question him about his background. He reveals that his father is a waggoner who broke his hip so that he couldn't work, and Sammy was sold into an apprenticeship with the sweeps because "there wasn't anything to eat". Sammy stoically declares that it was time he began work, as "I shall be nine next birthday", and the wealthy children become even more dismayed. Sam reveals that his home is in the village of Little Glemham, which by coincidence is also Rowan's home.

Jonny conceives the plan of smuggling Sam into his travelling-trunk so that he can be carried out of the house unseen when the Crome children leave the following day. Rowan agrees, just as Miss Baggott returns in a furious rage over her treatment by the sweeps, who have accused her of hiding their apprentice. There is a mad scramble to hide Sammy and look as innocent and natural as possible as Miss Baggott enters the room. At the spectacle of the grubby, sooty, untidy state of the nursery, the housekeeper's ire is redirected towards the children. Seeing toys lying around she approaches the toy-cupboard where Sammy is hiding, reaching for the door-handle. In desperation Juliet fakes a fainting fit, which has the desired effect. Everyone fusses around Juliet, who is eventually carried to her bedroom, as Jonny reassures Sam and urges him to "sit tight, and tomorrow you're a free man."

=== Scene 3 ===
The third Audience Song evokes the passing of the night. For this, the audience is divided into four groups, taking the parts of owls, herons, turtle-doves and chaffinches engaging in a singing competition. The curtain rises to reveal Juliet sitting in her dressing-gown, as Rowan enters carrying a tray with her breakfast. They call Sammy out of the cupboard and feed him Juliet's breakfast, while Juliet sings a charming farewell aria. Sammy tries to refuse the money Juliet gives him, but she is insistent. The other children enter, the three Cromes ready to leave for home. They pack Sammy into Jonny's trunk, with yet more food, only to run into a problem when it proves to be too heavy for Tom the coachman and Alfred the gardener to lift. The children and Rowan break into the growing argument between Miss Baggot and the men, and offer to help lift the trunk. The extra manpower does the trick, and Juliet, Gay and Sophie watch from the window as it is loaded into the coach taking Jonny and the twins away.

As soon as the coach has notionally departed, the entire cast returns to the stage for the Coaching Song. They form a tableau with a rocking-horse and chairs arranged to form a coach, and sing together with the audience, describing Sammy's journey to safety and freedom.

== Musical numbers ==
Number	Title	Cast
I	The Sweep's Song, Audience Song I.	Audience, later Clem and Bob
II	Quartet "Sweep the chimney!"	Miss Baggott, Rowan, Clem and Bob
III	Duet "Now the little white boy"	Clem and Bob
IIIa	Hide and Seek. "Juliet! Juliet!"	The Children
IV	Shanty "Pull the rope gently"	The Children
V	Ensemble "Is he wounded?"	Sam and the Children
VI	Marching Song	The Children, later Miss Baggott, Bob and Clem
VII	Trio	Miss Baggott, Bob and Clem
VIII	Aria "Run, poor sweep boy"	Rowan and later the Children
IX	Sammy's Bath, Audience Song II	Audience, later Rowan and the Children
X	Ensemble "O why do you weep?"	Sam, Rowan and the Children
XI and XII	Pantomime and Scena	Miss Baggott
XIII	Finale "Help! Help! She's collapsed!"	Rowan, Miss Baggott and the Children
XIV	The Night Song, Audience Song III	Audience
XV	Aria "Soon the coach will carry you away"	Juliet
XVI	Ensemble "Morning Sammy"	Sam and the Children
XVII	Trio and Ensemble "Ready, Alfred?"	Alfred, Tom, Miss Baggott, later Rowan and the Children
XVIII	Coaching Song, Audience Song IV	Omnes and Audience

== Recordings ==
(Conductor/Juliet/Rowan/Sam/Baggott/Clem/Black Bob)

- Del Mar/Sharp/Woolmore/Moules/Parr/Worthley/Lumsden (1949) BBC archive performance, no commercial release
- Britten/Cantelo/Vyvyan/Hemmings/Thomas/Pears/Anthony (1956), Decca
- Kares/Pokorná/Sormová/Prusek/Mixová/Procházka/Hanus (1975, in Czech), Supraphon
- Ledger/Benson/Wells/Monck/Begg/Tear/Lloyd (1977), HMV
- Juzeau/Vautier/Kapeluche/Soula?/Murano/Battedou/Legendre (1979, in French), Adès
- Halsey/Milne/Flowers/Yeo/Palmer/Graham-Hall/Richardson (1996, Weigl movie), Arthaus
