= Anne Wood (opera administrator) =

British opera singer and administrator

- Born: 2 August 1907; Crawley, Sussex, England
- Died: 12 June 1998 (aged 90); Westminster, London, England
- Partner: Johanna Peters
- Musical career
- Genres: Opera
- Instrument: Vocals (mezzo-soprano)
- Formerly of: BBC Singers; English Opera Group

Anne Wood (2 August 1907 – 12 June 1998), was a British mezzo-soprano singer and opera administrator.

== Early life ==
Anne Wood was born on 2 August 1907 at The Grange, Crawley, Sussex, the daughter of Percival Wood, JP for Sussex, and his wife, Eleanor. She was educated at St Mary's School, Calne, and studied singing alongside Elena Gerhardt, George Parker, and Eve de Reussy.

== Career ==
In 1934, Wood joined the BBC Singers, at the same time as Peter Pears, who was to become her lifelong friend. Wood was the other soloist in Pera's first commercial recording, Peter Warlock's Corpus Christi Carol in 1936.

During the Second World War, she was employed by the Ministry of Economic Warfare to work on black propaganda, as she was a fluent in the German language. By night she drove an ambulance. Wood also worked for the Council for the Encouragement of Music and the Arts, later ENSA; and was an ambulance driver during the evening.

After the War, Wood returned to her career and was a "leading mezzo-soprano", and a "resourceful interpreter" of contemporary and modern music. She sang in many premières, including in 1950, Benjamin Britten's Spring Symphony in Amsterdam.

In 1948, Wood was one of the prime movers in the creation of the English Opera Group, and was its general manager until 1951, working alongside Britten, John Piper, and Eric Crozier.

In 1949, together with the soprano Joan Cross, Wood formed the Opera Studio, the first school in the UK to train opera singers; and by 1952 it had become the London Opera School, and in 1959, the National School of Opera, and later, London Opera Centre.

For many years, she and her long-term companion, Scottish mezzo-soprano Johanna Peters (1932–2000) ran Phoenix Opera, a touring company. She also taught at Guildhall School of Music.

== Later life ==
Wood died on 12 June 1998 at the Hospital of St John and St Elizabeth, Westminster, London.
