= Anna Pollak =

English opera singer (1912–1996)

- Born: 1 May 1912; Manchester
- Died: 28 November 1996 (aged 84); Hythe, Kent
- Occupation: opera singer
- Partner: Erica Marx

Anna Pollak OBE (1 May 1912 – 28 November 1996) was an English opera singer who sang leading mezzo-soprano roles primarily with the Sadlers Wells Opera Company and the English Opera Group. She created several roles in 20th century operas including Bianca in Benjamin Britten's The Rape of Lucretia and Lady Nelson in Lennox Berkeley's Nelson.

== Life and career ==
Pollak was born in Manchester to an Austrian father and Russian mother and spent part of her childhood in the Netherlands. After finishing her education in Manchester, she began working as a stage actress and as a singer in musical comedy, pantomime, and revues. During World War II she worked for ARP, the British civil defense organisation, and entertained British troops at ENSA concerts. After the war, she auditioned for the newly re-opened Sadlers Wells Opera. She had no formal musical training, let alone training in opera, apart from encouragement and advice from the conductor Lawrance Collingwood and the soprano Joan Cross who was the manager of Sadlers Wells.

Pollak made her debut as an opera singer in 1945 singing Dorabella in the Sadlers Wells production of Così fan tutte and remained as a leading member of the company until 1962 while also appearing with the English Opera Group as well as at Glyndebourne and the Royal Opera House. She returned to Sadlers Wells as a guest artist in 1966 when she gave what critic Elizabeth Forbes called "a hallucinatory performance" as the old Countess in The Queen of Spades and again in 1968 as Calliope in the Sadler's Wells production of Orpheus in the Underworld (her final performance of the opera stage). Pollak was appointed an Officer of the Order of the British Empire in 1962.

Pollak died in Hythe, Kent at the age of 84. Her lifelong companion, Erica Marx, had died in 1969.
