= Nancy Evans (mezzo-soprano) =

English mezzo-soprano

Nancy Evans (1915-2000)

Nancy Evans OBE (19 March 1915 – 20 August 2000) was an English mezzo-soprano who had a notable career as a concert and opera singer. She is particularly associated with Benjamin Britten who wrote his song cycle, A Charm of Lullabies, and the role of Nancy in his opera Albert Herring for her.

== Biography ==
Evans was born in Liverpool on 19 March 1915 to Florence and Thomas Herbert Evans. She was the second of their three children. She was educated at Calder High School for Girls there. After studying singing first with John Tobin and later with Maggie Teyte and Eva de Reusz, she made her recital debut in Liverpool at the age of 18. In 1935 her father arranged a private recording of her singing by Decca and this led to her taking the part of Dido in the premiere recording of Purcell's Dido and Aeneas with Roy Henderson as Aeneas, under Boyd Neel. Initially a recital and concert singer, she made her stage debut in 1938 in Arthur Sullivan's The Rose of Persia at the Prince's Theatre in London, which was followed by a series of small roles at Royal Opera House. During World War II, she sang throughout Europe and the Middle East in ENSA concerts for the British armed forces.

After the war ended, she joined Benjamin Britten's newly formed English Opera Group. Her first important opera role was Lucretia in the 1946 Glyndebourne production of Britten's The Rape of Lucretia. The following year she created the role of Nancy in his Albert Herring, also at Glyndebourne, and in 1948 she sang Polly in Britten's version of The Beggar's Opera.

After her retirement, Evans taught singing at the Britten-Pears School in Snape Maltings, and was made an OBE in 1991. She died in Aldeburgh at the age of 85.

== Personal life ==
Her first husband was the record producer Walter Legge, whom she married in 1941. The couple had one daughter, born in 1942, but divorced in 1948. In 1949, Evans married the producer and librettist Eric Crozier, who became a co-founder of the Aldeburgh Festival with Britten and Peter Pears.

== Sources ==
- Daily Telegraph, "Nancy Evans", 24 August 2000
- Kennedy, Michael and Bourne, Joyce (eds.), "Evans, Nancy", The Concise Oxford Dictionary of Music, Oxford University Press, 2007. ISBN 978-0-19-920383-3
- McDonald, Tim, "Obituary: Nancy Evans" The Guardian, 24 August 2000
