= English Opera Group =

UK musical group

The English Opera Group was a small company of British musicians formed in 1947 by the composer Benjamin Britten (along with John Piper, Eric Crozier and Anne Wood) for the purpose of presenting his and other, primarily British, composers' operatic works. The group later expanded to present larger-scale works, and was renamed the English Music Theatre Company. The organisation produced its last opera and ceased to run in 1980.

== English Opera Group ==
Fleeing internal politics at Sadler's Wells Opera at the end of 1945, Britten and singers Joan Cross, Anne Wood, and Peter Pears joined with designer Piper and producer Crozier to found the English Opera Group. The new company's goal was to première Britten's operas, and to present other, mostly British, small-scale operas. The company's first project was to première Britten's chamber opera Albert Herring and give further performances of his opera The Rape of Lucretia during a tour of British and continental European venues. It also commissioned and premièred a new piece by Lennox Berkeley, a setting of the Stabat Mater. Despite heavy subsidies, however, the costs of touring could not be recouped, so Britten and the group's other directors decided that it should be based at a home venue. This was the prime reason for the inauguration of the Aldeburgh Festival in 1948.

The first opera commissioned by the group, Brian Easdale's The Sleeping Children, was premièred in 1951. It gave the North American première of Britten's The Turn of the Screw at Canada's Stratford Festival in 1957. Aside from other new works by Britten, the group commissioned and produced eleven other new operas by British composers. It also gave the British première of Francis Poulenc's opera Les mamelles de Tirésias in 1958. The group also performed older operas, such as Acis and Galatea, The Beggar's Opera, Idomeneo, Iolanta, La rondine and Trial by Jury, and works by Henry Purcell and Gustav Holst.

The Royal Opera, London took over management of the group in 1961. In 1971 Steuart Bedford was appointed musical director, and Colin Graham became director of productions.

== English Music Theatre Company ==
In 1975 the group was enlarged to be able to produce works such as operettas and musicals in addition to opera. As well as appearing at festivals such as Aldeburgh, the company undertook regional tours and yearly performance seasons at the Sadler's Wells Theatre in London. The founder and leader of the company was Colin Graham. One of their 1976 productions was The Threepenny Opera by Kurt Weill, conducted by the young Simon Rattle. After a final production of Britten's A Midsummer Night's Dream in 1980, the company was disbanded.

== Operas premiered (not including Britten's) ==
Year	Opera	Composer
1951	The Sleeping Children	Brian Easdale
1954	A Dinner Engagement	Lennox Berkeley
1956	Ruth	Lennox Berkeley
1964	English Eccentrics	Malcolm Williamson
1967	The Bear	William Walton
	Castaway	Lennox Berkeley

Year	Opera	Composer
1968	Punch and Judy	Harrison Birtwistle
1969	Purgatory	Gordon Crosse (written 1966)
	The Grace of Todd	Gordon Crosse
1972	The Visitors	John Gardner
1974	The Voice of Ariadne	Thea Musgrave

=== English Music Theatre Company ===
Year	Opera	Composer
1976	Tom Jones	Stephen Oliver
1978	La Cubana	Hans Werner Henze (written 1973)
	Transformations	Conrad Susa
1979	An Actor's Revenge	Minoru Miki

== Prominent former members ==
- Janet Baker
- James Bowman
- Owen Brannigan
- Joan Cross
- Eric Crozier
- Nancy Evans
- Kathleen Ferrier
- Sylvia Fisher
- Colin Graham
- Heather Harper
- Della Jones
- Thomas Lawlor
- Norman Lumsden
- Benjamin Luxon
- Peter Pears
- Anthony Rolfe Johnson
- John Shirley-Quirk
- Robert Tear
- Jennifer Vyvyan
- Olive Zorian
