= Frederick Sharp (baritone) =

Frederick Sharp (October 19, 1911, Mansfield Woodhouse – April 20, 1988, Tadworth, Surrey) was an English baritone. Trained as a singer at the Royal College of Music, he made his debut in 1946 at the Glyndebourne Festival Opera as Junius in Benjamin Britten's The Rape of Lucretia. In 1947 he created the role of Sid in the world premiere of Britten's Albert Herring. He went on to sing thirteen seasons with the Sadler's Wells Opera; portraying such roles as Germont in La traviata, Paolo in Simon Boccanegra, Scarpia in Tosca, and the title roles in Eugene Onegin, Don Giovanni and Rigoletto among others. His final appearance with Saddler's Wells was in 1960.
