= Le Rosier de Madame Husson =

Le Rosier de Madame Husson

Le Rosier de Madame Husson is a novella by Guy de Maupassant, published in 1887. The hero is a young virtuous boy, the equivalent of a Rose Queen.

The story was adapted by the English composer Benjamin Britten for his comic opera Albert Herring with a libretto by Eric Crozier who transposed it entirely to an English setting.

== Plot ==
Madame Husson, the model of virtue in Gisors, is promoting chastity in her town by seeking to crown a rosière (i.e. Rose Queen, a girl of unimpeachable virtue). However, no girl can stand up to the investigations that take place, and Madame Husson crowns the village idiot, Isidore, as the 'rosier' (Rose King). He uses his reward to "slum it" in Paris.

== Film adaptations ==
- 1931 : Le Rosier de Madame Husson by Bernard Deschamps (80 minutes)
- 1931 : La Déchéance d'Isidore, played by Fernandel, silent
- 1950 : Le Rosier de Madame Husson by Jean Boyer (84 minutes). Marcel Pagnol, writer of the screenplay, imagines that the character of Bourvil, is sponsored by a lady patroness.
- 2008: Le Rosier de Madame Husson, played by Marie-Anne Chazel as part of the series Chez Maupassant on France 2.
