= Margaret Ritchie (soprano) =

English singer (1903–1969)

Margaret Ritchie (1903–1969) was an English soprano who sang opera, oratorio and song. She created a number of operatic roles. In 1946 she was the first Lucia in The Rape of Lucretia by Benjamin Britten, and in 1947 she was the first Miss Wordsworth in the same composer's Albert Herring.

She was one of four singers, together with Elisabeth Schwarzkopf, Oda Slobodskaya and Tatiana Makushina, to record a selection of Nikolai Medtner's songs accompanied by the composer: theirs was the premier recording of the Sonata-Vocalise Op. 41 No. 1, which is introduced by a setting of the poem "Geweihter Platz" by Goethe.

Her discography includes, in addition to the two Britten operas mentioned above, Elmira in George Frideric Handel's Sosarme conducted by Anthony Lewis (1954) and Galatea in Handel's Acis and Galatea conducted by Walter Goehr (1951). She recorded two solo recitals, both accompanied by George Malcolm on piano/harpsichord: one on the Nixa label includes art songs Henry Purcell, Henry Bishop, William Boyce, Thomas Arne, Wolfgang Amadeus Mozart, and Franz Schubert, and the other on the His Master's Voice label includes lieder of Schubert and Joseph Haydn.

In the 1945 film Pink String and Sealing Wax, set in the 1880s, she played the part of real-life singing star Adelina Patti.

She also sang on the soundtrack of the 1948 film Scott of the Antarctic, whose score was composed by Ralph Vaughan Williams.
