= Nelson (opera) =

Nelson is an opera in 3 acts by Lennox Berkeley to a libretto by Alan Pryce-Jones. The opera centres on the love affair of Horatio Nelson, 1st Viscount Nelson and Emma, Lady Hamilton. Completed in 1951, it was first performed in full in 1954.

== Background ==
Berkeley began work on Nelson in 1949. In 1950 he was invited by Rear-Admiral Charles Lambe to be a guest of the Royal Navy Home Fleet on its spring cruise through the waters where the Battle of Trafalgar, Nelson's final battle, had been fought. Berkeley was provided with two grand pianos in his cabin (enabling the composer and Lambe, who was an accomplished pianist, to play duets), and the fleet slowed down between Cape St. Vincent and Cape Trafalgar to enable the composer to drink in the scene of Nelson's final moments.

The opera had a partial performance, to piano accompaniment, at the Wigmore Hall in London in 1953, when the part of Nelson was sung by Peter Pears. Critics received this well, but the reviews of the full version a year later, staged at Sadler's Wells Theatre with the encouragement of Benjamin Britten, were mixed. This may have been because Britten's own The Turn of the Screw also premiered around the same time, inevitably invoking comparisons. It may also have affected critics that earlier in 1954, Berkeley's second, and very different, opera, the surrealistic comedy A Dinner Engagement, had been premiered; this successful one-act work remains the only one of Berkeley's operas to have held the stage.

Nelson had only nine performances in the 1954/5 season. In 1965 the composer wrote 'I should now want to rewrite so much of it if it were to be revived. I do think it has good things in it, but I'm not satisfied with it as a whole.' Nevertheless, a concert performance at the Queen Elizabeth Hall in 1988 evoked more positive critical consensus.

The work is in the tradition of heroic opera, with typical features such as love duets, a letter scene, and large-scale finales to some of the scenes. Berkeley's style, reflecting his studies with Nadia Boulanger, also enables him to deal effectively with lighter moments of satire and comment.

== Roles ==
Role	Voice type	Premiere Cast, 22 September 1954 (Sadler's Wells Theatre, London, conductor: Vilém Tauský)
Mrs. Cadogan	mezzo-soprano	Sheila Ross
Lord Nelson	tenor	Robert Thomas
Lady Nelson	mezzo-soprano	Anna Pollak
Sir William Hamilton	baritone	Arnold Matters
Emma, Lady Hamilton	soprano	Victoria Elliott
Lord Minto	baritone	Stanley Clarkson
Captain Hardy	bass	David Ward
Madame Serafin	contralto	Olwen Price
Chorus: Guests, townspeople, sailors

== Synopsis ==
=== Act 1 ===
Naples, 1798. The palazzo of the English ambassador, Sir William Hamilton. At a grand reception, the fortune-teller Mme. Serafina prophesies to Nelson that he will have to choose between love and duty. He meets Emma, and they realise that they love each other.

=== Act II ===
==== Scene I ====
Dover Street, London, 1800. Nelson's wife chides him with his passion for Emma, but Emma herself declares her love for him.

==== Scene II ====
August 1805, a few weeks before the Battle of Trafalgar. A garden in Nelson's country retreat, Merton Place, outside London. Lord Minto and Captain Hardy advise Nelson to end his affair with Emma, which has become the talk of the town. Emma arrives and the lovers pledge their affection, but at this moment a summons arrives to instruct Nelson to take command of the Fleet.

=== Act III ===
==== Scene I ====
Outside the George Inn, Portsmouth. Nelson is boarding his ship, the H.M.S. Victory. He and Emma bid each other farewell.

==== Scene II ====
A cabin in the Victory during the Battle of Trafalgar. The dying Nelson is brought to the surgeon who is dealing with the injured. Nelson's last thoughts are of Emma.

==== Scene III ====
The garden in Merton Place. Hardy brings the news of Nelson's death to Emma. She recalls Serafina's prophecy.

Berkeley also wrote an alternative ending whereby an orchestral postlude follows scene II.

== Recording ==
A 1983 BBC studio broadcast was issued on the Lyrita label in 2022. The performers are David Johnston (Nelson), Eiddwen Harrhy (Emma Hamilton), Margaret Kingsley (Lady Nelson), Brian Rayner Cook (Hamilton), Elizabeth Bainbridge (Mrs Cadogan), Richard Angas (Hardy), Mary Thomas (Madame Serafin), Eric Shilling (Lord Minto), the BBC Symphony Orchestra, BBC Singers, conducted by Elgar Howarth.

== Sources and notes ==
- Carl Dahlhaus (ed.), Pijpers Enzyklopädie des Musiktheaters, Munich. 1986 (in German)
- Peter Dickinson, The Music of Lennox Berkeley, London, 2003
