= Eric Crozier =

British theatrical director and producer (1914–1994)

Eric Crozier OBE (14 November 1914 – 7 September 1994) was a British theatrical director, opera librettist and producer, long associated with Benjamin Britten.

== Early life and career ==
Crozier was born in London and studied at the Royal Academy of Dramatic Art and at the British Institute in Paris, working as a translator and giving English lessons. In Paris he joined Jacques Copeau's La Compagnie des Quinze, known for championing experimental drama. Returning to England, he became one of the first drama producers for BBC Television, a position that his friendship with the actor Stephen Haggard helped him to obtain. Productions during that time included Turn Round (1937) and Telecrime (1938). Crozier joined the Old Vic theatre, working with Tyrone Guthrie, then moved during the war to the Sadlers Wells Opera Company where he directed Smetana's The Bartered Bride in 1943 with Peter Pears in the lead role.

== Association with Britten ==
The association with Benjamin Britten began when Crozier directed his first opera, Peter Grimes, which had its world premiere at Sadler's Wells on 7 June 1945. Although this was both a critical and a commercial success there were many difficulties over its staging, including objections both to the music and to Britten's pacifism. Crozier fiercely defended the opera, and after the premiere he resigned from the company due to the lukewarm support he had received from the management.

Instead, Crozier founded the English Opera Group in 1947, and co-founded (with Britten) the Aldeburgh Festival in 1948. He directed his second wife, Nancy Evans, in the role of Lucretia in the 1946 premiere of Britten's opera The Rape of Lucretia at Glyndebourne, and later succeeded Peter Pears as director of the Aldeburgh Festival. His first opera libretto for Britten was Albert Herring (1947). He wrote the librettos for the cantata Saint Nicolas (1948), the children's opera Let's Make an Opera (1949), and (with E.M Forster) Billy Budd at Covent Garden in 1951.

Crozier and Britten eventually fell out permanently, and in Imogen Holst's 1966 biography of Britten he is not mentioned at all. This, claims Jim Coyle, "not only calls into question Holst's objectivity; it serves to illustrate Britten's implacable lack of forgiveness on occasions". Something very similar happened to another Britten librettist, Ronald Duncan.

== Other work ==
Crozier wrote the libretto for Ruth, a 1956 sacred opera by Lennox Berkeley, after the Old Testament Book of Ruth. He also worked closely with Arthur Bliss, contributing the words for his Cradle Song for a Newborn Child (1964) as well as helping him with the proofs and advising on the content of his biography As I Remember (1970). Crozier translated many opera librettos into English, including The Bartered Bride, La Traviata, Otello and Falstaff (with Joan Cross), and Idomeneo, Salome and Die Frau ohne Schatten.

== Personal life ==
Crozier was married twice: first in 1936 to stage designer and actress Biddy Crozier (born Ada Margaret Johns, 1915–2004) with whom he had two daughters, and then to the mezzo soprano Nancy Evans in 1949. (Evans' first husband was the record producer Walter Legge). In retirement he and Nancy lived at Great Glemham, not far from Snape Maltings, and they were both appointed OBEs in the 1991 New Year Honours list. The Eric Crozier and Nancy Evans archives are preserved at Aldeburgh. He died after a long period of ill-health at Granville in France.
