= Steuart Bedford =

English conductor and pianist (1939–2021)

Steuart John Rudolf Bedford OBE (31 July 1939 – 15 February 2021) was an English orchestral and opera conductor and pianist.

He was the brother of composer David Bedford and of singer Peter Lehmann Bedford and a grandson of Liza Lehmann and Herbert Bedford; his parents were Leslie Bedford, an inventor, and Lesley Duff, a soprano opera singer.

Bedford was particularly associated with the music of Benjamin Britten, and conducted the world premiere of Death in Venice in 1973. Bedford also conducted Britten's other operas, and made an orchestral suite of music from Death in Venice. Between 1974 and 1998, he was one of the artistic directors of the Aldeburgh Festival. In 1989, he became joint artistic director with Oliver Knussen. In the summer of 2013, Bedford conducted a performance of Peter Grimes which was staged in its natural setting on the beach at Aldeburgh. His book Knowing Britten, compiled through his conversations with the tenor Christopher Gillett, was published in June 2021 by the Britten Press.

His other work in contemporary opera included conducting the 1996 world premiere in Monte Carlo of Lowell Liebermann's The Picture of Dorian Gray, and also the 1999 US premiere.

Bedford conducted several commercial recordings of Britten operas, including the first recording of Death in Venice (Decca), as well as The Turn of the Screw (Collins Classics, since reissued on Naxos). He also recorded his Death in Venice suite and the major vocal cycles by Britten.

Bedford made his operatic conducting debut in February 1964 at the Oxford Playhouse with Britten's Albert Herring.

Bedford was appointed Officer of the Order of the British Empire (OBE) in the 2016 New Year Honours for services to music.

He was married twice: first to the soprano Norma Burrowes, which ended in divorce in 1980, and secondly to Celia Harding, who predeceased him in 2020. Bedford's elder daughter Charmian Bedford is an operatic soprano working internationally, and his younger daughter Joanna Bedford is an Education Producer at Opera North.

He died on 15 February 2021, aged 81.
