= Albert Herring =

1947 opera by Benjamin Britten

- Chamber opera by Benjamin Britten
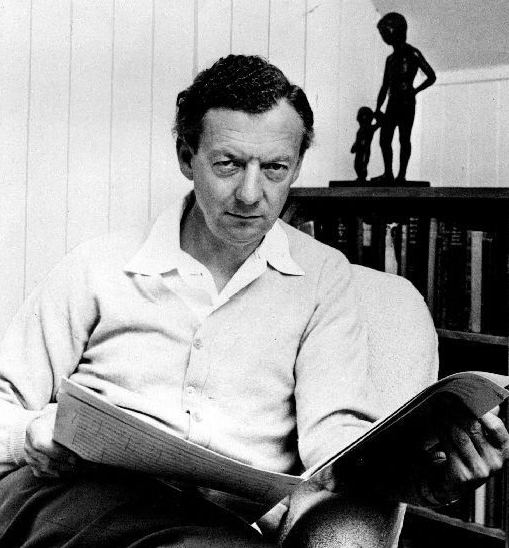
- The composer in 1968
- Librettist: Eric Crozier
- Language: English
- Based on: Le Rosier de Madame Husson by Guy de Maupassant
- Premiere: 20 June 1947; Glyndebourne Festival Opera

Albert Herring, Op. 39, is a chamber opera in three acts by Benjamin Britten.

Composed in the winter of 1946 and the spring of 1947, this comic opera was a successor to his serious opera The Rape of Lucretia. The libretto, by Eric Crozier, was based on Guy de Maupassant's novella Le Rosier de Madame Husson, with the action transposed to an English setting.

== Composition history ==
After having composed and staged The Rape of Lucretia, Britten decided he should attempt a comedy, preferably set in England. Crozier suggested adapting the Maupassant short story Le rosier de Madame Husson and transplanting it to the Suffolk landscape already familiar to Britten from his home in Snape. Britten composed Albert Herring at his home, The Old Mill at Snape, in the winter of 1946 and the spring of 1947. He scored the opera for the same instrumental forces he had used in his first chamber opera The Rape of Lucretia, intending it like the earlier opera for performance by the English Opera Group.

== Performance history and reception ==
The opera premiered on 20 June 1947 at Glyndebourne, conducted by the composer. According to one writer, the owner and founder of Glyndebourne, John Christie, "disliked it intensely and is said to have greeted members of the first night audience with the words: 'This isn't our kind of thing, you know'." Some 38 years later Glyndebourne's 1985 production was "one of the most successful the opera has had".

The opera received its U.S. premiere on 8 August 1949 at the Tanglewood Music Festival. In 1949, Britten's English Opera Group toured with both Rape of Lucretia and Albert Herring, giving ten performances between 12 and 23 September in Copenhagen and Oslo. An almost complete recording of one of the Copenhagen performances has been released commercially.

Sviatoslav Richter called it "the greatest comic opera of the century" and in 1983 staged Albert Herring as part of the December Nights Festival at Moscow's Pushkin Museum.

The opera was performed at Buenos Aires's Teatro Colón in 1972. The Chicago premiere was given by Chicago Opera Theater in 1979. In 2008–2010, over 55 performances were given by companies such as those at Glyndebourne and the Portland Opera in Oregon (2008 season); the Opéra-Comique in Paris and the Opéra de Normandie in Rouen (2009);and, for 2010, at the Landestheater in Linz, the Finnish National Opera in Helsinki and the Santa Fe Opera. The Santa Fe production was given by the Los Angeles Opera in 2011. Vancouver Opera presented the work, in a co-production with Pacific Opera Victoria, in 2013.

== Australian television production ==
Australian television aired a live performance in 1959. This was at a time when Australian TV productions were rare.

== Roles ==
Role	Voice type	Premiere cast, 20 June 1947 (Conductor: Benjamin Britten)
Lady Billows, an elderly aristocrat	soprano	Joan Cross
Florence Pike, her housekeeper	contralto	Gladys Parr
Miss Wordsworth, a schoolteacher	soprano	Margaret Ritchie
Mr. Gedge, the vicar	baritone	William Parsons
Mr. Upfold, the mayor	tenor	Roy Ashton
Superintendent Budd	bass	Norman Lumsden
Sid, a butcher's assistant	baritone	Frederick Sharp
Albert Herring, from the greengrocer's	tenor	Peter Pears
Nancy, from the bakery	mezzo-soprano	Nancy Evans
Mrs. Herring, Albert's mother	mezzo-soprano	Betsy de la Porte
Emmie	soprano	Lesley Duff
Cis	soprano	Anne Sharp
Harry	treble	David Spenser

== Synopsis ==
Time: April and May 1900
Place: Loxford, a small market town in East Suffolk, England

=== Act 1 ===
Act I, scene 1, from a production at the Badisches Staatstheater Karlsruhe, 1960-61. Featured are Manfred Röhrl, Hannelore Wolf-Ramponi, Eugen Ramponi, Greta Holm, Brigitte Otto, and Rudolf Werner.

Housekeeper Florence Pike is run ragged. Her mistress Lady Billows is organising the annual May Day festival and has gathered all the important people of the village to elect the May Queen. But Florence has dug up dirt on every single girl nominated, proving that none is worthy to wear the once-much-coveted crown. Lady Billows is depressed. Superintendent Budd suggests that the solution may be to select, this year, a May King instead. He knows of a young man in town who is as certainly virginal as the girls are not: Albert Herring.

Working at the greengrocer's, Albert is teased for his timidity by the easygoing butcher Sid. Sid's girlfriend Nancy comes in to do some shopping, and the couple shares a tender moment while Albert looks on. The lovers leave, and Albert reflects on his miserable existence under his mother's thumb. The Festival Committee arrives with the news of his selection as May King. Mrs. Herring is thrilled by the prize of £25, but Albert balks at being paraded in swan-white and mother and son quarrel to the mocking commentary of the village children.

=== Act 2 ===
It is the day of the festival. Sid and Nancy are preparing the banquet tent, and they take the opportunity to slip some rum into Albert's lemonade glass. Together with a crown of flowers and the gruesome but improving Foxe's The Book of Martyrs, Albert is awarded twenty-five pounds in prize money. Asked to make a speech, he is tongue-tied and becomes an object of pity at the feast in his honour, but after draining his lemonade glass (which Britten satirically underlines with a Tristan chord, alluding to the philter in that opera). and having a fit of hiccups he manages a few hip-hip, hurrahs.

That night, Albert arrives home alone and quite drunk. In the street, Sid keeps a rendezvous with Nancy, and the two discuss their sympathetic pity for Albert before going off together. This is the breaking point for Albert, who has overheard. He takes the prize money and heads out looking for adventure.

=== Act 3 ===
The next morning Albert has not returned, and the village is in a panic. Superintendent Budd is leading the search, while the guilt-stricken Nancy tends to Mrs. Herring. A boy shouts that a "Big White Something" has been found in a well, and the village worthies file in to break the news en masse that Albert's crown of flowers has been discovered, crushed by a cart. A lengthy threnody of grief follows, but is interrupted by the surprise return of Albert. He thanks the Festival Committee for funding his night out. They, in turn, are outraged by his tale of drunken debauchery and leave in a huff. Albert finally stands up to his mother and invites the village children into the shop to enjoy some fruit at his expense.

== Musical style and character themes ==
Act II, from a 1959 production at the Théâtre Sarah Bernhardt, Paris.

Act III, from a production at the Badisches Staatstheater Karlsruhe, 1960-61. Featured are Maria Graf, Albert van Haasteren, Eric Marion, Anke Naumann, Rudolf Werner, Manfred Röhrl, Greta Holm, Brigitte Otto, Hannelore Wolf-Ramponi, and Eugen Ramponi.

Albert Herring is a musically complex work, despite its somewhat light-hearted subject matter. The text is genuinely humorous, and the score, while matching the text in character, includes myriad musical quotations as well as some complex forms. Like Peter Grimes and other works by Britten, this opera explores society's reaction to an odd individual, although, in this case at least, it is from a generally humorous and lighthearted perspective. Some of Britten's contemporaries saw in the title character a satirical self-portrait of the composer.

== Recordings ==
There are five audio recordings of Albert Herring and one DVD recording, with the following artists:

Year	Cast: (Albert, Lady Billows, Sid, Nancy, Mrs Herring, Florence Pike, Miss Wordsworth, Mr Gedge, Mr Upfold, Superintendent Budd)	Conductor, Orchestra, Notes	Label, Cat. No., Year (re)issued
1949	Peter Pears*, Joan Cross*, Denis Dowling, Nancy Evans*, Catherine Lawson, Gladys Parr*, Margaret Ritchie*, Otakar Kraus, Roy Ashton*, Norman Lumsden*	Benjamin Britten, English Opera Group Orchestra (Live recording of a performance in the Theatre Royal, Copenhagen, on 15 September): Members of the original cast.	Nimbus; NI 5824/6 (2008)
1964	Peter Pears, Sylvia Fisher, Joseph Ward, Catherine Wilson, Sheila Rex, Johanna Peters, April Cantelo, John Noble, Edgar Evans, Owen Brannigan	Benjamin Britten, English Chamber Orchestra	Decca; 421,849–2 (1989)
1985	John Graham-Hall, Patricia Johnson, Alan Opie, Jean Rigby, Patricia Kern, Felicity Palmer, Elizabeth Gale, Derek Hammond-Stroud, Alexander Oliver, Richard Van Allan	Bernard Haitink, London Philharmonic Orchestra (Video recording of a performance at the Glyndebourne Festival Opera); Director: Peter Hall; Designer: John Gunter	Warner Music Vision; 5046 78790-2
1996	Christopher Gillett, Josephine Barstow, Gerald Finley, Ann Taylor, Della Jones, Felicity Palmer, Susan Gritton, Peter Savidge, Stuart Kale, Robert Lloyd	Steuart Bedford, Northern Sinfonia	Naxos Records; 8.660170/8 (2003)
1996	Christopher Pfund, Kirsten Dickerson, Samuel Hepler, Nancy Maria Balach, Barbara Kokolus, Tara Venditti, Lynette Binford, Scott Bearden, James Powell, Scott Altman	David Gilbert, Manhattan School of Music Orchestra	Vox Records; VXP2 7900
2001	James Gilchrist, Susan Bullock, Roderick Williams, Pamela Helen Stephen, Anne Collins, Sally Burgess, Rebecca Evans, Alan Opie, Robert Tear, Stephen Richardson	Richard Hickox, City of London Sinfonia	Chandos; CHAN 10036 (2003)
