= Death in Venice (opera) =

Opera by Benjamin Britten

- Opera by Benjamin Britten
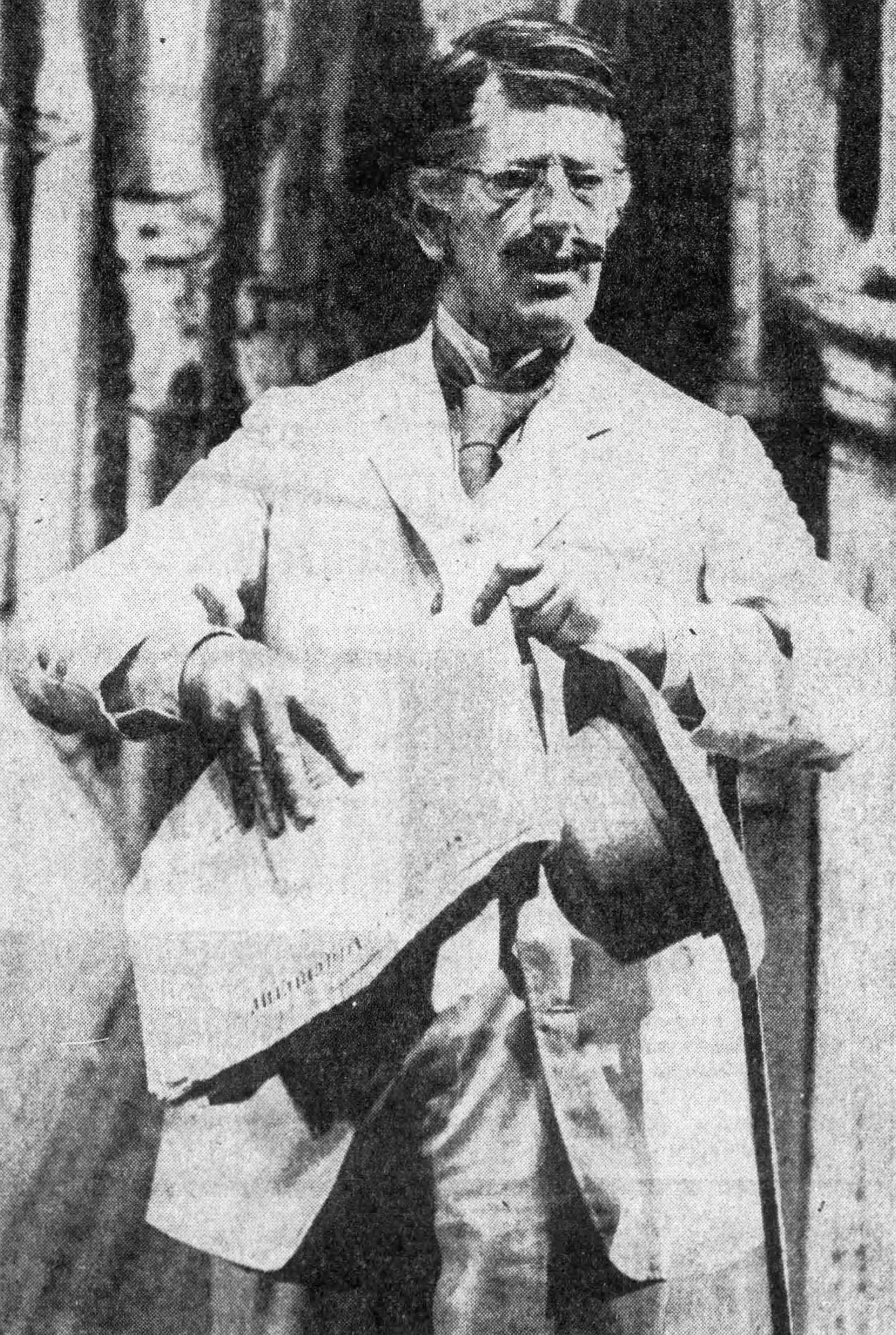
- Peter Pears as Aschenbach in 1974
- Librettist: Myfanwy Piper
- Language: English
- Based on: Der Tod in Venedig by Thomas Mann
- Premiere: 16 June 1973; Aldeburgh Festival

Death in Venice, Op. 88, is an opera in two acts by Benjamin Britten, his last. The opera is based on Death in Venice, a novella by Thomas Mann. The opera's libretto is by Myfanwy Piper. Her husband John Piper designed the sets. It was first performed at Snape Maltings, near Aldeburgh, England, on 16 June 1973.

The often acerbic and severe score is marked by some haunting soundscapes of "ambiguous Venice". The boy Tadzio is portrayed by a silent dancer, to gamelan-like percussion accompaniment.

== Composition history ==
Britten had been contemplating the novella for many years and began work in September 1970 with approaches to Piper and to Golo Mann, son of the author. Because of agreements between Warner Brothers and the estate of Thomas Mann for the production of Luchino Visconti's 1971 film, Britten was advised not to see the movie when it was released. According to Colin Graham, director of the first production of the opera, some colleagues of the composer who did see the film found the relationship between Tadzio and Aschenbach "too sentimental and salacious". This contributed to the decision that Tadzio and his family and friends would be portrayed by non-speaking dancers. Ian Bostridge has noted themes in the work of "formalism in art and the perilous dignity of the acclaimed artist".

== Roles ==
Role	Voice type	Premiere cast, 16 June 1973 (Conductor: Steuart Bedford)
Gustav von Aschenbach, a novelist	tenor	Peter Pears
Traveller/ Elderly fop/ Old gondolier/ Hotel manager/ Hotel barber/ Leader of the players/ Voice of Dionysus	baritone	John Shirley-Quirk
The Polish mother	(dancer)	Deanne Bergsma
Tadzio, her son	(dancer)	Robert Huguenin
Her two daughters	(dancers)	Elisabeth Griffiths and Melanie Phillips
Jaschiu, Tadzio's friend	(dancer)	Nicolas Kirby
Voice of Apollo	countertenor	James Bowman
Hotel porter	tenor	Thomas Edmonds
Boatman	baritone	Michael Bauer
Hotel waiter	baritone	Stuart Harling
Russian mother	soprano	Alexandra Browning
Russian father	bass	Michael Follis
German mother	mezzo-soprano	Angela Vernon Bates
Strawberry seller	soprano	Iris Saunders
A guide	baritone	Robert Carpenter Turner
Lace seller	soprano	Sheila Brand
Newspaper seller	soprano	Anne Wilkens
Glassmaker	tenor	Stephen James Adams
Strolling player	tenor	Neville Williams
Strolling player	mezzo-soprano	Penelope Mackay
English clerk	baritone	Peter Leeming
Nurse-governess	soprano	Anne Kenward
Chorus – travellers, workers and dancers

== Synopsis ==
Place: Venice and Munich
Time: 1911

=== Act 1 ===
Scene 1: Munich

Aschenbach, a famous German novelist, is weary and opens the opera bemoaning the fading of his artistic inspiration. As he walks through the suburbs of Munich, he stops before the entrance to a cemetery. He catches sight of a traveller ("from beyond the Alps by his looks") and, musing on the strange and exotic nature of foreign lands, is impulsively moved to travel south in the hope of refreshing his artistic imagination.

Scene 2: On the Boat to Venice

He takes a boat to Venice, sharing his passage with a group of libidinous youths and their leader, the Elderly Fop. Aschenbach's discovery that the fop is not young, but old and made-up ("How can they bear that counterfeit; that young-old horror. A wretched lot, a wretched boat") repulses him, and he arrives in Venice dispirited.

Overture: Venice

Scene 3: The Journey to the Lido

Aschenbach contemplates his arrival by gondola into the city ("What lies in wait for me here, Ambiguous Venice, Where water is married to stone, And passion confuses the senses?"). He intends to go to the Schiavone, but is taken towards the Lido by the Old Gondolier, who mutters that "Nobody shall bid me; I go where I choose; I go my own way". A brief argument as to their destination ensues, but the novelist soon capitulates and is taken to the Lido.

Scene 4: The First Evening at the Hotel

Aschenbach is greeted by the Hotel Manager, who shows him his room with ingratiating volubility. As the other guests assemble for dinner, Aschenbach watches them pass. His eye is taken by a young Polish boy, Tadzio, in whom he sees unnatural beauty ("Surely the soul of Greece; Lies in that bright perfection; ...Mortal child with more than mortal grace"). Aschenbach is aware of the fatuousness of his thoughts, but allows himself to indulge in his speculations.

Scene 5: On the Beach

Reading on the beach, Aschenbach observes Tadzio playing on the sands. He obtains a wry satisfaction from the discovery that Tadzio has flaws: as a Pole, the boy hates the Russian guests ("He is human after all. There is a dark side even to perfection. I like that").

Scene 6: The Foiled Departure

Walking the streets of Venice, Aschenbach is accosted at every turn by beggars, street sellers and others demanding his custom. Seeing rubbish on the streets and smelling the foul water of the canals, he feels nauseated and claustrophobic, and decides that he must leave Venice. Back at the hotel, the Manager expresses his regret over Aschenbach's departure. When Tadzio returns Aschenbach's glances, Aschenbach himself also feels regret. On arriving at the station, Aschenbach finds that his luggage has been sent on the wrong train ("I am furious because I am forced to return, but secretly I rejoice. Vacillating, irresolute, absurd"), and he realises upon seeing Tadzio again that the boy was the cause of his regret at leaving.

Scene 7: The Games of Apollo

Aschenbach sits in his chair on the Lido beach, watching Tadzio and his friends play. Aschenbach's thoughts (voiced by the chorus) are of the gods Phaedra, Apollo and Hyacinthus, their actions mirroring those of Tadzio. The boys compete in a variety of sports: running, long jump, discus, javelin and wrestling. Tadzio wins conclusively, and Aschenbach is inspired artistically by the boy's beauty, as "...thought becomes feeling, feeling thought". Aschenbach determines to congratulate Tadzio on his victory, but when the opportunity arises, he cannot bring himself to speak. Almost choking on the words, Aschenbach realises the truth: "I – love you".

=== Act 2 ===
Sitting with a book but distracted by his own thoughts, Aschenbach decides to accept his feeling for the boy as it is: "ridiculous, but sacred too and no, not dishonourable, even in these circumstances".

Scene 8: The Hotel Barber's Shop (i)

Aschenbach visits the Hotel Barber, who lets slip a mention of a sickness in Venice. Aschenbach questions urgently, but the barber denies that the sickness is of any importance.

Scene 9: The Pursuit

As Aschenbach crosses the waters to Venice, he detects the smell of disinfectant. On his arrival, he finds citizens reading public notices warning them to take precautions against infection. The citizens too deny that there is any cause for worry, but Aschenbach finds a graver warning in a German newspaper: "We doubt the good faith of the Venetian city fathers in their refusal to admit to the cases of cholera in the city. German citizens should return as soon as possible." The Polish family appears and Aschenbach determines that they must not find out about the cholera outbreak for fear that they will leave. Aschenbach follows the family to a café, where the mother notices him and moves herself in between Aschenbach and her son. The family moves onward to St Mark's, with Aschenbach still following at a distance. In due course, the family leaves and takes a gondola back to the hotel, with Aschenbach in pursuit and in a state of some excitement: "Tadzio, Eros, charmer, see I am past all fear, blind to danger, drunken, powerless, sunk in the bliss of madness."

Scene 10: The Strolling Players

On the hotel terrace after dinner, the guests assemble to watch the players. Aschenbach questions the Leader of the Players about the rumours of plague, but the actor dismisses his suggestions. Aschenbach notices that Tadzio, like himself, is not laughing at the skit, and wonders "Does your innocence keep you aloof, or do you look to me for guidance? Do you look to me?"

Scene 11: The Travel Bureau

A young English clerk is dealing with a crowd of hotel guests, all urgently trying to leave Venice. As the clerk closes the bureau, Aschenbach asks him about the plague and is told that the city is in the grip of Asiatic cholera. He advises Aschenbach to leave immediately before a blockade is imposed.

Scene 12: The Lady of the Pearls

Aschenbach decides to warn Tadzio's mother of the danger posed to them by the plague, but cannot bring himself to do it. He initially chastises himself for having failed to "make everything decent and above board", but then decides that he was right not to speak out, and idly wonders "What if all were dead, and only we two left alive?"

Scene 13: The Dream

Aschenbach dreams of the gods Apollo and Dionysus, who argue their respective viewpoints of reason and beauty versus chaos and ecstasy. Apollo is overwhelmed and leaves Dionysus to a wild dance. Aschenbach wakes and realises how little of his former intellectual rigour and detachment remains. He is resigned to the change: "Let the gods do what they will with me".

(The music for Apollo in this scene derives from the First Delphic Hymn, an early Greek melody Britten heard Arda Mandikian sing at the 1954 Aldeburgh Festival.)

Scene 14: The Empty Beach

Aschenbach watches as Tadzio and his friends play a desultory game on the beach; they soon leave.

Scene 15: The Hotel Barber's Shop (ii)

Aschenbach declares "Do what you will with me!" and the barber works at beautifying him with make-up and hair dye, extolling the virtues of youthful appearance the while.

Scene 16: The Last Visit to Venice

Aschenbach boards a gondola for Venice and sings of its beauty. He realises and mocks his own resemblance to the Elderly Fop. Upon seeing the Polish family ahead of him, Aschenbach follows distractedly. Tadzio detaches himself from the family and waits for Aschenbach, who turns away when the boy looks directly at him. Aschenbach is pleased to notice that Tadzio does not betray his follower's presence to his mother. Alone again, Aschenbach buys strawberries from a street seller, but finds them musty and over-ripe. He sits down, tired and ill, and bitterly mocks himself ("Self-discipline your strength... All folly, all pretence"). He recites a paraphrase of Plato's dialogue between the old philosopher Socrates and the boy Phaedrus, speaking the parts of both man and boy. The subject of the dialogue is the paradoxical, dangerous relationship between the artist and his subject.

Scene 17: The Departure

The Hotel Manager and a porter are organising the departure of the last guests, the Polish family among them. Aschenbach inquires as to their time of departure, then leaves to sit on the deserted beach where Tadzio and another boy, Jaschiu, are playing. The game becomes rougher and Jaschiu dominates, pushing Tadzio's face into the sand. In an attempt to assist, Aschenbach tries to get up but is too weak. Jaschiu and the other children run away, leaving Tadzio on the beach alone with Aschenbach. Tadzio beckons the author, but he slumps in his chair. Tadzio continues walking far out to sea.

== Film ==
In 1981, Tony Palmer made a film of the opera, shot in Venice. The Australian tenor Robert Gard sang the principal role as Peter Pears was too ill, but the other major roles were sung by their creators (John Shirley-Quirk and James Bowman), and the English Chamber Orchestra was conducted by the original conductor Steuart Bedford.
