= London Opera Centre =

The London Opera Centre, a school for the training of opera singers and other opera professionals, existed in England between 1963 and 1978. It was located in the former Troxy Cinema on Commercial Road in London's East End Borough of Stepney (now Tower Hamlets). The Troxy, with 3,520 seats, opened in 1933 and was one of England's largest cinemas. As a result of wartime damage and the general decline of the area, the cinema closed in November 1960.

The English singer Joan Cross, an important figure in British opera at Sadler's Wells, who guided the company through the Second World War, and others had formed the National School of Opera in 1948, but its impact was limited due to little or no language teaching or technical stagecraft. (Nonetheless, its alumni included many successful artists such as Ava June, Marie Collier, Inia Te Wiata, Johanna Peters, April Cantelo and the D'Oyly Carte's Kenneth Sandford.)

By 1963, the Arts Council of Great Britain had provided a £27,900 grant to set up the London Opera Centre to provide musical and dramatic training to young voice students who were offered two-year scholarships. It was to be located in the Troxy and managed out of the Royal Opera House, Covent Garden as a rehearsal space as well as an opera school. Among the most famous of the former students was the soprano Dame Kiri Te Kanawa who was offered an opportunity to study there between 1966 and 1968 after winning a major vocal competition in New Zealand. In addition, the Centre was used for other aspects of stagecraft and technical training, scenery construction and storage. A 500-seat theatre was created in the balcony for occasional performances, although rehearsal needs tended to take precedence over the Centre's needs for its own student performances.

While on the Board of the Centre, Joan Cross and others resigned a year later because they did not feel that the association with the Royal Opera House benefited the Centre. Gradually, several factors caused dissatisfaction with the Centre's activities, its high cost and remote location being the most important ones. By the time the lease came up for renewal in July 1977, the Opera House was willing to abandon the Troxy in favour of a smaller National Opera Studio at the Opera House itself. This was set up in 1978 under the opera singer Michael Langdon.

== Bibliography ==
- Gilbert, Susie and Shir, Jay, A Tale of Four Houses: Opera at Covent Garden, La Scala, Vienna and the Met since 1945, London: HarperCollinsPublishers, 2003 ISBN 0-00-255820-3
