= Punch and Judy (opera) =

1968 chamber opera by Harrison Birtwistle and Stephen Pruslin

- Chamber opera by Harrison Birtwistle
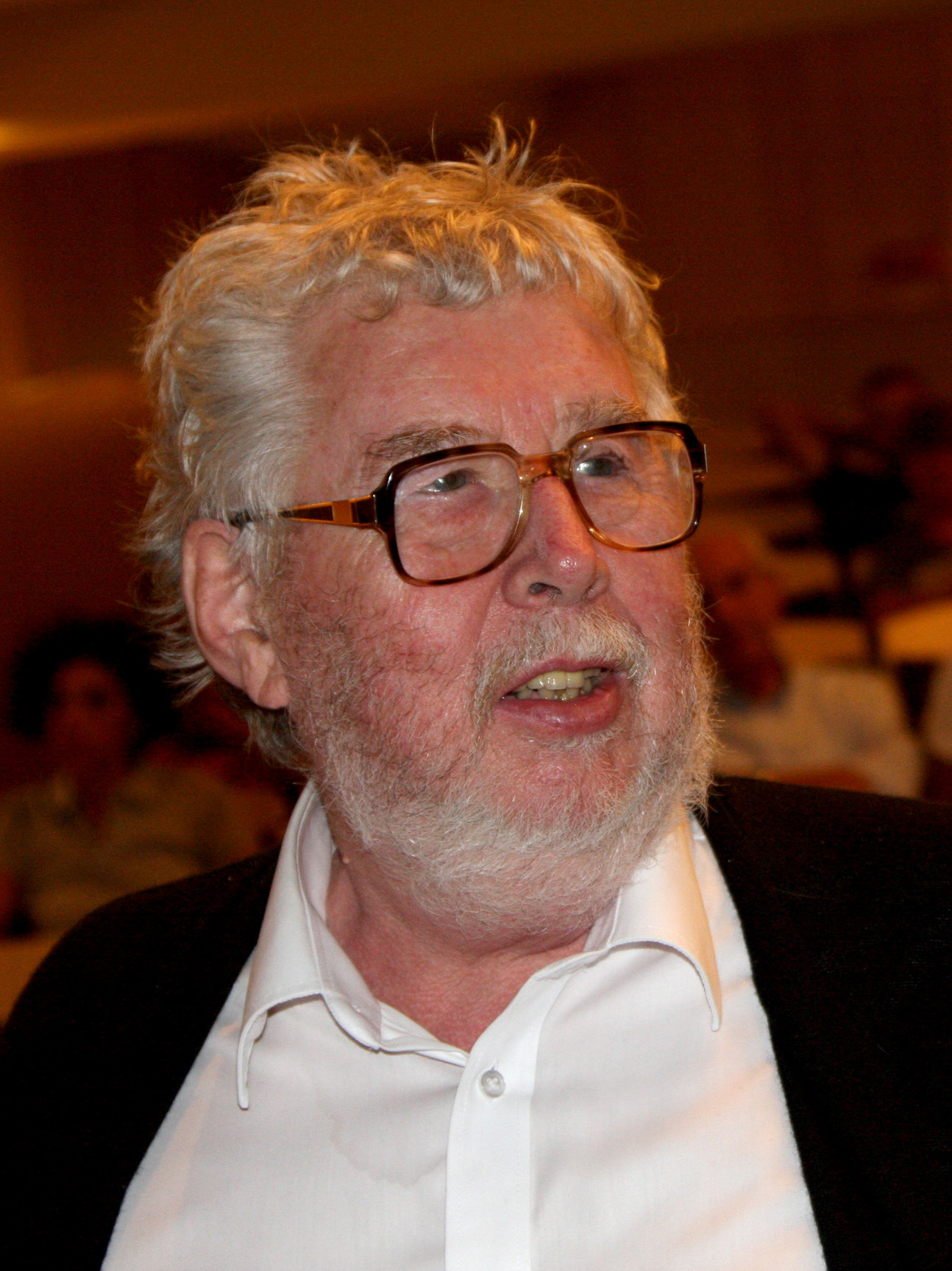
- Birtwistle in 2008
- Librettist: Stephen Pruslin
- Based on: Punch and Judy
- Premiere: 8 June 1968; Aldeburgh Festival

Punch and Judy is a chamber opera with music by Harrison Birtwistle and a libretto by Stephen Pruslin, based on the puppet figures of the same names. Birtwistle wrote the score from 1966 to 1967. The opera was first performed at the Aldeburgh Festival, which had commissioned the work, on 8 June 1968, with David Atherton conducting the English Opera Group. The premiere cast included John Cameron as Mr Punch.

The work caused great controversy with members of the audience, because of the violence of the plot and the nature of the music. Benjamin Britten was reported to have left the premiere at the interval. The first US performance was in Minneapolis, and the first New York performance took place in 1988. The first performance in Austria was in 1991, by Wien Modern, with Birtwistle supervising the production. Birtwistle directed a revival of the opera at Aldeburgh in June 1991.

With reference to the ballet of Igor Stravinsky, Paul Griffiths has characterized Mr Punch as "the exact contrary of Petrushka: a human being behaving as a puppet". David Wright has summarized how Birtwistle and Pruslin attempted to treat the characters and music in an archetypal manner to write what they have described as a "source opera". Jonathan Cross has published a detailed analysis of the opera.

== Roles ==
- Mr Punch – high baritone
- Judy, wife to Punch – mezzo-soprano
- Punch and Judy's baby – (non-singing)
- Pretty Polly – high soprano
- Choregos, friend to Punch – low baritone
- The Lawyer – high tenor
- The Doctor – bass
- Fortune-Teller (sung by the same singer as Judy)
- Witch (sung by the same singer as Pretty Polly)
- Jack Ketch (sung by the same singer as Choregos)
- 5 dancers/mimes – 2 women, 3 men

== Scoring ==
The orchestra consists of:

- On-stage – flute (doubling alto flute, piccolo), oboe (doubling cor anglais), clarinet in B♭ (doubling bass clarinet, clarinet in E♭, optional soprano saxophone), horn and bassoon (doubling contrabassoon).
- In the pit – 2 violins, viola, cello, double bass, trumpet, trombone, harp, percussion (2 players). The string players are also required to play claves, bells, ratchet and wood block.

== Synopsis ==
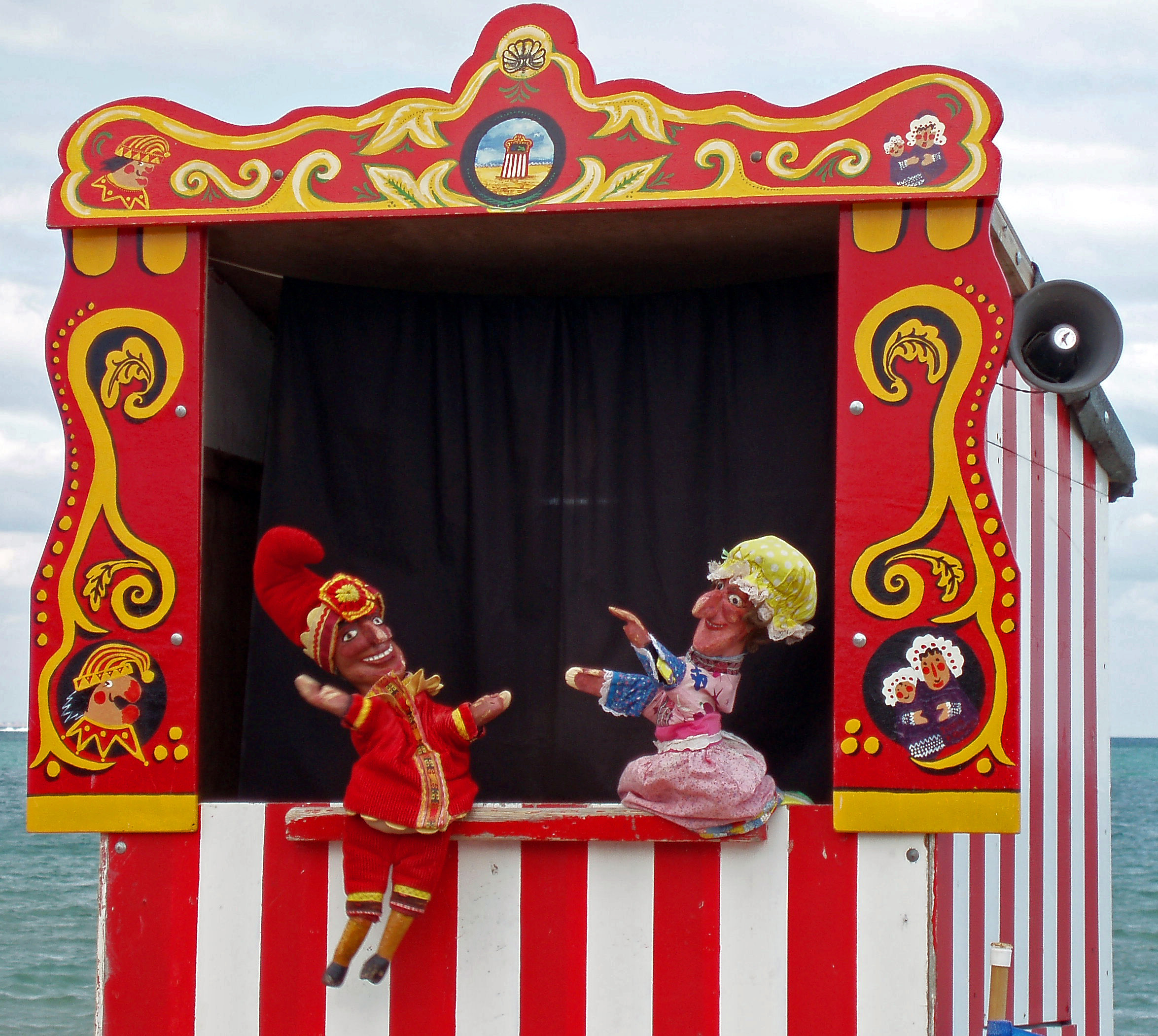
A traditional Punch and Judy booth

Punch is rocking his baby, then throws it into the fire. He stabs Judy to death when she finds the charred baby. Punch is now free to seek Pretty Polly, and he leaves on his horse. He finds her and offers her a flower, which she refuses, saying it was tarnished by his murder of his baby.

The Doctor and Lawyer revive Punch, but they too are murdered (with a gigantic hypodermic needle and quill, respectively), and join Judy at the chorus gibbet. Punch again woos Pretty Polly, giving her a prism. Again she rejects him. Punch murders the Choregos, a narrator figure, by sawing him in half (within a bass viol case). This is a turning point in Punch's life, and the cyclical nature of the work changes.

Punch is haunted by nightmarish images of his cruelty and a satanic wedding with Judy. Punch goes to the gallows for his crimes, but cheats the hangman into hanging himself. Pretty Polly reappears and the two sing a love duet around the gallows, now transformed into a maypole.

== Recording ==
- Decca HEAD 24/25 (LP issue): Stephen Roberts, Phyllis Bryn-Julson, Jan DeGaetani, Philip Langridge, David Wilson-Johnson, John Tomlinson; London Sinfonietta; David Atherton, conductor
