= Saint Nicolas (Britten) =

Cantata composed by Benjamin Britten

- Cantata by Benjamin Britten
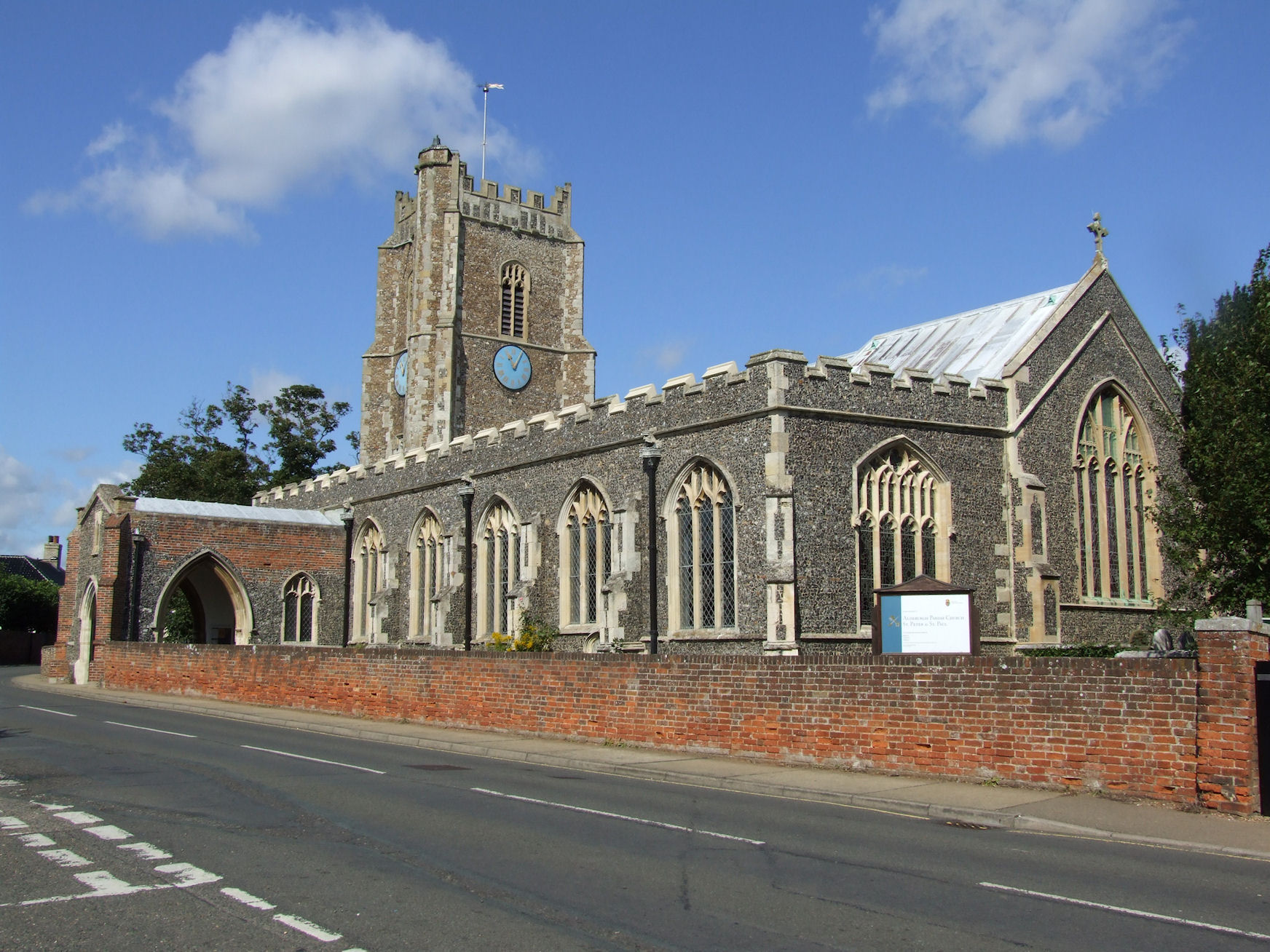
- St Peter and St Paul's Church, Aldeburgh, where the cantata was first performed
- Opus: 42
- Occasion: Opening of first Aldeburgh Festival
- Text: by Eric Crozier
- Based on: Life of Saint Nicholas
- Performed: June 1948
- Scoring: tenor soloist; boys; mixed choir; strings; piano duet; organ; percussion

Saint Nicolas, Op. 42, is a cantata with music by Benjamin Britten on a text by Eric Crozier, completed in 1948. It covers the legendary life of Saint Nicholas, Bishop of Myra, Lycia, in a dramatic sequence of events. The composer wrote the work for the centenary of Lancing College in Sussex, with the resources of the institution in mind. It is scored for mixed choir, tenor soloist, four boy singers, strings, piano duet, organ and percussion. The only professionals required are the tenor soloist, a quintet of string players to lead the other strings, and the first percussionist. Saint Nicolas is Britten's first work for amateur musicians, and it includes congregational hymns. The premiere was the opening concert of the first Aldeburgh Festival in June 1948, with Peter Pears as the soloist.

== History ==
Benjamin Britten wrote the cantata Saint Nicolas, Op. 42, from December 1947 to May 1948 for the centennial celebrations of Lancing College in Sussex. Writing for the resources available, Britten scored the piece for mixed choir, tenor soloist, four boys, strings, piano duet, organ and percussion. The only professional musicians required are the tenor soloist, five string section principals to lead the other strings, and the first percussionist. Saint Nicolas marks Britten's first professional work intended primarily for performance by amateur musicians: it is now frequently performed by youth and amateur ensembles. The duration is given as 50 minutes. While the piece was written for Lancing College, the first performance was actually, with the college's permission, the opening concert of the first Aldeburgh Festival on 5 June 1948, when it was performed in Aldeburgh Church. Britten's dedication reads: "This Cantata was written for performance at the centenary celebrations of Lancing College, Sussex, on 24 July 1948".

The text of Saint Nicolas was written by Eric Crozier after extensive research into the legendary life of Saint Nicholas, Bishop of Myra, Lycia. Crozier's libretto paints a dramatically bold portrait of the saint's character, exaggerating the legends and glory that have accumulated over the centuries around Nicholas's story. Britten's music enhances the drama of Crozier's text using striking contrasts in instrumentation, vocal style, and musical textures.

The Thames Television production, with Ian Partridge singing the title role, won the 1977 Prix Italia.

== Overview ==
=== I. Introduction ===
Saint Nicolas opens with an introduction in which the mixed choir, representing a contemporary people, calls to Nicolas to speak to them across the ages. They sing, "Our eyes are blinded by the holiness you bear", and they wish to hear the true story of Nicolas, the man. After being implored to "Strip off [his] glory", Nicolas responds in a flourish, speaking to the choir, "Across the tremendous bridge of sixteen hundred years…” The first movement ends with a choral prayer.

The choral introduction is centred on the pitch class E, prominent as a pedal tone for much of the first movement. Harmonic tension is achieved by brief chromatic meanderings that return to the central pitch; this technique is effective by providing harmonic and melodic interest while remaining accessible to young and/or amateur singers. Nicolas' response to the chorus departs from the emphasis on E, travelling through many different keys, though generally using diatonic melodies. Nicolas ends his solo on pitch class A, which becomes the new pedal tone for the choral prayer.

=== II. The Birth of Nicolas ===
The second movement begins the depiction of Nicolas' life, recounting the story of his miraculous birth, when “…from his mother's womb he sprang and cried, 'GOD BE GLORIFIED!’” Stories of his childhood continue, punctuated by the refrain "GOD BE GLORIFIED!”, sung by the boy Nicolas (portrayed by the 'youngest boy in the choir', as specified by the composer.) At the end of the movement, the boy becomes a man, and the movement closes with the full-voiced adult tenor singing the refrain.

This movement consists of a tune written in the A-Lydian mode. Britten modulated between A-Lydian and E-Lydian for alternating verses; he did so by altering the Lydian modes into whole-tone-collections, raising the fourth scale degree (as is customary for Lydian) but also raising the fifth scale degree to travel from one mode to the other. The harmonies supporting the modal melodies are tonal and fairly straightforward. At the moment that Nicolas becomes a man, Britten colours the melody's supporting harmonies in a much more dissonant manner, using a semitone clash to darken the simple refrain.

=== III. Nicolas Devotes Himself to God ===
The third movement is sung by Nicolas alone, who recounts how "My parents died … All too soon I left the tranquil beauty of their home … and knew the wider world of men". Nicolas then bemoans his distress over man's faults and devotes himself to a life of service to God.

Britten orchestrated the second movement for just strings and tenors; the texture is much less complicated than the preceding movements. The third movement lacks a tonal center and meanders through significantly more dissonant harmonies; the absence of a catchy, recognisable tune (found in most other movements) makes the third movement come across as a recitative.

=== IV. He Journeys to Palestine ===
The fourth movement of the cantata depicts a sea voyage bringing Nicolas to Palestine. During this voyage, a mighty storm assails the ship, perhaps as punishment to the faithless sailors who have mocked the pious saint. The storm is terrifying, and the sailors despair. Amidst the violent winds, waves, and rain, Nicolas gathers the sailors in prayer, and the storm subsides.

The movement opens with an energetic modal melody centred on F; the melody alternates between the Aeolian, or natural minor mode, and Dorian, with its raised sixth. Britten even raises the fourth occasionally, hinting at Lydian. The interplay between modes in this melody contributes to its lilting character. The tune becomes more dissonant as the storm approaches, and when the storm arrives, the men's song is halted. The female chorus, singing from the galleries, represents the winds and tempests; the girls' voices describe the terrifying storm, pausing only for the sailors' cries for mercy. As the storm subsides, Nicolas emerges; his prayer is musically and textually simple. The movement ends with a return of the initial tune, this time in F major with very slight alteration.

=== V. Nicolas Comes to Myra and is Chosen Bishop ===
In the fifth movement, Nicolas is appointed Bishop of Myra. The chorus calls upon him to "Serve the faith and spurn its enemies". Nicolas vows to do just that, and the movement closes with a congregational hymn.

This movement is the most traditionally tonal of the entire cantata; D major is strongly established in the chorus' homophonic texture. Halfway through the movement, Britten employs a diatonic fugato that concludes in G major. In this key, the congregation joins in the singing of the hymn known as Old Hundredth, which misses out verses 2 and 5 and begins with the words "All people that on earth do dwell" The semichorus sings an upliftingly beautiful descant in Verse 2, rising up to a top B on the word it in "For it is seemly so to do".

=== VI. Nicolas from Prison ===
Like the third movement, the sixth recalls an operatic recitative. Here Nicolas admonishes mankind for accepting its wilderness, calling them to turn to God. While the strings and piano accompaniment are generally centred on a D minor chord, the vocal melody is highly chromatic and dissonant.

=== VII. Nicolas and the Pickled Boys ===
The seventh movement of Saint Nicolas depicts the legend of the Pickled Boys. Nicolas finds himself in an inn where a group of travellers have paused for the night. They invite the bishop to dine with them, but Nicolas stops them from eating, realising that the meat that they eat is in fact the flesh of three boys murdered and pickled by the butcher. Nicolas calls to the boys, "Timothy, Mark, and John, put your fleshly garments on!” and the boys come back to life, singing "Alleluia!"

Like the second and fourth movements, the seventh employs a diatonic mode (here it is B-Aeolian) and a memorable tune sung by the chorus. The female chorus, again singing from the galleries, employ Phrygian and Aeolian modes as they sing the roles of mothers seeking their missing sons. When Nicolas enters the scene, he begins with a melody based on F#-Mixolydian, with occasional chromatic alterations. He ends his call to the dead boys in A major, and the movement concludes with a triumphant repeat of the opening motif in B major.

=== VIII. His Piety and Marvellous Works ===
This movement is a choral song of praise to Nicolas, briefly recounting several different stories of his mercy, charity, and kindness. Most of this movement is written homophonically, with a brief canonic section towards the end. This movement is strongly tonal, in G major.

=== IX. The Death of Nicolas ===
In the final movement of the cantata, Nicolas speaks to his impending death with joy, eagerness, and acceptance. He sings, "Lord, I come to life, to final birth ..." using a highly chromatic melody characteristic of the tenor's solo section. Simultaneously, the chorus chants the Nunc dimittis using the Gregorian "fourth tone" (on which the music of the orchestral introduction is also based). They conclude the chant as Nicolas concludes with the text, "I bless Thy name, who lived and died for me, and dying, dying, dying, dying, yield my soul to Thee." After an energetic instrumental interlude (again based on the plainchant), the cantata closes with a congregational hymn praising God's mysteries and the courage of the saints. The hymn tune of "God Moves in a Mysterious Way" is known as the London New.

== Sources ==
- Bridcut, John. Britten's Children. London: Faber and Faber, 2006.
- Carpenter, Humphrey. Benjamin Britten: A Biography. New York: C. Scribner's Sons, 1992.
- Evans, Peter Angus. The Music of Benjamin Britten. Minneapolis: University of Minnesota Press, 1979.
- Hansler, George. "Stylistic characteristics and trends in the choral music of five twentieth-century British composers", Dissertation (Ph.D.) – New York University, 1957.
- Hart, Ralph Eugene. "Compositional Techniques in Choral Works of Stravinsky, Hindemith, Honegger, and Britten", Dissertation (Ph.D.) – Northwestern University, 1952.
- Holst, Imogen. "Britten’s Saint Nicolas", Tempo, no.10 (1948), 23–5.
- Mitchell, Donald, and Hans Keller, editors. Benjamin Britten: A Commentary on His Works from a Group of Specialists. New York: Philosophical Library, 1953.
