= Chamber opera =

Opera genre

Chamber opera is a designation for operas written to be performed with a chamber ensemble rather than a full orchestra. Early 20th-century operas of this type include Gustav Holst's Savitri (1916) and Paul Hindemith's Cardillac (1926). Earlier small-scale operas such as Pergolesi's La serva padrona (1733) are sometimes known as chamber operas.

Benjamin Britten wrote works in this category in the 1940s when the English Opera Group needed works that could easily be taken on tour and performed in a variety of small performance spaces. The Rape of Lucretia (1946) was his first example in the genre, and Britten followed it with Albert Herring (1947), The Turn of the Screw (1954) and Curlew River (1964). Other composers, including Hans Werner Henze, Harrison Birtwistle, Thomas Adès, George Benjamin, William Walton, and Philip Glass have written in this genre.

Instrumentation for chamber operas vary: Britten scored The Rape of Lucretia for eight singers with single strings and wind with piano, harp and percussion. Humphrey Searle's The Diary of a Madman (1958) is scored for four voices and an orchestra of single strings, woodwind and brass, with two percussionists. An electronic tape is also specified to produce particular sound effects. Judith Weir's King Harald's Saga (1979) is for a single soprano voice.

== See also ==
- Chamber Made Opera, Australian production house
