= Joan Cross =

British opera singer

Joan Cross as Queen Elizabeth I in Britten's Gloriana

Joan Annie Cross (7 September 1900 – 12 December 1993) was an English soprano, closely associated with the operas of Benjamin Britten, who wrote five roles with her in mind. She also sang in the Italian and German operatic repertoires, and later became a musical administrator, taking on the direction of the Sadler's Wells Opera Company and acting as principal of the Opera Studio in London (later called the London Opera Centre). Her repertoire was unusually wide, ranging from lyric to dramatic soprano roles, from Mozart to Wagner. Most of her singing career was with Sadler's Wells Opera, the forerunner of the English National Opera but she appeared at the Royal Opera House from time to time.

== Life and career ==
Joan Cross was born in London on 7 September 1900 and was adopted by an aunt and uncle. She was educated from 1913 at St Paul's Girls' School, where Gustav Holst was among her music teachers, and, from 1923, Trinity College of Music, where, after studying the violin with Émile Sauret, she was taught singing by Dawson Freer. While still a student she sang as a soloist in recitals and oratorio.

In 1923 Cross joined the chorus of the Old Vic opera company at its theatre in south London. She was not much taken with opera as a genre, and in its early days the Old Vic operated on an exceptionally tight budget, costumes and scenery were shabby and there was little systematic stage direction or rehearsal. As Cross had no stage experience, Lilian Baylis, who ran both the Old Vic drama company and the opera company, offered her a position – unpaid at first – in the opera chorus. Cross gained promotion to secondary principal roles within a year. They included Alisa in Lucia di Lammermoor, Elisabeth in Tannhäuser, Frasquita in Carmen, Lola in Cavalleria Rusticana, Mercedes in Carmen, Second Lady in The Magic Flute and Venus in Tannhäuser. When the company performed The Marriage of Figaro in Oxford, the reviewer in The Oxford Chronicle wrote, "As Cherubino Miss Joan Cross was enchanting, and her "Has Cupid Found Me?" ["Voi che sapete"] remained the most delightful thing of the whole delightful evening". Gradually Cross rose to the central operatic roles: the title role in Aida was followed by Elsa in Lohengrin (1928), learned in ten days as a last-minute replacement. Cross had a short-lived marriage (date uncertain) to a James Armstrong, but she seldom referred to it; they had no children.

=== Leading roles ===
By the end of the 1920s Cross had added to her repertory as a leading lyric soprano: Desdemona in Otello, Donna Elvira in Don Giovanni, Marguerite in Faust , Micaëla in Carmen, Mimi in La bohème, Pamina in The Magic Flute, Tatyana in Eugene Onegin and, after studying the role for a year, Violetta in La traviata.

Baylis acquired a second theatre, Sadler's Wells, which opened in 1930. At first she presented both drama and opera at each of her theatres. The companies were known as the "Vic-Wells". By 1934 the Old Vic had become the home of the spoken drama, while Sadler's Wells housed both the opera and a ballet company, the latter co-founded by Baylis and Ninette de Valois in 1930.

At Sadler's Wells, Cross's career flourished. She took on roles such as Leonora in La forza del destino, Donna Anna in Don Giovanni, Brünnhilde in Die Walküre and Cio-Cio-San in Madame Butterfly; according to the critic Frank Granville Barker, "she was equally persuasive as Mimi in La bohème at one end of the scale and Sieglinde in Die Walküre at the other". In Grove's Dictionary of Music and Musicians, Bryan Crimp describes Cross as "a consummate singing-actress in an exceptionally wide range of roles, from Purcell's Dido to Rosalinde (Die Fledermaus)".

Cross performed mainly for the Sadler's Wells opera company but made a few appearances at the Royal Opera House, Covent Garden during the 1930s: Mimi, Elsa, Micaëla (with Conchita Supervía as Carmen), and a single Desdemona (to Lauritz Melchior's Otello) in 1934, the latter two conducted by Sir Thomas Beecham. According to Granville Barker, Cross reached a peak in her career in 1939 as the Marschallin in Der Rosenkavalier, "a role in which she made regrettably few appearances owing to the outbreak of war".

=== Second World War ===
Sadler's Wells managed to complete an opera season in 1940 but the theatre was badly damaged by German bombs in May 1941 and the local council requisitioned it to provide a refuge for people made homeless by air-raids. Lilian Baylis had died in 1937 and the three Old Vic and Sadler's Wells companies were under the direction of Tyrone Guthrie. With no London base the opera company, with greatly reduced forces, toured the country. Guthrie appointed Cross to lead the company. Her contract stipulated that her new role was to be purely administrative, but in practice it was often necessary for her to sing in emergencies or to take small parts for which the small troupe had no available performers.

The company presented London seasons at the New Theatre and for the next four years it appeared in theatres all over the country (in sixty-nine different towns) often in places where opera had never been professionally staged before. By 1943 the company had grown sufficiently to undertake a successful revival of The Bartered Bride, followed by Così fan tutte with Cross as Fiordiligi, Owen Brannigan as Don Alfonso and Peter Pears as Ferrando. In a biographical sketch, Lord Harewood writes that Cross's management was skilled enough to ensure that the company emerged from the war years financially sound – "something of a triumph for a manager singing roles in Dido and Aeneas and The Beggar's Opera, as well as giving regular performances of Butterfly, Violetta, the Countess and Mimi".

Sadler's Wells Theatre reopened on 7 June 1945 with the premiere of Benjamin Britten's Peter Grimes. The composer had seen the company's production of La traviata and was impressed enough to offer Cross the chance to present the first production of his new opera. He had written the title role with his life partner, Pears, in mind and was adamant that Cross should play the female lead, Ellen Orford. When she announced the plan to reopen the house with Peter Grimes there were acrimonious complaints from some company members about supposed favouritism and the "cacophony" of Britten's score. Yet when Peter Grimes opened, it was hailed by public and critics; its box-office takings matched or exceeded those for La bohème and Madame Butterfly, which were being staged concurrently by the company.

=== Post-war ===
The internal acrimony within the company led to the departure of Cross, Pears, Reginald Goodall (who conducted the new opera) and Eric Crozier (who directed it). At first they allied themselves with the Glyndebourne Festival Opera, where Britten's next two operas were premiered: The Rape of Lucretia (1946) and Albert Herring (1947), Cross sang the Female Chorus in the first and Lady Billows in the second; Harewood describes the former as "a compassionate commentator on the brutal events of the story", the latter as "a comic representation of one side of her own character, a grande dame of considerable splendour and panache".

In 1947 Cross turned to directing, taking charge of a new production of Der Rosenkavalier at Covent Garden. Following the company's policy at the time an English translation of the text was used. Cross was not invited to sing the Marschallin in her production, but was onstage at Covent Garden in 1953 singing Elizabeth I in Britten's Gloriana. Harewood comments that Cross met all the demands of the role from Elizabeth's imperious appearance in public to her vulnerable private self and her humility praying to God for guidance. The Times commented that though the work divided opinions, "about the majesty and insight of Cross's own performance there has been little debate". Her final new role in a Britten opera was Mrs Grose in The Turn of the Screw at La Fenice in Venice in 1954. She retired from singing the following year.

Cross continued to work in opera, but after 1955 as director rather than singer. She worked more often abroad – in the Netherlands, Scandinavia, and Canada – than in Britain, and she served as principal of the Opera Studio (later called the National School of Opera, and then London Opera Centre), which together with the singer Anne Wood she had founded in 1948. Both Cross and Wood resigned in 1964 after a dispute with the board. Harewood speculates that this may explain why Cross did not receive the damehood that much of the operatic world believed she deserved.

Cross retired to Aldeburgh in Suffolk, where her friends Britten and Pears lived. She remained a familiar figure at the Aldeburgh Festival into her old age. According to her obituarist in The Times, "In her mid-eighties she was still a sprightly figure, living in a cottage packed with operatic memorabilia and leading visitors up the lane to lunch at the local pub, where she held forth about musical rights and wrongs". She died on 12 December 1993, and is buried in Saint Peter and Saint Paul's churchyard, Aldeburgh, where Britten, Pears and Imogen Holst are also interred.

== Recordings ==
Cross was not a prolific recording artist, but a few commercial studio sets were made and several non-studio recordings have been issued on LP and CD:

- A complete Albert Herring recorded live in Copenhagen in 1949, with the composer conducting.
- A complete The Turn of the Screw, conducted by Britten, recorded by Decca in 1955.
- An abridged set of Iolanthe as Celia.
- An abridged set of The Gondoliers, as Gianetta.
- An abridged set of The Mikado as Pitti-Sing.
- An abridged The Rape of Lucretia.
- Ach ich fühls from The Magic Flute.
- Dove Sono from The Marriage of Figaro.
- An aria from Così fan tutte – in English "Ah my love".
- The Ave Maria and Willow Song from Otello.
- They call me Mimi from La bohème.

== Sources ==
- Banks, Paul (2000). The Making of Peter Grimes: Essays and Studies. Woodbridge: Boydell Press. ISBN 0-85115-791-2.
- Gilbert, Susie (2009). Opera for Everybody: The Story of English National Opera. London: Faber and Faber. ISBN 978-0-571-22493-7.
- Grogan, Christopher; Rosamund Strode, eds. (2010). Imogen Holst: A Life in Music (revised ed.). Woodbridge, Suffolk: The Boydell Press. ISBN 978-1-84383-599-8.
- Rosenthal, Harold (1956). Sopranos for Today. London: John Calder. OCLC 1299187.
