= Johanna Peters =

Scottish mezzo-soprano

- Born: 3 January 1932; Glasgow, Scotland
- Died: 27 May 2000 (aged 68)
- Occupation: Voice teacher
- Partner: Anne Wood (d. 1998)

Johanna Peters (3 January 1932 – 27 May 2000) was a Scottish mezzo-soprano who played a prominent role in British operatic life during her 40-year career, first as singer, and later as a distinguished voice teacher at the Guildhall School of Music. As a singer, she was particularly known for her intelligent portrayal of a wide variety of character parts and created the roles of Hippolyta in Benjamin Britten's A Midsummer Night's Dream and The Widow Sweeney in Nicholas Maw's The Rising of the Moon. For many years she and her companion, Anne Wood, ran their own small touring company, Phoenix Opera.
