= Aldeburgh Festival =

Arts festival in England

Coordinates: 52°09′50″N 1°29′51″E

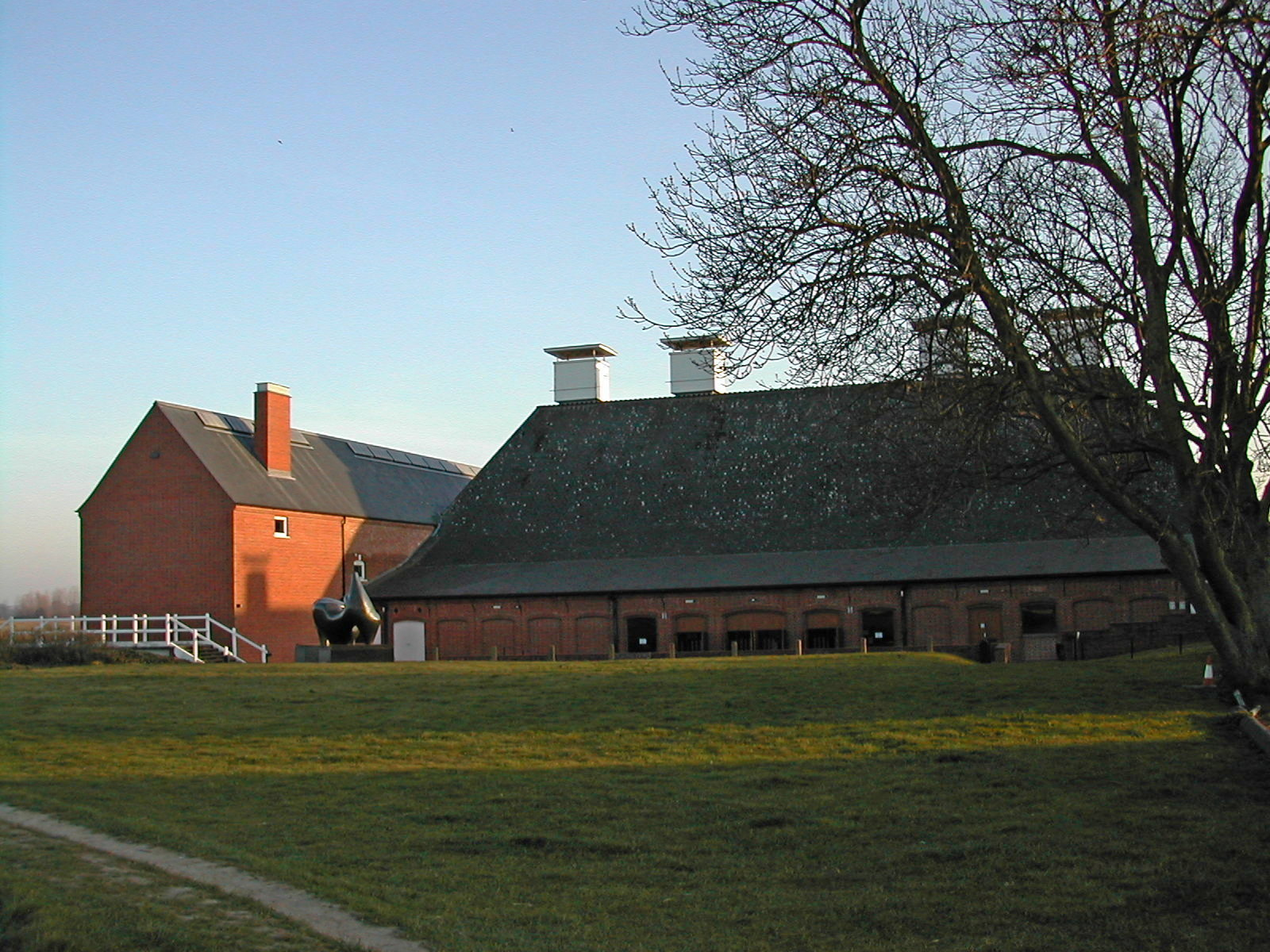
Snape Maltings concert hall

The Aldeburgh Festival of Music and the Arts is an English arts festival devoted mainly to classical music. It takes place each June in the town of Aldeburgh, Suffolk and is centred on Snape Maltings Concert Hall.

== History of the Aldeburgh Festival ==
The Festival was founded in 1948 by the composer Benjamin Britten, the singer Peter Pears and the librettist/producer Eric Crozier. Their work with the English Opera Group (which they had founded with designer John Piper in 1947) frequently took them away from home, and it was while they were on tour in Switzerland with Albert Herring and The Rape of Lucretia in August of that year, that Peter Pears said "Why not make our own Festival? A modest Festival with a few concerts given by friends? Why not have an Aldeburgh Festival?" The English Opera Group would provide a core programme of opera productions, but the vision was soon widened to include readings of poetry, literature, drama, lectures and exhibitions of art. The first festival was held from 5–13 June 1948 and used the Aldeburgh Jubilee Hall, a few doors away from Britten's house in Crabbe Street, as its main venue, with performances in other venues such as Aldeburgh's fifteenth-century Church of Saint Peter and Saint Paul. It featured a performance of Albert Herring by the English Opera Group; Britten's newly written Saint Nicolas; and performances by Clifford Curzon and the Zorian String Quartet.

Over the years the festival grew and took in additional venues in nearby Orford, Blythburgh and Framlingham. However, the lack of a large venue was holding back the further development of the festival until one of the largest mid-nineteenth century maltings in East Anglia, at Snape, a village just outside Aldeburgh, became available. Britten, who had lived in Snape in the 1930s, had the vision that the largest of the malthouses could be converted into a Concert Hall. Most of the building's original character, such as the distinctive square malthouse roof-vents, was retained. The new concert hall was opened by the Queen on 2 June 1967, at the start of the twentieth Aldeburgh Festival.

Two years later, on the first night of the 1969 Festival, the concert hall was destroyed by fire. Only the shell of the outer walls remained. For that year the Festival was moved to other local venues and only one performance was lost. By the following year the hall had been rebuilt and once again it was opened in the presence of the Queen, this time at the start of the 1970 Festival. The new Concert Hall at Snape Maltings became the main focus for the Aldeburgh Festival, although performances continued to be held at all the former venues.

For the first six years of the Aldeburgh Festival, the joint artistic directors remained Britten, Pears and Crozier; in 1955, Britten and Pears were in sole charge, then the following year they were joined by Imogen Holst, who remained a member of the Artistic Directorate until her death in 1984. After Britten's own death in 1976, the artistic direction of the festival was shared; musicians who joined the artistic team included Philip Ledger, Colin Graham, Steuart Bedford, Mstislav Rostropovich, Murray Perahia, Simon Rattle, John Shirley-Quirk and Oliver Knussen.

From the beginning, the Festivals were characterised by an eclectic range of music, from the classics – Bach, Haydn, Mozart – to contemporary work, with young composers in particular being commissioned. By 1982, Britten–Pears archivist Rosamund Strode calculated that the Festival had to that date presented new works by over 75 composers, with world premieres of fifteen operas. Concert goers were over the ensuing years to see new works not only by Britten himself, but by composers such as Lennox Berkeley, Richard Rodney Bennett, Elliott Carter, Hans Werner Henze, Alfred Schnittke, Toru Takemitsu, Michael Tippett, Mark-Anthony Turnage and Malcolm Williamson, many of whom came to the Festival as composer-in-residence.

Imogen Holst introduced early choral music, and soon works by European composers rarely heard at that time in England were in the repertoire, such as Berg, Mahler, Schoenberg, Poulenc, Boulez, and Webern. Later, Copland, Dutilleux, Lutoslawski and Kodály were to come to the Festival. In contrast, John Dankworth and Cleo Laine, Joyce Grenfell, Peggy Ashcroft and actors from the Royal Shakespeare Company made regular appearances; Princess Grace of Monaco came to take part in a poetry recital. Sviatoslav Richter played for Queen Elizabeth the Queen Mother.

The size and capacity of the Concert Hall enabled the Festival to present full-scale orchestras for the first time, and for many years Simon Rattle brought his City of Birmingham Symphony Orchestra to Snape. There was a strong connection with Russian music: Rostropovich and Richter became frequent visitors, and in 1970 Shostakovich's 14th Symphony, dedicated to Britten, had its first performance outside the USSR at the Concert Hall.

Peter Pears, in addition to his role as joint artistic director, was a regular performer, often accompanied by Britten, and often appearing in up to ten concerts during the Festival. Janet Baker, Julian Bream, Osian Ellis, Dietrich Fischer-Dieskau, John Shirley-Quirk and Robert Tear were among the regular performers in the early days, followed later by Alfred Brendel, Ian Bostridge, Thomas Allen, Philip Langridge and Ann Murray.

The Concert Hall proved very capable of being turned into an opera stage. The Royal Opera presented A Midsummer Night's Dream in the first season, and on 16 June 1973, the first performance of Britten's final opera, Death in Venice, was given at the Concert Hall, with Pears in the role of Aschenbach. In 1976, in what was to be Britten's last Festival, Janet Baker sang the premiere of his dramatic cantata Phaedra in a festival that included performances by André Previn, Elisabeth Söderström, Sviatoslav Richter and the entire Rostropovich family.

In 1979, Rostropovich conducted the Britten–Pears School in a performance of Eugene Onegin (with Pears as guest in the role of M. Triquet, and Eric Crozier as the valet Guillot). In subsequent years, the school regularly performed an opera during the festival.

The 2020 festival was cancelled due to the COVID-19 pandemic and a virtual one was held in its place.

== The festival today ==
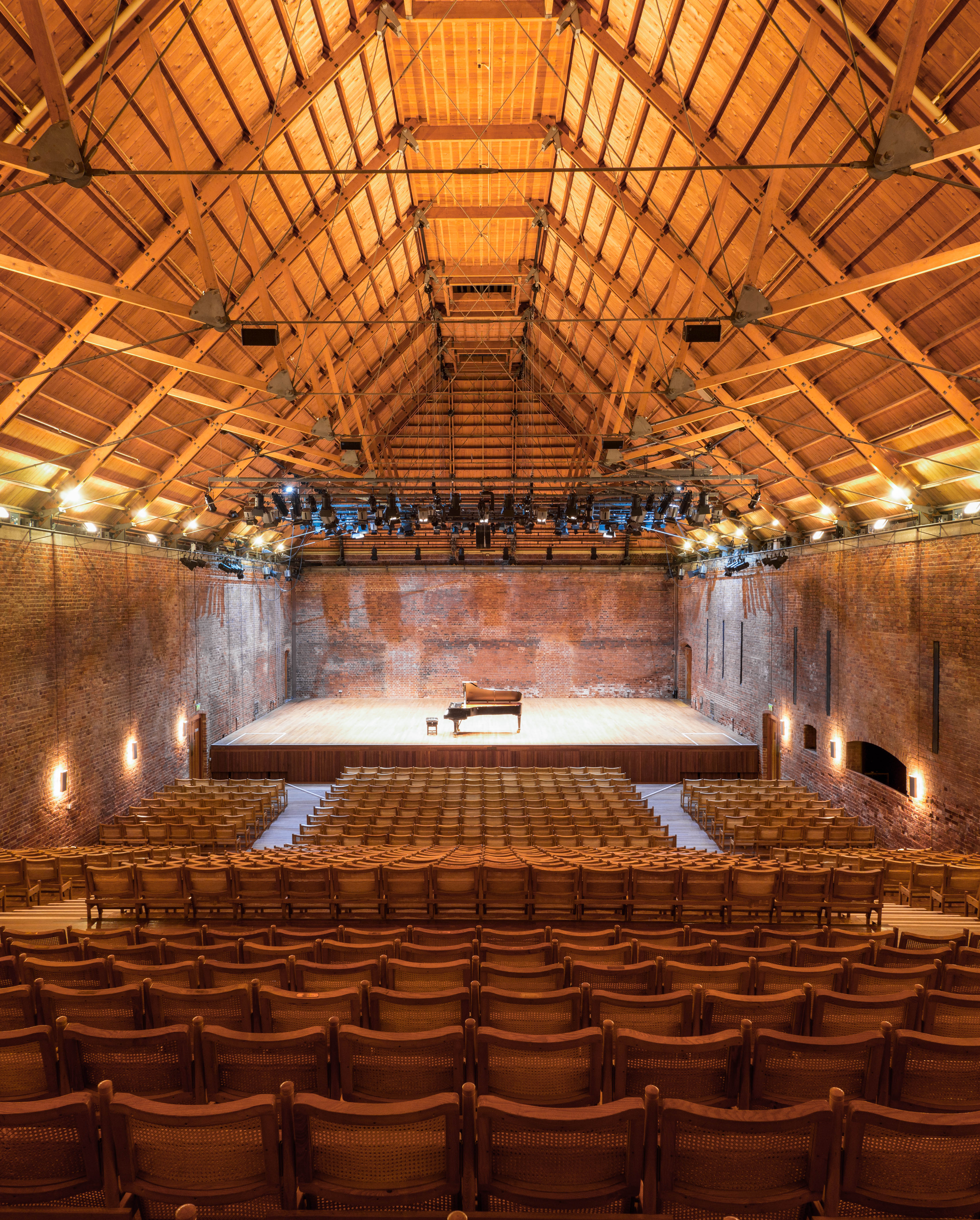
The interior of the Concert Hall

The organisation responsible for running the Aldeburgh Festival changed its name to Aldeburgh Music in 2006.

Thomas Adès was succeeded as artistic director of the festival by Pierre-Laurent Aimard (2009–16). In 2009, a suite of new spaces at Snape Maltings, including the Hoffmann Building's Britten Studio and the Jerwood Kiln Studio, was opened with the premiere performance of Harrison Birtwistle's opera The Corridor.

The 2012 Festival had Oliver Knussen as Artist in Residence, and the typically eclectic programme included new productions of Knussen's Where the Wild Things Are and Higglety Pigglety Pop!, a concert series exploring the work of Helmut Lachenmann, recitals by Menahem Pressler, Ian Bostridge, Peter Serkin, Miklós Perényi, Dezső Ránki and the Arditti and Keller Quartets, the City of Birmingham Symphony Orchestra with the UK premiere of a work by Elliott Carter, as well as dramatised performances with film at the Leiston Long Shop Museum, the complete screening with live accompaniment of Britten's 1930s film scores, a promenade performance of John Cage's Song Books in the Hoffmann Building under the banner of #Faster than Sound, and open-air community events on Aldeburgh Beach.

The centenary of Britten's birth was held between November 2012 and November 2013, and the 2013 Festival, the 66th, featured a new production by Tim Albery of Britten's opera, Peter Grimes, the complete church parables in Orford Church, and new works by Harrison Birtwistle, Wolfgang Rihm, Judith Weir, Magnus Lindberg and Richard Rodney Bennett.

The Aldeburgh Festival retains a unique character, largely due to its location in rural Suffolk. It also continues to emphasise the presentation of new music, new interpretations and the rediscovery of forgotten music. It has seen the premieres of several works by Britten (A Midsummer Night's Dream in 1960; Death in Venice in 1973) and also Harrison Birtwistle's Punch and Judy in 1968, The Io Passion in 2004, The Corridor in 2009 and The Cure in 2015.

The Aldeburgh Festival has always included the visual arts as well as music, and a number of exhibitions are curated each year to accompany the music programme. The main sites for exhibitions are various venues within the Snape Maltings complex and The Red House in Aldeburgh.
