= Owen Brannigan =

British opera singer (1908–1973)

Branningan circa 1960

Owen Brannigan OBE (10 March 1908 – 9 May 1973) was an English bass, known in opera for buffo roles and in concert for a wide range of solo parts in music ranging from Henry Purcell to Michael Tippett. He is best remembered for his roles in Mozart and Britten operas and for his recordings of roles in Britten, Offenbach and Gilbert and Sullivan operas, as well as recordings of English folk songs.

Brannigan began as an amateur singer and attended music college part-time, while working as a joiner, until his quality was recognised and he was awarded a scholarship during World War II. Although he had an international opera career, he performed most frequently with English opera companies, particularly Sadler's Wells opera, and later at Glyndebourne and Covent Garden. Highlights of his broad repertory included creating three roles in Benjamin Britten's early operas, and two more in later Britten operas that were written specifically for him. On record and in concert at the Proms he was a popular interpreter of the bass-baritone roles in Gilbert and Sullivan operas. Brannigan's oratorio and concert repertory was extensive, covering works from many periods.

== Biography ==
=== Early years ===
Brannigan was born in Annitsford, Northumberland, near Newcastle, the son of the local church organist (of Irish descent), in whose choir he sang as a boy. In 1929, he moved south to look for work. He worked as a joiner in Slough, and in his spare time he appeared with the Windsor Operatic Society. In 1934 he enrolled as a night student at the Guildhall School of Music while working days as a government clerk, and in 1938 was appointed as a bass singer at Westminster Cathedral. After a Guildhall performance of Ruddigore, by Gilbert and Sullivan, in which he played a member of the chorus of ghosts depicted in a picture gallery, he was singled out by Sir Landon Ronald: "I want to hear the third portrait from the left", and was offered a scholarship to continue his studies full-time. He later earned positive reviews for his performance in a student production of La Vie parisienne, by Jacques Offenbach, in 1939. He won the Guildhall's Gold Medal in 1942.

=== Opera career ===
During part of World War II, Brannigan was in charge of construction work building army camps, but he was able to make some broadcasts on BBC radio. In 1939 he participated in a BBC studio production of Ralph Vaughan Williams's Hugh the Drover. Joan Cross heard him broadcast and invited him to join the Sadler's Wells Opera, with whom he made his professional operatic début in 1943, at age 35, as Sarastro in Mozart's The Magic Flute. He was with Sadler's Wells from 1944 to 1949 and from 1952 to 1958. There, he created the role of Swallow in Benjamin Britten's Peter Grimes (1945). He performed at Glyndebourne Festival Opera from 1947, and at Covent Garden in 1947, 1948 and 1958.

At Glyndebourne, in other Britten premières, he created the roles of Collatinus in The Rape of Lucretia (1946), and Superintendent Budd in Albert Herring (1948). Later, Britten wrote the parts of Noye in Noye's Fludde (1958), and Bottom in A Midsummer Night's Dream (1960), with Brannigan in mind. Brannigan's repertoire ranged from the earliest operas, including La Calisto by Francesco Cavalli and The Fairy-Queen by Henry Purcell, to modern operas, not only by Britten but other composers including Malcolm Williamson (English Eccentrics, 1964 and The Violins of Saint-Jacques, 1966).

Brannigan was known for his roles in comic operas. Of his performance in Don Pasquale at Sadler's Wells, The Times reported, "Brannigan dodders deliciously in the title role, an irresistible noodle with a ludicrous ripeness in his tones and a vivid appreciation of the humour." He was also admired for his Osmin in Mozart's Die Entführung aus dem Serail, in which he displayed both his buffo and his dramatic skills. He appeared in the 1953 film The Story of Gilbert and Sullivan, and in several Gilbert and Sullivan concerts at the Proms. Of the first of these, in 1955, The Times wrote, "So far as comedy was concerned, Mr Owen Brannigan won hands down in his magnificently done Sentry's Song (from Iolanthe)."

=== Concert career ===
The Times considered Brannigan to be "perhaps even better known as an oratorio than as an opera singer." In concert, his repertoire ranged from Purcell to Bach's B minor Mass and Tippett's A Child of Our Time. It included works outside the general repertory such as Kodály's Te Deum and Elgar's The Apostles. At the Three Choirs Festival, he sang in Verdi's Requiem and Elgar's The Dream of Gerontius, in which he was praised for his "forthright nobility". This aspect of his singing was not without its critics: Edward Sackville-West called it "monotonously hearty", while his colleague Andrew Porter thought it "fine and forthright."

Among the other choral works in which Brannigan sang the bass solo parts were Haydn's Creation and Handel's Messiah and Acis and Galatea. In addition to the classics, he also gained popularity in radio and television programmes of Northumbrian and other folksongs and art songs, especially by English composers such as Thomas Morley, Charles Edward Horn and Arthur Sullivan.

Together with Sir William Walton, Brannigan took part in a celebrated prank at the Royal Festival Hall in 1961, at a concert celebrating the musical humorist Gerard Hoffnung, who had died in 1959. The management announced that Walton had agreed at short notice to conduct an excerpt from his cantata Belshazzar's Feast. Walton and Brannigan entered, and bowed. Walton raised his baton, and the chorus bellowed the single word "slain" from the score. Walton then put down his baton, shook hands with Brannigan, who had not sung a note, and they both bowed and left the platform to gales of applause.

=== Recordings ===
Brannigan recorded all his major Britten roles under the baton of the composer. Of these, some critics regard his Noye as his most notable legacy; others find his Nick Bottom to be incomparable. He recorded Purcell's The Fairy Queen in 1970 for Decca, also under Britten's baton. For Sir Thomas Beecham, he recorded Offenbach's The Tales of Hoffmann in 1947, a recording which formed the soundtrack for a 1951 film of the opera. For Sir Adrian Boult he recorded the bass solo part in Messiah and the role of Polyphemus in Acis and Galatea.

For Sir Malcolm Sargent, he recorded the following Gilbert and Sullivan roles: the title role in The Mikado (1957), Don Alhambra in The Gondoliers (1957), Wilfred Shadbolt in The Yeomen of the Guard (1958), Dick Deadeye in H.M.S. Pinafore (1958), Private Willis in Iolanthe (1959), the Sergeant of Police in The Pirates of Penzance (1961), the Usher in Trial by Jury (1961) and Sir Despard in Ruddigore (1963). He also sang Willis in the BBC recording of Iolanthe in 1966. His interpretation of the Sergeant of Police in The Pirates of Penzance was so admired that he was invited to make a second recording of it, for the D'Oyly Carte Opera Company, in 1968. The Penguin Guide to Opera said, "perhaps the greatest joy of this recording is Owen Brannigan's Sergeant of Police, a part this artist was surely born to play ... it is almost like hearing it for the first time."

Many of Brannigan's favourite North Country songs were recorded on disc; he also made light music comedy recordings such as A Little Nonsense (nursery rhymes sung in humorously operatic style) with the Pro Arte Orchestra conducted by Sir Charles Mackerras, which was recorded in 1962.

=== Later years and legacy ===
In 1964, Queen Elizabeth II named Brannigan an Officer of the Order of the British Empire.

Brannigan was in a serious car crash in 1972, from which he never fully recovered. He died of pneumonia in 1973, aged 65, and is buried in the churchyard of St John the Baptist Roman Catholic Church at Annitsford. Brannigan married Mary née Ashley. Their daughter Maureen died in childhood from diphtheria, and their son, also called Owen, died in 1981 (aged 40) after being electrocuted in an accident.

The opera singer Graeme Danby presented a series of tributes to Brannigan on television and in concert in 2008 to celebrate the 100th anniversary of Brannigan's birth. His tribute, including recordings of Brannigan, as well as singing by Danby and interviews of people who knew Brannigan, was published as a DVD documentary.
