= The Rape of Lucretia =

1946 opera by Benjamin Britten

- Chamber opera by Benjamin Britten
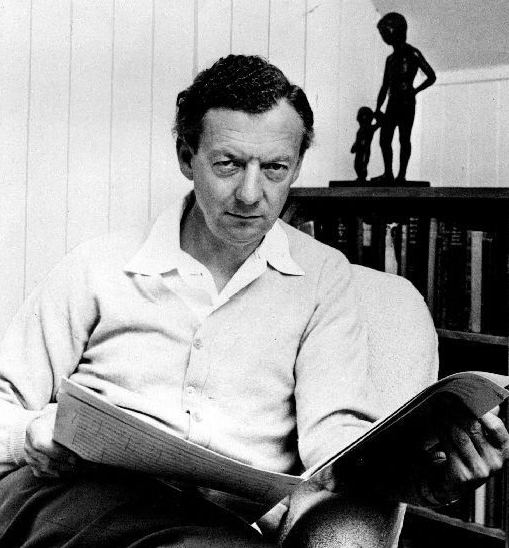
- The composer in 1968
- Librettist: Ronald Duncan
- Language: English
- Based on: Le Viol de Lucrèce by André Obey
- Premiere: 12 July 1946; Glyndebourne Festival Opera

The Rape of Lucretia (Op. 37) is an opera in two acts by Benjamin Britten, written for Kathleen Ferrier, who performed the title role. Ronald Duncan based his English libretto on André Obey's play Le Viol de Lucrèce.

== Performance history ==
The opera was first performed at Glyndebourne in England on 12 July 1946. It is the first work to which Britten applied his term "chamber opera." The opera debuted in the United States on Broadway at the Ziegfeld Theatre in a production staged by Agnes de Mille which opened on 29 December 1948 and closed on 15 January 1949 after 23 performances. The cast notably included Giorgio Tozzi as Tarquinius, Kitty Carlisle as Lucretia, Lidija Franklin as Bianca, Brenda Lewis as the Female Chorus, and Adelaide Bishop as Lucia.

In 1996 the opera was presented at the Opera Theatre of St. Louis directed by Britten expert and friend, Colin Graham. It also appeared in the Opera Company of Philadelphia's 2009 season. In 2013, the opera was performed for the first time by Glyndebourne since its premiere, directed by actress Fiona Shaw. This production opened on tour to great acclaim. Shaw's production premiered at Glyndebourne's festival in 2015 to similar acclaim.

In a 2026 "survivor-centric" production by University of Toronto Opera in Toronto, Lucretia did not kill herself. Director Anna Theodosakis said the reference in the libretto to "her body [being] borne through our city" could be interpreted instead to refer, in contemporary terms, to "someone's personal trauma [being] circulated endlessly by the media."

== Roles ==
| Role | Voice type | Premiere Cast, 12 July 1946 (Conductor: Ernest Ansermet) |
|---|---|---|
| Male Chorus | tenor | Peter Pears |
| Female Chorus | soprano | Joan Cross |
| Collatinus, a Roman general | bass | Owen Brannigan |
| Junius, a Roman general | baritone | Edmund Donleavy |
| Tarquinius, prince of Rome | baritone | Otakar Kraus |
| Lucretia, wife of Collatinus | contralto | Kathleen Ferrier |
| Bianca, Lucretia's old nurse | mezzo-soprano | Anna Pollak |
| Lucia, a maid | soprano | Margaret Ritchie |

== Synopsis ==
=== Prologue ===
The Male and Female Choruses explain the situation in Rome: ruled by the foreigner Tarquinius Superbus and fighting off a Greek invasion, the city has sunk into depravity. The two choruses describe their own role as Christian interpreters of the pagan story about to begin. Throughout the opera the Male Chorus will narrate the thoughts of the male characters, and the Female Chorus those of the female characters.

=== Act 1 ===
In an armed camp outside Rome, Tarquinius, Collatinus and Junius are drinking together. The previous night, a group of soldiers rode home unexpectedly to Rome to check on their wives, all of whom were caught betraying their husbands, with the single exception of Collatinus' wife Lucretia. Junius, whose wife was among the faithless majority, goads young Tarquinius, the king's son, into testing Lucretia's chastity himself. The impulsive prince calls for his horse and gallops off to the city alone.

At Collatinus' house in Rome, Lucretia is patiently spinning with her servants Bianca and Lucia. She longs for her absent husband. As the women prepare for bed, there is a knock at the door: Tarquinius. Though fearful, they cannot refuse to offer the prince hospitality.

=== Act 2 ===
As Lucretia sleeps, Tarquinius creeps into her bedroom and awakens her with a kiss. She begs him to go, but certain that she desires him, he rapes her.

The following morning, Lucia and Bianca are glad to discover that Tarquinius has already left the house. Lucretia enters, calm but obviously devastated. She sends a messenger asking Collatinus to come home. Bianca tries to stop the messenger, but Collatinus arrives at once (accompanied by Junius). He comforts his wife lovingly, but she feels that she will never be clean again. She stabs herself and dies. All mourn. Junius plans to use this crime by the prince to spark a rebellion against the king.

The Female Chorus is left in despair at the moral emptiness of this story. But the Male Chorus tells her that all pain is given meaning, and all sin redeemed, in the suffering of Christ. The two end the opera with a prayer.
