= Lucky-Peter's Journey =

Opera by Malcolm Williamson

Lucky-Peter's Journey is a 1969 opera, also called "a comedy with music," in three acts by Malcolm Williamson to an English libretto by Edmund Tracey (director for the English National Opera, formerly Sadler's Wells Opera) after the 1883 fairy-tale play Lycko-Pers Resa by August Strindberg.

== Background ==
The opera's commission is mentioned in the Twenty-fifth Annual Report of the Arts Council of Great Britain: "Sadler's Wells Opera revived Monteverdi's Orfeo (in Italian) and presented new productions of Berlioz' Damnation of Faust, Gilbert & Sullivan's Patience, Malcolm Williamson's Lucky Peter's Journey (commissioned under the Gulbenkian Foundation's scheme), Wagner's Valkyrie and, to mark the bicentenary, Beethoven's Leonora - hardly a routine list ."

Both the composer Williamson and the librettist Tracey wrote articles about the opera's development, the composer in The Musical Times and librettist in Opera

Tracey worked as a director for Sadler's Wells Opera. He and Stephen Arlen in planning for the 1967 season at Sadler's Wells considered what work they might present in operetta, a form that was successful with "both company and its audience." They thought about "commissioning a lightweight work from a living composer--something unpretentious, which could be easily learnt and performed by the company and which might have a wide appeal."

Williamson writes that "the directorate of Sadler's Wells" asked for a new opera at the conclusion of performances of another of his operas by that company. They gave specific direction for both Williamson and librettist Tracey: "the more palatable elements of The Violins, a number opera, possibly with spoken dialogue ... a piece to show off the company's spectacular talents; a phrase, is in the end, a hybrid, as much pantomime as opera." Williamson and Tracey struggled with how pantomime should be melded with opera to form a coherent work: "an opera it had to be, but with elements of the pantomime form built into the operatic structure."

Tracey confirms this approach writing "we eventually proposed to Stephen Arlen that we should try to produce an operatic variant on a pantomime theme, write a piece rather of the weight of Hansel and Gretel, with its wide variety of audience-appeal, and put it on for the Christmas season."

At Williamson's suggestion Tracey read Strindberg's Lycko-Pers Resa and was "immediately captivated by it, and excited to find that it contained features that I had included in [his first libretto for the commission] Dick Whittington: various rapid and virtually unexplained changes in scene, vivid contrasts of physical temperature--the whole action begins on a midwinter night and moves through spring into high summer--plenty of interesting small parts for the company, and above all the theme of a young hero questing for truth and happiness, rather like Tamino in The Magic Flute."

Aspects of pantomime were already in Lycko-Pers Resa, specifically two comedic parts that they gave to two women as a "sister act," rather than the two male clowns traditionally found in pantomime, "April Cantelo and Jennifer Vyvyan, for whom the composer wanted to write large parts ... the two sopranos are required to be two rats in the church tower, two birds in the forest, two gold diggers in the pleasure-dome and two martyred saints in the last act by the sea-shore."

The composer describes the opera, saying "... we have, to put it at its simplest, a pair of lovers (mezzo-soprano and baritone, contrary to the usual procedure). They meet, fall in love, are parted and reunited. The two male comics who permeate the panto are realized by two coloratura sopranos who are constantly reappearing as different characters. A good fairy and a gnome are the magic collaborators who propel the machinery of the narrative, and there is Peter's guide who indulges him, advises him, and leads him through the Land of Pleasure."

This hybrid work was designed by the Sadler's Wells' production team of John Cox, Dacre Punt, Francis Reid, and Talley Beatty to create an "interdependence between director, designer, lighting designer and choreographer, which goes far beyond what is normally asked for in the compartmentalized preparation of an opera. This interaction of dance and song is carried much further in Lucky-Peter's Journey."

== Performance history ==
The opera was premièred by Sadler's Wells Opera at the London Coliseum on 18 December 1969, conducted by John Barker. The opera had a planned run of fourteen performances through 26 February 1970, which production run was cut short. The performance on 5 February 1970 was broadcast on BBC Radio 3.

== Roles ==
Role	Voice type	Premiere cast, 18 December 1969 (Conductor: John Barker)
Lisa	mezzo-soprano	Shirley Chapman
Peter	baritone	Geoffrey Chard
First Lady (Nisse, The Robin, First Friend, First Saint)	soprano	April Cantelo
Second Lady (Nilla, Spring Bird, Second Friend, Second Saint)	soprano	Jennifer Vyvyan
Old Man	baritone	Harold Blackburn
Good Fairy	mezzo-soprano	Ailene Fischer
Loki	tenor	John Delaney
Steward/Death	tenor	Emile Belcourt
First Clerk	tenor	Peter Bamber
Second Clerk	bass	Ian Comboy
Third Clerk	bass	Robert Lloyd
Chorus: Chorus and Ballet of townspeople, monks, starboys, animals, trees, flowers, servants, beggars, camel-drivers, land monsters, sea monsters, pilgrims, ocean waves.

== Synopsis ==
Lucky-Peter's Journey is about a boy's journey of discovery that begins on Christmas Eve, the day he turns 15, when a Good Fairy grants him a wish for anything he desires. Peter had "been locked in a church tower by his father to protect him from the disappointments of life. He escapes on Christmas Eve and starts the process of discovering hard truths about power, corruption, vulnerability ... finding redemption in the end, through selfless love." This 'journey' has some aspects of a Hero's Journey.

Librettist Edmund Tracey describes the story he wrote and its characters: "The story of Lucky Peter's Journey starts on Christmas Eve ... in the course of the action [Peter] meets the girl, Lisa, without being able to express selfless emotion for her; acquires great wealth and political power; is offered spurious love and friendship by two professional vamps; tries to give himself up to nature; and finally has recourse to organized religion. At no point do these experiences bring him any lasting pleasure and he is reduced, in the last act, to total despair ... At this point, when he has experienced everything and found nothing that he values, he has another encounter with Lisa who explains to him 'In this life we receive only what we give' ... He suddenly sees clearly the state of his own heart, and is able to express his genuine need for Lisa's love and thus to express his own love for her."

=== Detailed Synopsis ===
==== Act I - A medieval church tower, dissolving into a forest ====
Christmas Eve. Peter and Staffan are heard singing the final hymn at the end of a Christmas Eve service. Two rats are a part of the scene along with Staffan and they eat porridge brought into the room by Staffan for the gnome. When they exit the gnome Loki materializes and finds the porridge bowl empty. Loki decides to punish Staffan for his missed porridge meal by helping Peter escape and he calls the Good Fairy who appears.

Loki asks if the Good Fairy can entice Peter their godson and lure Peter away from the tower. The Good Fairy says it is indeed time to send Peter out into the world where he will meet with trouble, and the suggestion is that this trouble will be a woman who at that moment can be seen and heard singing in the window of her house off in the distance. They decide Peter should go into the world with a companion, a girl his own age.

Peter enters and in conversation with the Good Fairy explains his longing to go out into the world. Staffan re-enters the room but is powerless to prevent Peter's escape when the Good Fairy beams a path of light from the tower window to the horizon which Peter uses to set out on his journey. The Good Fairy and Loki disappear.

Time passes.

On a brilliant icy morning in a forest, Peter lies by a frozen brook, asleep. Lisa enters and sees and wishes it were spring to unlock the prison snow of winter. Magically the whole scene transforms to spring. The frozen stream melts and the sky gives way to a warm spring-like glow. Peter slowly wakes up and looks into the clear water of the brook where he sees Lisa's reflection. Then she calls to him and they meet. He asks her to go with him to the Land of Pleasure and they kiss. Suddenly shy she runs off and disappears among the forest trees. Peter tries to pursue her but the trees block him. The act concludes with Peter deciding that gold will bring Lisa back to him and he leaves to obtain it.

==== Act II - Sc.1 - The Palace of Pleasure ====
Time has passed. Peter is now King in a golden Palace of Pleasure. In the dining hall of the palace, servants scurry about preparing a banquet, under the supervision of the Steward. When Peter enters, two servants clothe him in a long gold robe. The Steward and Three Clerks reveal that Peter is quite wealthy. Peter's wealth, however, means nothing to him if he cannot eat a meal when he wishes rather than be stifled by decorum.

An oriental reclining room appears and beyond this room is heard and eventually seen a caravan coming to rest with the camel-drivers and others singing. Peter is told to say farewell to his love (meaning Lisa). The scene continues with the First Friend and Second Friend, beautiful women who attempt to win Peter with flattery, attention, and affection while arguing between themselves about who is the best (the "professional vamps" or "golddiggers" of Tracey's description). Peter senses the presence of Lisa, who is briefly seen in the distance, and is disturbed. Inexplicably, Peter suffers a severe toothache. Peter's wealth is nationalized and the two ladies prepare to leave as the caravan reassembles. They then disappear into the desert night.

Peter now realizes that gold and power are useless in returning Lisa to him. In conversation with his Steward he learns of a greater power where corruption and poverty fight and the Steward will guide Peter through the land of pleasure to a brighter day. But first Peter must lead the poor and unemployed, the rich man's victims, as their Caliph, which he does, claiming to be the enemy of corruption, a reformer who will sweep the land clean.

==== Act II - Sc.2 - A dark wood ====
A black forest in a starless night with old bare trees moving in the dark. Lisa moves in a beam of light across the stage singing of Peter and his search. The Good Fairy and Loki emerge from the darkness and they tell Lisa she must wait until Peter needs her.

==== Act II - Sc.3 - A village square ====
A town square dismal with early morning autumn rain and thunder. The Three Clerks from the Golden Palace of Pleasure have braved the weather. They carry the bust of a corrupt and forgotten hero of bureaucracy, which they set on a pedestal. The Three Clerks represent the bureaucratic order that Peter, in Act II, Sc.1, has declared he will reform.

Beggars and townspeople enter with the Steward leading them carrying Peter shoulder high. The Three Clerks regard the newcomers as sacrilegious. Peter orders that the bust be removed and stands himself where it was. Peter declares himself Lord of All Power and he is robed as a king and crowned with an elaborate, jeweled turban.

A veiled bride is brought forward, but Peter rejects her because she does not love him and he does not love her. He begins recanting his former claim to be the enemy of corruption. He removes the turban, throws it away, and renounces his leadership, cursing the crowd's gold, women, and power, calling the Steward a High Priest of lies. A Juggernaut, previously assembled during Peter's denunciation under the direction of the Steward, rolls forward. Peter rushes out narrowly escaping being crushed.

==== Act III - A coastline, with a sailors' chapel on the shore ====
Peter walks along the beach littered with driftwood and ship wreckage considering himself a castaway, having decided that the world is false and hollow.

The waves rise and swell as in a storm. Peter backs away in fear; he turns and fantastic land monsters charge at him. Peter runs into the sea, but sea monsters slither up and menace him. He is thrown about in the air by the dancer-animals and finally is left on his knees, bruised and bewildered. He cries out in despair calling Death to him, who then appears.

A chorus of penitents with two martyred saints pass along the seashore and form a shrine. Peter and Death converse while the penitents sing the Dies Irae. Death tells Peter that if he needs company he should go to the shrine of the saints. Peter appeals to the shrine and a Wise Man emerges. Peter and the Wise Man speak about Peter's wishes. The Wise Man tells of his life when he left a bitter relationship only to be bewitched by the Christmas Ghosts (who are the Good Fairy and Loki, who now appear). The Wise Man reveals that the spell cannot be lifted until the Wise Man's son finds a faithful love. The Wise Man returns to the shrine.

Peter calls for Lisa to help him.

Loki confesses to the Good Fairy that he lied about the porridge, the rats ate it, so now they must try to put things right. They call to the seagulls to take Peter's plea to Lisa and far out to sea a little boat bearing Lisa comes into sight.

Peter cries to the Holy Saints and they emerge from the shrine and squabble between themselves about their sainthood but provide Peter no useful guidance.

Lisa's boat beaches on the shore. The Good Fairy and Loki compel Peter to confess his sins, which he does to the hooded Lisa whom he does not recognize. Peter confesses that he has found nothing of value on his journey but that he would give everything for his beloved Lisa.

Lisa reveals herself and they fall in each other's arms and declare their love for each other while the Wise Man emerges from the shrine--it is Staffan, Peter's father. The Good Fairy and Loki declare that the spell is broken. Staffan pronounces his benediction on Peter and Lisa. Peter and Lisa enter the boat to begin their life together and it disappears across the water.

== Reception ==
Reception was mixed. Christine Jennings, in a book about the life of Sir Robert Jennings, a distinguished judge, writes that he attended a performance with his family: "It was a disappointment - managing, in Robbie's words, to be 'both heavy and shallow'".

Tenor Emile Belcourt, who performed the role of Steward/Death in the London première, in an interview with Bruce Diffie, said in response to a question from Mr. Diffie about difficult performance situations and what is done, "Oh golly! Well, the piece comes off very fast, like Malcolm Williamson’s Lucky Peter’s Journey. I’m sure Malcolm wouldn’t like to hear that, but it was scheduled for many performances and they had to take it off because they didn’t get it right. Whereas his The Violins of Saint-Jacques was much more successful, as was his Our Man in Havana. But Lucky Peter was real failure."

In her obituary for the opera's librettist, Edmund Tracey, Elizabeth Forbes wrote, "The opera was given its premiere on 18 December 1969. Though strongly cast and well performed, it was not a success. The original play was pure fantasy, and Tracey had tried to introduce some realism, but neither children nor grown-ups in the audience enjoyed it."

Francis Wright was a fellow student of Williamson's son. Williamson gave his son and his classmates an "outing ... very kindly offered to all as a Christmas juant..." Ms. Wright says, "The work, based on a play by Strindberg, was pretty standard fare – not wonderful, but not terrible either, and I was more intrigued by the staging than the music ... Lucky Peter’s Journey was the Coliseum’s ‘panto’ – without the classic panto trappings. I don’t think we really enjoyed it very much, and we gloated over the fact that it apparently lost the place quite a lot of money. Unfortunately, any new opera does that."

Stephen Walsh, writing a review in The Observer, says the opera's idiom, like its predecessors, "is deliberately popular, and whatever you may say about this strange fusion of a Strauss-type symphonic texture with point numbers in the tradition of Richard Rodgers, you have to allow it two basic attributes: first, its undoubted appeal to a certain class of opera-goer; secondly, its very strong (even oppressive) individuality, which removes any doubt about [Williamson's] sincerity in writing it." He goes on to clarify the opera has a moral: "love is the only thing in life that mankind can both see and trust; and since this is a Christmas moral, the opera and the play, starts at Christmas-time, and reminds us that behind all human happiness is sadness and beneath all good motives a bad, selfish ones of which only true, self-forgetting love is free." Throughout the review Walsh uses pejorative terms like 'oppressive', 'strange', 'perfunctory', 'banality as an idea', 'tendency to meander', 'sense of incongruousness'. Walsh does, however, laud the production, "... the opera is superbly presented by its producer, John Cox. Dacre Punt's sets, most beautifully lit by Francis Reid are a model of how to get maximum value from a minimum of solid objects, with the chorus and so-called Movement Group brilliantly used as part of the scenery to suggest locality or season."

Writing in Opera magazine, Arthur Jacobs said that "the first thing to be said about it is that it is rather lacking in comedy, and lacking especially in comic incident. On the immediate criterion of a good, lively entertainment, children may well find this tedious as compared with other 'shows'; and if a small, naïve voice were to pipe up with 'But why aren't there any funny songs?' I should not find the question misplaced." Balancing his review, Jacobs says positively that "the music shows Williamson's remarkable facility: that is, readiness to find suitable moods, contrasts of pace, a jolly strain of intendedly 'popular' appeal, an exotic and picturesque touch ..." Yet Jacobs nonetheless argues that "the quality of 'engagement' and intensity is less clear ... what is the dramatic point of the change of idiom?" He concludes by echoing Stephen Walsh's sentiment regarding the production, saying "... the best thing about the evening was the magically opening 'world' of John Cox's production, with designs by Dacre Punt and lighting by Francis Reid. Here was imagination, application, and consistency to an extent which seems wanting in the work itself."

In Opera magazine, Christopher Webber says "Williamson was a magpie whose eclecticism worried critics much more than it did performers or audiences." Webber concludes, after discussing two previous Williamson operas, "... the luckless Lucky-Peter's Journey (Sadler's Wells Opera at the Coliseum, 1969), after Strindberg's picaresque play, scotched despite much good music by what many considered a staggeringly inept production."

A web site devoted to the British soprano Jennifer Vyvyan (authorized by her estate and curated by Michael White), who performed in several of Williamson's opera premières including Lucky Peter's Journey, calls the opera an "easy-listening (and happier) fairy tale for Christmas. Designed as a Sadlers Wells show for children, with a breezy fluency that owed something to Menotti although toughened up by spiky Tippett-like rigour ..."

== Recordings ==
BBC Radio 3's broadcast from 5 February 1970 was issued by the Oriel Music Trust in 2013 on two CDs (OMT 932), including the spoken introductions. The broadcast is also available as part of the Internet Archive.
