= Emelie Hooke =

Australian soprano (1912–1974)

Emelie Victoria Georgina Hooke (24 September 1912 – 9 April 1974) was an Australian soprano who was notable in opera, oratorio and concert, and sang in Australia, England, Europe and South Africa.

== Early life ==
Hooke was born in 1912 in Melbourne, where she was schooled. Her advanced musical training was at the Melbourne Conservatorium of Music. She sang frequently in opera and oratorio in Australia, and for two years was engaged by the Australian Broadcasting Commission. In 1931 and 1932 she sang in Handel's Messiah with the Royal Melbourne Philharmonic; the latter performance was with John Brownlee, the orchestra being conducted by Bernard Heinze. She won equal first prize in the Ballarat section of the Melbourne Sun-Aria Competition in 1932 (or 1931).

Hooke went to England in May 1933 for the greater opportunities there and to study under Sir Henry Wood and Herman Greenbaum. An operatic and vocal coach named Alfred Jones was commissioned by an English syndicate to accompany her and train her for a year. She also studied in Milan with Giannina Arangi-Lombardi and Vienna with Leon Rosenstock and Madame Bunzel. In Vienna she sang for Franz Lehár.

She sang in Italy and at the Croatian National Theatre, Zagreb, Yugoslavia, in 1938/39, and was noted as Verdi's Aida and Mimì in Puccini's La bohème. She returned to England when World War II began and concentrated on concert performances and radio broadcasting. She sang many times on the BBC Home Service and Third Programme, as well as appearing in oratorio in London and other cities, and singing 12 times at the Proms. Her Proms appearances spanned the years 1934 to 1950, and included arias and songs by Liszt, Wagner, Weber and Beethoven (including "Abscheulicher" from Fidelio), under conductors such as Sir Henry Wood, Basil Cameron and Sir Malcolm Sargent, and associate artists such as Dame Eva Turner and Dennis Noble.

On 5 November 1947, she sang alongside Kathleen Ferrier and Heddle Nash in Handel's oratorio Israel in Egypt, with the London Philharmonic Orchestra under Sargent. On 13 February 1944 she participated with Peter Pears and the pianist Walter Susskind in the UK premiere of Leoš Janáček's song cycle The Diary of One Who Disappeared. They broadcast it again on the BBC Home Service in late May or early June.

In 1946, Hooke appeared in the title role of Madama Butterfly as a guest artist at Sadler's Wells. She repeated this role in the Dublin season, and also sang Tosca in both Dublin and London (with the New London Opera Company). Her frequent collaborator was Dino Borgioli.

Hooke made a special study of contemporary music. She gave the world premiere of Anton Webern's Cantata for Soprano and Chamber Orchestra, Op. 29, at the 1946 ISCM Festival in London, with the BBC Symphony Orchestra conducted by Karl Rankl. Humphrey Searle said she was the only singer in Britain able to sing such music. She was also the first in the UK to sing Alban Berg's aria Der Wein.

In 1947, she and Joan Cross (the creator of the role) alternated as the Female Chorus in Benjamin Britten's The Rape of Lucretia at the Glyndebourne Festival. She repeated this role in the Netherlands, the Lucerne Festival in Switzerland, and at the Royal Opera, Covent Garden. Her associate artists included Kathleen Ferrier, Nancy Evans, Otakar Kraus and Richard Lewis, and the conductors included Reginald Goodall and Stanford Robinson.

On 10 February 1948, she took part as "Mater gloriosa" in one of the very early performances in the UK of Gustav Mahler's Symphony No. 8 "Symphony of a Thousand", with other soloists and the BBC Symphony Orchestra under Sir Adrian Boult. This performance was recorded and has been released. On 14 April 1948 she appeared in Beethoven's Missa solemnis along with Parry Jones and other soloists, and the BBC Symphony Orchestra and BBC Choral Society under Boult.

On 26 March 1949, she gave the premiere of the revised version of Sir Arnold Bax's song cycle The Bard of the Dimbovitza, with the BBC Symphony Orchestra under Sir Adrian Boult. Richard Arnell's setting of Shelley's Ode to the West Wind, his Op. 59, was written for Hooke, but she never sang it.

On 19 October 1953, she sang Gerhilde in Wagner's Die Walküre at Covent Garden under the conductor Fritz Stiedry, other roles being sung by Ramón Vinay, Sylvia Fisher, Hans Hotter, Edith Coates, Joan Sutherland and Monica Sinclair. A recording of a 1946 performance of the opera under Sir Thomas Beecham and the BBC Symphony Orchestra also exists.

Humphrey Searle wrote three settings of poems by Jocelyn Brooke, which Hooke performed at the Festival of Twentieth Century Music in Rome in April 1954.

On 17 June 1954, she created a role in the world premiere of Lennox Berkeley's opera A Dinner Engagement, at the Jubilee Hall Aldeburgh, with April Cantelo, Alexander Young and other singers, under conductor Vilém Tauský.

Hooke married and moved to South Africa, where she lived for almost 20 years until the late 1960s. Her married name was Honsen, although she always used Hooke professionally. On 27 November 1961, in Port Elizabeth, she took part in a broadcast performance of Elgar's The Dream of Gerontius. Webster Booth was among the cast.

In 1959 she recorded the Goethe-Lieder for mezzo-soprano and three clarinets by Luigi Dallapiccola. She also recorded songs by Paul Hindemith and Alban Berg, with Gerald Moore.

On her return to Britain she taught at the Guildhall School of Music for some time.

Hooke died in London on 9 April 1974, aged 61.
