= William Chappell (dancer) =

Dancer and pioneer of modern ballet, theatre designer and director (1907–1994)

- Chappell in the 1940s
- Born: William Evelyn Chappell; 27 September 1907; Wolverhampton, Staffordshire, England
- Died: 1 January 1994 (aged 86); Rye, East Sussex, England
- Other name: Billy Chappell
- Occupations: Dancer, ballet designer, theatre and opera producer and director
- Years active: Late 1920s – mid-1980s

William Chappell (27 September 1907 – 1 January 1994) was a British dancer, ballet designer and director. He is noted for being a pioneering dancer within the companies that formed the basis of the modern British ballet, and was also a celebrated theatrical stage and costume designer for more than 40 ballets or revues, including many of the early works of Sir Frederick Ashton and Dame Ninette de Valois. He also developed a distinctive writing style displayed in voluminous correspondence and in books on ballet, theatre design and on the life of his long-time friend Edward Burra. He had a career in opera production, his works being described "milestones in the rediscovery of baroque opera".

The Oxford Dictionary of Dance described him as "an enormously versatile talent".

In a memorial tribute at the end of his life, the dance writer Peter Brinston described Chappell as the "...creative spirit which helped to found the national ballet we have today."

It has been written of Chappell that he showed "a precocious and bewildering ability to express himself at a high level in all his chosen activities throughout a long career ... Elegant and well read, he was involved in many successes in revue, musicals, ballet, straight plays and opera."

== Early life ==
Chappell was born in Wolverhampton, the son of theatrical manager Archibald Chappell and his wife Edith Eva Clara Black (née Edith Blair-Staples). Edith, the daughter of an army officer, was raised in Ceylon and India; in pursuing a career in repertory acting, she moved away from her upper-middle-class roots and married twice to fellow actors, by the first of whom she had a daughter, Hermina, the second time being to Archibald Chappell, by whom she had two daughters, Dorothea and Honor, followed by Billy. Chappell was acutely aware of his apparently "déclassé" origins; whereas his mother's brother had maintained a conventional upper-middle-class life, being a tea-planter in Ceylon and able to provide his son, Patrick (who was close to Billy and spent time with his aunt's family in school vacations) with a private school and Oxford University education, Chappell studied at Balham Grammar School.

After his father deserted the family when he was still a baby, Chappell and his mother moved to 35 Dornton Road, Balham, London, where she pursued a career as a fashion journalist. Edith's daughter by her first marriage, romantic novelist Hermina Black, Chappell's half-sister, was living nearby in Wandsworth. Chappell studied at the Chelsea School of Art (Chelsea Poly) where aged fourteen he met fellow students Edward Burra, Barbara Ker-Seymer and Clover Pritchard (later de Pertinez) forging life-long friendships.

Clover de Pertinez recalls how Chelsea Poly was under the influence of Augustus John but not for her or her friends Ed Burra, Barbara Ker-Seymer and William Chappell: "We aspired to the smooth chic and sophistication to be seen on the covers of Vogue by Erte and George Lepape, to be found in the novels of Ronald Firbank, Scott Fitzgerald, Paul Moraud, Jean Giradoux, and above all in Diaghilev's Russian Ballets."

Chappell did not take up dancing seriously until he was seventeen when he studied under Marie Rambert, whom he met through his friend Frederick Ashton.

This awareness of his background leads to a distinctive self-deprecating tone detectable throughout his writings. For example, in his book Studies in Ballet he finds he needs to justify his writing by listing "any pertinent reasons I might have for raising my voice or flourishing my pen." His list begins "I had been a dancer myself" and worked with English and Russian companies. He wrote he had 'suffered in ballet class under Rambert, de Valois, Nijinska and Sergueef'. Additionally he had created roles in ballet and performed in most of the classics. In doing so he had worked in the same corps de ballet with Lichine, Shabelevsky, Jasinsky, Verchinina, and Ashton. He partnered Karsavina, Lopokova, Markova, Fonteyn, Argyle, May and Brae. Thus he had acquired a "wide and practical knowledge of ballet design and costume" and "knew dancers as people as well as performers".

Even this list is not complete. In his contribution to Peter Brinson's collection of talks The Ballet in Britain, under the heading Problems of Ballet Design, he lists the various people with whom he worked, took class, rehearsed and performed, which reads like a "who's who" of the 1930s ballet world. For example, he said that he was taught his role in L'Apres-midi d'un Faune by Woizikovsky.

== Career ==
=== Dance ===
Chappell recalls in his discussion "Problems of Ballet Design" in the collection The Ballet in Britain, "I was one of those monstrous children given to prancing around whenever anyone played the piano. I had a sort of urge for dancing." A friend, the socialite Lucy Norton, took him to see her friend Marie Rambert who immediately saw Chappell had promise as a dancer. He said "there were so few male dancers in those days she was delighted to have anybody, even me, so I started having classes:"

"... after a while I decided I was not going to be a very good painter so I took my dancing more seriously and started going to her classes properly."

Chappell notes that the only other male pupil Rambert had at the time was Frederick Ashton. Ashton and Chappell were life-long friends. Their early careers were closely connected and Chappell played an important role in providing friendship and support at critical moments in Ashton's career. In 1928, Ashton had moved to Paris to work with the Ida Rubinstein Company. Ashton was lonely, living in Montmartre in a flat belonging to the composer Lennox Berkeley. Chappell was passing through Paris at the time with Burra and they called on Ashton. Ashton was insistent that Chappell, now training with Rambert, should join the Rubenstein company under Nijinska's formidable leadership. He recalled:

'He nagged and nagged at me until finally I agreed... and the next thing I knew I was in...she was determined to have me for Fred's sake. She liked him so much that she was prepared to overlook my faults just to please him.'

Thus was formed a link between Ashton, Chappell, and Nijinska (and hence her brother Vaslav Nijinsky) who brought with her a complete philosophy of dance, ballet and movement. Ashton recalled for Julia Kavanagh the excitement and demands of the Nijinska class:

'Her classes were fascinating. They were never the same. She'd decide to do everything in waltz rhythm one day or everything in Spanish rhythm or syncopated rhythm. She brought the music to class, all worked out...and would one day do a whole class of Chopin with the most wonderful adages, another say a whole class of Bach, another day there'd be a whole class of nothing but tangos.'

For two years Chappell and Ashton toured Europe with Rubenstein's company under the direction of Massine and Nijinska. Chappell returned to London in 1929 to dance with Rambert's Ballet Club (later Ballet Rambert), the Camargo Society and Ninette de Valois's Vic-Wells Ballet becoming one of the founding dancers of British ballet. Throughout the 1930s he created more than forty roles for Rambert and Vic-Wells, including:

- The Rake's friend in de Valois's The Rake's Progress
- The popular song in Ashton's Facade
- The title role in Ashton's The Lord of Burleigh
- The recreation of two Nijinsky roles, Le Spectre de la rose and the faun in L'Apres-midi d'un faune

Billy Chappell had an important role in Rio Grande – or a Day in a Southern Port - the first production to showcase Burra's designs on stage – choreographed by Ashton, performed for the Carmargo Society and premiered on 29 November 1931 at the Savoy Theatre, London, in which he partnered Alicia Markova. The ballet was reprised in 1934 with Chappell becoming the first dancer to partner Margot Fonteyn. Fonteyn in her autobiography recalls how she developed a crush on Billy Chappell: "... who was so much the kindest of the awe-inspiring adults around me...." This crush coincided with the rehearsals for her first principle part in Rio: "Billy Chappell was a sailor and I was the girl he picked up. Thus I was provided most opportunely with an excuse to regard him affectionately while acting my role."

The recreation of the two Nijinsky roles Spectre de la Rose and L'Apres-midi d'faune, were works which had profound effects on the future development of modern dance and Chappell was able to play a significant part in bringing these works to later audiences.

Faun

Faun was Nijinski's first ballet which he choreographed, developing it with his sister Nijinska in 1910/11. The ballet historian Lynn Garafola notes:

"In front of the pier glass in the Nijinski family living room, where brother molded sister into the poses of Faun and Nymph, the ballet took shape."

Faun has been written about at length. To draw on one aspect, to illustrate the pioneering nature of the work, Garafola argues how this work, among other things, did something new with the presentation of sex on stage. In the final few bars of the ballet the faun performs a movement of the hips suggesting masturbation over a scarf discarded by a faun. Garafola notes that, at the time, on the stage, the presentation of sex was highly conventionalised. However:

"When transferred to the dance stage it amounted to a declaration of war against the received conventions of ballet. Indeed, into the eight minutes of Faune Nijinsky packed the essentials of ballet modernism, completing the revolution initiated by Fokine.'

In discussing the importance of this particular work, the scholar Peter Stoneley in his book A Queer History of the Ballet observes that in a few short years Diaghilev's Ballet Russe had transformed the ballet "from a spectacle that focuses on the female body to one that focussed on the man":

"Furthermore, the main figure, or the body in question, was not a limp form, but a muscular man with astonishing explosive energy [...] Even though he drew on fin de siècle resources, this was an escape from Wildean shame, and from physiological destiny, into a joyous process of free association."

Faun was first performed by Nijinski with the Ballet Russes on 29 May 1912, at the Theatre du Chatelet Paris. It was first performed by a British company by the then named Marie Rambert Dancers with Billy Chappell in the title role in April 1931 as recorded in The Times Ballet Club notice which said of at the Rambert Dancers' first full programme at its new London home, the Mercury Theatre in Ladbroke Grove that the Marie Rambert Dancers were now "... smoother and more precise in ensemble...." with Chappell's pièce de résistance, being L'Après-midi d'un faune and "the chief addition to the repertory".

Forty-eight years later, in 1979, Billy Chappell, along with his Rambert co-dancer Elizabeth Schooling, revisited Faun again, this time to teach it to Rudolf Nuyerev, as part of that season's Nuyerev season.

The historical significance of that performance, and its accomplishment in having its choreography accurately recalled drew public acclamation. The Times' ballet critic, John Percival wrote appreciatively:

'A particularly valuable achievement this year has been restoring Nijinsky's only surviving ballet, L'Apre-midi d'un faune, to public view in a worthy form. Preservation of the choreography is one of our many debts to Marie Rambert. William Chappell and Elisabeth Schooling, who learnt it under her guidance, were the advisers for Nureyev's productions with the Joffrey Ballet at the Mark Hellinger [theatre] in New York and Festival Ballet at the London Coliseum'

There is film of both Chappell's 1931 performance and that of the Joffrey Ballet and Nureyev restaging.

Screenshot of William Chappell's performance as the Faun as taught to him by a former member of the Ballet Russe. Compare with the image below – of the same work Chappell taught to Rudolf Nureyev.

For Chappell, the year 1979 was a moment of historic symmetry – he being the first to partner Fonteyn, Nureyev being the last (see list of performances by Margot Fonteyn) and also because it featured the celebrated Fokine ballet Spectre de la rose.

Spectre

Spectre de la rose, in the opinion of Cyril Beaumont, was a ballet created by Michel Fokine to exploit the talents of Vaslav Nijinski. First performed by Nijinski with Tamara Karsavina on 19 April 1911, at the Théàtre de Monte-Carlo as part of the Ballet Russe programme it was performed by Billy Chappell with Pearl Argyll (and on other occasions, Prudence Hyman) on 17 July 1932, as a Ballet Club presentation at the Mercury Theatre London.

Again this work has been widely discussed and many different versions of it are available to view. Beaumont describes it as a classical pas de deux, an adaptation of Gautier's little poem, the subject of which is the evocation of the spirit of the rose given to a young girl at a ball and that "Fokine's intention was to use Nijinski to create a poetical picture of the rose coloured sprite." He recalls it "achieved a furore whenever it was given", it was a "... genuine choreographic poem, so beautiful and intangible, that, when it was at an end, you were uncertain as to whether you had seen a ballet or had been momentarily dreaming."

Marie Rambert said of Nijinski's performance that when he danced Spectre she saw "... the very perfume of the rose, because in everything he extracted the essence."

It broke many conventions – not just the male wearing a rose petal costume, but also in the choreography. Fokine wrote of the rose:

'He is the spirit, he is the hope. He is the fragrance of the rose, the caresses of the gentle petals, and much more that defies description. He is in no circumstances a "cavalier", a ballerina's partner. The arm positions of the ballet are the opposite of the "correct" arm positions of the old ballet. The arms live, speaking and do not "execute positions".'

=== Design ===
His flair as a designer was encouraged by Rambert and for this he is also remembered. In parallel with his dance career he designed more than 40 ballets or revues, including many of the early works of Ashton and de Valois including:

- Antony Tudor's Lysistrata
- Compare this screen shot with the above – captured at the same time point – Chappell (above) with the help of Elizabeth Schooling taught from their respectuve memories, how the work was to be performed by Nureyev and the Joffrey Ballet
  Oxbridge partnership Norman Marshall & Geoffrey Wright's revue Members Only (With Charles Hawtrey and Hermione Gingold at the Gate Theatre Studio, 16A Villiers Street – 1937)
- Ninette de Valois' The Wise and Foolish Virgins, Bar aux Folies-Bergère and Fête polonaise (music by Glinka – 1941)
- Ashton's Les Rendezvous (music by Auber – 1936), Les Patineurs (music by Giacomo Meyerbeer, arranged by Constant Lambert – 1937) and The Judgement of Paris (music by Lennox Berkeley – 1938)
- Giselle and Coppélia for the Sadler's Wells Company
- Costume design for Ashton's Capriol Suite, (music, Peter Warlock's arr. sixteenth century peasant dances) and La Péri (music by Paul Dukas – 1931)

also

- The Blue bird (The Enchanted Princess), (music by Pyotr Tchaikovsky for the Vic-Wells Ballet – 1936)
- Frank Staff's The Seasons (music by Glasunov for Tudor's London Ballet – 1940) and the dance suite Tartans (music by William Boyce – 1940)
- Mona Inglesby's Amoras (music by Elgar for the International Ballet – 1941) and costume design for Everyman (music by Richard Strauss, arranged from the original scores by Ernest Irving – 1942)

His designs for Les Patineurs remained in the repertory and his conception for Les Rendezvous, although frequently revised, continues. He brought his vast experience of ballet design to opera, musical theatre, revues and drama, as both director and designer.

Chappell's work has appeared in costume design exhibitions for example in the 2013 show British Ballet Design of the 1930s held at Saffron Walden

=== Direction ===
Chappell has been credited as directing the following productions:

- The Lyric Revue (Lyric Theatre, Hammersmith and the Globe Theatre, London with Dora Bryan, Graham Payn and Ian Carmichael – 1951–1954)
- High Spirits (revue) (London Hippodrome with Cyril Ritchard and Diana Churchill – 1953)
- Sheridan's The Rivals (Saville Theatre, London with Laurence Harvey – 1956)
- Noël Coward's South Sea Bubble (Lyric Theatre with Vivien Leigh – 1956)
- Arthur Macrae and Richard Addinsell's revue, Living for Pleasure (Garrick Theatre with Dora Bryan, Daniel Massey, George Rose and Lynda Baron – 1958)
- Wolf Mankowitz's Expresso Bongo (Saville Theatre with Paul Scofield, Victor Spinetti, Millicent Martin, Susan Hampshire, Barry Cryer, Carol Ann Ford – 1958)
- Frank Loesser's Where's Charley? (Palace Theatre, London – 1958/59)
- Terence Rattigan's Joie de Vivre (Queen's Theatre, London, music by Robert Stoltz, lyrics by Paul Dehn with Donald Sinden, Joan Heal, Joana Rigby and Robin Hunter – 1960)
- On The Avenue (revue) (Globe Theatre Beryl Reid and George Rose – 1961)
- Passion Flower Hotel (Ambassador) 1965
- George Farquhar's The Beaux' Stratagem (Chichester Festival Theatre – 1967).
- The West End revival of Enid Bagnold's The Chalk Garden (Theatre Royal Haymarket, London with Gladys Cooper and Joan Greenwood – 1971)

=== Libretto and production ===
- The Violins of Saint-Jacques (1966). The work is dedicated to the conductor Vilem Tausky and his wife Peggy. Chandos, in its Great Operatic Arias series issued a recording of Cheryl Baker singing the aria How can I explain to you with the London Philharmonic Orchestra.

=== Opera ===
While undergoing military training in 1942 he designed stage settings, scenery and costumes for the Sadler's Wells touring production The Marriage of Figaro directed by Kurt Jooss. In 1947 Sadler's Wells Opera engaged him in producing and designing the revival of Vaughan Williams's The Shepherds of the Delectable Mountains. In 1966 Chappell joined Joan Cross, Ralph Koltai and Vilem Tausky as an artistic director of Phoenix Opera founded to tour the UK to enable greater access to operatic performances.

In 1970 he began teaching once a week at the London Opera Centre training young singers and musicians. The centre was housed in a former cinema which Chappell described as 'a very splendid huge art deco' building which offered 'a stage show as well as movies'

In October 1970 he designed and produced Samson for the Handel Opera Society performed at Sadler's Wells. In March 1973, for the Camden Festival he produced the first English language professional stage revival of Robinson Crusoé.

Two years later in the festival he produced Gaetano Donizetti's semi-serio opera Torquato Tasso for Opera Rara at the Collegiate Theatre. The cast included: Torquato Tasso sung by Christian Du Plessis, Eleanore d'Este sung by Janet Price, Roberto – Bruce Brewer, Don Gherhardo – Andrea Snarski, Eleanora di Scandio – Alexandra Browning, Alfonso d'Este – William Mason and Ambroglio by Noel Drennan. It was conducted by Kenneth Montgomery. A recording was made of this performance

He had a relationship with the Aldeburgh Festival. For the 1954 festival he produced A Dinner Engagement a one-act comic opera by Lennox Berkeley.

Ten years later he was back at Aldeburgh producing the English Opera Group's first performance English Eccentrics by Malcolm Williamson.

Chappell's work in opera was well regarded. For example, the opera critic and writer Ronald Crichton urged that Chappell's style of production should not be forgotten. In his memorial tribute to Chappell he wrote that Chappell worked with a 'freedom, flow and imaginative sweep utterly different from the effective, economical prettiness of, say, the early ballets he designed for Ashton' adding, '.. they were milestones in the rediscovery of Baroque opera and deserve to be remembered'.

=== Cinema ===
Chappell played the part of the court painter Titorelli in Orson Welles' The Trial (1962 film), based on the Kafka novel of the same name (along with many of the other actors in the film, his voice was dubbed by Welles himself).

== Military service ==
At the declaration of war in 1939, Billy Chappell was the first male dancer to join up, spending the entire duration of the war up to the end of 1945 in uniform.

In 1991 he was asked to recall how he happened to enlist. He described joining up as a "fit of mad patriotism". He summed up his entire military career in the phrase: "It's like a sort of mysterious nightmare".

Asked if the recruiting officers were surprised "you being a dancer there..was it difficult?" Chappell hesitates and says, 'Well, no':

"... I went and saw this man and he said, 'I know just the place for you. I shall send you to the Royal Artillery School of Survey.' Now, Royal Artillery Survey, is one of the most complicated things, all mathematics, which I was absolutely idiot at."

LGBTQ+ and military policy

Billy Chappell was thereby recruited into the military at a time when homosexuality was illegal. This outright ban was later modified into a general exception stating: "no person subject to service law who was gay, lesbian, transgender or transitioning due to gender dysphoria, or who was perceived to be such, even if they were not in fact, could be or remain a member of the armed forces.".

In May 2022 Terence Etherton, Baron Etherton chaired an inquiry into the treatment by the military of LGBTQ+ people: His report described the military policy as a "stain on the illustrious history of the UK's armed forces". The Etherton report acknowledges that in WWII conscription inevitably resulted in a significant number of LGBT military personnel in all three services, noting "many served with distinction". The report described the recruitment policy at that time as "leave alone attitude" which even continued for a short time after 1945.

Chappell was at first posted (in 1940) to RA School of Survey, at Preston Barracks, Brighton moving onto RA Larkhill and then Officer Cadet Training Unit (OCTU) in Ilkley, West Yorkshire.

Haining Report and the new Army Welfare Service

While Billy Chappell was learning how to become an artillery officer, the Government was making plans which were to fundamentally change his military career.

It appointed Lt General Robert Haining to chair a three-person inquiry which among other things was to consider "the provision for (i) welfare and (ii) recreation needs for the Army". His committee reported in May that year and was quick to recommend (at para 160 (xii)) that "every encouragement should be given to the Army to form its own concert and entertainment parties". Haining said that his committee felt sure 'there must be a great volume of talent in the Army today which only requires encouragement and organisation to enable the Army to find a large measure of entertainment from its own resources'' The report said (at para 116) that it was important that [for welfare generally] reliance should not be placed solely on .. external resources.

The report was enacted with Henry Page Croft (Under-Secretary of State for War) telling Parliament in late 1940 : "Every unit in my opinion should have its own welfare and entertainment officer from its own establishment."

Based on the Haining Report, the British Army established the Directorate of Welfare (referred to as Army Welfare Services or AWS), which would assist the regimental officer in identifying what welfare services were available, how they could be delivered, and help the Army become more self-sufficient when it came to entertainment.

In the Royal Artillery among the officers ushered into this new pioneering role was Cadet Chappell who recalls that at the end of his training in Yorkshire he was "grabbed": "I was grabbed because they discovered I'd been mixed up in the theatre.

"I was always grabbed to do entertainments. The minute I got anywhere, of course, [there were] thousands of wretched, miserable troops stranded, waiting to be sent off somewhere, [they] had to be entertained."

And Second Lieutenant Chappell (as he had now been promoted) proved Haining was right. Chappell recalls how he discovered the necessary talent by simply going around and finding out if anybody plays an instrument, plays the piano, blows a trumpet, sings and "who can do this, who can do that. And it was amazing, the amount of talent."

North Africa, Italy and Naples 1944

First he served in North Africa with his work being noticed in the forces newspaper Union Jack (Second African edition) The paper reported on the Royal Artillery Training Depot concert party, the 'Beachcombers', which was in its eleventh edition: '..a gigantic bit of work within the space of four months.' The paper noted Lieut. William Chappell, formerly of the Sadler's Wells ballet, as producer.

Chappell had at least one friend in high places: In December 1943 he wrote to Fredrick Ashton from BNAF (British North Africa Force) that while he was 'pretty depressed one way or another' he was working on a plan 'to get my Colonel to send for me when he gets his regiment together and get myself settled down for the duration ... and after all its not everyday one finds a Colonel who brings you violets from Algiers and pottery bowls from Biskra.'

Second-lieutenant Chappell was posted to the Army Welfare Services (AWS) in Italy on 14 March 1944 with "medical category A" . By June 1944 he was promoted to Captain and attached to the rear echelon in Naples.

In 2026 a small cache of Chappell's wartime letters to his friend Freddie Ashton were offered for auction. (The subsequent purchaser of these letters is not known) These letters, together with entries in Edward Burra's letters edited by Chappell in Well Dearie give the following dates and postings:

Summer 1943 – Algeria, Tunisia

March 1944 – Naples

May 1944 – Taranto (Province of Apulia)

June 1944 – Rome

October 1944 – Siena (Province of Tuscany)

September 1945 – Naples

=== Naples 1944 ===
His first eighteen months of service, and his feelings about being in the Army, are recounted in the essay 'The Sky Makes Me Hate It' commissioned by John Lehmann and published by him in Penguin New Writing Number 13 of 1942.

The biographers of Burra and Ker-Seymer have interpreted Chappell's mood in his writing as having a war in which, paradoxically, he saw less fighting than Edward Burra living in Rye, East Sussex.

Whatever else could be said about Rye (and there is no doubt Rye was a dangerous place, and for ordinary citizens, life was very difficult) it was unlike Naples. In 2024 the work of military historian Keith Lowe was published, being the first English language comprehensive account of Naples in 1944 and its aftermath. The book details the multiple disasters facing Naples "at that time the most populous city in Italy, the first major metropolis in the whole of mainland Europe to be liberated by the Western Allies. .. [where] they found the city in a state of absolute crisis – hundreds of thousands of people on the brink of starvation, law and order non-existent, much of the city in ruins."

Daily vast numbers of troops arrived expecting Naples – as they had been promised – to provide abundant opportunities for rest and relaxation. That is not what was found – the result was widespread military indiscipline, insubordination, looting and outright criminality, drunkenness, rampant sexual violence and venereal disease. Lowe details how the Italian invasion into Naples – and the mezzogiorno generally – was fraught with problems; the campaign had been one military disaster after another, poor intelligence, lack of precision in understanding the consequences of the Italian military surrender, poor appreciation of the Neapolitan civil insurrection of 1943 (the Four days of Naples – in Italian: Quattro giornate di Napoli) The population had been subject to a reign of arbitrary terror; random arrest, detention and deportation, public executions, torture, and Allied aerial bombardment and finally the complete destruction of all civilian facilities by retreating German army sappers. In addition there was an epidemic of typhus, and Vesuvius erupted.

It is into this world that Chappell stepped – as if he had passed into the paintings by his friend Ed Burra.

The Allied forces faced an immediate crisis: What to do with thousands of military personnel promised Mediterranean rest, relaxation and comfort and divert them from cheap drink and rife prostitution. Lowe describes the various desperate attempts adding : "The other approach used by the Allies to rein in their soldiers was to try and provide them with alternative, more wholesome entertainment. In this way "entertaining the troops" became a military priority.

=== Taranto, Siena and Rome ===
Now promoted Captain (Welfare) Chappell served not only Naples, further south in Taranto, and north of Campania in Florence and Siena and onto Rome, with his work receiving occasional official recognition.

For example, an entry for the AWS War Diary for 23–28 October 1944 reads "... in Siena Welfare AAI produced a show Goodnight Siena, it ran for one week, very popular, produced by Captain W.E. Chappell, R.A."

And again, in November 1944: "16-17 November in Siena Capt. W.E. Chappell organised another talent spotting show at Rex theatre – great success."

He is listed as being appointed to Army Welfare Services as a Staff Captain (S/Capt) for 15th Army Group at the beginning of January 1945. This was a senior rank – it would have involved dealing with the top brass including General – eventually Field Marshal Harold Alexander, 1st Earl Alexander of Tunis.

Billy Chappell's surviving letters home to his friends reveal a different picture. In a letter dated February 3, 1944 to Frederick Ashton he laments:

"I go on the same old routine, doing these terrible, terrible shows, which get more and more boring, and editing the ghastly weekly paper, which is like a school mag, only worse. I am starved, starved, starved for people, and for someone or something to encourage the things in me that have any meaning."

He had considerable administrative responsibility, a war weariness with a withering contempt for some of his fellow officers, writing of what release from Army life would mean: "No more having one's life directed by morons one wouldn't even trouble to spit at in the ordinary way." He is running his department "single-handed as my major has gone. A mystic stooge has arrived who used to work on the music side with the Wells Opera Company. He's a pessimist and pretty stupid and talks too much, which is a fault nearly everybody suffers from." A letter from HQ 59 Area CMF May 23, 1944 Taranto reinforced Lowe's point made in his book on soldier morale in Naples:

"When they booze they get arrested, when they fuck they get VD and then its off to that gay old front line again. And the whole setup is so hideous, only pathetic, it breaks one's heart when one remembers one has a heart, and one isn't just wrapped up in an awful bored indifference and disgusted by the silly mess everyone makes of everything and the total lack of any sort of idea or appreciation of what there is in life.

==== Rome June 1944 ====
In June 1944 Chappell arrives in Rome writing to remind Freddie Ashton of the last time they were together in the city, in 1929, as dancers performing at the capital's major opera house the Teatro Costanzi, (Teatro dell'Opera di Roma) with the Ida Rubenstein dance company "whose only memories for me are sore feet and eating ham rolls in the Colosseum ... I doubt if I shall manage to see in weeks the amount we crammed into that one day years ago and when we flung our coppers into the Trevi Fountain I little imagined the circumstances under which I would return."

==== Cassino ====
In the same letter he tells Ashton "we came through Cassino on the way up: 'I cannot begin to tell you what it's like or the profound and strange impression it made on me. I realise that as a "base boy" one doesn't begin to know what the war is apart from frustration and ordinary nerve strain from being always with uncongenial people...." It is also unlikely that Freddie Ashton understood fully the cataclysm visited upon the people and its town – its complete obliteration through a combination of the retreating German army and the combined assaults of the British and American land and air forces. The catastrophe is marked by regular dramatic performances held in the town but also a notable museum – Museo Historiale in Via S. Marco created by Carlo Rambaldi, in a strange echo of Chappell's interests, a man who was a winner of three Academy Awards for special effects for the films King Kong, Alien and E.T. The result is Italy's first multimedia museum dedicated to a military conflict.

Comments on Army physical training

Chappell was a critic of military physical training techniques.

In his book Studies in Ballet he emphasises the way in which over many generations dancers have learnt how to 'warm and loosen the limbs, to produce a general feeling of elasticity, well-being and controlled strength'. He makes those points which are now commonplace in exercise instruction: warm up slowly, and stay warm, warm down afterwards and so on.

He writes that he does not want to suggest "the Admiralty, the War Office and Air Ministry that the British Forces should be transformed into a vast corps-de-ballet (although it's an idea that I do not find unpleasing)".

He describes an occasion ("at the risk of being a war-bore") in North Africa when his company had no transport and had to march to their destination about eighteen miles away. He used this story to illustrate the benefit of ballet training to legs and feet, allowing a middle-aged man to arrive fresher than men nearly half his age, who had only received the routine Army physical training. He also emphasised the importance of a long unbroken tradition and continuity in the training of male dancers. He was of the opinion that the war was a factor that had caused chaos in the Sadler's Wells Company and rendered valueless years of work. He contrasted the treatment of the ballet in England and in Russia, where male dancers were considered important enough in their work to be kept in it.

Demobilisation 1945

The available records do not make it clear when Captain Chappell was actually demobilised. His active service life – as recorded in the available documents – comes to a sudden end on April 20, 1945.

His subsequent account of his demobilisation, given in 1991, that is forty-six years after the event, is at odds with what is known about the process.

It is not known what he did – or indeed where exactly he was – between April and Christmas 1945 when he was back in London.

In the 1991 recording Chappell said that after all the action was finished, he discovered a friend of his "one of the people I liked very much in the army, who was a sort of sympathetic character, was being demobbed. His time had come: "And I thought, well, if he's going back, I should be going back too. And I said, well, I'm coming with you. I said, I'm not going to tell anybody. I'm just leaving. I'm sick of it. That's enough". The war was over, you know."

Chappell said that when he walked into the demobilisation office he saw the responsible officer was a man he knew and he said, "Chappell .. where the hell have you been? You should have been here a year ago. Oh! And I thought, my God, the sods [not to have informed me]'.

Postscript on military service

In December 1945 the British Army newspaper, The Crusader, carried a piece by Benjamin Britten on troops returning home from Italy with a passion for opera. He writes that attendance figures for opera in the Italian theatre had "astonished the highbrows at home who thought such things were above mere soldiers...." He concludes that "the new interest is due in the main to the work of the Sadler's Wells Company, which performed continuously before the public throughout the war years, [and] is now being greeted at home with great enthusiasm by an enormous audience composed predominantly and notably of young folk." Among those mentioned in the piece is one Captain William Chappell "serving in British North Africa Force and Central Mediterranean Force".

== Personal life ==
Chappell's personal life was bound up with that of close friends. For example, Barbara Ker-Seymer's biographer writes that Barbara, 'having turned her back upon her family', surrounded herself with a close-knit group of friends who became '... a life-long surrogate family, far more beloved and important than any blood relatives. At its core were three gay men: the artist Edward Burra, the ballet dancer William Chappell and the choreographer Frederick Ashton'.

A moment of friendship between a Royal Artillery officer, 2nd-Ltn William Chappell and his life-long friend Edward Burra captured by their mutual life-long friend Barbara Ker-Seymer. Fitzroy Square, London July 1942.

The Dictionary of National Biography states emphatically that Edward Burra and William Chappell were lovers, but provides no source for this assertion. Burra's biographer, Jane Stevenson, says there is no evidence for this statement and that whatever anyone may have seen fit to imply, he and Burra were not lovers. She goes further and writes that by 1971, William Chappell and Burra had known one another for 50 years,'.. during which time they never seemed to have quarrelled. Their dependence was mutual. Burra's practical need for his friend was intense ...' She quotes Chappell as saying for his part, he got 'smoothed out' when visiting Burra at his home. Stevenson concludes that 'though sex was not an aspect of their relationship, many marriages have been shorter and have involved less mutual commitment'. William Chappell may be making his own comment on his relationship with Edward Burra by including in his edited collection of Burra's letters, a photograph (reproduced here) taken by their mutual friend Barbara Key-Seymer. It shows them together sitting on a bench beneath a typical London plane tree in Fitzroy Square. Chappell inserts this image for a specific date – July 18, 1942, he in the uniform of a Royal Artillery officer. Key-Seymer's biographer describes this image in touching terms: ' ... Billy's arm draped behind Ed with the other arm on his [Burra's] lap almost touching his friend's hand'. Another version of this picture – with Ed Burra playing with Chappell's officer's cap is used by Stevenson in her biography.

Burra's biographer writes that Billy Chappell did not acquire a boyfriend until 1928 who was John Davies Knatchbull Lloyd. Stevenson notes how in this relationship, in which Chappell by no means could be described as 'rough trade', he was 'managing to pass in a set particularly sensitive (and antagonistic) to symptoms on non-U speech and manners'.

While working in Paris in the period 1928-1929 Frederick Ashton and Chappell not only shared a small flat but also a bed, as it turned out, by necessity (the flat being small) and with a large bolster separating them. Ashton's biographer writes that as the couple shared a double bed it was assumed they were having an affair. 'Invariably together, they made an odd couple: Ashton conservatively dressed in a neat double-breasted suit, collar, tie and trilby; Chappell 'looking very fanciful and Montparnassian'.

In the summer of 1960, Chappell was the subject of what in later years would be called a public homophobic shaming. He was directing Terence Rattigan's musical version of his play French Without Tears, a show entitled Joie de Vivre. The show was panned by the critics and it closed after three days. Rattigan's biographer,Geoffrey Wansell revealed that the immediate aftermath of the closure was a 'bout of verbal fisticuffs between Rattigan and the critic Kenneth Tynan'. Wansell wrote that Tynan's review was not only 'predictably adverse but insulting to boot.' Tynan somehow thought it was relevant to his demolition job on the show to describe its director as 'Michael Benthall en cocotte' (that is having the qualities of a prostitute). Chappell thought the homosexual tones of the remark actionable (as it has nothing at all to do with the qualities of the performance, one way or another). Rattigan in a letter to Tynan said he would try and prevent Billy Chappell from doing this. It is worth noting that Benthall was a gay man – a theatre director – living more or less openly with Chappell's former ballet colleague Robert Helpmann at a time when homosexuality was unlawful and being subject to severe criminal penalty – see LGBTQ rights in the United Kingdom.

He was invited by writer and lecturer on dance Peter Brinson to take part in a series of eight lectures on 'The Ballet in Britain' at Oxford University where he entertained an academic audience with his thoughts on problems of ballet design. Other speakers included Dame Ninette de Valois director of the Royal Ballet, Marie Rambert, Arnold Haskell, William Cole and Douglas Kennedy

=== Rye, East Sussex ===
Since his teenage years, Chappell was a frequent visitor to Rye, East Sussex, at first to Ed Burra's family home at Springfield and in later life renting homes either in Romney Marsh or in Rye.

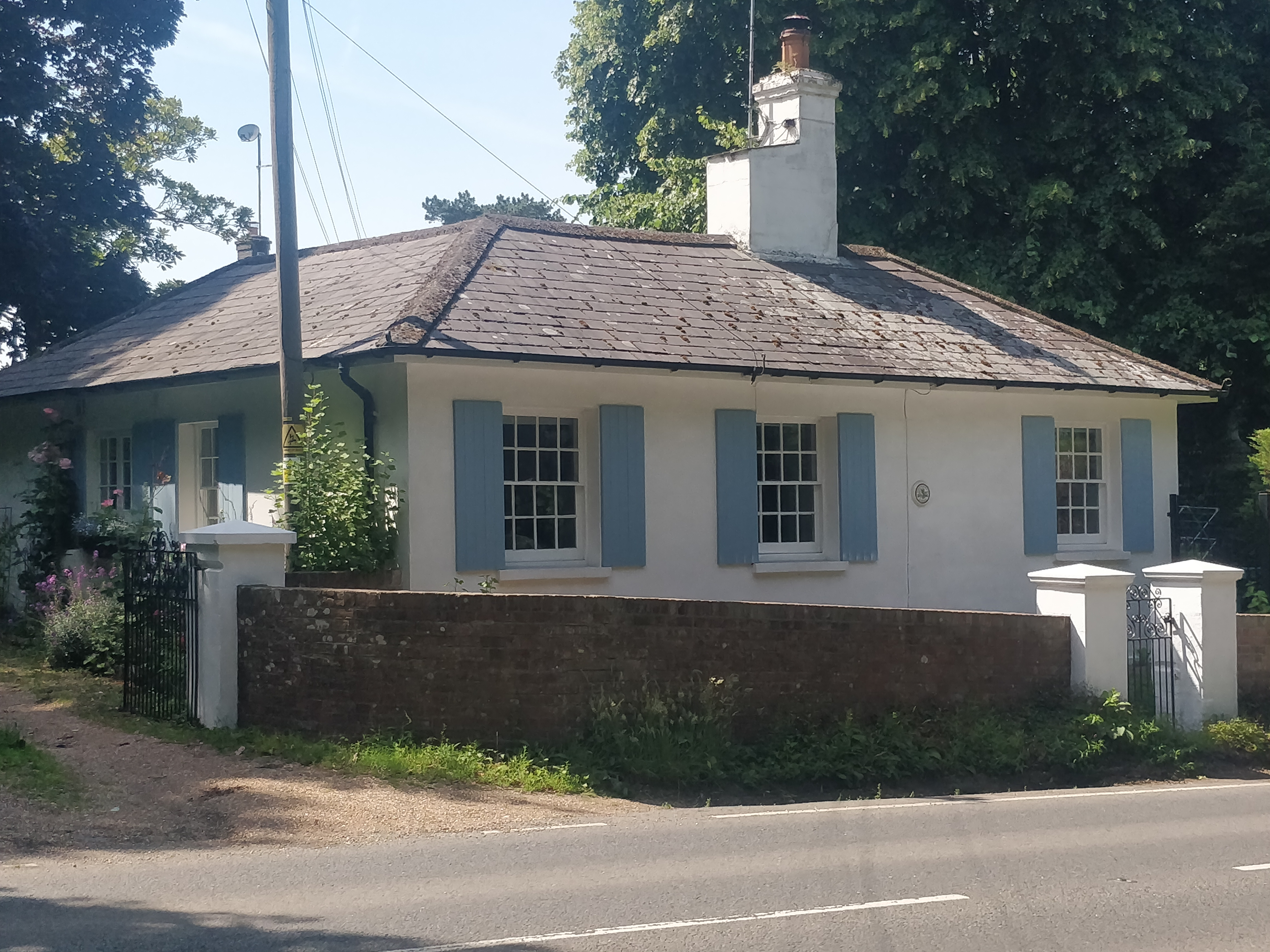
2 Springfield Cottage, Playden, Rye – Edward Burra's final home and where Billy Chappell was a regular guest.

In Burra's later life he moved into a cottage situated on the edge of the grounds of Springfield – 2 Springfield Cottages. Billy Chappell visited regularly and it was in this house that Billy nursed his friend in what was to be Ed Burra's final illness. In 1970 Burra bought Chappell a house in Rye at 23 Rope Walk. Chappell recalled 'I think originally, Edward saw the house and he said, do you want that house? He paid the rent because I was rather broke at the time.' On Burra's death the house passed to his sister Anne. Chappell said: 'When it became her property, she said, well, I don't want it, I'm going to give it to you'. Billy Chappell lived there for the next 23 years, until his death in 1994.

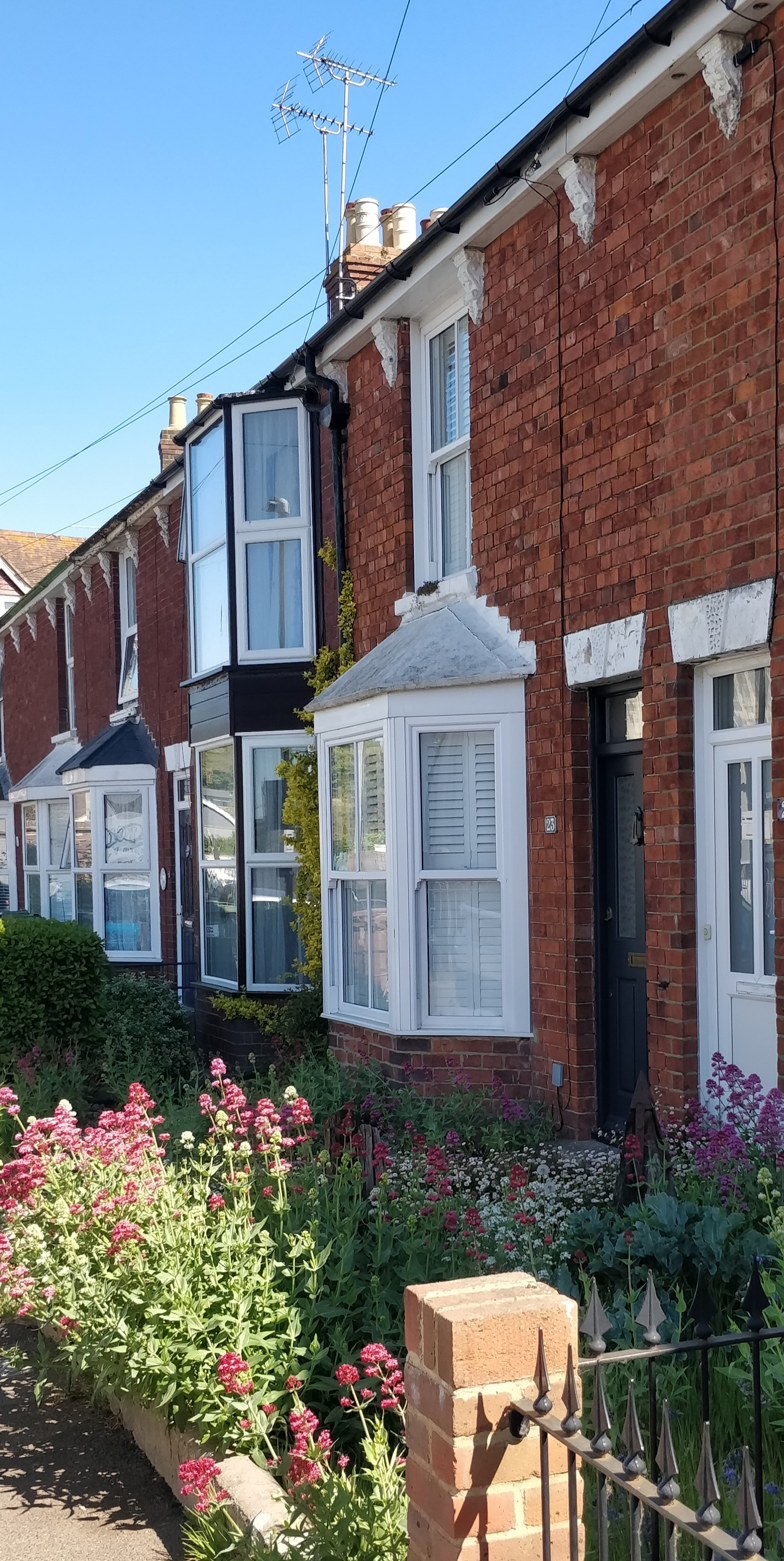
The house Edward Burra gave to William 'Billy' Chappell in 1970.

== Filmography ==
- Nijinsky (1980) – credited, along with Elisabeth Schooling, for the sequences that feature the restaging of L'Après-midi d'un Faune
- The Trial (1962) – as the painter Titorelli
- Expresso Bongo with Paul Scofield (BBC recording of Saville Theatre, London production, 1958) – Director
- The Prince and the Showgirl (1957) – dance arranger
- Moulin Rouge (1952) – dance director
- Flesh and Blood (1951) – Dancer (uncredited)=
- Golden Arrow (1949) – costume designer
- The Winslow Boy (1948) – costume designer
- Le Lac des Cygnes with Margot Fonteyn, Robert Helpmann and the Vic-Wells Ballet Company on BBC Television (13 December 1937) – as Benno
- Job with Robert Helpmann, and the Vic-Wells Ballet Company (now The Royal Ballet) produced and choreographed by Ninette de Valois on BBC Television (11 November 1936) – as Elihu/The Three Messengers.†

† This was the second broadcast of ballet on British television following the official start of the BBC high definition television service on 2 November 1936.

== Bibliography ==
- Development of the Ballet, William Chappell, in New Writing and Daylight (Summer 1943) Edited by John Lehmann. Hogarth Press. London (1943)
- The Sky Makes Me Hate It, William Chappell, in Penguin New Writing Number 13 (April – June 1942) Edited by John Lehmann. Penguin Books.
- Words from a Stranger, William Chappell, in Penguin New Writing Number 19 (October – December 1944) Edited by John Lehmann. Penguin Books.
- Studies in Ballet, William Chappell, John Lehmann Ltd, London (1948) ISBN 978-1340914226
- Fonteyn: Impressions of a Ballerina, William Chappell, Rockcliff Publishing Corporation Ltd, London (1951)
- Problems of Ballet Design, William Chappell in The Ballet in Britain, Edited by Peter Brinson, Oxford University Press (1962)
- Chappell, William (1982). Edward Burra: A painter remembered by his friends. HarperCollins. ISBN 978-0233974507.
- Chappell, William, ed. (1985). Well Dearie!: The Letters of Edward Burra. London: Gordon Fraser Gallery. ISBN 978-0860920762.
- Knights, Sarah (2023). Thoroughly Modern: The Pioneering Life of Barbara Ker-Seymer, Photographer, and her Brilliant, Bohemian Friends. Virago. ISBN 978-0-349-01151-6.
- Beaumont, Cyril (1938). The Complete Book of Ballets. London: Puttnam.
- Etherton Terrance (May 2022) LGBT Veterans Independent Review London HMSO
- Fokine, Michel (1961). Chujoy, Anatole (ed.). Fokine – Memoirs of a Ballet Master. Boston: Little Brown and Company.
- Lowe, Keith (2024). Naples – War, Liberation and Chaos. London: William Collins. ISBN 9780008339630.
- Commencing in 1991 a life-story recording with William Chappell was made by Cathy Courtney and Caroline Cuthbert for a series called 'Artists' Lives', British Library reference C466/06. The complete recording consisting of twelve tapes is available for access through the British Library's Listening and Viewing Service. For ease of reference quotes taken from these recordings are listed as 'Chappell (1991)' together with the relevant tape number and time mark.
