= List of performances by Margot Fonteyn =

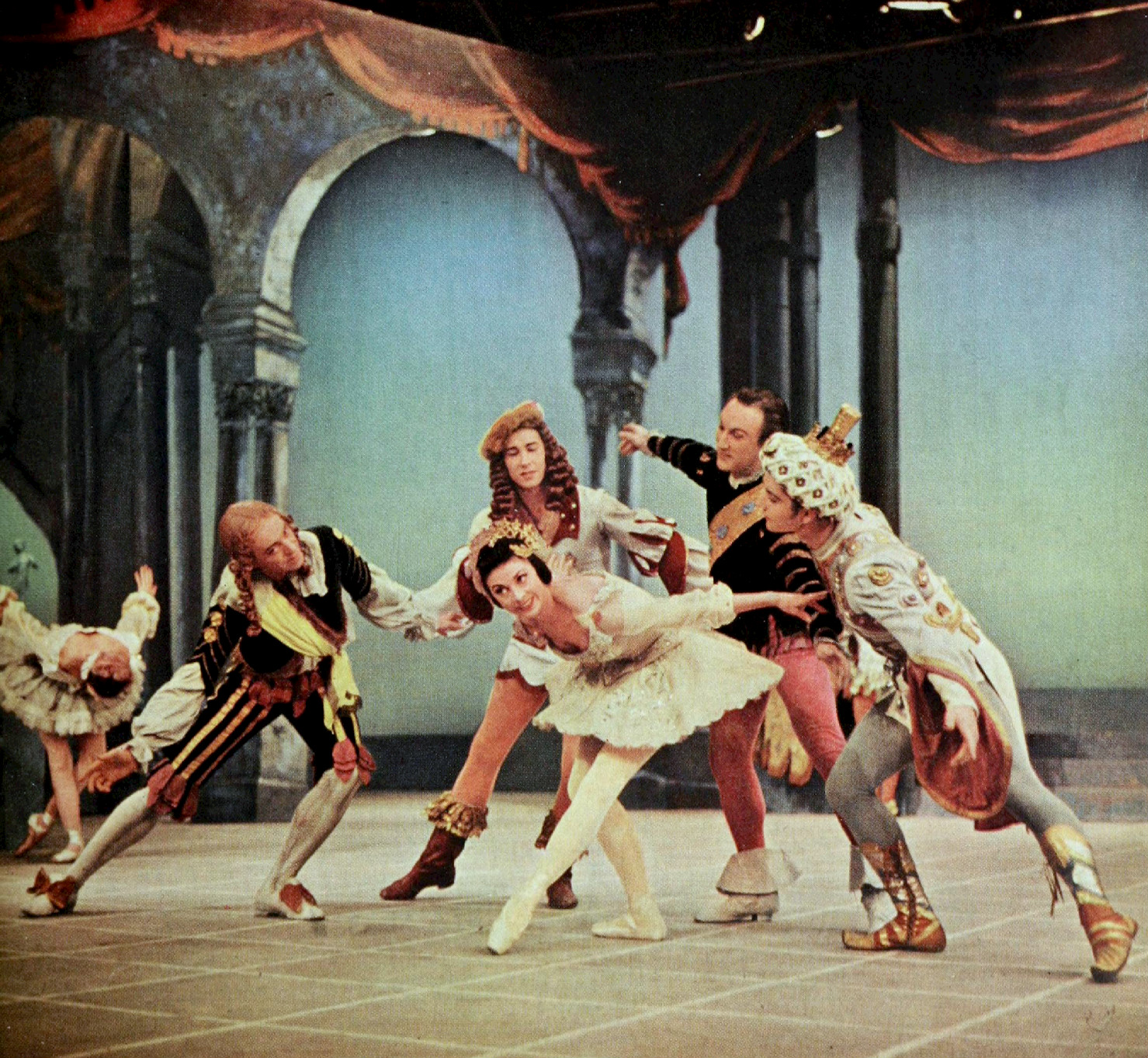
Fonteyn performing in a colour broadcast of The Sleeping Beauty, Producers Showcase, 1956

Dame Margot Fonteyn, DBE (18 May 1919 – 21 February 1991), stage name of Margaret Evelyn de Arias, was an English ballerina. She spent her entire career as a dancer with the Royal Ballet, eventually being appointed Prima Ballerina Assoluta of the company by Queen Elizabeth. She joined the Vic-Wells Ballet School at the age of 14 and from 1935 was the prima ballerina of the company, which would later be called the Sadler's Wells Ballet and the Royal Ballet. In 1959, though still tied to the Royal Ballet, she was allowed to perform as a freelance dancer to enable her work as a guest dancer with various international companies. Though she officially retired in 1979, she occasionally appeared as a dancer through the late-1980s.

== Stage ==
Unless otherwise stated, performances occurred at the Royal Opera House in Covent Garden, London. The list is incomplete.

=== 1930s ===
Year	Title	Version	Role	Notes
1934	The Nutcracker	choreography by Marius Petipa, music by Tchaikovsky	Snowflake	debut performance with the Vic-Wells Ballet
1934	The Haunted Ballroom	choreography by Ninette de Valois, music by Geoffrey Toye	Young Tregennis	first solo role
1934	Les Sylphides	choreography Michel Fokine, music by Frédéric Chopin	Mazurka	
1934	Swan Lake	by Tchaikovsky	cygnet	
1934	The Lord of Burleigh	choreography by Sir Frederick Ashton, music by Felix Mendelssohn	Lolly Willowes	
1934	Rio Grande	choreography by Frederick Ashton, music by Constant Lambert, designs by Edward Burra	Creole Girl	first partnered role with William Chappell
1935	Les Rendezvous	choreography by Frederick Ashton, music by Daniel Auber / arranged by Constant Lambert	female lead	first leading role
1935	The Haunted Ballroom	choreography by Ninette de Valois, music by Geoffrey Toye	Alicia	
1935	Façade	choreography Frederick Ashton, music by William Walton	Polka dancer and Tango dancer	
1935	Le Baiser de la Fée	choreography Frederick Ashton, music by Igor Stravinsky	Young Bride	role created for her by Ashton
1935	Swan Lake	by Tchaikovsky	Odette	Odile was danced by Ruth French.
1936	Apparitions	choreography Frederick Ashton, music by Franz Liszt / arranged by Constant Lambert	Woman in the ball gown	
1936	Nocturne	choreography by Frederick Ashton, music by Frederick Delius	Flower girl	Fonteyn was the first to dance the role in the ballet's debut performance.
1936	The Nutcracker	by Tchaikovsky	Sugar Plum Fairy	
1937	Giselle	choreography Jean Coralli, Jules Perrot, as revised by Marius Petipa; music by Adolphe Adam	Giselle	
1937	Les Patineurs	choreography Frederick Ashton, music by Giacomo Meyerbeer	female role, pas de deux (with Helpmann)	
1937	A Wedding Bouquet	choreography Frederick Ashton, music by Lord Berners	Julia	
1937	Carnaval	choreography by Michel Fokine, music by Robert Schumann	Columbine	
1937	Pomona	choreography by Frederick Ashton, music by Constant Lambert	Pomona	
1938	Horoscope	choreography by Frederick Ashton, music by Constant Lambert	The young woman	
1938	Swan Lake	by Tchaikovsky	Odette-Odile	First performance of the dual role of Odette and Odile
1938	The Judgement of Paris	choreography by Frederick Ashton, music by Lennox Berkeley	Venus	
1939	The Sleeping Beauty	by Tchaikovsky	Aurora	2 February performance was a gala to benefit the Housing Centre; 22 March performance was a command performance for the French president. Sadler's Wells Ballet billed the performance as The Sleeping Princess.

=== 1940s ===
Year	Title	Version	Role	Notes
1940	The Sleeping Beauty	by Tchaikovsky	Aurora	Sadler's Wells Ballet billed the performance as The Sleeping Princess.
1940	Dante Sonata	choreography Frederick Ashton, music by Franz Liszt	leader of the Children of Light	Fonteyn was the first to dance the role in the ballet's debut performance.
1940	The Wise Virgins	choreography by Frederick Ashton, music by Johann Sebastian Bach	Bride	Fonteyn was the first to dance the role in the ballet's debut performance.
1941	The Wanderer	choreography by Frederick Ashton, music by Franz Schubert	Success	Fonteyn was the first to dance the role in the ballet's debut performance.
1941	Orpheus and Eurydice	choreography by Ninette de Valois, music by Christoph Willibald Gluck	Love	Fonteyn was the first to dance the role in the ballet's debut performance.
1941	The Sleeping Beauty	by Tchaikovsky	Aurora	Sadler's Wells Ballet billed the performance as The Sleeping Princess.
1942	Comus	choreography by Robert Helpmann, music by Henry Purcell / arranged by Constant Lambert	Lady	Helpmann's first ballet and Fonteyn created the role of "Lady" in the ballet's debut.
1942	Hamlet	choreography by Robert Helpmann, music by Tchaikovsky	Ophelia	Helpmann's second ballet in which Fonteyn created the role at its world premier.
1942	The Rake's Progress	choreography by Ninette de Valois, music by Gavin Gordon	Betrayed Girl	
1943	Coppélia	choreography Marius Petipa (as revised by Enrico Cecchetti, Lev Ivanov, and Nicholas Sergeyev), music by Léo Delibes	Swanilda	
1943	The Quest	choreography by Frederick Ashton, music by William Walton	Una	Fonteyn was the first to dance the role in the ballet's debut performance.
1943	Swan Lake	by Tchaikovsky	Odette-Odile	Sadler's Wells billed the ballet as Le Lac des cygnes.
1944	Le Spectre de la rose	choreography Michel Fokine, music by Carl Maria von Weber	female role, pas de deux	
1944	Carnaval	choreography by Michel Fokine, music by Robert Schumann	Columbine	Following this performance, the company spent the next year traveling with the Entertainments National Service Association (ENSA) performing in Belgium and France.
1946	The Sleeping Beauty	by Tchaikovsky	Aurora	Reopening performance of the Royal Opera House after the end of World War II.
1946	Nocturne	choreography by Frederick Ashton, music by Frederick Delius	Flower girl	The ballet was performed on 18 March, 10 April, 15 May and 19 November 1946.
1946	The Rake's Progress	choreography by Ninette de Valois, music by Gavin Gordon	Betrayed Girl	
1946	Dante Sonata	choreography Frederick Ashton, music by Franz Liszt	leader of the Children of Light	
1946	Symphonic Variations	choreography by Frederick Ashton, music by César Franck	female lead	The ballet was performed on 24 April (world premier), 3 June and 30 October 1946.
1946	Les Sylphides	choreography Michel Fokine, music by Frédéric Chopin	Mazurka, Nocturne and pas de deux with Alexis Rassine	
1946	Hamlet	choreography by Robert Helpmann, music by Tchaikovsky	Ophelia	Performances occurred on 3 June, 29 October, 30 October and 12 November 1946
1946	Giselle	choreography Jean Coralli, Jules Perrot, as revised by Marius Petipa; music by Adolphe Adam	Giselle	The ballet was performed on 12 June, 7 November and 18 November 1946.
1946	Coppélia	choreography Marius Petipa (as revised by Enrico Cecchetti, Lev Ivanov, and Nicholas Sergeyev), music by Léo Delibes	Swanilda	
1946	Les Sirènes	choreography Frederick Ashton, music by Lord Berners	La Bolero	Fonteyn was the first to dance the role in the ballet's debut performance.
1946	The Fairy Queen	choreography by Frederick Ashton, music by Henry Purcell	Spirit of the Air	
1946	Swan Lake	by Tchaikovsky	Odette-Odile	
1947	The Three-Cornered Hat	choreography by Léonide Massine, music by Manuel de Falla	Miller's Wife	The ballet was performed on 6 February, 8 February, 20 December and 22 December 1947.
1947	Dante Sonata	choreography Frederick Ashton, music by Franz Liszt	leader of the Children of Light	Performances occurred on 8 February and 22 December 1947.
1947	Giselle	choreography Jean Coralli, Jules Perrot, as revised by Marius Petipa; music by Adolphe Adam	Giselle	
1947	Swan Lake, Act II	by Tchaikovsky	Odette	
1947	Hamlet	choreography by Robert Helpmann, music by Tchaikovsky	Ophelia	The ballet was performed on 27 February, 14 November, 15 November, and 18 November 1947.
1947	Mam'zelle Angot	choreography by Léonide Massine, music by Charles Lecocq / arranged by Gordon Jacob	Mam'zelle Angot	The Royal Opera House debut of the work premiered on 26 November, with a subsequent performance by Fonteyn on 8 December 1947
1947	Symphonic Variations	choreography by Frederick Ashton, music by César Franck	female lead	
1948	Scènes de ballet	choreography by Frederick Ashton, music by Igor Stravinsky	female lead	
1948	Swan Lake	by Tchaikovsky	Odette-Odile	
1948	Les Demoiselles de la Nuit	choreography Roland Petit, music by Jean Françaix	Agathe	The role was created by Petit for Fonteyn
1948	Don Juan	choreography Frederick Ashton, music by Richard Strauss	La Morte Amoureuse	The premier performance of the ballet in which Fonteyn danced occurred on 25 November, but she injured herself during the performance and could not dance for several months afterward.
1949	Cinderella	choreography by Frederick Ashton, music by Sergei Prokofiev	Cinderella	Fonteyn opened in Cinderella on 25 February and after completing touring, resumed the role for the 26 December 1949 performance.
1949	Symphonic Variations	choreography by Frederick Ashton, music by César Franck	female lead	Fonteyn played the role on 9 March and 1 August 1949
1949	Symphonic Variations	choreography by Frederick Ashton, music by César Franck	female lead	In May 1949, the company participated in the May Festival at the Teatro Communale in Florence, Italy. Among the repertoire presented were Checkmate, Cinderella, Hamlet, Symphonic Variations and The Rake's Progress.
1949	Swan Lake	by Tchaikovsky	Odette-Odile	After the performance in Italy, Fonteyn and Helpmann appeared in Copenhagen at a Gala event attended by Frederik IX of Denmark.
1949	The Sleeping Beauty	by Tchaikovsky	Aurora	From October to December 1949 the company was touring the United States. After the premier on 9 October, the ballet toured Washington, D. C.; Richmond, Virginia; Philadelphia, Pennsylvania; Chicago, Illinois; East Lansing, Michigan; and Toronto, Ontario, Canada.

=== 1950s ===
Year	Title	Version	Role	Notes
1950	The Sleeping Beauty	by Tchaikovsky	Aurora	
1950	Don Quixote	choreography Ninette de Valois, music by Roberto Gerhard	Lady Dulcinea-Aldonza Lorenzo	Fonteyn was the first to dance the dual role in the ballet's debut performance on 20 February 1950. She subsequently danced the role on 4 March and 13 March 1950.
1950	Giselle	choreography Jean Coralli, Jules Perrot, as revised by Marius Petipa; music by Adolphe Adam	Giselle	
1950	Symphonic Variations	choreography by Frederick Ashton, music by César Franck	female lead	Gala performance on 9 March in honor of French President Vincent Auriol.
1950	The Sleeping Beauty, Act III	by Tchaikovsky	Aurora	Gala performance on 9 March in honor of French President Vincent Auriol.
1950	Swan Lake	by Tchaikovsky	Odette-Odile	
1950	Ballet Imperial	choreography by George Balanchine, music by Tchaikovsky	lead female	Premier performance of the ballet with the Royal Ballet Company was on 5 April 1950. Fonteyn subsequently performed the role on 25 May and 30 May 1950.
1950	The Sleeping Beauty	by Tchaikovsky	Aurora	Partnered with Helpmann, the pair danced at La Scala in Milan, Italy on 24 April.
1950	The Haunted Ballroom	choreography by Ninette de Valois, music by Geoffrey Toye	Young Tregennis	Role reprised for the 20th anniversary of the company.
1950	L'Ile des Sirènes	choreography by Alfred Rodrigues, music by Claude Debussy	female lead	Fonteyn played this role in a provincial tour.
1950	Swan Lake	by Tchaikovsky	Odette-Odile	Second U.S. tour began in September 1950 and opened with a pax de deux by Fonteyn and Michael Somes in New York City.
1950	The Sleeping Beauty	by Tchaikovsky	Aurora	Partnered with Helpmann the duo performed in San Francisco, California on 11 November.
1951	The Sleeping Beauty	by Tchaikovsky	Aurora	Opened the season on 21 February. Besides the opening night, Fonteyn danced the role on 24 February, 1 March, 3 March, 6 March, 8 March and 10 March 1951.
1951	Cinderella	choreography by Frederick Ashton, music by Sergei Prokofiev	Cinderella	Fonteyn danced the season opener on 12 March 1951 and subsequent performances on 14 March, 17 March and 21 March 1951.
1951	Swan Lake	by Tchaikovsky	Odette-Odile	Fonteyn first danced the dual role 26 March 1951 for the season and repeated the performance on 28 March, 31 March, 23 April, 25 April, and 12 May 1951.
1951	Daphnis and Chloe	choreography Frederick Ashton, with music by Maurice Ravel	Chloë	Fonteyn danced in the world premier on 5 April 1951. She subsequently performed the role on 6 April, 7 April, 9 April, 10 April, 11 April, 16 April, 18 April, 28 April, 3 May, 8 May, 9 May, 4 July, 6 July, 12 July, 13 July, and 14 July 1951.
1951	Symphonic Variations	choreography by Frederick Ashton, music by César Franck	female lead	In the 1951 season, Fonteyn first danced the role on 28 April and also performed it on 2 May, 11 May, and 3 July 1951.
1951	Tiresias	choreography by Frederick Ashton, music by Constant Lambert	female Tiresias	Fonteyn danced in the world premier on 9 July 1951. She subsequently performed the role on 10 July, 11 July and each day from 16 to 20 July 1951. After this performance, she injured her foot and was unable to dance for several months.
1952	Daphnis and Chloe	choreography Frederick Ashton, with music by Maurice Ravel	Chloë	Her first performance after the injury was on 9 February 1952.
1952	Swan Lake	by Tchaikovsky	Odette-Odile	Performed at the San Carlos Theatre in Lisbon, Portugal from 15 to 23 April 1952. After the performance in Lisbon, the company performed in Porto, Portugal.
1952	Sylvia	choreography by Frederick Ashton, music by Léo Delibes	Sylvia	Fonteyn danced in the world premier on 3 September 1952.
1952	Giselle	choreography Jean Coralli, Jules Perrot, as revised by Marius Petipa; music by Adolphe Adam	Giselle	Danced with Somes in Berlin at the Berlin Festival on 29 September. Beginning a provincial tour throughout England, after Berlin, she contracted diphtheria in Southampton and was unable to dance for five months.
1953	Apparitions	choreography Frederick Ashton, music by Franz Liszt / arranged by Constant Lambert	Woman in the ball gown	After her performance, Fonteyn, gave a rare curtain speech. Because she had been ill, she performed one-act ballets through much of the first half of the 1953 season.
1953	Swan Lake, Act II	by Tchaikovsky	Odette	Fonteyn appeared on 30 March and 2 June 1953.
1953	Tiresias	choreography by Frederick Ashton, music by Constant Lambert	female Tiresias	Fonteyn danced on 17 April and 1 September 1953.
1953	Homage to the Queen	choreography Frederick Ashton, music by Malcolm Arnold	Queen of the Air	World premier in honor of Queen Elizabeth II's coronation, danced 2 June 1953.
1953	Cinderella	choreography by Frederick Ashton, music by Sergei Prokofiev	Cinderella	
1953	Sylvia, Act III	choreography by Frederick Ashton, music by Léo Delibes	Sylvia	
1953	Swan Lake	by Tchaikovsky	Odette-Odile	Third U.S. tour began with a performance in New York City on 13 September. The tour lasted 19 weeks and included 4 Canadian cities and 20 cities in the U.S.
1953	The Sleeping Beauty	by Tchaikovsky	Aurora	Performed in New York City on 16 September.
1954	The Sleeping Beauty	by Tchaikovsky	Aurora	
1954	Daphnis and Chloe	choreography Frederick Ashton, with music by Maurice Ravel	Chloë	For the 1954 season, Fonteyn danced the role on 9 March and 14 September.
1954	Homage to the Queen	choreography Frederick Ashton, music by Malcolm Arnold	Queen of the Air	Fonteyn danced the role on 9 March, 26 March, 21 April, and 3 September 1954.
1954	Swan Lake	by Tchaikovsky	Odette-Odile	
1954	Sylvia	choreography by Frederick Ashton, music by Léo Delibes	Sylvia	
1954	Giselle	choreography Jean Coralli, Jules Perrot, as revised by Marius Petipa; music by Adolphe Adam	Giselle	
1954	Symphonic Variations	choreography by Frederick Ashton, music by César Franck	female lead	
1954	Swan Lake	by Tchaikovsky	Odette-Odile	Somes and Fonteyn danced in June at the Yugoslav National Ballet in Belgrade.
1954	Entrada de Madame Butterfly	choreography Frederick Ashton, music Arthur Sullivan / arranged by Robert Irving	Madame Butterfly	Costumes were designed by Christian Dior. The ballet was debuted in Granada, Spain at the Jardines del Generalife.
1954	The Firebird	choreography by Michel Fokine, music by Igor Stravinsky	The Firebird	Fonteyn was taught the role by Tamara Karsavina and danced with Somes. The first performance was held in Edinburgh at the Empire Theatre on 23 August. Fonteyn repeated the role on 28 August, 31 August, 14 September and 16 December 1954.
1955	The Firebird	choreography by Michel Fokine, music by Igor Stravinsky	The Firebird	Performed by Fonteyn on 20 January and 22 March 1955.
1955	Daphnis and Chloe	choreography Frederick Ashton, with music by Maurice Ravel	Chloë	Performed in Paris with Somes the night before her wedding on 5 February 1955.
1955	Symphonic Variations	choreography by Frederick Ashton, music by César Franck	female lead	Fonteyn danced on 19 March and 31 August 1955. The first performance was her first performance after her marriage to Roberto Arias.
1955	Sylvia	choreography by Frederick Ashton, music by Léo Delibes	Sylvia	Fonteyn danced the role on 12 April and 23 August 1955.
1955	Les Sylphides	choreography Michel Fokine, music by Frédéric Chopin	Mazurka, Nocturne and pas de deux with Alexis Rassine	Fonteyn's performances were on 3 June and 25 August 1955.
1955	The Firebird	choreography by Michel Fokine, music by Igor Stravinsky	The Firebird	Performed by Fonteyn and Somes on Christmas Day at La Scala in Milan.
1955	Daphnis and Chloe	choreography Frederick Ashton, with music by Maurice Ravel	Chloë	New Year's Eve performance.
1956	Swan Lake	by Tchaikovsky	Odette-Odile	After the performance on 2 January 1956, Fonteyn received notification of her appointment a Dame in the Order of the British Empire.
1956	Cinderella	choreography by Frederick Ashton, music by Sergei Prokofiev	Cinderella	Fonteyn performed the role on 7 January and 21 November 1956.
1956	La Péri	choreography Frederick Ashton, music by Paul Dukas	female lead	Fonteyn was the first to dance the role in the ballet's debut performance on 15 February 1956.
1956	The Sleeping Beauty	by Tchaikovsky	Aurora	Fonteyn performed the role on 20 February and 21 December 1956.
1956	The Firebird	choreography by Michel Fokine, music by Igor Stravinsky	The Firebird	
1956	Entrée japonaise	choreography Frederick Ashton, music Arthur Sullivan / arranged by Robert Irving	Madame Butterfly	Costumes were designed by Christian Dior. The ballet was previously known as Entrada de Madame Butterfly.
1956	Swan Lake	by Tchaikovsky	Odette-Odile	Performed by Fonteyn and Somes in Helsinki with the Finnish National Ballet on 15 April 1956.
1956	The Sleeping Beauty	by Tchaikovsky	Aurora	Performed by Fonteyn in Helsinki with the Finnish National Ballet on 12 April 1956.
1956	Swan Lake, Act II	by Tchaikovsky	Odette-Odile	Performed by Fonteyn and Somes as guest dancers at the wedding of Grace Kelly and Prince Rainier III in Monte Carlo, Monaco.
1956	Façade	choreography Frederick Ashton, music by William Walton	Tango dancer	Performed with Robert Helpmann in celebration of the 25th anniversary of the Sadler's Wells Ballet Company, 5 May 1956.
1956	Birthday Offering	choreography by Frederick Ashton, music by Alexander Glazunov / arranged by Robert Irving	female lead	Fonteyn danced in the world premier of the ballet written to commemorate the 25th anniversary of the Sadler's Wells Ballet Company. Subsequently, she danced the role on 7 September and 29 September 1956.
1956	Swan Lake	by Tchaikovsky	Odette-Odile	
1956	Swan Lake	by Tchaikovsky	Odette-Odile	Performed in Johannesburg, South Africa at Zoo Lake.
1956	Sylvia	choreography by Frederick Ashton, music by Léo Delibes	Sylvia	
1957	Daphnis and Chloe	choreography Frederick Ashton, with music by Maurice Ravel	Chloë	Fonteyn's first performance after the company receives a royal charter to become the Royal Ballet. Fonteyn performs the role on 12 March and 10 April 1957.
1957	Petrushka	choreography by Michel Fokine, music by Igor Stravinsky	Doll Ballerina	Fonteyn dances in the company premier of the ballet on 26 March 1957 and repeats the performance two days later.
1957	Swan Lake	by Tchaikovsky	Odette-Odile	Performed at The Empire Theatre in Sydney, Australia in May 1957, where she danced for two weeks performing in every show.
1957	La Péri	choreography Frederick Ashton, music by Paul Dukas	female lead	After the August performance, Fonteyn embarked on a 5-month international tour.
1958	Sylvia	choreography by Frederick Ashton, music by Léo Delibes	Sylvia	
1958	La Péri	choreography Frederick Ashton, music by Paul Dukas	female lead	Fonteyn danced the role on 22 February, 6 March, and 27 March 1958.
1958	Daphnis and Chloe	choreography Frederick Ashton, with music by Maurice Ravel	Chloë	Fonteyn's performances were on 6 March, 14 March, and 20 August 1958.
1958	The Sleeping Beauty	by Tchaikovsky	Aurora	Fonteyn danced the role for the 1958 season on 10 March and subsequently performed it on 18 August 1958.
1958	Swan Lake	by Tchaikovsky	Odette-Odile	Fonteyn's performances occurred on 17 March and 15 December 1958.
1958	The Nutcracker, Act III	choreography by Marius Petipa, music by Tchaikovsky	female lead	Pax de duex performed with Michael Somes for the Royal Ballet Gala on 27 March 1958.
1958	Homage to the Queen	choreography Frederick Ashton, music by Malcolm Arnold	Queen of the Air	
1958	Les Sylphides	choreography Michel Fokine, music by Frédéric Chopin	Mazurka, Nocturne and pas de deux with David Blair	Blair and Fonteyn danced on 8 May and 3 June 1958.
1958	Birthday Offering	choreography by Frederick Ashton, music by Alexander Glazunov / arranged by Robert Irving	female lead	
1958	Ondine	choreography Frederick Ashton, with music by Hans Werner Henze	Ondine	The world premier of the ballet occurred on 27 October 1958 with Fonteyn creating the title role. Subsequently, she performed it on 30 October, 1 November, 5 November, 7 November, 11 November, 25 November, 6 December, 9 December, 17 December, and 31 December 1958.
1958	Cinderella	choreography by Frederick Ashton, music by Sergei Prokofiev	Cinderella	
1959	Ondine	choreography Frederick Ashton, with music by Hans Werner Henze	Ondine	Fonteyn performed the role on 24 January, 26 January, 3 February, 9 February, 11 February, 14 February, 4 September, 5 September, 10 September, 10 September, 7 November, 19 November, 30 November, 3 December, 12 December, and 18 December 1959.
1959	Symphonic Variations	choreography by Frederick Ashton, music by César Franck	female lead	Fonteyn danced the role on 5 June and 21 November 1959.
1959	Daphnis and Chloe	choreography Frederick Ashton, with music by Maurice Ravel	Chloë	On 5 June and 21 November 1959 Fonteyn danced the role.
1959	Cinderella	choreography by Frederick Ashton, music by Sergei Prokofiev	Cinderella	

=== 1960s ===
Year	Title	Version	Role	Notes
1960	Ondine	choreography Frederick Ashton, with music by Hans Werner Henze	Ondine	Fonteyn performed the role on 5 January, 18 January, 26 January, 1 February, 14 March, 19 March, 2 April, 6 April, 25 April, 9 May 1960.
1960	Giselle	choreography Jean Coralli, Jules Perrot, as revised by Marius Petipa; music by Adolphe Adam	Giselle	
1960	Raymonda 'Scène d'amour'	choreography Frederick Ashton, music by Alexander Glazunov	Raymonda	Fonteyn and Somes danced at the first performance of the ballet at the Royal Opera House on 1 March 1960.
1960	Les Sylphides	choreography Michel Fokine, music by Frédéric Chopin	Mazurka, Nocturne and pas de deux with David Blair	Blair and Fonteyn danced on 15 August and 17 August 1960.
1960	Birthday Offering	choreography by Frederick Ashton, music by Alexander Glazunov / arranged by Robert Irving	female lead	Fonteyn performed on 15 August and 17 August 1960.
1960	Cinderella	choreography by Frederick Ashton, music by Sergei Prokofiev	Cinderella	
1961	Ondine	choreography Frederick Ashton, with music by Hans Werner Henze	Ondine	Fonteyn performed the role on 2 March, 10 March, 16 March, 24 March, 3 October 1961.
1961	Giselle	choreography Jean Coralli, Jules Perrot, as revised by Marius Petipa; music by Adolphe Adam	Giselle	On 4 April and 23 September 1961, Fonteyn danced the role.
1961	Symphonic Variations	choreography by Frederick Ashton, music by César Franck	female lead	
1961	Daphnis and Chloe	choreography Frederick Ashton, with music by Maurice Ravel	Chloë	
1961	The Sleeping Beauty	by Tchaikovsky	Aurora	Fonteyn danced the role for the 1958 season on 8 November and subsequently performed it on 27 November, 1 December, 9 December, 18 December 1961.
1962	Cinderella	choreography by Frederick Ashton, music by Sergei Prokofiev	Cinderella	
1962	The Firebird	choreography by Michel Fokine, music by Igor Stravinsky	The Firebird	Fonteyn's performances occurred on 1 February, 13 February, 26 February 1962.
1962	Swan Lake	by Tchaikovsky	Odette-Odile	
1962	Giselle	choreography Jean Coralli, Jules Perrot, as revised by Marius Petipa; music by Adolphe Adam	Giselle	The debut of the legendary partnership with Rudolf Nureyev occurred on 21 February and subsequently Fonteyn danced the role on 1 March, 6 March, 15 June, 29 June 1962.
1962	The Sleeping Beauty	by Tchaikovsky	Aurora	After this 23 March 1962 performance, Fonteyn went on tour in Australia.
1962	Le Spectre de la rose	choreography Michel Fokine, music by Carl Maria von Weber	female role, pas de deux	Fonteyn danced with Brian Shaw during the Australian tour.
1962	Symphonic Variations	choreography by Frederick Ashton, music by César Franck	female lead	Fonteyn performed in May during the Australian tour.
1962	Birthday Offering	choreography by Frederick Ashton, music by Alexander Glazunov / arranged by Robert Irving	female lead	Fonteyn performed the dance during the May 1962 Australian tour.
1962	Swan Lake	by Tchaikovsky	Odette-Odile	Swan Lake pas de deux with David Blair in Australia.
1962	The Sleeping Beauty	by Tchaikovsky	Aurora	Fonteyn was partnered with David Blair during the May Australian tour.
1962	Daphnis and Chloe	choreography Frederick Ashton, with music by Maurice Ravel	Chloë	Fonteyn performed the role on 3 November, 5 November, 6 November, 16 November 1962.
1962	Le Corsaire Pas de Deux	choreography Marius Petipa, music by Adolphe Adam revised by Cesare Pugni, Léo Delibes, Riccardo Drigo and Petr Oldenbourg	female dancer	The dance was first performed at the Royal Opera House by Fonteyn and Nureyev on 3 November and subsequently performed by the duo on 5 November and 16 November 1962.
1962	Les Sylphides	choreography Michel Fokine, music by Frédéric Chopin	Nocturne, Prelude and pas de deux with Nureyev	
1962	Ondine	choreography Frederick Ashton, with music by Hans Werner Henze	Ondine	
1963	Le Corsaire Pas de Deux	choreography Marius Petipa, music by Adolphe Adam revised by Cesare Pugni, Léo Delibes, Riccardo Drigo and Petr Oldenbourg	female dancer	Fonteyn performed the female part on 31 January, 16 March, 22 March, 28 March, 3 April 1963.
1963	Les Sylphides	choreography Michel Fokine, music by Frédéric Chopin	Nocturne, Prelude and pas de deux with Nureyev	Fonteyn danced the role on 31 January and subsequently repeated the performance on 16 March and 22 March 1963.
1963	Swan Lake	choreography Rudolph Nureyev, music by Tchaikovsky, arranged by John Lanchbery	Odette-Odile	The original production was performed in the first part of the season. Nureyev's revised choreography was danced from 12 December 1963 to the end of the season. Fonteyn's performances occurred on 7 February, 12 February, 12 December, 14 December, 30 December 1963.
1963	Giselle	choreography Jean Coralli, Jules Perrot, as revised by Marius Petipa; music by Adolphe Adam	Giselle	Fonteyn danced the role on 20 February, 26 February, 2 November, 15 November 1963.
1963	Marguerite and Armand	choreography Frederick Ashton, music by Franz Liszt	Marguerite	The world premier of the ballet, written for Fonteyn and Nureyev occurred on 12 March. Subsequently, they performed it on 15 March, 19 March, 21 March, 20 November, 22 November, 25 November 1963.
1963	Symphonic Variations	choreography by Frederick Ashton, music by César Franck	female lead	Fonteyn danced the lead on 30 March and 1 April 1963.
1963	The Sleeping Beauty	by Tchaikovsky	Aurora	Fonteyn danced the pax de deux with David Blair on opening night of the U.S. tour in April 1963 at the Metropolitan Opera House in New York City.
1963	Giselle	choreography Jean Coralli, Jules Perrot, as revised by Marius Petipa; music by Adolphe Adam	Giselle	Fonteyn and Nureyev premiered on 25 April 1963 at the Metropolitan Opera House in New York City.
1963	Swan Lake	choreography Rudolph Nureyev, music by Tchaikovsky, arranged by John Lanchbery	Odette-Odile	Fonteyn and Nureyev danced on 29 April 1963 at the Metropolitan Opera House in New York City.
1963	Le Corsaire Pas de Deux	choreography Marius Petipa, music by Adolphe Adam revised by Cesare Pugni, Léo Delibes, Riccardo Drigo and Petr Oldenbourg	female dancer	Fonteyn and Nureyev danced in April 1963 during the U.S. tour in New York City at the Metropolitan Opera House. After New York, they went on to play in Toronto.
1963	Giselle	choreography Jean Coralli, Jules Perrot, as revised by Marius Petipa; music by Adolphe Adam	Giselle	Fonteyn danced with Nureyev in July 1963 in Los Angeles, California.
1963	Marguerite and Armand	choreography Frederick Ashton, music by Franz Liszt	Marguerite	The U.S. tour ended in Los Angeles with Fonteyn and Nureyev performing in July 1963. After the U.S. tour the Fonteyn Follies, including Nureyev, Erik Bruhn and Carla Fracci, among others, toured Athens, Nice, Tele Aviv, Haifa, Jerusalem, Nagoya, Kyoto, Osaka and Honolulu, before returning to England.
1963	La Bayadère	choreography Marius Petipa, revised by Rudolf Nureyev; music by Leon Minkus	Nikiya	The world premier of this version as revised by Nureyev was performed on 27 November and the duo repeated their dance on 30 November, 6 December, 7 December 1963.
1964	Swan Lake	choreography Rudolph Nureyev, music by Tchaikovsky, arranged by John Lanchbery	Odette-Odile	Fonteyn performed the role on 3 January, 3 March, 6 March, 10 March, 12 March, 19 March, 5 November, 11 November 1964.
1964	Ondine	choreography Frederick Ashton, with music by Hans Werner Henze	Ondine	Valentine's Day performance.
1964	Marguerite and Armand	choreography Frederick Ashton, music by Franz Liszt	Marguerite	Fonteyn and Nureyev performed the ballet on 14 March and 17 March 1964. They also danced it several times in June, after she returned from Panama.
1964	La Bayadère	choreography Marius Petipa, revised by Rudolf Nureyev; music by Leon Minkus	Nikiya	Fonteyn danced the role on 8 April and subsequently performed it in June and then on 3 December and 5 December 1964.
1964	Giselle	choreography Jean Coralli, Jules Perrot, as revised by Marius Petipa; music by Adolphe Adam	Giselle	Fonteyn performed the role with Nureyev on tour Sydney with The Australian Ballet in April 1964 and they danced in Melbourne in May.
1964	Swan Lake	choreography Rudolph Nureyev, music by Tchaikovsky, arranged by John Lanchbery	Odette-Odile	Fonteyn performed the role with Nureyev on tour in Sydney with The Australian Ballet in April 1964 and in Melbourne in May. From Australia, the tour continued in Stuttgart.
1964	Divertimento	choreography Sir Kenneth MacMillan, music by Béla Bartók	female dancer	MacMillian created the ballet for Fonteyn and Nureyev. They danced in the premier at the Bath Festival and then flew to Panama because her husband had been injured in an assassination attempt.
1964	Giselle	choreography Jean Coralli, Jules Perrot, as revised by Marius Petipa; music by Adolphe Adam	Giselle	Fonteyn's performances in the role occurred in June and she repeated the dance on 23 October, 28 October, 27 November 1964.
1964	Raymonda	choreography Marius Petipa, revised by Rudolf Nureyev; music by Alexander Glazunov	Raymonda	Due to her husband's relapse, though Fonteyn had trained for the role, she missed all the July performances at the Festival dei Due Mondi except the final performance.
1964	Swan Lake	choreography Rudolph Nureyev, music by Tchaikovsky, arranged by John Lanchbery	Odette-Odile	Fonteyn and Nureyev opened at the Vienna State Opera House on 15 October with his version of the ballet receiving a record-breaking eighty-nine curtain calls.
1964	Daphnis and Chloe	choreography Frederick Ashton, with music by Maurice Ravel	Chloë	Fonteyn danced the role on 24 November, 25 November, 30 November, and 15 December 1964.
1964	Le Corsaire Pas de Deux	choreography Marius Petipa, music by Adolphe Adam revised by Cesare Pugni, Léo Delibes, Riccardo Drigo and Petr Oldenbourg	female dancer	Fonteyn's performances were on 24 November, 25 November, 30 November 1964.
1964	The Sleeping Beauty	by Tchaikovsky	Aurora	
1965	The Sleeping Beauty	by Tchaikovsky	Aurora	
1965	Marguerite and Armand	choreography Frederick Ashton, music by Franz Liszt	Marguerite	Fonteyn and Nureyev performed the ballet on 12 January, 14 January, 15 January, 20 March, 22 March 1965.
1965	Le Corsaire Pas de Deux	choreography Marius Petipa, music by Adolphe Adam revised by Cesare Pugni, Léo Delibes, Riccardo Drigo and Petr Oldenbourg	female dancer	Fonteyn and Nureyev performed on 20 January 1965 at the presidential inauguration of Lyndon B. Johnson at the National Mall in Washington, D. C.
1965	Swan Lake	choreography Rudolph Nureyev, music by Tchaikovsky, arranged by John Lanchbery	Odette-Odile	
1965	La Bayadère	choreography Marius Petipa, revised by Rudolf Nureyev; music by Leon Minkus	Nikiya	Fonteyn danced the role on 4 February, 10 March, 12 March 1965.
1965	Romeo and Juliet	choreography by Kenneth MacMillan, music by Sergei Prokofiev	Juliet	Fonteyn and Nureyev danced in the world premier of the ballet on 9 February 1965 at the insistence of the Royal Opera management. MacMillan had actually written the part with Lynn Seymour and Christopher Gable slated as the leads. Fonteyn and Nureyev subsequently danced the roles on 9 February, 11 February, 25 February, 5 March 1965.
1965	Birthday Offering	choreography by Frederick Ashton, music by Alexander Glazunov / arranged by Robert Irving	female lead	
1965	Romeo and Juliet	choreography by Kenneth MacMillan, music by Sergei Prokofiev	Juliet	Fonteyn and Nureyev first performed the ballet in New York City on 21 April 1965.
1965	Giselle	choreography Jean Coralli, Jules Perrot, as revised by Marius Petipa; music by Adolphe Adam	Giselle	During the three-month U.S. tour, Fonteyn and Nureyev danced the ballet in Washington, D. C. at the Coliseum.
1965	Sylvia	choreography by Frederick Ashton, music by Léo Delibes	Sylvia	
1965	Raymonda	choreography Marius Petipa, revised by Rudolf Nureyev; music by Alexander Glazunov	Raymonda	In November 1965, Fonteyn and Nureyev toured with The Australian Ballet for eight weeks going from Birmingham to London, Paris, Copenhagen, Los Angeles and Honolulu.
1965	Cinderella	choreography by Frederick Ashton, music by Sergei Prokofiev	Cinderella	
1966	Giselle	choreography Jean Coralli, Jules Perrot, as revised by Marius Petipa; music by Adolphe Adam	Giselle	Fonteyn performed the role on 13 January, 18 January, 27 January, 28 February, 3 March, and 23 December 1966.
1966	Swan Lake	choreography Rudolph Nureyev, music by Tchaikovsky, arranged by John Lanchbery	Odette-Odile	Fonteyn danced the role on 3 February and subsequently performed it on 8 February, 14 February, 16 March, and 18 March 1966.
1966	Romeo and Juliet	choreography by Kenneth MacMillan, music by Sergei Prokofiev	Juliet	The role was performed by Fonteyn on 22 February, 9 March, 12 March, 6 June, 7 June 1966.
1966	Raymonda, Act III	choreography Marius Petipa, revised by Rudolf Nureyev; music by Alexander Glazunov	Raymonda	
1966	Daphnis and Chloe	choreography Frederick Ashton, with music by Maurice Ravel	Chloë	Fonteyn performed the role on 25 June, 28 June, 29 June, 1 July 1966.
1966	Romeo and Juliet	choreography by Kenneth MacMillan, music by Sergei Prokofiev	Juliet	During the summer break at the Royal Opera House, Fonteyn and Nureyev performed in Monaco at the Royal Palace, afterward dining with the royal couple, Princess Grace and Prince Rainier. The company moved on from Monaco to performances in Greece.
1966	Ondine	choreography Frederick Ashton, with music by Hans Werner Henze	Ondine	
1966	Cinderella	choreography by Frederick Ashton, music by Sergei Prokofiev	Cinderella	
1967	Giselle	choreography Jean Coralli, Jules Perrot, as revised by Marius Petipa; music by Adolphe Adam	Giselle	Fonteyn performed the role on 10 January and 17 January 1967.
1967	La Bayadère	choreography Marius Petipa, revised by Rudolf Nureyev; music by Leon Minkus	Nikiya	Fonteyn danced on 25 January and 26 January 1967.
1967	Giselle	choreography Jean Coralli, Jules Perrot, as revised by Marius Petipa; music by Adolphe Adam	Giselle	
1967	Romeo and Juliet	choreography by Kenneth MacMillan, music by Sergei Prokofiev	Juliet	Performed by Fonteyn on 11 February and 14 February 1967.
1967	Paradise Lost	choreography by Roland Petit, music by Marius Constant	The Woman (Eve)	Fonteyn and Nureyev danced as leads in the world premier of the avant-garde ballet on 23 February 1967. The ballet, about the fall of man, was based on a work by French poet, Jean Cau and featured modern dance, pop art and neon lighting. The duo subsequently performed the roles on 7 March, 10 March, 16 March, 21 March, and 8 April 1967.
1967	Swan Lake	choreography Rudolph Nureyev, music by Tchaikovsky, arranged by John Lanchbery	Odette-Odile	Fonteyn's performances were on 4 March and 15 March 1967.
1967	Marguerite and Armand	choreography Frederick Ashton, music by Franz Liszt	Marguerite	Fonteyn and Nureyev performed on 25 March, 27 March, 29 March, and 30 March 1967.
1967	Romeo and Juliet	choreography by Kenneth MacMillan, music by Sergei Prokofiev	Juliet	Danced by Fonteyn and Nureyev in May 1967 at the Metropolitan Opera House in New York City.
1967	Giselle	choreography Jean Coralli, Jules Perrot, as revised by Marius Petipa; music by Adolphe Adam	Giselle	Fonteyn and Nureyev performed the dance during the US tour in May 1967 in New York City.
1967	Swan Lake	choreography Rudolph Nureyev, music by Tchaikovsky, arranged by John Lanchbery	Odette-Odile	Fonteyn and Nureyev ended the New York City performance on Fonteyn's 48th birthday with the ballet, which received an ovation that lasted over forty minutes.
1967	Paradise Lost	choreography by Roland Petit, music by Marius Constant	The Woman (Eve)	In July 1967, Fonteyn and Nureyev performed the ballet in San Francisco during their U.S. tour. They also subsequently danced the ballet in Los Angeles at the Hollywood Bowl.
1967	Romeo and Juliet	choreography by Kenneth MacMillan, music by Sergei Prokofiev	Juliet	Performed by Fonteyn and Nureyev at the Hollywood Bowl in Los Angeles in July 1967.
1967	Paradise Lost	choreography by Roland Petit, music by Marius Constant	The Woman (Eve)	Fonteyn and Nureyev danced the ballet at the Paris Opera in October 1967.
1968	Giselle	choreography Jean Coralli, Jules Perrot, as revised by Marius Petipa; music by Adolphe Adam	Giselle	
1968	Swan Lake	choreography Rudolph Nureyev, music by Tchaikovsky, arranged by John Lanchbery	Fonteyn's appearances occurred on 12 February, 14 February, 25 March, and 8 April 1968.	
1968	Romeo and Juliet	choreography by Kenneth MacMillan, music by Sergei Prokofiev	Juliet	Fonteyn danced the role on 20 February and 22 February 1968.
1968	Marguerite and Armand	choreography Frederick Ashton, music by Franz Liszt	Marguerite	Fonteyn and Nureyev danced the roles on 15 March, 19 March, and 29 March 1968.
1968	Les Sylphides	choreography Michel Fokine, music by Frédéric Chopin	Nocturne, Prelude and pas de deux with Nureyev	Fonteyn's performances occurred on 15 March, 19 March, 3 April, and 9 April 1968.
1968	Birthday Offering	choreography by Frederick Ashton, music by Alexander Glazunov / arranged by Robert Irving	female lead	Dances by Fonteyn were performed on 29 March, 3 April, and 9 April 1968.
1968	Romeo and Juliet	choreography by Kenneth MacMillan, music by Sergei Prokofiev	Juliet	Fonteyn and Nureyev opened the spring season 1968 in New York City with the ballet.
1968	La Bayadère	choreography Marius Petipa, revised by Rudolf Nureyev; music by Leon Minkus	Nikiya	
1969	Romeo and Juliet	choreography by Kenneth MacMillan, music by Sergei Prokofiev	Juliet	Performed by Fonteyn on 29 January, 5 February, 7 February, 15 February, 20 February, 21 November, 25 November 1969.
1969	Swan Lake	choreography Rudolph Nureyev, music by Tchaikovsky, arranged by John Lanchbery	Odette-Odile	Fonteyn danced on 10 February and subsequently presented the role on 26 February, 27 November, 3 December 1969.
1969	Giselle	choreography Jean Coralli, Jules Perrot, as revised by Marius Petipa; music by Adolphe Adam	Giselle	Fonteyn appeared in the role on 7 March, 10 March, and 15 March 1969.
1969	Pelléas and Mélisande	choreography Roland Petit, music by Arnold Schoenberg	Mélisande	Fonteyn and Nureyev performed in the world premier of the ballet on 26 March 1969. The duo subsequently performed the ballet on 27 March and 29 March 1969.
1969	The Sleeping Beauty	choreography revised by Frederick Ashton, music by Tchaikovsky	Aurora	Performed by Fonteyn on 25 September, 29 September, and 23 October 1969.
1969	La Bayadère	choreography Marius Petipa, revised by Rudolf Nureyev; music by Leon Minkus	Nikiya	Fonteyn danced in performances on 24 October and 25 October 1969.

=== 1970s and 1980s ===
Year	Title	Version	Role	Notes
1970	Giselle	choreography Jean Coralli, Jules Perrot, as revised by Marius Petipa; music by Adolphe Adam	Giselle	Fonteyn performed the role on 8 January, 12 January, 28 February, and 20 June 1970.
1970	Raymonda, Act III	choreography Marius Petipa, revised by Rudolf Nureyev; music by Alexander Glazunov	Raymonda	Fonteyn danced on 16 January and repeated the role on 19 January and 29 January 1970.
1970	Marguerite and Armand	choreography Frederick Ashton, music by Franz Liszt	Marguerite	Fonteyn and Nureyev performed the ballet on 9 February, 17 February, 18 February, 25 February, 22 June, 23 June, 23 July, and 24 July 1970.
1970	Swan Lake	choreography Rudolph Nureyev, music by Tchaikovsky, arranged by John Lanchbery	Odette-Odile	Fonteyn's performances occurred on 14 February, 6 July, and 13 July 1970.
1970	Le Corsaire Pas de Deux	choreography Marius Petipa, music by Adolphe Adam revised by Cesare Pugni, Léo Delibes, Riccardo Drigo and Petr Oldenbourg	female dancer	Fonteyn danced on 17 February, 18 February, and 25 February 1970.
1970	Tribute to Sir Frederick Ashton	varied ballets	various	Fonteyn danced excerpts of The Wise Virgins, Nocturne, Apparitions and Daphnis and Chloe in the tribute held on 24 July 1970.
1970	Romeo and Juliet	choreography by Kenneth MacMillan, music by Sergei Prokofiev	Juliet	Fonteyn performed on 10 December and 12 December 1970.
1970	La Bayadère	choreography Marius Petipa, revised by Rudolf Nureyev; music by Leon Minkus	Nikiya	
1971	La Bayadère	choreography Marius Petipa, revised by Rudolf Nureyev; music by Leon Minkus	Nikiya	Fonteyn performed the role on 13 January and 21 January 1971.
1971	Swan Lake	choreography Rudolph Nureyev, music by Tchaikovsky, arranged by John Lanchbery	Odette-Odile	Fonteyn danced on 1 June and 5 June 1971.
1971	Marguerite and Armand	choreography Frederick Ashton, music by Franz Liszt	Marguerite	Fonteyn and Nureyev danced the role on 23 June and repeated their performance on 25 June, 6 July, 14 July, 16 December, 18 December 1971.
1971	Various		various	Fonteyn and the Australian Ballet performed 'for one fabulous night only' at the Darwin Amphitheatre on 30 October 1971.
1971	Romeo and Juliet	choreography by Kenneth MacMillan, music by Sergei Prokofiev	Juliet	Fonteyn and Nureyev performed an excerpt of the balcony scene on 14 December 1971.
1972	Swan Lake	choreography Rudolph Nureyev, music by Tchaikovsky, arranged by John Lanchbery	Odette-Odile	Fonteyn danced on 6 January and 10 January 1972.
1972	Marguerite and Armand	choreography Frederick Ashton, music by Franz Liszt	Marguerite	
1972	Romeo and Juliet	choreography by Kenneth MacMillan, music by Sergei Prokofiev	Juliet	Fonteyn performed the role on 10 February and subsequently danced on 12 February, 19 July, and 20 July 1972.
1972	Poème de l'extase	choreography by John Cranko, music by Alexander Scriabin	The Diva	Fonteyn appeared in the Royal Opera House debut of the ballet on 15 February 1972 and repeated the performance on 18 February, 21 February, 24 February, 8 April, and 17 April 1972.
1972	The Sleeping Beauty	choreography revised by Frederick Ashton, music by Tchaikovsky	Aurora	Fonteyn's performances occurred on 16 March, 18 March, 22 July, and 24 July 1972.
1972	Raymonda, Act III	choreography Marius Petipa, revised by Rudolf Nureyev; music by Alexander Glazunov	Raymonda	Fonteyn danced the role on 8 April, 17 April, and 9 November 1972.
1972	Birthday Offering	choreography by Frederick Ashton, music by Alexander Glazunov / arranged by Robert Irving	female lead	After the performance on 15 November 1972, Fonteyn went into semi-retirement primarily performing only excerpts of ballets or one-act ballets.
1973	Swan Lake	choreography Rudolph Nureyev, music by Tchaikovsky, arranged by John Lanchbery	Odette-Odile	Fonteyn performed the dual role on 11 January and 17 January 1973.
1973	La Bayadère	choreography Marius Petipa, revised by Rudolf Nureyev; music by Leon Minkus	Nikiya	Fonteyn danced the ballet on 20 January and 23 January 1973.
1973	Romeo and Juliet	choreography by Kenneth MacMillan, music by Sergei Prokofiev	Juliet	Fonteyn and Nureyev performed the ballet on 12 December and 15 December 1973.
1973	Marguerite and Armand	choreography Frederick Ashton, music by Franz Liszt	Marguerite	Danced by Fonteyn and Nureyev on 20 December and 21 December 1973.
1974	The Sleeping Beauty, Pas de deux	choreography revised by Frederick Ashton, music by Tchaikovsky	female dancer	Fonteyn and Nureyev danced the pas de deux on 17 July 1974.
1975	Don Juan, Pas de deux	choreography Frederick Ashton, music by Richard Strauss	female dancer	Fonteyn and Nureyev danced the pas de deux on 4 March 1975.
1975	The Moor's Pavane	choreography José Limón, music by Henry Purcell	Desdemona	Fonteyn danced the role in June with the Chicago Ballet and repeated the role with Nureyev at The Kennedy Center in Washington, D.C., in July 1975.
1975	Marguerite and Armand	choreography Frederick Ashton, music by Franz Liszt	Marguerite	Performed in New York City at the Uris Theatre in an engagement Fonteyn & Nureyev on Broadway which ran from 18 to 29 November 1975.
1975	Floresta Amazonica	choreography Frederick Ashton, music by Heitor Villa-Lobos	female dancer	The pas de deux was created for Fonteyn by Ashton and performed by her and Nureyev in its US debut during November 1975 in Fonteyn & Nureyev on Broadway.
1975	Le Corsaire Pas de Deux	choreography Marius Petipa, music by Adolphe Adam revised by Cesare Pugni, Léo Delibes, Riccardo Drigo and Petr Oldenbourg	female dancer	Performed by Fonteyn and Nureyev in Fonteyn & Nureyev on Broadway in November 1975.
1976	Romeo and Juliet	choreography by Kenneth MacMillan, music by Sergei Prokofiev	Juliet	Performed by Fonteyn and Nureyev on 5 January, 6 January, and 10 January 1976.
1976	Amazon Forest pas de deux	choreography Frederick Ashton, music by Heitor Villa-Lobos	female dancer	Fonteyn danced with David Wall in the Royal Opera House Premier on 23 November 1976. The ballet had originally been titled Floresta Amazonica.
1977	Hamlet, prelude	choreography by Robert Helpmann, music by Tchaikovsky	Ophelia	Danced by Fonteyn on 30 May 1977.
1979	Salut d'amour à Margot Fonteyn	choreography by Frederick Ashton, music by Edward Elgar	female dancer	Tribute written for Fonteyn by Ashton, the two who danced the roles, for her 60th birthday celebration.
1979	Façade	choreography Frederick Ashton, music by William Walton	Tango dancer	Performed with Robert Helpmann at her 60th birthday tribute.
1979	Le Spectre de la rose	choreography Michel Fokine, music by Carl Maria von Weber	Girl	Performed in the summer 1979 with Nureyev.
1979	L'après-midi d'un faune	choreography Vaslav Nijinsky, music by Claude Debussy	lead nymph	In June 1979, Nureyev persuaded Fonteyn to perform the role with the Festival Ballet in London with him.
1984	Acte de présence	choreography by Frederick Ashton, music by Tchaikovsky	female dancer	Dance written for Fonteyn and himself to perform in honor of Ashton's 80th birthday and the centennial celebrations for New York City's Metropolitan Opera House. The work debuted in New York City on 13 May 1984 and was presented at the Royal Opera House on 18 October 1984.
1986	The Sleeping Beauty	by Tchaikovsky	The Queen	Fonteyn performed the role in Miami, Florida, with the Birmingham Royal Ballet in February 1986.
1988	Baroque Pas de Trois		female dancer	Fonteyn's last performance which was danced with Nureyev and Carla Fracci on 16 September 1988 at the Maratona-Festa a Corte, in Mantua, Italy.

== Television and film ==
Date	Title	broadcaster/producer	Role	Notes
1937	test transmission	BBC	as herself	Fonteyn performed in Giselle with Robert Helpmann and Nocturne
3 May 1937	The Vic-Wells Ballet Company: Les Patineurs	BBC	"white female"	Fonteyn appeared in the company and in pas de deux with Helpmann in Les Patineurs.
13 December 1937	The Vic-Wells Ballet Company: Le Lac des Cygnes, Act II	BBC	"Odette"	
25 March 1939	The Sleeping Princess	BBC	"Aurora"	
7 June 1946	Reopening of the Alexandra Palace	BBC	as herself	
2 October 1947	The Little Ballerina	General Film Distributors	as herself	
10 May 1949	Ballet Recital	BBC	as herself	recital featuring pieces by Sir Frederick Ashton, performed by Fonteyn, Michael Somes and Harold Turner
4 February 1951	Toast of the Town, The Ed Sullivan Show	CBS	as herself	
24 January 1954	Toast of the Town, The Ed Sullivan Show	CBS	as herself	Les Patineurs was performed in an abbreviated version, followed by Somes and Fonteyn dancing the pas de deux from Homage to the Queen.
12 December 1955	Producers' Showcase	NBC	"Aurora"	Live US television colour production of The Sleeping Beauty. This production has been preserved on black-and-white kinescope, and released on DVD.
26 May 1962	Margot Fonteyn Souvenir Program	TCN Channel 9	various	Fonteyn and David Blair danced the pas de deux from Sylvia and she danced in Birthday Offering and Tarantella.
1963	An Evening with the Royal Ballet	British Home Entertainment	female lead	Fonteyn and Nureyev were partnered in Le Corsaire Pas de Deux and the pas de deux from Les Sylphides. The documentary was released in the United States on 1 December 1965.
16 May 1965	The Ed Sullivan Show	CBS	"Odette-Odile"	Fonteyn and Nureyev danced excerpts from Swan Lake.
23 May 1965	The Ed Sullivan Show	CBS	"Odette-Odile"	Encore performance of Fonteyn and Nureyev dancing excerpts from Swan Lake.
