= The Violins of Saint-Jacques =

Opera by Malcolm Williamson

- Opera by Malcolm Williamson
- Librettist: William Chappell
- Language: English
- Based on: Patrick Leigh Fermor's novel
- Premiere: 29 November 1966; Sadler's Wells Theatre, London

The Violins of Saint-Jacques is an opera in three acts by Malcolm Williamson to an English libretto by William Chappell after the 1953 novel by Patrick Leigh Fermor.

It was first performed at Sadler's Wells Theatre in London on 29 November 1966 by Sadler's Wells Opera in a production by Chappell and was revived there and at the London Coliseum in the years immediately following.

Although the opera depicts spectacular scenes on the ocean, a creole carnival and an exploding volcano, the plot is essentially "an intimate romantic drama about young people in love, all the more poignant because of its pointlessness". Musical highlights include the Quartet 'I have another world to show you' and Berthe's aria 'Each afternoon when the swooning breezes cool and die' (recorded by Cheryl Barker), in Act 1; Josephine's 'Let me one day return', the love duet for Sosthène and Berthe 'We'll meet at Beauséjour' and the waltzes of the Mardi gras party in Act 2; and Agenor's aria 'I love this hour' in Act 3. The libretto provides an opposition of two groups of characters: a quartet of serious lovers (Berthe, Sosthène, Josephine, Marcel) and another comic group (Agenor, Mathilde, Joubert), which gives Williamson ample scope for musical portraiture.

The opera was commissioned in association with the Calouste Gulbenkian Foundation.

== Performance history ==
The work, the fifth opera by the composer, was successful during its opening Sadler's Wells production and a revival at the London Coliseum and national UK tour. A BBC radio relay was broadcast on 8 December 1966 and a performance of December 1968 was broadcast on 5 June 1969.

The critical reception was mixed. Opera magazine commented that the opera "seems to have split critical opinion more sharply than any modern work in the past few years". The Spectator defended the composer against those who criticised him for writing in part tunes in a "Strauss-Puccini idiom", also praising Williamson's character music, the dances and for having "an accent and palmprint of his own". The Musical Times expressed disappointment and likened its "romantic panache" to The Sound of Music, and criticised the authors for aiming too low. Grove dubs the work Williamson's "most impressive operatic achievement". Stephen Walsh believed that the second act was the best, because the composer had succeeded well in integrating the set numbers within his "dynamic overall design". Alternatively, others preferred the opening act: "the whole act is a seamless, symphonic outpouring as memorable as anything in English opera".

An Australian Opera production was broadcast by the ABC in 1974 which included an appearance by Pamela Stephenson.

Peter Rice's costume designs are now held at the Victoria and Albert Museum in London.

== Roles ==
Role	Voice type	Premiere cast, 29 November 1966 (Conductor: Vilém Tauský)
Berthe, niece of Count Serindan	soprano	April Cantelo
Agenor, Count De Serindan	bass	Owen Brannigan
Mathilde, Countess Serindan	soprano	Jennifer Vyvyan
Josephine, daughter of the Count and Countess	mezzo-soprano	Patricia Kern
Sosthène, son of the Count and Countess	tenor	David Hillman
Maman Zélie, voodoo priestess	mezzo-soprano	Ann Robson
Sciocca, the governor	tenor	Émile Belcourt
Madame Sciocca	soprano	Wendy Baldwin
Marcel Sciocca, their son	baritone	David Bowman
Captain Henri Joubert	tenor	John Fryatt
François de Chambines		
Gontran de Chambines		
Gentilien the Count's butler	bass	James Singleton
Pierrot		Norman Milne
An old fisherman	bass	Derek Hammond-Stroud
Basket Man, First and Second Netman, First and Second Oarsman		Brian O'Keefe, Paul Jansen, Peter Tracey, Handel Thomas, Donald Solomon, Terence Hall
Chorus:

=== Instrumentation ===
3 flutes (2 double piccolo), 2 oboes and cor anglais, 2 clarinet and bass-clarinet, 2 bassoons and contra-bassoon, 4 horns, 4 trumpets, 3 trombones, 1 tuba, timpani, percussion, organ, 2 harps, strings
Stage Music: flute, clarinet, two horns, four trumpets, three violins, one double bass

== Synopsis ==
Time: Present (Prologue) and Mardi Gras, 1902 (rest of the opera)
Place: Caribbean

=== Prologue and Act 1 ===
In the Prologue, set in the present day, a band of fishermen in the Caribbean casting their nets hear the sound of violins in the distance. The old fisherman tells the others of the legend of the submerged island which rises from the sea to the ghostly sounds of carnival violins on Shrove Tuesday, the day on which it was destroyed by a volcano. The fishermen row away.

The scene changes to the jungle on the island and the rest of the opera depicts events on that fateful day. Sosthène, son of the Count de Serindan, is recently returned from France, and expresses his joy to be back on the island and especially his passion to see again his cousin Berthe; she however still looks on him as a child. Sosthène's sister Josephine and the governor's son, Marcel Sciocca, who are having a secret love affair, meet. Sosthène is angry with his sister's choice of lover, while Berthe is torn by her own love for Josephine.

=== Act 2 ===
The second act is set during the carnival of Mardi Gras, at a ball given by the Count at his colonial villa. He and his wife are awaiting their guests. These include the fop Captain Joubert, two brothers, François and Gontran de Chambines (both drunk), and Governor Sciocca and his wife and son. The evening's entertainment is provided not only by a troupe of masked dancers, but also by the flashing volcano in the distance, which is saluted by the party. The gypsy woman Maman Zélie predicts disaster before the night is over. Josephine and Marcel are by now intending to leave the island together for Paris, and slip out from the party. However, Sosthène has found out that Marcel is married already; and he notes their absence, he persuades Berthe to leave the villa determined to find the lovers and stop them eloping.

The next scene is at the harbourside. Revellers sing for Maman Zélie to cast some spells. When Josephine and Marcel enter, their carefree mood has changed to regret but Marcel is impatient that they go ahead with their plan and he drags her away. Sosthène and Berthe arrive, she worrying about the danger from the volcano. Sosthène tells her to row out to a ship moored off shore in case the fleeing lovers are planning to head for there; meanwhile he will seek them by horse, and that way they can prevent Josephine from leaving the island. When he once more declares his love, Berthe begins to feel love awakening for the man she has so far spurned.

=== Act 3 ===
Sosthène has managed to get the elopers recaptured and the three of them return to the villa still alive with revelry. Marcel's existing marriage is revealed, and he is forbidden to see Josephine again. Sosthène consoles his sister, and the others hope that things will work out well. The volcano then erupts and everyone panics.

Berthe, who as planned had rowed out into the harbour to intercept the two runaways is now the only person alive, and in the final scene at dawn she remembers Saint-Jacques and laments all those she loved.

== See also ==
- Mount Pelée
- Photos of the original cast (April Cantelo, David Hillman, Jennifer Vyvyan, Wendy Baldwin, Owen Brannigan, Ann Robson) at Getty images
