= April Cantelo =

British opera soprano (1928–2024)

- April Cantelo, in the 1950s
- Born: 2 April 1928; Purbrook, Hampshire, England
- Died: 16 July 2024 (aged 96)
- Occupations: Soprano; Pedagogue

April Rosemary Cantelo (2 April 1928 – 16 July 2024) was an English soprano. She created roles in operas by major composers, including the title role of Semele by John Eccles, Helena in Britten's A Midsummer Night's Dream, and in several works by Malcolm Williamson such as English Eccentrics.

== Life and career ==
April Rosemary Cantelo was born in Purbrook, Hampshire, on 2 April 1928, to Herbert Cantelo, an amateur cellist, and Marie, his wife, née Abraham. She attended Chelmsford County High School for Girls. She sang in a church choir and played the piano, taking lessons at the Royal College of Music in London. In 1947 she performed Bach arias with the Chelmsford Festival Orchestra.

Cantelo had an ambition to be a medical researcher, but followed the suggestion of an audition for the Dartington Hall arts college, which came with six months of vocal education, with Imogen Holst, among others. Cantelo was soon accepted to the National Opera Studio in London where she studied with Vilém Tauský and Joan Cross. She sang in the Glyndebourne Chorus, with the New English Singers and with the Deller Consort.

=== Opera ===
Cantelo made her solo debut in 1950, with the Glyndebourne Company at the Edinburgh Festival as Echo in Ariadne auf Naxos by Richard Strauss, then also Barbarina in Mozart's Le nozze di Figaro. She performed at the Glyndebourne Festival the following year as Barbarina, and in 1953 as Echo and as Blonde in Mozart's Die Entführung aus dem Serail, and again in 1963 as Marzelline in Beethoven's Fidelio. She played Rosetta in Love in a Village, the pasticcio by Thomas Arne, at the Aldeburgh Festival in June 1952. In the first half of the 1950s she appeared at the Royal Opera House, in a small role in Mozart's The Marriage of Figaro, as Barbarina, Countess Ceprano in Verdi's Rigoletto and as Poussette in Massenet's Manon.

Cantelo performed in the British premieres of Hans Werner Henze's Boulevard Solitude (as Manon Lescaut) in 1962 and of Kurt Weill's Rise and Fall of the City of Mahagonny (as Jenny) at the Sadler's Wells Opera in 1963. She appeared in the world premiere of Malcolm Williamson's English Eccentrics in 1964, as Miss Beswick. Among the other roles she created were:

- Susan in A Dinner Engagement (Lennox Berkeley, 1954, Aldeburgh)
- Orpah in Ruth (Berkeley, 1956, Scala Theatre, London)
- Helena in A Midsummer Night's Dream (Britten, 1960, Aldeburgh)
- Beatrice Weston in Our Man in Havana (Williamson, 1963, Sadler's Wells)
- Swallow in The Happy Prince (Williamson, 1965, Farnham Parish church)
- Ann in Julius Caesar Jones (Williamson, 1966)
- Berthe in The Violins of Saint-Jacques (Williamson, 1966, Sadler's Wells)
- Semele in Semele (John Eccles, 1972, St John's, Smith Square, London).

In 1974 Cantelo appeared as Xantippe in the first professional UK production of Telemann's Der geduldige Socrates, for Kent Opera.

=== Concert ===
April Cantelo made ten appearances at the Proms between 1958 and 1973, beginning with the first performance of Carl Orff's Carmina Burana conducted by Basil Cameron. She sang in Vaughan Williams's Pastoral Symphony, in Berlioz's Les nuits d'été, and a vocal suite from Williamson's Our Man in Havana. She performed there also in Purcell's The Indian Queen, Cavalli's Messa concertata, excerpts from Monteverdi operas, Purcell odes and Haydn's Nelson Mass.

Cantelo took part in the inaugural concert of the Purcell Room in London on 3 March 1967 ('Homage to Henry Purcell') with Robert Tear, Raymond Leppard and Bernard Richards.

=== Australia and New Zealand, teaching ===
In the 1970s Cantelo was often active in Australia, performing in operas by Williamson. She was a visiting lecturer at the University of Canterbury in New Zealand. Cantelo directed a production of Purcell's The Fairy-Queen in New Zealand in 1972.

In 1979, Cantelo and the conductor Roger Smith founded the Highnam Court Project, to restore a 17th-century mansion which had belonged to Hubert Parry's family, and use it for a foundation for the arts. Her private pupils included Rosemary Joshua. She coached generations of singers in vocal technique, guided their repertoire and encouraged them with "helpful but honest advice".

=== Voice ===
Grove describes her voice as "a pure, clear lyrical soprano, not large, but capable of flexibility and variety of expression", calling her "a very gifted singing actress".

=== Personal life ===
Cantelo met Colin Davis in Glyndebourne in 1948, where the future conductor played clarinet in the orchestra. They were married in 1949. In their first years, called by her an "amateur wilderness", she was the breadwinner in the family. They had two children, Suzanne and Christopher. Davis achieved the post of assistant conductor to the BBC Scottish Symphony Orchestra in 1957. The marriage was dissolved in 1964 after he fell in love with their au pair Ashraf Naini, a young Iranian woman who was visiting London at the time, and who became his second wife.

In retirement, Cantelo settled in Oxfordshire. She trained an amateur choir, All Saints Singers at Sutton Courtenay, and invited former colleagues to sing solos in Masses by Haydn, Bach's Passions and oratorios by Telemann.

Cantelo died on 16 July 2024, at the age of 96.

== Recordings ==
Cantelo recorded a wide repertoire. Among baroque works, she recorded Charpentier's Messe de minuit pour Noël with the Choir of King's College, Cambridge under David Willcocks (for EMI), Handel's Messiah conducted by Walter Susskind (Pye Golden Guinea), Purcell's The Indian Queen under Charles Mackerras (L'oiseau-Lyre, 1966), Purcell's Hail! Bright Cecilia conducted by Michael Tippett (Vanguard), and Handel and Blow anthems as well as Handel's Ode for St. Cecilia's Day conducted by David Willcocks (Argo, 1968). She recorded a solo recital program of 14 songs from the eighteenth century by various composers, all using lyrics by Shakespeare, with Raymond Leppard conducting the English Chamber Orchestra (L'oiseau-Lyre).

In classical and romantic music, she sang Servilia in the English-language performance of Mozart's La clemenza di Tito under John Pritchard, deputising for the indisposed Jennifer Vyvyan (Nimbus Prima Voce). She was the soloist in three Haydn Masses with St. John's College, Cambridge, forces and the Academy of St Martin in the Fields under George Guest (Argo). She recorded part songs by Schubert (Argo, 1967), the roles of Candida and Bettina in Donizetti's Emilia di Liverpool alongside Joan Sutherland (BBC/Myto), Héro in Béatrice et Bénédict by Berlioz, conducted by Colin Davis, and mélodies by him (Philips), Celia in Sullivan's Iolanthe under Sir Malcolm Sargent (HMV), and Solveig songs from Grieg's Peer Gynt with the Royal Philharmonic Orchestra under Alexander Gibson (World Record Club).

Her recordings of music from the 20th century include excerpts from Ariadne auf Naxos, her stage debut, conducted by Sir Thomas Beecham in Edinburgh in 1950 (Beecham Society WSA). She recorded roles by Britten with the composer conducting, Juliet in The Little Sweep (Decca, 1954) and Miss Wordsworth in Albert Herring (Decca, 1964). She recorded music by Williamson, the Swallow in The Happy Prince (Argo, 1965), Ann in Julius Caesar Jones (Argo, 1967) and also vocal works by him and Hugh Wood (Argo).

BBC studio recordings of Wagner's Die Feen (Ada) and Das Liebesverbot (Isabella) have subsequently been issued commercially by Deutsche Grammophon. She recorded Metamorphosis on a Bed-time Theme by Alistair Sampson and Joseph Horovitz at the 1958 Hoffnung Music Festival, and the role of Dracula's daughter in Horrortorio at the 1961 Hoffnung Festival. She also recorded the well-loved Holly and the Ivy LP with Alfred Deller and the Deller Consort. For the sound track of the film The Music Lovers (recorded in 1969), Cantelo sang part of the letter scene from Tchaikovsky's Eugene Onegin.
