= A Dinner Engagement =

Opera by Lennox Berkeley

A Dinner Engagement is a one-act comic opera by Lennox Berkeley, (his Op. 45) to a libretto by Paul Dehn.

The opera was written for Benjamin Britten's English Opera Group. It premiered at the Jubilee Hall, Aldeburgh Festival, in 1954; the first London performance was at Sadler's Wells Theatre on 7 October 1954, with the same cast. The first performance in the USA was at the University of Washington in 1958.

Berkeley's 1967 one-act opera, Castaway (also to a libretto by Dehn) was written as a companion piece to A Dinner Engagement.

== Roles ==
Role	Voice type	Premiere cast, 17 June 1954 (Conductor: Vilém Tauský)
The Earl of Dunmow	bass	Frederick Sharp
The Countess of Dunmow	soprano	Emelie Hooke
Susan, their daughter	soprano	April Cantelo
Mrs. Kneebone	mezzo-soprano	Catherine Lawson
The Grand Duchess	mezzo-soprano	Flora Nielsen
Prince Philippe	tenor	Alexander Young
Errand boy	tenor	John Ford

== Synopsis ==
The impoverished Earl and Countess of Dunmow are preparing a dinner at their flat in Chelsea for the wealthy Grand Duchess of Monteblanco (where the Earl was once ambassador) and her son Prince Phillipe. They are hoping that they can encourage the Prince into marrying their recalcitrant daughter Susan. Despite food burning in the oven, demands from an errand boy for payment of overdue grocer's bills and the eccentricities of Mrs. Kneebone, hired as domestic help for the occasion, the plan is eventually successful.
