= Émile Belcourt =

Canadian operatic tenor

Émile Belcourt (27 June 1926 – 3 August 2017) was a Canadian operatic tenor. He appeared in operas at English National Opera and elsewhere, and also appeared in musicals.

== Early life ==
Belcourt was born in Lafleche, Saskatchewan, in 1926, son of Adrien Belcourt and Jeanne née Rivard. His mother, a church organist and pianist for silent films, encouraged his musical talents.

He served in the Canadian navy towards the end of the Second World War. In 1949 he obtained a degree in pharmacy; while studying he continued singing lessons, and in 1949 he won a prestigious singing event in Saskatchewan, the Justice Brown Competition. Persuaded there that he should be in London, Belcourt auditioned with John Pritchard; as a result he joined the chorus at Glyndebourne in Sussex, England. During subsequent years he studied in Vienna and Paris.

== Operatic career ==
His teacher in Vienna, Editha Fleischer, advised that he should move to baritone roles, and he unwisely made this change from 1951 with contracts in Bonn and Ulm. Following the misjudgment, he retrained in Paris and achieved success as Pelléas in Debussy's Pelléas et Mélisande for French radio.

In 1962, Belcourt appeared in Scottish Opera's first season, as Pelléas. He returned to Scottish Opera in the later years, including their production of Verdi's Otello in the second season, and as Shuysky in Mussorgsky's Boris Godunov in 1965.

In London, he appeared in 1962 with the Royal Opera as Gonzalve in L'heure espagnole by Ravel. In the following year he appeared with Sadler's Wells Opera as Pluto in Offenbach's Orpheus in the Underworld (repeating the role twenty years later in the 1983 BBC television production). During the following thirty years, he played many roles at Sadler's Wells (later renamed English National Opera); these included Eisenstein in Die Fledermaus and Loge in Das Rheingold, as well as Herod in Salome, Shuysky in Boris Godunov, Dr Suda in Osud and Sciocca in The Violins of Saint-Jacques (creation, 1966), and he participated in the premieres of Toussaint by David Blake and The Royal Hunt of the Sun by Iain Hamilton.

Belcourt appeared in musicals, including Man of La Mancha in London's West End in 1968 and Kiss Me, Kate at Sadler's Wells in 1970. In 1988, as Émile de Becque, he was in South Pacific at the Prince of Wales Theatre. He created the role of the neurologist in The Man who Mistook his Wife for a Hat by Michael Nyman in 1986.

He was described in the Financial Times as "a character tenor of great accomplishment".

Belcourt returned to Canada in 1992 and settled in Toronto. He died there in August 2017, aged 91.

== Family ==
Belcourt married Margaret Eagle in 1951, and they had seven children. The marriage was dissolved, and in 1980 he married the operatic soprano Norma Burrowes; they had two children.
