= Jennifer Vyvyan =

British opera singer (1925 – 1974

- Born: Jennifer Brigit Vyvyan; 13 March 1925; Broadstairs, England
- Died: 5 April 1974 (aged 49); London, England
- Education: Royal Academy of Music
- Occupation: Classical soprano
- Years active: 1948–1974
- Known for: Collaboration with Benjamin Britten

Jennifer Brigit Vyvyan (13 March 1925 – 5 April 1974) was a British classical soprano. She had an active international career in operas, concerts, and recitals from 1948 up until her death in 1974. She possessed a beautifully clear, steady voice with considerable flexibility in florid music. She was praised for her subtle phrasing and her dramatic gifts enabled her to create vivid individual portrayals. Although she sang a broad repertoire, she is particularly remembered for her association with the works of Benjamin Britten; notably singing roles created for her in the world premieres of several of his operas with the English Opera Group.

On the concert stage, Vyvyan was highly active as an oratorio singer. The warmth and flexibility of her voice made her an outstanding exponent of the music of Purcell, Handel and other baroque composers. She frequently collaborated with the Royal Choral Society, often under conductor Malcolm Sargent, and sang countless performances of Messiah throughout Britain and abroad – not least, with the Berlin Philharmonic.

== Biography ==
Born in Broadstairs, England, Vyvyan entered the Royal Academy of Music in 1941 where she initially was a piano student. She was convinced by a faculty member to pursue a singing career and began her initial studies as a mezzo-soprano. During her last two and a half years at the conservatory she studied with Roy Henderson who trained her in the soprano repertoire. After graduating in 1947 she went to Milan for further studies and later studied privately with Fernando Carpi in Geneva in 1950. In 1951 she won the Geneva International Music Competition.

In 1948 Vyvyan became a member of Benjamin Britten's English Opera Group (EOG), making her professional debut with the company as Jenny Diver in the première of Britten's version of John Gay's The Beggar's Opera. She appeared in several more roles with the organisation over the next two years, including Nancy in Albert Herring and the Female Chorus in The Rape of Lucretia. In 1951 she created the role of the Matron in the premiere of Brian Easdale's The Sleeping Children with the EOG in Cheltenham.

In 1952 Vyvyan joined the roster of principal sopranos at the Sadler's Wells Opera, making a triumphant debut with the company as Konstanze in Wolfgang Amadeus Mozart's Die Entführung aus dem Serail. She returned to that house later in the season to portray Donna Anna in Don Giovanni. On 8 June 1953 she made her Royal Opera, London debut as Lady Penelope Rich in the world premiere of Britten's Gloriana, a production organised by the EOG. She sang in another EOG production for her debut at La Fenice on 14 September 1954; this time The Governess in the premiere of Britten's The Turn of the Screw.

Vyvyan sang in many more world premieres during her career, including Tytania in Britten's A Midsummer Night's Dream (Aldeburgh Festival, 1960), the Countess de Serindan in Malcolm Williamson's The Violins of Saint-Jacques (1966, Sadler's Wells), various roles in Williamson's Lucky-Peter's Journey (1969, Sadler's Wells) and Mrs. Julian in Britten's Owen Wingrave (1971, BBC television). She also premiered Arthur Bliss's The Beatitudes in the 1962 festival for the opening of Coventry Cathedral, and gave the first UK performance of Britten's Cantata Academica in 1961 as well as the UK premiere of Poulenc's Les Mammelles de Tiresias (Aldeburgh 1958). Britten's spelling change to use Tytania in A Midsummer Night's Dream rather than Shakespeare's Titania was a tribute to Vyvyan.

In 1953 Vyvyan portrayed Elettra in Idomeneo at the Glyndebourne Festival. Further opera performances and concerts took her to the stages of Milan, Rome, Munich, Vienna, Paris and Amsterdam. In 1955 she undertook a major tour of the Soviet Union as part of a delegation of British artists organised by Sir Arthur Bliss. In 1969 she performed at the Lucerne Festival. She remained a regular presence at the Royal Opera House as well during the 1950s and 1960s.

On the concert stage, Vyvyan performed throughout Europe and the United States under such conductors as Carlo Maria Giulini, Leonard Bernstein, Rafael Kubelik, Pierre Monteux, Ernest Ansermet, Victor de Sabata, Josef Krips and Britten, excelling in performances of British music. She also appeared often on the radio and on television, including some of the earliest complete operas broadcast on British TV. She excelled in Handel and played a major role in the revival of his operas/oratorios – with pioneering performances of Athalia, Samson, Amadigi, Rinaldo, Saul, and the first known staging in modern times of Radamisto (Sadlers Wells, 1960). She was also known for her interpretations of the soprano solos in Beethoven's Symphony No. 9, Britten's War Requiem, and Bach's St John Passion and St Matthew Passion.

Having never retired, Vyvyan died from complications of a longstanding bronchial illness on 5 April 1974 at the age of 49. Her husband Leon Crown and their son Jonathan Crown (1964-2020) survived her.

== Recordings ==
Vyvyan's association with Benjamin Britten was a notable period of her career. Britten wrote four roles specifically for Vyvyan: Penelope Rich (Gloriana), The Governess (The Turn of The Screw), Tytania (A Midsummer Night's Dream), and Mrs Julian (Owen Wingrave). She can be heard on recordings of Britten's The Turn of the Screw, The Little Sweep, Owen Wingrave, Cantata Academica and Spring Symphony. Her Tytania can now be heard in an original cast recording of Britten's A Midsummer Night's Dream on Testament records, her Lady Rich, called by John Steane "a remarkable study in edgy pride" can be found on Music Preserved and her deliciously neurotic Mrs Julian can be heard on Decca. Vyvyan is featured in Britten's realizations of Purcell's The Fairy-Queen and Gay's The Beggar's Opera. Her Handel recordings include Semele, Saul, and two separate recordings of Messiah; one with conductor Sir Adrian Boult and the other under the baton of Sir Thomas Beecham. She collaborated with Beecham and the Beecham Choral Society on a recording of Beethoven's Mass in C with fellow singers Monica Sinclair, Richard Lewis, and Marian Nowakowski. Her recital records include "Songs of England" with Ernest Lush, piano, Mozart arias conducted by Peter Maag, Scarlatti cantatas with Elsie Morison, and Haydn and Mozart concert arias conducted by Harry Newstone.

== Sources ==
- D. Brook, Singers of Today (Revised Edition – Rockliff, London 1958), 192–194.
- Karl-Josef Kutsch; Leo Riemens (1969). A concise biographical dictionary of singers: from the beginning of recorded sound to the present. Translated from German, expanded and annotated by Harry Earl Jones. Philadelphia: Chilton Book Company. ISBN 0-8019-5516-5.
