= Lawrance Collingwood =

English conductor, composer and record producer (1887–1982)

Lawrance Arthur Collingwood CBE (14 March 1887 – 19 December 1982) was an English conductor, composer and record producer.

== Career ==
Collingwood was born in London and attended Westminster Choir School, beginning his musical career as a choirboy at Westminster Abbey from 1897 to 1902. Around 1903 he attended High Wycombe Royal Grammar School. Appointed organist at St Thomas's Hospital and then at All Saints, Gospel Oak, he studied at the Guildhall School of Music and Exeter College (1907–1911), where he was organ scholar.

In the autumn of 1911 he went to Russia and enrolled at the Saint Petersburg Conservatory where he studied under Alexander Glazunov, Maximilian Steinberg and Nikolai Tcherepnin. After graduating Collingwood returned to England in 1918 to begin military service but went back to Russia and worked for some years as assistant conductor to Albert Coates at the Saint Petersburg Opera. He also conducted at the Mariinsky Theatre. He also served as interpreter for Winston Churchill's expedition in support of White Russian forces in Northern Russia (1918-1919). His two piano sonatas, which show the influence of Alexander Scriabin, were published in Saint Petersburg.

In England, he built his reputation at first as a composer: his Symphonic Poem (1918) was presented by the Royal College of Music; he himself conducted its professional premiere at the Queen's Hall in 1922, and the work was published as the result of a Carnegie Award. The first modern performance and recording was broadcast on 24 October 1995, played by the BBC Concert Orchestra conducted by Barry Wordsworth. In 1920 Lilian Baylis appointed Collingwood as the chorus master for her opera company at the Old Vic in London. Despite the poor conditions he persevered and made a significant contribution to the improved musical standards at the company. He conducted opera at the Old Vic and Sadler's Wells Theatre, becoming principal conductor at Sadler's Wells in 1931. Collingwood did much to establish Sadler's Wells as a viable alternative to Covent Garden. He gave early British performances of operas by Mussorgsky and Rimsky-Korsakov. His own first opera, Macbeth, was presented there under his own direction on 12 April 1934, with Joan Cross singing Lady Macbeth. Music from the opera had already been played in the Queen's Hall on 10 November 1927 and it would be revived in Hammersmith in 1970. A recording of excerpts from Collingwood conducting Lohengrin during his Sadler's Wells years survives, with Henry Wendon in the title role, plus Joan Cross and Constance Willis, offering an example his work at the time.

In January 1934, Collingwood conducted the London Symphony Orchestra in a recording of the Triumphal March from Caractacus and the Woodland Interlude by Sir Edward Elgar, supervised by the composer himself by telephone from his sickbed before his death a month later.

Collingwood made his debut at the Royal Opera House in December 1936 with Humperdinck's Hänsel und Gretel. He conducted Sadler's Wells Opera around the UK during the Second World War in stressful and primitive conditions, and retired from the company in 1946. He was made a Commander of the Order of the British Empire in 1948.

Although most of his professional life was spent in Britain, Collingwood travelled to Berlin to supervise recordings by Yehudi Menuhin and Wilhelm Furtwängler, and to oversee the 1956 Meistersinger conducted by Rudolf Kempe. In 1950 and the following year he played a key role in recordings involving Pablo Casals, first in Prades then in Perpignan.

Collingwood's second opera, The Death of Tintagiles, set to Alfred Sutro's translation of Maurice Maeterlinck's drama, was premiered on 16 April 1950. His other compositions include a piano concerto and a piano quartet.

Collingwood brought many foreign operas to the British stage for the first time. His premieres as a conductor included:

- on 30 September 1935 at Sadler's Wells, the first performance outside Russia of Modest Mussorgsky's original version of Boris Godunov. It was sung to an English translation by M. D. Calvocoressi
- on 9 April 1946, the first professional performance of Ralph Vaughan Williams' opera Sir John in Love.

Nikolai Medtner dedicated his song The Raven to Lawrance Collingwood.

Collingwood died in Killin, Perthshire, Scotland on 19 December, 1982, at the age of 95.

== Record producer ==
Concurrently with his conducting activity Collingwood worked in the recording industry; from 1926 to 1957 he was a musical supervisor for the Gramophone Company (later EMI) and was Musical Advisor for the company from 1938 to 1972. He remained a freelance, retained for a certain number of sessions per week for which he was sent plans each week. From the 1920s he supervised nearly all Edward Elgar's recordings for His Master's Voice and in the 1930s was assigned to the project of conducting electrically recorded orchestral accompaniments to be overdubbed onto acoustic recordings of Enrico Caruso and Luisa Tetrazzini.

He worked as a record producer from the days of Fred Gaisberg, and was later a colleague of Walter Legge. He was EMI's producer of Sir Thomas Beecham's recordings of the music of Frederick Delius from 1946 onwards. He also produced recordings conducted by Wilhelm Furtwängler and Herbert von Karajan, including Dietrich Fischer-Dieskau's recording of Gustav Mahler's Lieder eines fahrenden Gesellen (under Furtwängler), Kindertotenlieder and songs from Des Knaben Wunderhorn. He produced Vittorio Gui's recording of Mozart's The Marriage of Figaro.

== Recordings ==
Collingwood recorded for His Master's Voice from 1922 until 1971. His recordings include:

- Vivaldi's Violin Concerto in G minor, with Mischa Elman and the New Philharmonia Orchestra
- Bach Violin Concertos with Mischa Elman
- orchestral accompaniments for some of the most famous singers of his time: Marian Anderson, Beniamino Gigli, Friedrich Schorr, Feodor Chaliapin, Lauritz Melchior, Elisabeth Schumann, John McCormack, Walter Widdop, Joseph Hislop, Elsie Suddaby, Norman Walker, Joan Hammond, Maria Caniglia, Peter Dawson, Florence Austral, Göta Ljungberg, Fernand Ansseau, Sena Jurinac, Rita Gorr, Otakar Kraus, Webster Booth, and Sir Keith Falkner
- Mozart's Piano Concerto No. 24 K. 491 with Edwin Fischer and the London Philharmonic Orchestra in 1937 originally issued on eight His Master's Voice/Victor 78 sides and subsequently transferred LP and finally to EMI CD.
- 90 Motives from Wagner's Ring Cycle
- Excerpts from Act III of Wagner's Tristan und Isolde
- Ernst von Dohnányi's Variations on a Nursery Tune, Op. 25, with the London Symphony Orchestra and the composer at the piano
- Lighter music of Elgar (1964): includes Chanson de Matin, Minuet from Beau Brummel, Salut d'amour, Dream Children, Organ Grinder's songs from The Starlight Express, with the Royal Philharmonic Orchestra.
- Other miscellaneous orchestral works include Glinka's 'Jota aragonesa' (Philharmonia Orchestra, 1948), Thomas Overture to Raymond (Philharmonia Orchestra, 1948), Dvorak Carnival Overture, op. 92 (Philharmonia Orchestra, 1953), Borodin "In the Steppes of Central Asia" (Philharmonia Orchestra, 1953), Gliere The Red Poppy – Russian Sailor's Dance (1953), Schumann Overture, Scherzo and Finale, op. 52 (London Symphony Orchestra, 1953), Grieg 'Two elegiac melodies, op. 34, no. 2 – The Last Spring' (London Symphony Orchestra, 1957), Elgar Serenade in E minor, op. 20 (London Symphony Orchestra, 1953), Smetana, Overture Prodaná Nevestá (The Bartered Bride) (Sadler's Wells Orchestra, 1946), Beethoven Egmont overture, op. 84 (London Symphony Orchestra, 1953), Wagner Die Meistersinger von Nürnberg – Prelude to act 1 (Westminster Symphony Orchestra, 1953).

== Sources ==
- Grove's Dictionary of Music and Musicians, 5th ed. (1954), Vol. II, pp. 377–378
- Moore, Jerrold Northrop. Edward Elgar: A Creative Life. Oxford University Press, 1987. ISBN 978-0-19-284014-1

Cultural offices
| Preceded by Charles Corri | Music Director, Sadler's Wells; 1941–1946 | Succeeded by James Robertson |
