= Elyse Dodgson =

English theatre producer

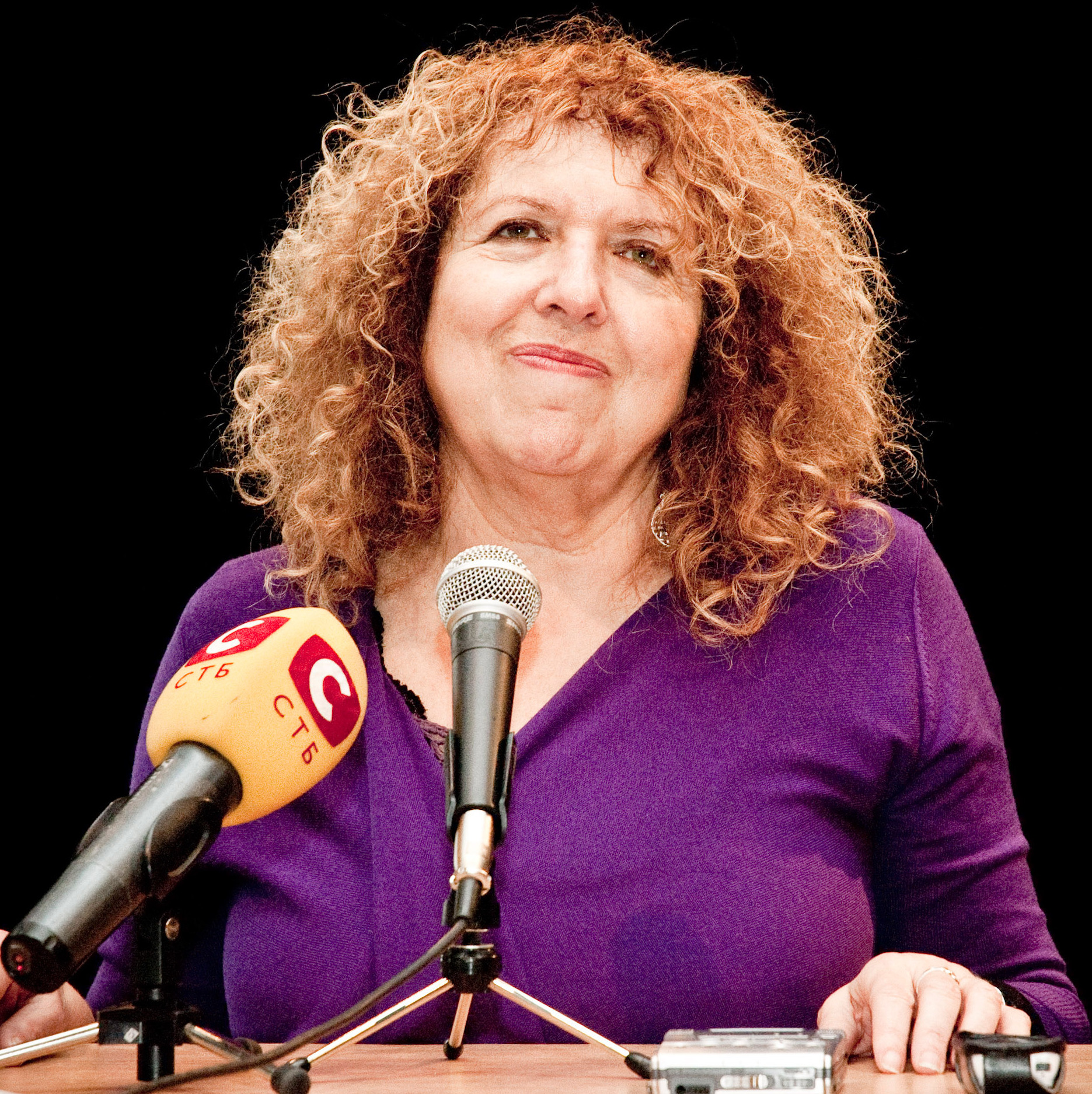
Dodgson in 2011

Elyse Dodgson (1945 – 23 October 2018) MBE was an English theatre producer. In 1996, she co-founded the International Department at the Royal Court Theatre and ran this for over 20 years. In this time she worked with playwrights and coordinated play development projects in more than 70 countries. According to April De Angelis, Dodgson was "responsible for thousands of new plays written in voices that may otherwise have remained silent."

== Career ==
Dodgson was born in New York, and moved to Britain in 1968, joining the Brighton Combination, a radical underground theatre company. After starting a family, she became a teacher and worked as head of drama at Vauxhall Manor, a girls’ comprehensive in South London. Here she developed a pioneering approach to developing plays by starting with personal testimony of historical events. Several of these plays were produced at the Oval House Theatre, including the influential Motherland in 1982, about women in the Windrush generation, which was based on interviews with many of the pupil's mothers on their experience migrating from the West Indies to Britain. Dodgson then used this last play as the basis of an influential textbook for Secondary Schools.

=== Royal Court Young People's Theatre ===
Dodgson was hired in 1985 by Max Stafford-Clark to become Director of the Royal Court Young People’s Theatre. Here she created plays with young actors including Sophie Okonedo (Women and Sisters by Sandra Agard, A Rock in Water by Winsome Pinnock), as well as working with young writers such as Shaun Duggan and Jonathan Harvey, selecting and producing plays for the Royal Court Young Writers’ Festival, which ran from 1986 to 1991.

=== International Theatre ===
Elyse Dodgson led the International Theatre department at the Royal Court Theatre from 1996 until her death in 2018. The seeds of her involvement with international theatre included the setting up of an International Summer School at the Court in 1989, and collaborations with the Deutsches Theater, Berlin starting in 1992. The international department, with Dodgson at the helm, was then created in 1996 by Stephen Daldry, then the Royal Court Artistic Director. The first long term writer's workshop programme with a partner country was initiated in 1996 when Dodgson, along with Stephen Jeffreys and Hettie MacDonald travelled to Uganda.

Over the next twenty two years, Dodgson developed partnerships, held workshops, and produced translated readings and plays by playwrights in over 70 countries, from Europe, the Middle East, Cuba, Central and South America, Nigeria, Southern Africa, India and finally China.

New plays would be developed during International Workshops, often led by Dodgson. In addition, a central component for developing new international playwriting talent was the International Residency, which developed from the original fee-paying Summer School to an annual event where writers from different countries would come together in London and each develop a new play in collaboration with members of the Royal Court artistic team. The programme would include group sessions led by prominent British theatre makers, such as Harold Pinter, David Hare, Caryl Churchill, and Sarah Kane. Many of the plays developed from these workshops and residencies would go on to appear at the Royal Court Theatre.

== Selected productions ==
- Motherland, by Dodgson and company (Vauxhall Manor School)
- A Rock In Water, by Winsome Pinnock
- Fireface, by Marius von Mayenburg
- Plasticine, by Vasily Sigarev
- Terrorism, by the Presnyakov Brothers
- Mr Kolpert by David Gieselmann
- My Name is Rachel Corrie (from the diaries of Rachel Corrie), edited by Alan Rickman and Katherine Viner
- Disconnect, By Anupama Chandrasekhar
- The Djinns of Eidgah by Abhishek Majumdar
- Feast by Yunior Garca Aguilera (Cuba), Rotimi Babatunde (Nigeria), Marcos Barbosa (Brazil), Tanya Barfield (US) and Gbolahan Obisesan (UK); directed by Rufus Norris
- Bad Roads by Natal'ya Vorozhbit
- Fireworks (Al'ab Nariya) by Dalia Taha
- I See You by Mongiwekhaya; directed by Noma Dumezweni

== Death ==
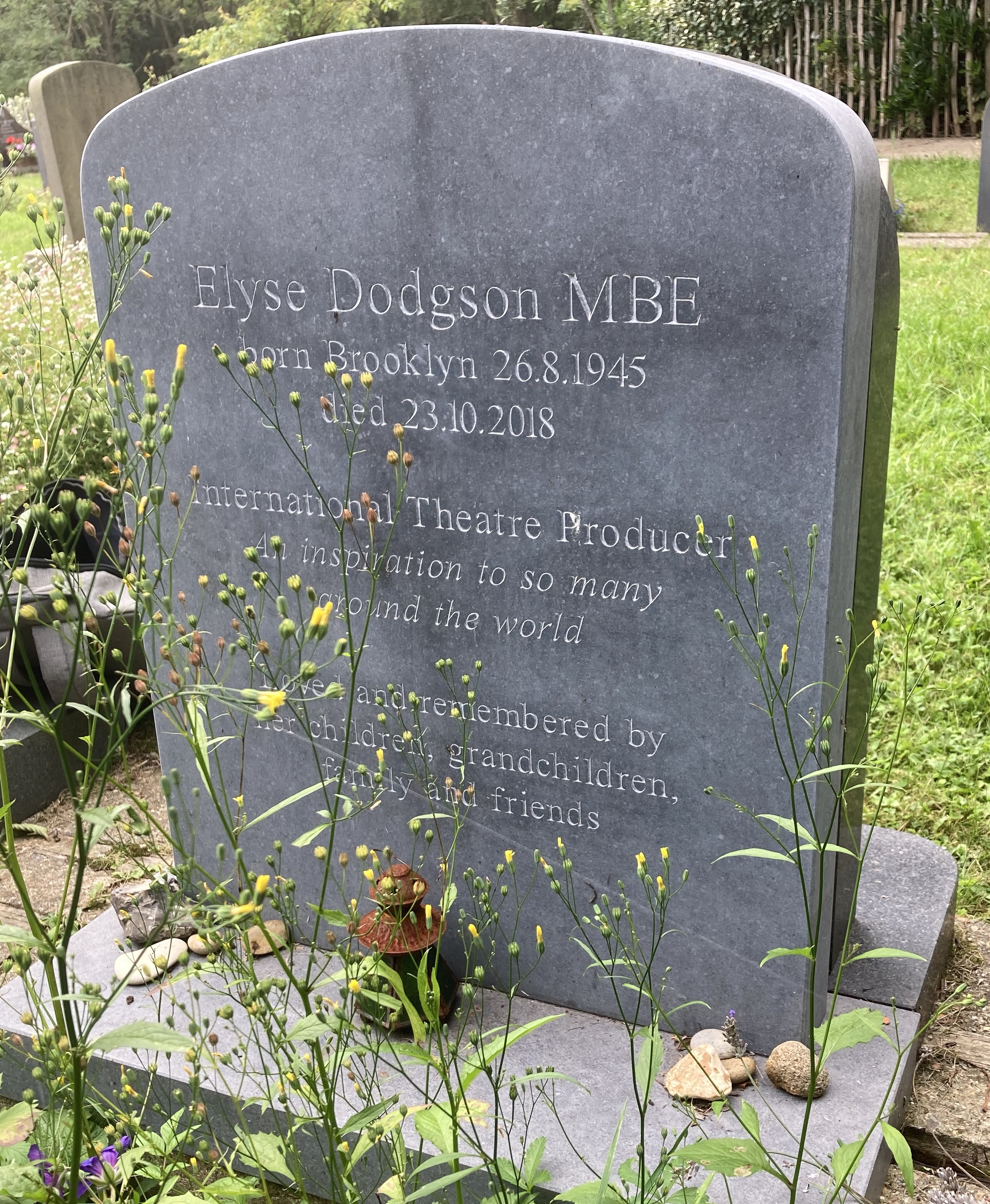
Grave of Elyse Dodgson in Highgate Cemetery

Dodgson died on 23 October 2018 and was buried on the eastern side of Highgate Cemetery.

== Awards, honours and legacy ==
In 2004, Dodgson received the Young Vic Award and she was made an MBE for services to international theatre and young writers overseas in 2010.

In 2019 The Royal Court Theatre announced a new biennial commission, in Dodgson's name, to support an international playwright to write a new play, with each award given to a playwright from a different region around the world.
