= Iris Kells =

Kells, unknown date

Iris Victoria Kells (31 January 1923 – 10 August 2016) was an English operatic soprano. She played leading roles in the 1960s at Sadler's Wells Opera.

== Life ==
Iris Kells was born in Pachmarhi in India; her father was a colonel in the Indian army. The family moved to Britain in 1939, and she enrolled at the Royal College of Music, studying with Ralph Vaughan Williams. She later studied with the baritone Clive Carey.

In 1949 she joined the chorus of the Royal Opera. She was in the premiere in 1951 of The Pilgrim's Progress, by Vaughan Williams, as the Woodcutter's Boy. She played other small singing roles; she was of small stature, and was often cast as a child or animal.

Looking elsewhere, she performed in concert and oratorio. In 1958 she took part in the first recording of the opera Peter Grimes, by Benjamin Britten, in the role of Second Niece.

In that year she played Gretel in Hansel and Gretel at Sadler's Wells Opera; the reviewer of The Stage wrote that she had "a clear voice of much sweetness". At the same theatre she appeared in a revival of Vaughan Williams's opera Riders to the Sea, in the role of Cathleen. She appeared in several more productions at Sadler's Wells, including Don Giovanni in 1960, as Zerlina; Cosi fan tutte in 1962, as Despina; and Offenbach's La Vie parisienne in 1964, as Gabrielle.

She was treated for a benign brain tumour in 1966. After the 1960s she made few singing appearances. In the 1970s she was understudy for Judi Dench in The Good Companions at Her Majesty's Theatre, and she sang for the Ice Capades at Wembley.

== Family ==
She married in 1947 the conductor Leonard Hancock; the marriage was later dissolved. In 1967 she married Stephen Arlen, the managing director of Sadler's Wells Opera, and they had a daughter, Juliette. Arlen died in 1972.

Kells died in 2016, aged 93.
