= Norman Tucker =

Tucker with Lotte Lenya at Sadler's Wells Theatre, 1958

Norman Walter Gwynn Tucker CBE (24 April 1910 – 10 August 1978) was an English musician, administrator and translator. Trained as a concert pianist, he was invited to join Sadler's Wells Opera in 1947 in an administrative role, and from 1948 to 1966 he was the managerial head of the company.

His translations of operas new to the repertoire and fresh translations of repertoire works were performed by the company at Sadler's Wells Theatre and, after his retirement and the company's move, at the London Coliseum.

== Early years ==
Tucker was born in the London suburb of Wembley, the son of Walter Edwin Tucker and his wife Agnes Janet. He was educated at St Paul’s School, London, New College, Oxford, and the Royal College of Music. He graduated from the last with a performance of Brahms's Second Piano Concerto conducted by Sir Thomas Beecham.

== Piano career ==
From 1935 until the Second World War he pursued a career as a concert pianist. During the war he served first as a stretcher-bearer in a hospital and then as private secretary to successive Chancellors of the Exchequer, Sir Kingsley Wood, Sir John Anderson and Hugh Dalton. After the war, Tucker resumed his career as a pianist, but in 1947 the conductor James Robertson invited him to join Sadler’s Wells Opera as joint director with himself and his co-conductor Michael Mudie. They were dubbed "the three Norns" by the company.

== Administrative career ==
The two conductors soon handed over all administrative responsibility to Tucker, who ran the company from 1948 until 1966. His experience at HM Treasury was valuable in the company's frequent negotiations with the Arts Council which dispensed the scarce public subsidies for the arts, and Tucker did much to secure the funding necessary for the survival of Sadler's Wells in the 1950s and 1960s. For the company Tucker provided new translations to replace some of the stilted old ones, and translated other libretti into English for the first time. Prominent among the latter was Piave's libretto for Verdi's Simon Boccanegra of which Sadler's Wells gave the British premiere in 1948. Other Verdi operas he translated were Luisa Miller and Don Carlos. Tucker was enthusiastic about the operas of Janáček (as was one of the company's rising young conductors, Charles Mackerras) and he translated Katya Kabanova, The Cunning Little Vixen and The Makropulos Affair for their Sadler’s Wells premieres.

Tucker laid great emphasis on the dramatic side of opera, and was proud of attracting leading theatre directors to work at Sadler's Wells; they included Michel Saint-Denis, Glen Byam Shaw and George Devine. He introduced operetta to the company's repertoire. It proved a financial blessing. The success of The Merry Widow saved the company from financial crisis in 1958. That box-office hit, followed by another with Orpheus in the Underworld (1960), made him determined to stage Gilbert and Sullivan as soon the operas came out of copyright and the D'Oyly Carte Company's monopoly ceased at the end of 1961. Iolanthe and The Mikado (both 1962) were box-office successes, and popular with the company, though less so with the higher-minded members of the Sadler's Wells board.

== Forced retirement ==
Other tensions between Tucker and the board, combined with his great disappointment when a plan for a new opera house on the South Bank of the Thames was abandoned, badly affected his health. He began to drink excessively, and his contract was terminated by the board on 8 March 1966. He was succeeded by his deputy, Stephen Arlen.

== Death ==
After his enforced retirement, Tucker continued to have ties with the company, making further translations including another Janáček opera, The Excursions of Mr. Brouček (1978). By the time the piece was staged, Tucker had died, aged 68; the first night was dedicated to his memory.
