= Judy Bellingham =

New Zealand opera singer and teacher (born 1949 or 1950)

Judy Bellingham MNZM
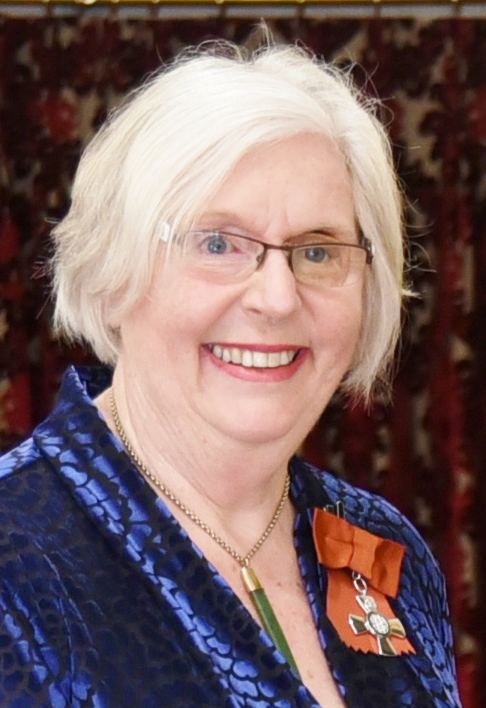
- Bellingham in 2016
- Born: 1949 or 1950 (age 75–76)
- Other name: Elizabeth Judy Bellingham
- Awards: New Zealand 1990 Commemoration Medal, Member of the New Zealand Order of Merit

Academic background
- Academic advisors: Antonio Moretti-Pananti, Otakar Kraus

Elisabeth Judy Bellingham (born 1949 or 1950) is a New Zealand opera singer, teacher, and author. She was an associate professor at the University of Otago. In 2016 Bellingham was appointed a Member of the New Zealand Order of Merit for services to classical singing. Bellingham once held the world record for the longest improvised operatic cadenza.

== Early life and education ==
Bellingham was born in England and emigrated to New Zealand with her parents when she was eight. Her father was an Anglican vicar in Ōpōtiki, and she grew up there and in Wainuiomata. Bellingham learned to play piano at the age of eleven, receiving lessons first from her mother, and then the church organist, who also taught her to sing. Bellingham was not allowed to study music for school certificate as a fourth form teacher said she "had no ability in music and should give it up". Bellingham studied a Bachelor of Arts in music and languages at the University of Canterbury, and participated in the student music society. Society members noticed that the world record for the longest cadenza (improvised passage following an aria) was set by an Italian tenor in 1815, and proposed that Bellingham attempt to better the 25 minute time. In 1973 she gained the world record with a cadenza of 28 minutes 23 seconds. Bellingham later gained a masters degree in entrepreneurship, with distinction from the University of Otago.

== Singing career ==
After her first professional performance in 1974, Bellingham travelled to Melbourne to train with Antonio Moretti-Pananti, and then London to study with Otakar Kraus. Kraus trained Bellingham as a mezzo-soprano, although she later sang soprano, having found her voice changed after the removal of her tonsils. Bellingham created six operatic roles, and sang with the major choirs and orchestras in New Zealand over a forty year singing career. She performed in England, Europe, the United States, South America, Russia, Taiwan and Libya.

Bellingham joined the faculty of the University of Otago as a senior lecturer in 1994, and was later appointed William Evans Associate Professor in Voice. She retired from the university in 2019, having taught around 300 students. She also researched the history of music in New Zealand, and recorded a CD of New Zealand songs and DVD of early Dunedin songs. She also wrote a book on sightsinging, Sing What You See, See What You Sing.

Bellingham is an international voice consultant and vocal clinician, and has worked with the National Youth Choir of Great Britain, the Royal Copenhagen Chapel Choir, the David Jorlett Chorale in the USA and the Dan Laoghaire Choral Society in Dublin. She has taught for Glyndebourne Festival Opera, and was a lecturer at Tunghai University's International Music Festival.

Bellingham was President of the New Zealand Association of Teachers of Singing for six years, a Board member for the New Zealand Youth Choir, Chair of the Dunedin Performing Arts Competitions Society, and adjudicator for the New Zealand Choral Federation’s The Big Sing, and Artistic Director and tutor at the biennial residential New Zealand Singing School in Napier.

== Honours and awards ==
In the 2016 Queen's Birthday Honours, Bellingham was appointed a Member of the New Zealand Order of Merit for services to classical singing. Bellingham received a New Zealand 1990 Commemoration Medal.
