= Otakar Kraus =

Czech (later British) operatic baritone and teacher

Otakar Kraus OBE (10 December 1909 — 28 July 1980) was a Czech (later British), operatic baritone and teacher.

He was born in Prague and studied there with Konrad Wallerstein and in Milan with Fernando Carpi. He himself was the teacher of a number of important British basses, including Robert Lloyd, Willard White, John Tomlinson, Gwynne Howell and Colin Iveson. He taught the British baritone John Rawnsley, and also taught New Zealand baritones Barry Mora and David Griffiths and soprano Judy Bellingham.

He made his operatic debut as Amonasro in Aida in Brno in 1935. From 1936 to 1939 he sang as principal baritone at the Slovak National Theatre in Bratislava. In 1940, he moved to England, appearing at the Savoy Theatre in Mussorgsky's The Fair at Sorochyntsi, and from 1943 to 1946 he appeared with the Carl Rosa Opera Company, singing Scarpia, Germont, the three roles in Hoffmann and other parts. After seasons with the English Opera Group and the Netherlands Opera, he joined the Royal Opera House, Covent Garden in 1951, and sang there until 1973.

Kraus specialised in villainous characters. His roles at Covent Garden and worldwide included Don Pizarro in Fidelio, Iago in Otello and Scarpia in Tosca, as well as Alberich in the Ring cycle at the Bayreuth Festival from 1960 to 1962. He created the roles of Nick Shadow in Stravinsky's The Rake's Progress, Tarquinius in Britten's The Rape of Lucretia, King Fisher in Michael Tippett's The Midsummer Marriage, Diomede in Walton's Troilus and Cressida, and the Sheriff in Gian Carlo Menotti's Martin's Lie.

He died in London.

The Otakar Kraus Music Trust, a charity which provides music therapy to children and adults with special needs, was founded by Dr. Margaret Lobo, a former pupil, in memory of him. It was founded in 1988 in Twickenham, London and now operates in that local area and also in India.

His name is mentioned in the Czech film "Cosy Dens" (1999) by Jirí Kodet (as Kraus).
