= James Robertson (conductor) =

English conductor

James Robertson CBE (17 June 1912 – 18 May 1991) was an English conductor, best known as musical director of Sadler's Wells Opera.

Robertson was born in Liverpool and was educated at Winchester College and Trinity College, Cambridge, before studying music at the Leipzig Conservatory and the Royal College of Music in London. He joined the music staff of Glyndebourne Festival Opera in 1937 and became chorus master and repetiteur of the Carl Rosa Opera in 1938. After the Second World War, in which he served in the Royal Air Force, he was appointed musical director of the Sadler's Wells Opera in 1946, serving in the post until 1954. Together with the conductor Michael Mudie and the administrator Norman Tucker, he formed a triumvirate that ran the company.

In 1954 Robertson left to become conductor of the New Zealand National Orchestra (now the New Zealand Symphony Orchestra), succeeding Michael Bowles. He returned to Britain in 1958, conducting the Carl Rosa company and as a regular guest conductor at Sadler's Wells.

Robertson was opera adviser to the Théâtre Royale de la Monnaie in Brussels in 1960, followed by a further spell in New Zealand, where he was artistic director of the National Opera (1962–3). In 1964 he became director of the London Opera Centre, where he encouraged many young singers who later achieved success on the operatic stage. He retired as director in 1977, though remaining a consultant. He returned once more to New Zealand, conducting there from 1978 to 1981.

Robertson died in Ruabon, North Wales, aged 79.

== Notes ==
Cultural offices
| Preceded by Lawrance Collingwood | Music Director, Sadler's Wells; 1946–1954 | Succeeded by Alexander Gibson |
