= Charles Corri =

British conductor

Charles Montague Corri (22 June 1861 – 8 June 1941) was an English musician, conductor and arranger. He spent most of his career working for Lilian Baylis, as her musical director at the Old Vic Theatre, and then at Sadler's Wells Opera.

== Life and career ==
Corri was born in Walworth, London, the son of William Charles Cunningham Corri and Maria Louisa Pennal. He came from an Italian family of musicians who settled in Britain in the 18th century. Grove's Dictionary of Music and Musicians lists eight members of the Corri family active as musicians in Britain from 1771 onwards, which includes Domenico Corri, Sophia Corri Dussek, Philip Antony Corri, and Fanny Corri-Paltoni.

Corri married Martha Mayell in Liverpool in 1889. They had ten children

In 1898, Emma Cons, who ran the Old Vic Theatre, engaged him as musical director. At the same time she recruited her niece Lilian Baylis to help run the theatre. The Old Vic was operated on a small budget for the benefit of the local community in a poor area of London. By 1898, Cons had already begun to present regular operatic evenings, offering condensed versions of major operas, always sung in English. Corri was given the task of arranging the opera scores for the Old Vic's tiny orchestra. The Times wrote, "His masterpiece was said to be a transcription of Tristan for an orchestra of 13 players"; Baylis's biographer Elizabeth Schafer states that the Old Vic's orchestra comprised 18 players.

After Emma Cons died in 1912, Baylis obtained a licence allowing the Old Vic to stage full performances of operas. In the 1914–15 season, Baylis staged 16 operas and 16 plays (13 of which were by Shakespeare). Corri arranged and conducted the music for the operas, and all the incidental music for the plays. In the years after the First World War, Corri was praised for his conducting of Mozart operas, not as well known then as in recent times. His singers included established stars such as Clive Carey and Heddle Nash and up-and-coming singers including Winifred Lawson, Steuart Wilson and Joan Cross. In 1922, Corri conducted Grieg's incidental music for Peer Gynt when Ibsen's play received its British premiere at the Old Vic. The Times considered the music "extraordinarily well played by Mr. Corri and his orchestra".

In the 1930–31 season, Corri was joined by Lawrance Collingwood as his assistant conductor. In that season, Corri conducted The Force of Destiny, Cavalleria Rusticana, Pagliacci, Madame Butterfly, Lohengrin, Faust, Don Giovanni, Il trovatore, La bohème, Tannhäuser, and Hansel and Gretel; Collingwood conducted Carmen, The Marriage of Figaro and Tosca – continuing their policy of presenting opera in English. In January 1931, Baylis re-opened the newly rebuilt Sadler's Wells Theatre. For a time, opera was presented at both the Old Vic and Sadler's Wells. Corri and Collingwood were joined by guest conductors including Percy Pitt, Constant Lambert, Geoffrey Toye and Anthony Collins.

By the middle of the 1930s, the opera company had come to be based at Sadler's Wells. The orchestra was increased to 48 players. In the 1930s, Corri and the company presented standard repertoire works including operas by Mozart, Verdi, Wagner and Puccini, lighter works by Balfe, Donizetti, Offenbach and Johann Strauss, some novelties including operas by Holst, Ethel Smyth and Charles Villiers Stanford, and a staged version of Mendelssohn's oratorio Elijah.

Corri retired in 1935, and died at the age of 79 in June 1941.

== Notes ==
https://www.streathamsociety.org.uk/blogs--posts/charles-montague-corri

Cultural offices
Preceded by none	Music Director, Sadler's Wells; 1898–1935	Succeeded by Lawrance Collingwood
