= Stephen Arlen =

English theatre manager and operatic administrator

Arlen, circa 1968

Stephen Arlen (31 October 1913 – 19 January 1972) was an English theatre manager and operatic administrator. Originally an actor, he took up backstage work as a stage manager, and in the years after the Second World War was in charge of stage management at the Old Vic.

He was persuaded to join Sadler's Wells Opera as an administrator, and was the moving force behind the company's change of base from Sadler's Wells Theatre to the London Coliseum in 1968. He was seconded by Sadler's Wells to be adviser to the Théâtre Royal de la Monnaie in Brussels, and administrative director of the National Theatre in its early days.

== Life and career ==
Arlen was born Stephen Walter Badham, in Birmingham, the son of a comedian, Walter Cyril Badham, and his wife Annie Sophie née Earnshaw. At the age of 16 he started his stage career as an actor. He then switched to stage management, working backstage on such productions as George Robey's last West End show, a revival of The Bing Boys Are Here in 1934. In 1938, Arlen was stage manager for Bronson Albery's repertory company at the Phoenix Theatre, directed by Michel Saint-Denis, with stars including Peggy Ashcroft and Michael Redgrave in a wide range of plays from Ibsen to Shakespeare and Lorca.

During the Second World War, Arlen worked with ENSA in France, before joining the army. He rose from the ranks in The Buffs to a commission in the North Staffordshire Regiment. Towards the end of the war he was appointed production manager for Stars in Battledress. After the war, Arlen worked at the Old Vic, as stage manager for directors including Saint-Denis, Glen Byam Shaw and George Devine, and for Prince Littler at the London Coliseum. Norman Tucker, who was then running Sadler's Wells Opera persuaded Arlen to join him there. Their talents and characters complemented one another: the music critic Elizabeth Forbes recalled, "Tucker, a shy, reserved musician and scholar with a genius for administration", Arlen "his exact antithesis and complement … practical man of the theatre with just that tough epidermis that [Tucker] lacked."

In 1958, along with Tucker and the musical director, Alexander Gibson, Arlen resigned when the Sadler's Wells trustees proposed a merger with the Carl Rosa Opera Company that would have resulted in Sadler's Wells Opera abandoning its London home for most of the year. The proposal was withdrawn, and the three men agreed to withdraw their resignations.

Arlen was twice seconded from Sadler's Wells to help other theatres. In 1959, at the request of the Belgian government, he advised Maurice Huisman on the reorganisation of the principal Belgian opera house, the Théâtre Royal de la Monnaie in Brussels. In 1962, he was administrative director of the National Theatre in its early days.

In 1966, Tucker's health gave way and he was forced to retire. Arlen succeeded him as managing director of Sadler's Wells. He became, in the words of The Times, "the moving spirit in the transfer of the company from Sadler's Wells Theatre to the London Coliseum". He said that his principal aim was to give the company a home "where the members can stretch themselves, where it will be possible to develop on all fronts – singing, production and design."

Among the celebrated productions of the Arlen era were Wagner's The Mastersingers and Ring cycle conducted by Reginald Goodall, whom Arlen rescued from an obscure coaching post at Covent Garden to become, in the words of The Musical Times, "undoubtedly today's greatest Wagner conductor". The Times singled out "such exciting, if controversial, productions as The Damnation of Faust, Carmen and Tales of Hoffmann."

Arlen was twice married, first to Narice Ingram and secondly to the soprano Iris Kells, with whom he had a daughter. He was appointed CBE in 1968.

After a short illness, Arlen died of cancer at the age of 58.
