= Honor McKellar =

New Zealand mezzo-soprano (1920–2024)

Honor McKellar QSM
- Born: Winifred Honor McKellar; 10 November 1920; Dunedin, New Zealand
- Died: 2 February 2024 (aged 103); Alexandra, New Zealand
- Education: Royal Academy of Music
- Occupations: Mezzo-soprano opera singer, singing teacher
- Employer: University of Otago
- Known for: Teaching singers Jonathan Lemalu and Patrick Power

Winifred Honor McKellar QSM (10 November 1920 – 2 February 2024) was a New Zealand mezzo-soprano opera singer and singing teacher, and was the first full-time lecturer in singing at the University of Otago in Dunedin. Her students included Jonathan Lemalu, Patrick Power and Matt Landreth. In 1989, she was awarded a Queen's Service Medal for services to music, and in 2012, she was made a life member of the New Zealand Association of Teachers of Singing.

== Early life and education ==
Winifred Honor McKellar was born in Dunedin on 10 November 1920. Her mother was musical although McKellar does not recall hearing her sing. McKellar was taught piano by Miss Allen, and dancing by Dorothy Dean. At 16, she had her first singing lesson, from Dunedin musician Ida White.

McKellar graduated with a BA from the University of Otago in Dunedin in 1942 and a MusB in 1944. She would illustrate examples at the weekly public music class given by the head of the Music Department, Victor Galway. From 1946 to 1949, McKellar studied at the Royal Academy of Music in London. During her studies, she took part in the production of the opera The Poisoned Kiss by Ralph Vaughan Williams, which she regarded as her first proper stage experience.

McKellar said:

There were three of us who were mediums, not quite human, we were mythical. I remember being offered a chair and mistily replying 'we prefer to float about the ether' and there was a roar of laughter, and it hooked me on making people laugh. The next day Vaughan Williams bumped into me in the corridor and said, 'you're the girl who does things with the words'.

== Singing and teaching career ==
When McKellar returned to New Zealand she was one of the original singers for Donald Munro's New Zealand Opera Company. During the 1960s, she returned to the UK as a session musician, and sang in the Glyndebourne Chorus, Opera For All, and the John Alldis Choir, performing in the latter's choral accompaniment to Pink Floyd album Atom Heart Mother.

McKellar credits London-based singing teacher Roy Henderson teaching her the importance of "getting the meaning of music across by other means, concentrating on what the body was doing."

In 1971 McKellar returned to Dunedin where she became the university's first executant lecturer in singing, being appointed the William Evans lecturer. It was through McKellar's pressure that the Music Department appointed a full-time pianist, Maurice Till. McKellar retired from her lecturing position in 1985 but continued to teach both privately and at the university. She recalled one of the highlights of her time at the university as staging operas in Allen Hall, with Professor Peter Platt, that were meant for full-size opera houses, later saying "Some of them must have been hilariously bad!".

McKellar's students included Patrick Power, Jonathan Lemalu and Matthew Landreth.

== Personal life and death ==
McKellar was a resident of the Yvette Williams Retirement Village in Dunedin. She died in Alexandra on 2 February 2024, at the age of 103.

== Recognition ==
In the 1989 Queen's Birthday Honours, McKellar was awarded the Queen's Service Medal for community service. In 2012 she was made a life member of the New Zealand Association of Teachers of Singing (NEWZATS).

McKellar was the guest of honour at a Mothers' Day performance given by Lemalu in Dunedin in 2021. Lemalu has said of McKellar that he would not have a singing career without her: "I remember your boundless energy, patience, and instilling fun and joy in my music making. You always kept me grounded, you always kept me focussed ... every singing teacher subsequently is and was compared to you, my musical mother."

The university held a morning tea at their new Performing Arts Centre to celebrate McKellar's 100th birthday in November 2020.
