= Barry Mora =

New Zealand opera singer (1940–2021)

Reginald Barry Mora (15 November 1940 – 11 October 2021) was a New Zealand classical baritone who had an active international career in concerts and operas from the mid-1970s through the 1990s. Retired from the stage, he was a member of the board at The NBR New Zealand Opera.

== Early life ==
Mora grew up at Taikorea, near Palmerston North and attended Palmerston North Boys' High School.

== Career ==
Mora's career began with the New Zealand Broadcasting Service, followed by a job in the management of the New Zealand Symphony Orchestra. He had been studying singing and performing as a concert soloist and in opera. In the early 1970s, he moved to London to pursue his singing career.

Mora studied singing in London with Otakar Kraus. He was a member of the Gelsenkirchen Opera House from 1976 until 1980, where he became principal baritone. He made his professional debut as Anckarström in Giuseppe Verdi's Un ballo in maschera. In 1980 he joined the Frankfurt Opera House where he had a highly successful career for the next seven years singing roles in Verdi operas among others. From 1987 he worked as a freelance artist internationally with the Welsh National Opera, Covent Garden and at opera houses in Vancouver, Japan and Barcelona. Mora also performed as a guest artist with De Nederlandse Opera, the Edinburgh Festival, La Monnaie, the Scottish Opera, and Theater Aachen among others.

In 1990, Mora returned to live in New Zealand. He performed with opera companies in Canterbury, Wellington and Auckland. He performed roles with New Zealand Opera when he was well into his 70s: Sacristan in Tosca, and Benoît and Alcindoro in La Bohème.

== Personal life ==
Mora married Diane South, and they had two children.

Mora died on 11 October 2021, aged 80.

== Sources ==
- Mora at operissimo.com
