= New Zealand Association of Teachers of Singing =

Professional society in New Zealand

The New Zealand Association of Teachers of Singing, abbreviated NEWZATS, is an incorporated professional society in New Zealand. The society was launched in December 1988, and is based in Wellington.

In 2012 the Society granted life membership to Dunedin singing teacher Honor McKellar. On 22 September 2012 Emily Mair (1928–2021) also received a life membership in recognition of her "outstanding and sustained contribution and service in activities and roles directly or indirectly under the auspices of the New Zealand Association of Teachers of Singing". Other life members include Judy Bellingham, who was president of the association for six years, Elizabeth Bouman, Flora Edwards, and Janice Webb.

In 2017, Lisa Rangi was named President of NEWZATS.
