= Fernand Ansseau =

Belgian singer

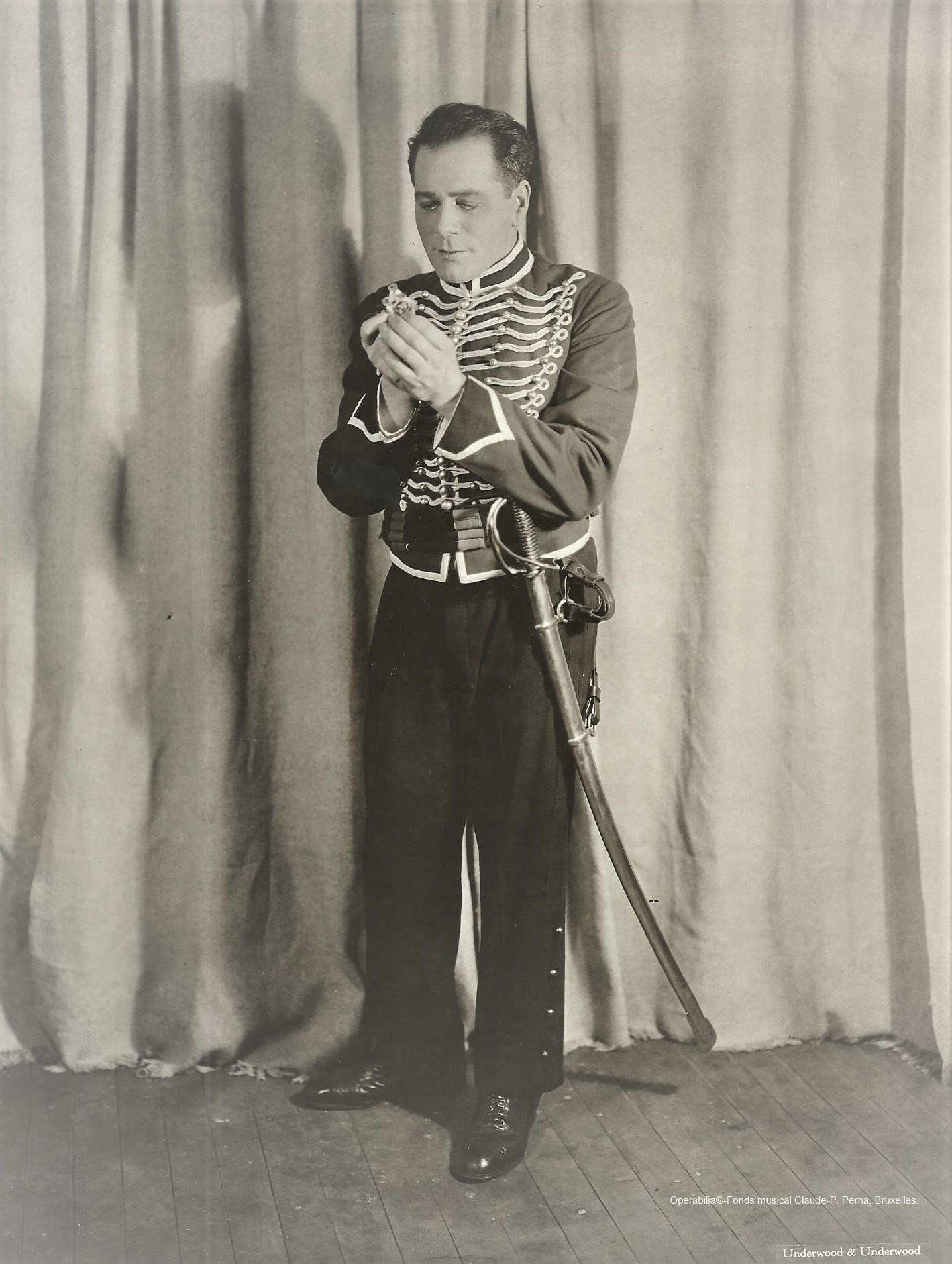

Background information
- Born: Fernand Ansseau; 6 March 1890; Boussu-Bois near Mons, Belgium
- Died: 1 May 1972 (aged 82) Brussels, Belgium
- Genre: Opera
- Occupation: lyric-spinto tenor

Fernand Ansseau (6 March 1890 in Boussu-Bois near Mons – 1 May 1972 in Brussels) was a Belgian lyric-spinto tenor.

== Early life ==
Fernand Ansseau was born 6 March 1890 in Boussu-Bois near Mons, Belgium, the younger son of the organist at St. Joseph's parish church. He first attended St. Joseph's Convent School. At age 7 he moved to the boys' school of St. Charles de Bousseau-Bois. While a student at St. Charles, Monsieur Tellier, one of his teachers, recognized his voice and occasionally had him sing short solos in the children's choir.

Upon leaving school Ansseau became a typographer, though he still sang in church. Monsieur Laurent, the local priest, encouraged him to join the choir of the Institut musical de Dour. On the advice of "kindly persons" he auditioned for Jean Vanden Eede, director of the Mons Conservatory, who admitted him to the class for solfeggio but not singing or piano. Discouraged, Ansseau considered abandoning his musical studies, but Monsieur Laurent encouraged him to apply to the Brussels Conservatory, where, at age 17, he was admitted and began to study voice "on trial" as a baritone with Désiré Demest. After two years of study Ansseau won only second prize, leading Lucien Solvay to write in L'Étoile belge, "the one who is perhaps the most promising has not been the best rewarded." Again discouraged, Ansseau considered returning to the printing trade. However, Demest, hearing the ease with which Ansseau sang high notes, came to realize Ansseau was a tenor, and, after three more years of study as a tenor, he won "a brilliant first prize." As a reward, the conservatory's director, Edgar Tinel, asked Ansseau to sing in a "communion mass" Tinel had composed for the heir to the Belgian throne, the Duke of Brabant. As a souvenir, King Albert I gave him a tie pin.

== Early career (1913–1918) ==
Ansseau made his debut in Dijon in 1913 as Jean in Massenet's Hérodiade. An unidentified critic wrote, "The great principal actor in this triumph is without doubt Fernand Ansseau...." Later in the 1913–1914 season he sang in Carmen, Sigurd, Faust, and Louise, among other works. In addition, he sang in the Dijon premiere of Les barbares by Saint-Saëns to great praise.

As a result of these successes, he received offers of engagements from many sources, but the eruption of World War I in August 1914 seriously threatened his career. During the war years, when Germany occupied Belgium, he gave many charity concerts and theatrical performances in Brussels and the provinces. On 21 December 1918, after the Armistice, he participated in the re-opening of the Théâtre royal de la Monnaie by singing the first act of Auber's La muette de Portici and Leoncavallo's Pagliacci.

== Later career (1919–1940) ==
In 1919 at La Monnaie he sang in Carmen, Manon, Louise, Pagliacci, Rigoletto, and Aïda, for a total of thirty-eight performances. On 21 May 1919 he made his Covent Garden debut in Manon with Louise Edvina, at which the audience called for encores of two sections. Later that season he performed Gounod's Faust with Nellie Melba, Miriam Licette, and Édouard Cotreuil, conducted by Albert Coates; Gounod's Roméo et Juliette, again with Melba and Dinh Gilly, with Beecham conducting; Tosca with Edvina; and other works already in his repertoire.

On 2 October 1920 he made his debut at the Opéra Comique in Massenet's Werther. Exactly a year later he sang the taxing tenor version of Gluck's Orfeo ed Euridice at the Opéra Comique under the baton of conductor Paul Vidal.

In 1922 Ansseau made his debuts at Cannes and Monte Carlo.

He appeared with the Chicago Civic Opera in the 1923–1924 through 1927–1928 seasons. It was in Chicago, in the 1923–1924 season, that he first sang the part of Prinzivalle in Henry Février's Monna Vanna. In the 1925–1927 season Ansseau participated in a cross-country tour that took him from San Francisco to Miami, by way of Los Angeles, Denver, Boston, Chicago, Philadelphia, Washington, Cleveland, Detroit, and Buffalo, appearing chiefly in Louise and Carmen.

In October 1923, with an opera company in San Francisco, he appeared in Samson and Delilah by Saint-Saëns with Marguerite D'Alvarez and Marcel Journet. At one of the performances he received twelve curtain calls after Act II. In the same 1923 season in San Francisco he also appeared in Tosca, Pagliacci, and Aïda.

At the end of 1928 Ansseau returned to Europe, where he appeared at Covent Garden, La Monnaie, the Paris Opera, and the theaters of Antwerp, Charleroi, Ghent, and Liège. After 1930 Ansseau decided not to travel abroad, and from then until the end of his career confined his activities to the principal Belgian and French opera houses. His last operatic appearances were in February 1939, at La Monnaie, in Pagliacci. His last public performance was at a gala concert at Frameries in the Borinage on 5 May 1940.

== Retirement ==
He refused to perform again during the German occupation of 1940, despite several appealing offers, notably from the Metropolitan Opera. He taught voice at the Brussels Conservatory 1942–1944 and was generous enough to create the "Prix Fernand Ansseau". Thereafter he spent a quiet retirement in Brussels, and passed away there on 1 May 1972 at age 82.

== Roles ==
Annseau performed twenty-nine roles in as many operas by nineteen composers.

His favorite operas were "Hérodiade because it was the opera in which I made my debut, Samson and Delilah because it has always been my war horse; and Tosca and Paillasse because it was in these two operas that I was fully able to appreciate my qualities of 'bel canto.'"

| Composer | Opera | Role |
|---|---|---|
| Alfano | Risurrezione | Dimitri |
| Auber | La muette de Portici | Masaniello |
| Berlioz | La damnation de Faust | Faust |
| Bizet | Carmen | Don José |
| Charpentier | Louise | Julien |
| Donizetti | La favorite | Fernand |
| Février | Monna Vanna | Prinzivalle |
| Gluck | Alceste | Admete |
| Gluck | Orfeo ed Euridice | Orfeo |
| Gounod | Faust | Faust |
| Gounod | Roméo et Juliette | Roméo |
| Leoncavallo | Pagliacci | Canio |
| Mascagni | Cavalleria rusticana | Turiddu |
| Massenet | Griseldis | Alain |
| Massenet | Hérodiade | Jean |
| Massenet | Manon | Des Grieux |
| Massenet | Werther | Werther |
| Montemezzi | L'amore dei tre re | Avito |
| Offenbach | The Tales of Hoffmann | Hoffmann |
| Puccini | Madama Butterfly | Pinkerton |
| Puccini | Tosca | Mario Cavaradossi |
| Reyer | Sigurd | Sigurd |
| Saint-Saëns | Les barbares | Rôle du veilleur |
| Saint-Saëns | Samson and Delilah | Samson |
| Verdi | Aïda | Radames |
| Verdi | La forza del destino | Alvaro |
| Verdi | Rigoletto | Duke of Mantua |
| Wagner | Lohengrin | Lohengrin |
| Wagner | Tannhäuser | Tannhäuser |

== Recordings ==
As of 13 March 2022 the Kelly Online Database lists 168 recordings made for His Master's Voice from 11 June 1919 through 5 June 1930.
