= Abhishek Majumdar =

Indian playwright and theatre director

- Born: Abhishek Majumdar
- Occupations: Stage director & playwright
- Years active: 2004–present

Abhishek Majumdar is an Indian playwright and theatre director.

He is the ex artistic director and founder of two theatre companies, Indian Ensemble and Bhasha Centre for Performing Arts, both based out of Bangalore. His plays include The Djinns of Eidgah and Pah-la, both of which have been staged in London. Other plays include Pratidwandi, Harlesden High Street, An Arrangement of Shoes, Afterlife of Birds, Rizwaan, Kaumudi, Dweepa, Muktidham, Baatin, Tathagat and Salt.
