= Lilian Baylis Technology School =

School in Lambeth, London, England

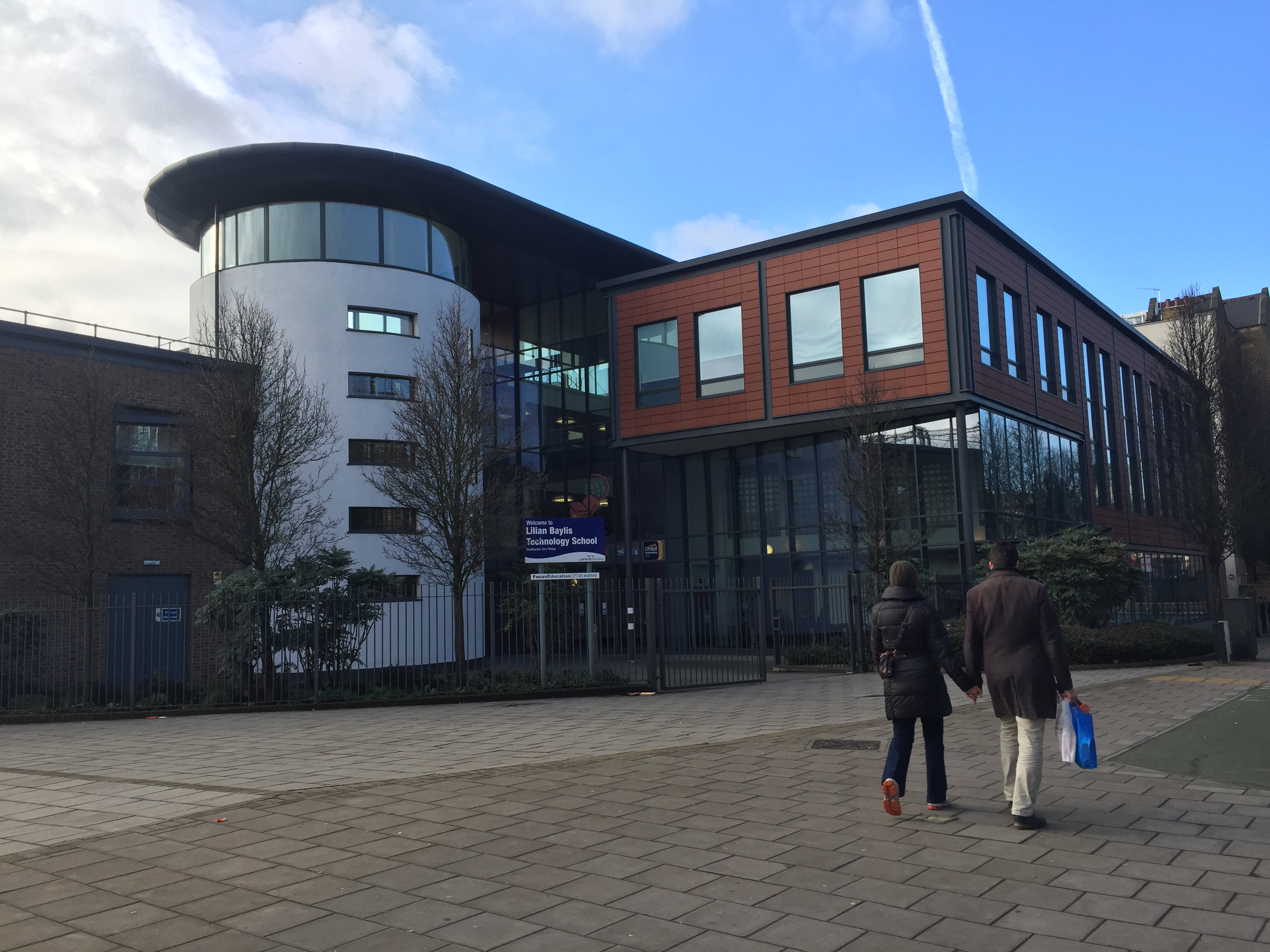
- Vauxhall; England

Information
- Type: Comprehensive
- Motto: Educate. Empower. Excel
- Established: 1983
- School board: Wyvern Federation
- Local authority: Lambeth Council
- Head teacher: Karen Chamberlain / Jason McInnis (1/1/27)
- Age: 11 to 18
- Language: English
- Affiliation: Wyvern Federation of Schools
- Website: lilianbaylis.com

The Lilian Baylis Technology School (LBTS) is a comprehensive school and sixth form for students from ages 11–18, in Kennington, London, England.

== History ==
The school is named after Lilian Baylis (1874–1937), a theatrical producer and manager who lived nearby in Stockwell. The school was formed from an amalgamation of Beaufoy School with Vauxhall Manor School for Girls in 1983.

It was originally based in purpose-built 1960s school buildings at Lollard Street, Kennington before moving to the current premises on Kennington Lane in 2005. The sixth form, LBTS6, opened its doors in September 2012.

== Organisation ==
LBTS is led by headteacher: Karen Chamberlain, Deputy Headteachers Jason McInnis and Declan McWilliams, and Assistant Headteachers Tom Pritchard, Mojisola Odusanya and Esther Akowe.

The school has a house system. Each student and teacher is put in one of four houses. These are Sapphire Sharks, Ruby Bears, Emerald Crocs and Amber Lions.

The Headteacher Karen Chamberlain has resigned her role and is expected to leave on the 1st January 2027, to be succeeded by Deputy Headteacher Jason McInnis permanently.
