= The Music Therapy Trust =

Organization

- Abbreviation: TMTTN
- Formation: 2005
- Headquarters: India: New Delhi; Nepal: Kathmandu
- Region served: India, Nepal
- Founder: Dr. Margaret Lobo, FRSA
- Main organ: Board of directors

The Music Therapy Trust is a registered charity in India founded by Dr. Margaret Lobo, who is also the founder and director of the Otakar Kraus Music Trust, UK. The trust provides music therapy to children and adults facing difficult psychosocial and physical challenges, especially those from poor sectors of the society. The trust is also planning to establish a professional body for recognizing qualified Indian music therapists, to be called the Indian Association of Professional Clinical Music Therapists.

The organization has its administrative headquarters in New Delhi, India, and Kathmandu, Nepal.

== History ==
The idea of The Music Therapy Trust was conceived by Lobo during her visit to India to give talks on music therapy in New Delhi and Mumbai. The trust was established in 2005 as a registered Indian society and became the first to introduce clinical music therapy network in India.

== Activities ==
=== The Music Therapy Academy ===
The Music Therapy Academy was launched in New Delhi to train Indian musicians by offering a year-long post-graduate diploma in clinical music therapy. The course is located in the Action For Autism's National Centre for Autism in Jasola Vihar and takes a new batch of students to train every year. It was launched by the famous cricketer Brett Lee, whose MEWSIC foundation is a partner in the programme.
