= English National Opera =

Opera company based in London

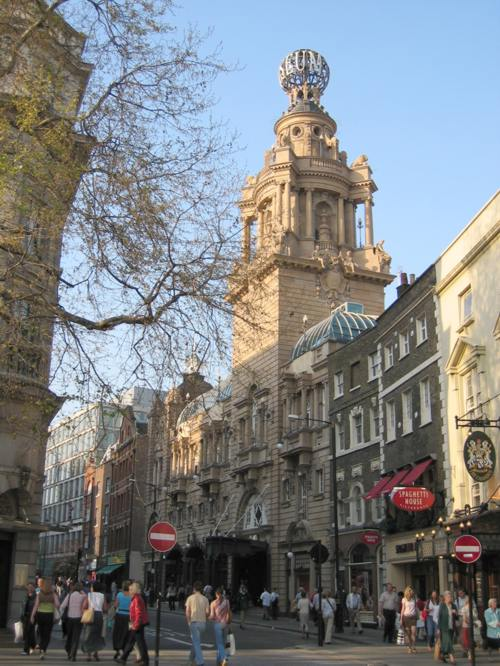
The London Coliseum, home of The English National Opera

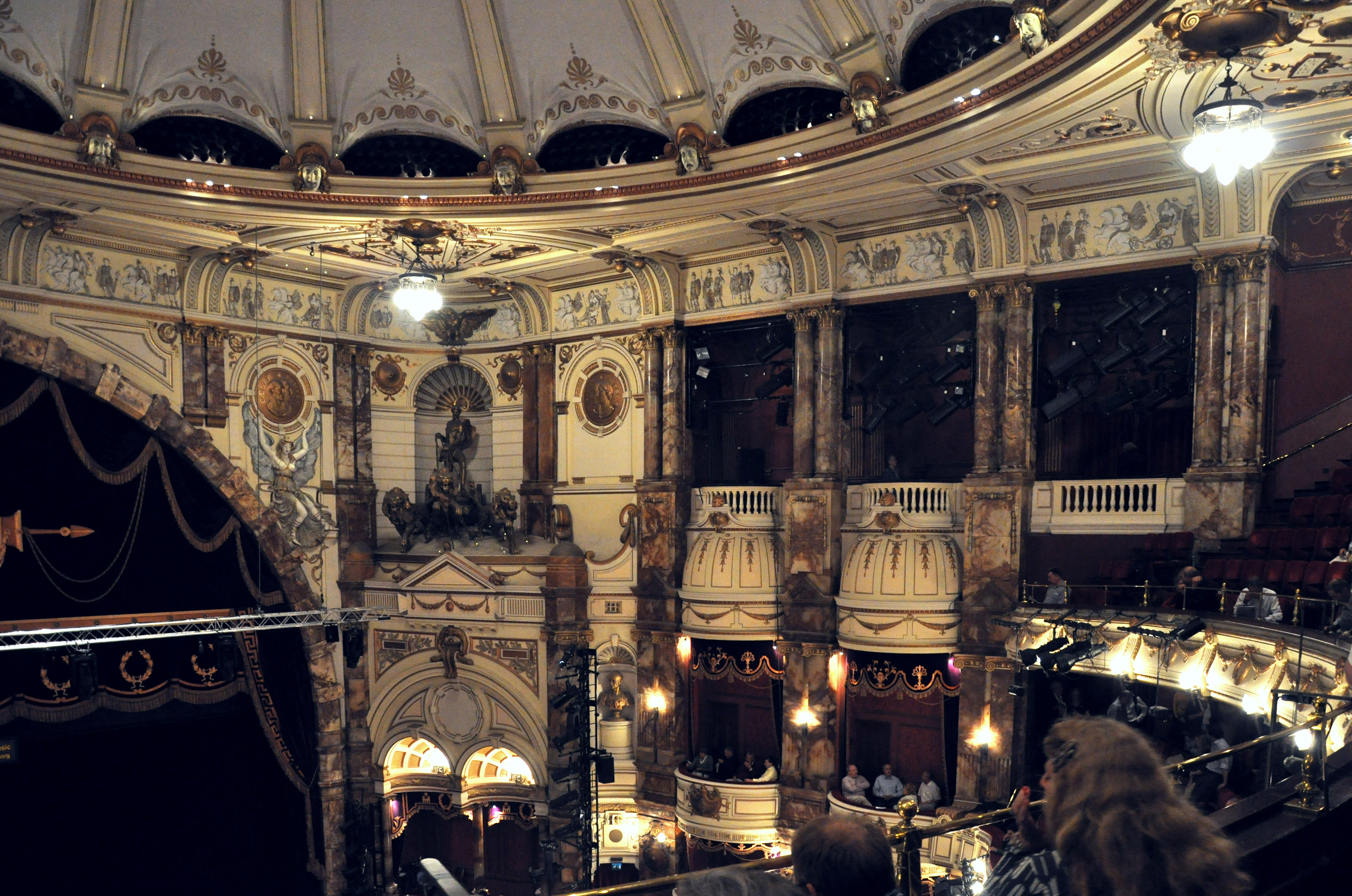
Detail of the interior of the London Coliseum, 2011

English National Opera (ENO) is a British opera company based in London, resident at the London Coliseum in St Martin's Lane. It is one of the two principal opera companies in London, along with The Royal Opera. ENO's productions are sung in English.

The company's origins were in the late 19th century, when the philanthropist Emma Cons, later assisted by her niece Lilian Baylis, presented theatrical and operatic performances at the Old Vic, for the benefit of local people. Baylis subsequently built up both the opera and the theatre companies, and later added a ballet company; these evolved into the ENO, the Royal National Theatre and The Royal Ballet, respectively.

Baylis acquired and rebuilt the Sadler's Wells theatre in north London, a larger house, better suited to opera than the Old Vic. The opera company grew there into a permanent ensemble in the 1930s. During the Second World War, the theatre was closed and the company toured British towns and cities. After the war, the company returned to its home, but it continued to expand and improve. By the 1960s, a larger theatre was needed. In 1968, the company moved to the London Coliseum and adopted its present name in 1974.

Among the conductors associated with the company have been Colin Davis, Reginald Goodall, Charles Mackerras, Mark Elder and Edward Gardner. The most recent music director of the ENO was Martyn Brabbins. Noted directors who have staged productions at the ENO have included David Pountney, Jonathan Miller, Nicholas Hytner, Phyllida Lloyd and Calixto Bieito. The ENO's current artistic director is Annilese Miskimmon. In addition to the core operatic repertoire, the company has presented a wide range of works, from early operas by Monteverdi to new commissions, operetta and Broadway shows.

== History ==
=== Foundations ===
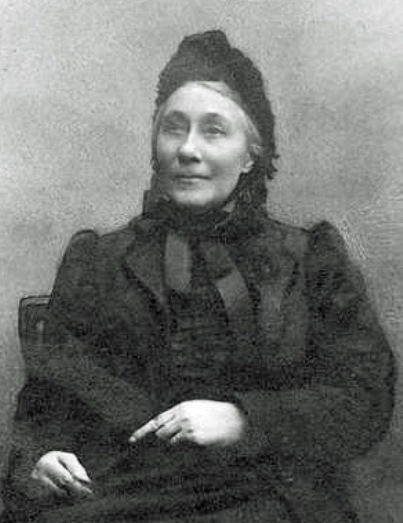
Emma Cons

In 1889, Emma Cons, a Victorian philanthropist who ran the Old Vic theatre in a working-class area of London, began presenting regular fortnightly performances of opera excerpts. Although the theatre licensing laws of the day prevented full costumed performances, (Note: The Old Vic was officially classed as a music hall, and was therefore not licensed to stage opera.) Cons presented condensed versions of well-known operas, always sung in English. Among the performers were noted singers such as Charles Santley. These operatic evenings quickly became more popular than the dramas that Cons had been staging separately. In 1898, she recruited her niece Lilian Baylis to help run the theatre. At the same time she appointed Charles Corri as the Old Vic's musical director. Baylis and Corri, despite many disagreements, shared a passionate belief in popularising opera, hitherto generally the preserve of the rich and fashionable. They worked on a tiny budget, with an amateur chorus and a professional orchestra of only 18 players, for whom Corri rescored the instrumental parts of the operas. By the early years of the 20th century, the Old Vic was able to present semi-staged versions of Wagner operas.

Emma Cons died in 1912, leaving her estate, including the Old Vic, to Baylis, who dreamed of transforming the theatre into a "people's opera house". In the same year, Baylis obtained a licence to allow the Old Vic to stage full performances of operas. In the 1914–1915 season, Baylis staged 16 operas and 16 plays (13 of which were by Shakespeare). (Note: The operas were: Carmen, The Daughter of the Regiment, Lucia di Lammermoor, Lohengrin, Faust, La traviata, Il trovatore, Rigoletto, Cavalleria rusticana and Pagliacci, Martha, Fra Diavolo, The Lily of Killarney, Maritana, The Bohemian Girl and Don Giovanni.) In the years after the First World War, Baylis's Shakespeare productions, which featured some of the leading actors from London's West End, attracted national attention, as her shoe-string opera productions did not. The opera, however, remained her first priority. The actor-manager Robert Atkins, who worked closely with Baylis on her Shakespearean productions, recalled, "Opera, on Thursday and Saturday nights, played to bulging houses."

=== Vic-Wells ===
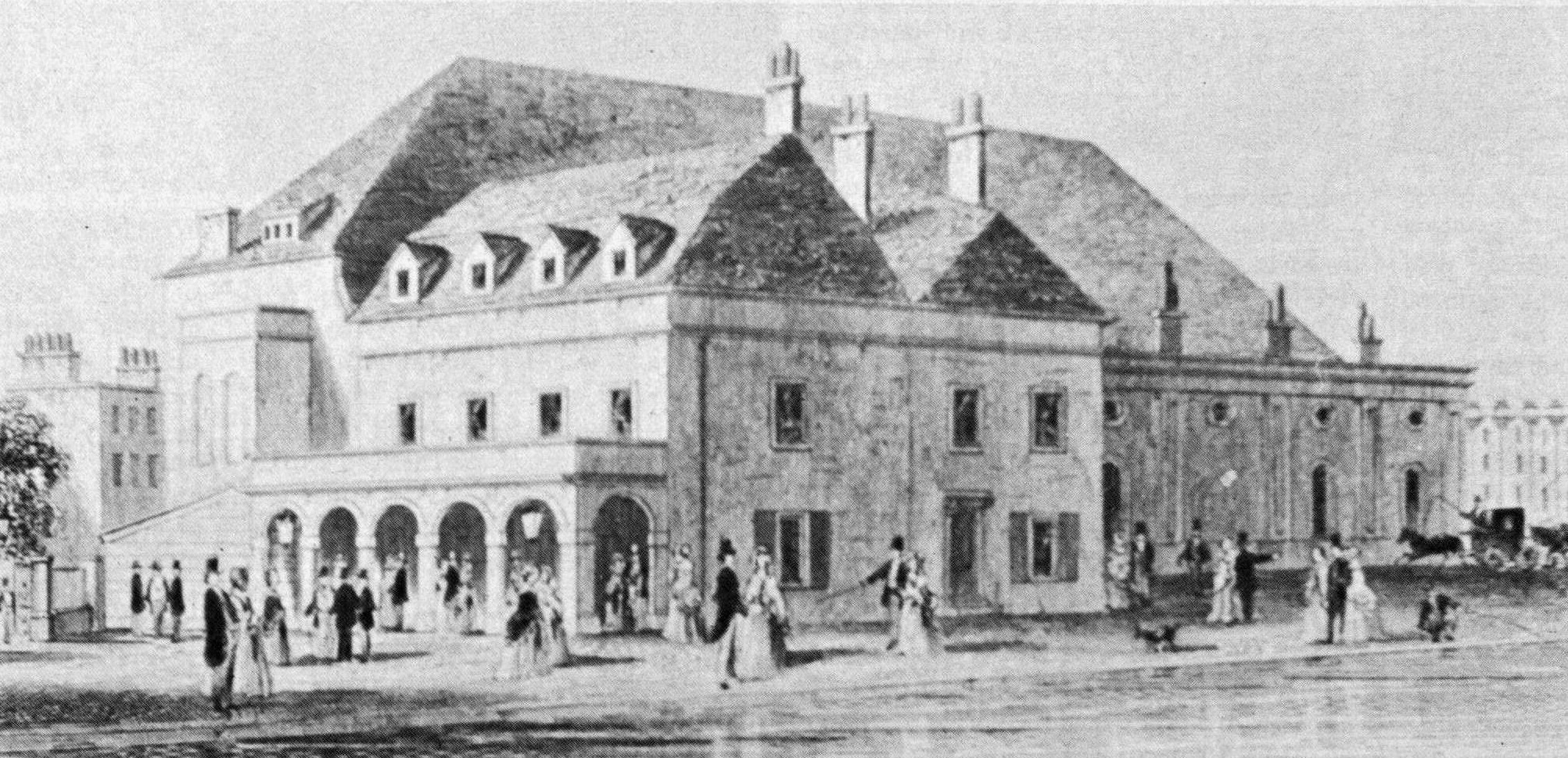
The old Sadler's Wells, demolished to make way for Baylis's theatre

By the 1920s, Baylis concluded that the Old Vic no longer sufficed to house both her theatre and her opera companies. She noticed the empty and derelict Sadler's Wells theatre in Rosebery Avenue, Islington, on the other side of London from the Old Vic. She sought to run it in tandem with her existing theatre.

Baylis made a public appeal for funds in 1925. With the help of the Carnegie Trust and many others, she acquired the freehold of Sadler's Wells. Work started on the site in 1926. By Christmas 1930, a completely new 1,640-seat theatre was ready for occupation. The first production there, a fortnight's run from 6 January 1931, was Shakespeare's Twelfth Night. The first opera, given on 20 January, was Carmen. Eighteen operas were staged during the first season.

The new theatre was more expensive to run than the Old Vic, as a larger orchestra and more singers were needed, and box office receipts were at first inadequate. In 1932, the Birmingham Post commented that the Vic-Wells opera performances did not reach the standards of the Vic-Wells Shakespeare productions. Baylis strove to improve operatic standards, while at the same time fending off attempts by Sir Thomas Beecham to absorb the opera company into a joint enterprise with Covent Garden, where he was in command. At first, the apparent financial security of the offer appeared attractive, but friends and advisers such as Edward J. Dent and Clive Carey convinced Bayliss that it was not in the interests of her regular audience. This view received strong support from the press; The Times wrote:

The Old Vic began by offering opera of some sort to people who hardly knew what the word meant ... under a wise, fostering guidance it has gradually worked upwards ...Any kind of amalgamation which made it the poor relation of the 'Grand' season would be disastrous.

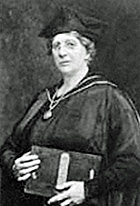
Lilian Baylis

At first, Baylis presented both drama and opera at each of her theatres. The companies were known as the "Vic-Wells". However, for both aesthetic and financial reasons, by 1934, the Old Vic had become the home of the spoken drama, while Sadler's Wells housed both the opera and a ballet company, the latter co-founded by Baylis and Ninette de Valois in 1930. (Note: The Times reported in 1933: "Experience in the previous season had shown that opera was more popular than drama at the Rosebery Avenue theatre and that the position was to some extent reversed at the Old Vic, where an audience faithful to Shakespeare had been built up over a period of many years.")

Lawrance Collingwood joined the company as resident conductor alongside Corri. With the increased number of productions, guest conductors were recruited, including Geoffrey Toye and Anthony Collins. The increasing success of the new ballet company helped to subsidise the high cost of opera productions, enabling a further increase in the size of the orchestra, to 48 players. Among the singers in the opera company were Joan Cross and Edith Coates. In the 1930s, the company presented standard repertoire operas by Mozart, Verdi, Wagner and Puccini, lighter works by Balfe, Donizetti, Offenbach and Johann Strauss, some novelties, among which were operas by Holst, Ethel Smyth and Charles Villiers Stanford, and an unusual attempt at staging an oratorio, Mendelssohn's Elijah.

In November 1937, Baylis died of a heart attack. Her three companies continued under the direction of her appointed successors: Tyrone Guthrie at the Old Vic, in overall charge of both theatres, with de Valois running the ballet, and Carey and two colleagues running the opera. In the Second World War, the government requisitioned Sadler's Wells as a refuge for those made homeless by air-raids. Guthrie decided to keep the opera going as a small touring ensemble of 20 performers. Between 1942 and the war's end in 1945, the company toured continuously, visiting 87 venues. Joan Cross led and managed the company, and also sang leading soprano roles in its productions when needed. The size of the company was increased to 50, and then to 80. By 1945, its members included singers from a new generation such as Peter Pears and Owen Brannigan, and the conductor Reginald Goodall.

=== Sadler's Wells Opera ===
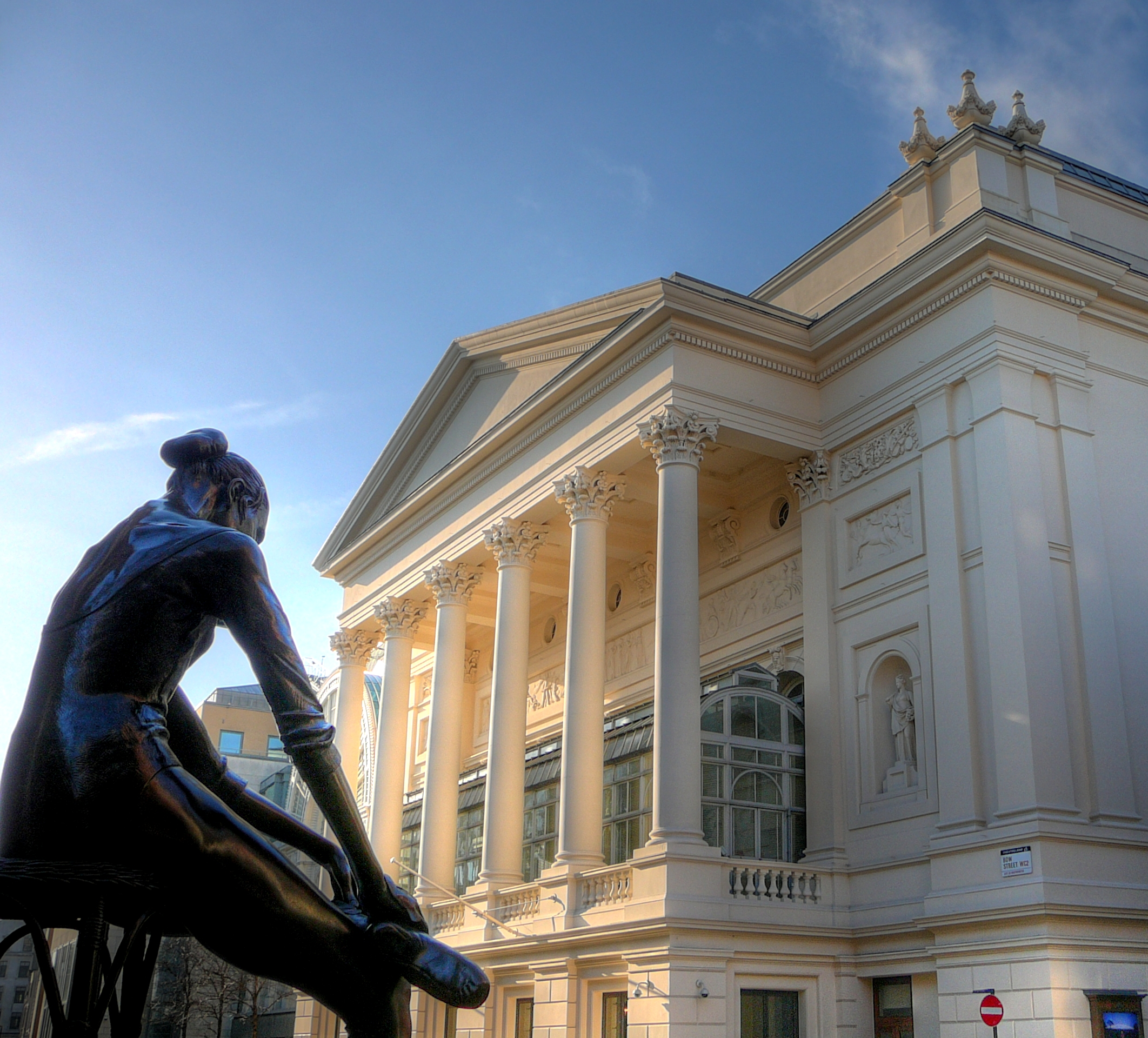
Covent Garden – rival and potential senior partner

Both Sadler's Wells and the Royal Opera House had presented no opera or ballet since 1939. The Council for the Encouragement of Music and the Arts (CEMA), the official government body charged with dispensing the modest public subsidy recently introduced, considered its options on the future of opera in Britain. CEMA concluded that a new Covent Garden company should be established, as a year-round, permanent ensemble, singing in English, instead of the shorter international seasons of pre-war years. This was a potential path to merge the two companies, as the modus operandi of the new Covent Garden company was now similar to that of Sadler's Wells. However, David Webster, who was appointed to run Covent Garden, though keen to secure de Valois' ballet company for Covent Garden, did not want the Sadler's Wells opera company. He considered Sadler's Wells to be a worthy organisation, but also "dowdy" and "stodgy". Even with a policy of singing in English, he believed that he could assemble a better company. The management of Sadler's Wells was unwilling to lose its company's name and tradition. It was agreed that the two companies should remain separate.

Divisions within the company threatened its continued existence. Cross announced her intention to re-open Sadler's Wells theatre with Peter Grimes by Benjamin Britten, with herself and Pears in the leading roles. Many complaints resulted about supposed favouritism and the "cacophony" of Britten's score. Peter Grimes opened in June 1945, to both public and critical acclaim; its box-office takings matched or exceeded those for La bohème and Madame Butterfly, which the company was concurrently staging. However, the rift within the company was irreparable. Cross, Britten and Pears severed their ties with Sadler's Wells in December 1945 and founded the English Opera Group. The departure of the ballet company to Covent Garden two months later deprived Sadler's Wells of an important source of income, as the ballet had been profitable and had since its inception subsidised the opera company. (Note: Although now based at Covent Garden, de Valois' company continued to be called the Sadler's Wells Ballet until it received the title "The Royal Ballet" in 1957.)

Clive Carey, who had been in Australia during the war, was brought back to replace Joan Cross and rebuild the company. The critic Philip Hope-Wallace wrote in 1946 that Carey had begun to make a difference, but that Sadler's Wells needed "a big heave to get out of mediocrity". In the same year, The Times Literary Supplement asked whether the Old Vic and Sadler's Wells companies would stick to their old bases, "or shall they boldly embrace the ideal of a National Theatre and a National Opera in English?" Carey left in 1947, replaced in January 1948 by a triumvirate of James Robertson as musical director, Michael Mudie as his assistant conductor and Norman Tucker in charge of administration. From October 1948, Tucker was given sole control. Mudie became ill, and the young Charles Mackerras was appointed to deputise for him.

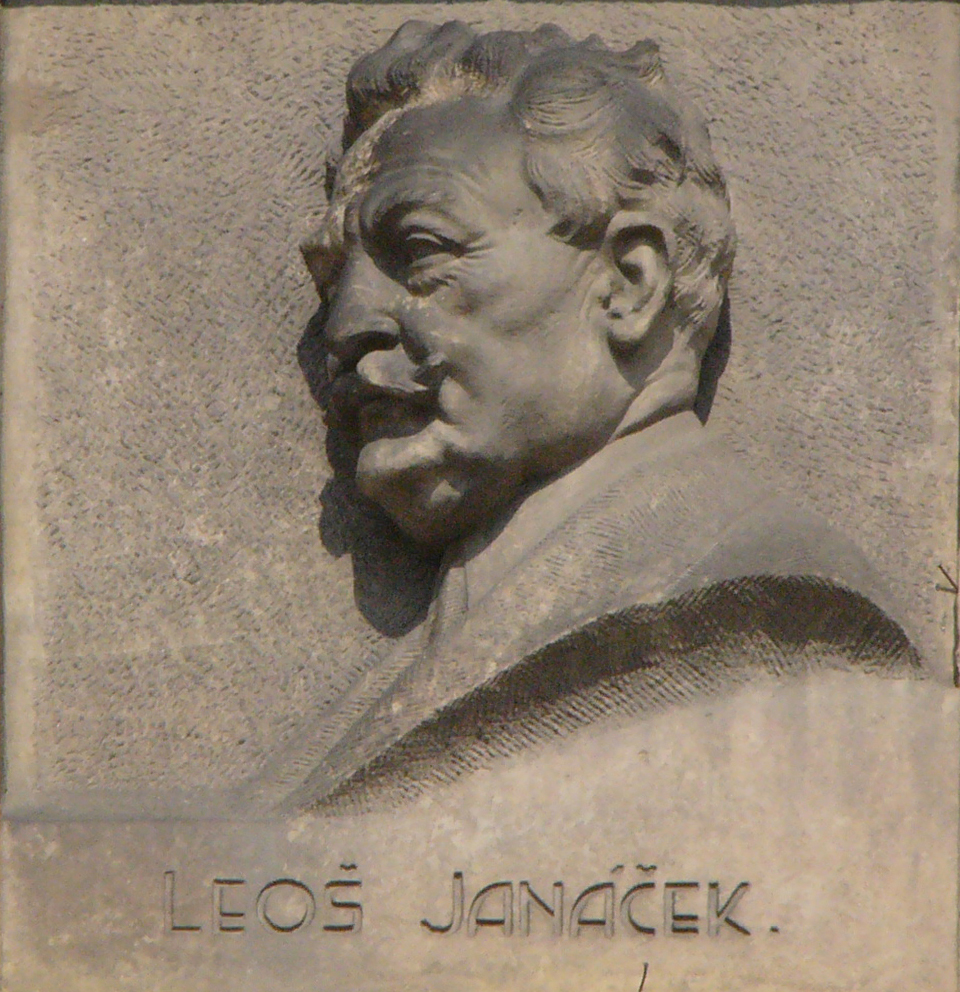
Janáček, championed by Charles Mackerras and the company

By 1950 Sadler's Wells was receiving a public subsidy of £40,000 a year, whilst Covent Garden received £145,000. Tucker had to give up the option of staging the premiere of Britten's Billy Budd, for lack of resources. Keen to improve the dramatic aspects of opera production, Tucker engaged eminent theatrical directors including Michel Saint-Denis, George Devine and Glen Byam Shaw worked on Sadler's Wells productions in the 1950s. New repertoire was explored, such as the first British staging of Janáček's Káťa Kabanová, at Mackerras's urging. Standards and company morale were improving. The Manchester Guardian summed up the 1950–51 London opera season as "Excitement at Sadler's Wells: Lack of Distinction at Covent Garden" and judged Sadler's Wells to have moved "into the front rank of opera houses".

The company continued to leave Rosebery Avenue for summer tours to British cities and towns. The Arts Council (successor to CEMA) was sensitive to the charge that since 1945, far fewer opera performances had been given in the provinces. The small Carl Rosa Opera Company toured constantly, but the Covent Garden company visited only those few cities with theatres big enough to accommodate it. In the mid-1950s, renewed calls appeared for a reorganisation of Britain's opera companies. There were proposals for a new home for Sadler's Wells on the South Bank of the Thames near the Royal Festival Hall, which fell through because the government was unwilling to fund the building.

Once again, there was serious talk of merging Covent Garden and Sadler's Wells. The Sadler's Wells board countered by proposing a closer working arrangement with Carl Rosa. When it became clear that this would require the Sadler's Wells company to tour for 30 weeks every year, effectively removing its presence on the London opera scene, Tucker, his deputy Stephen Arlen, and his musical director Alexander Gibson resigned. The proposals were modified, and the three withdrew their resignations. In 1960, the Carl Rosa Company was dissolved. Sadler's Wells took over some of its members and many of its touring dates, setting up "two interchangeable companies of equal standing", one of which played at Sadler's Wells theatre while the other was on the road.

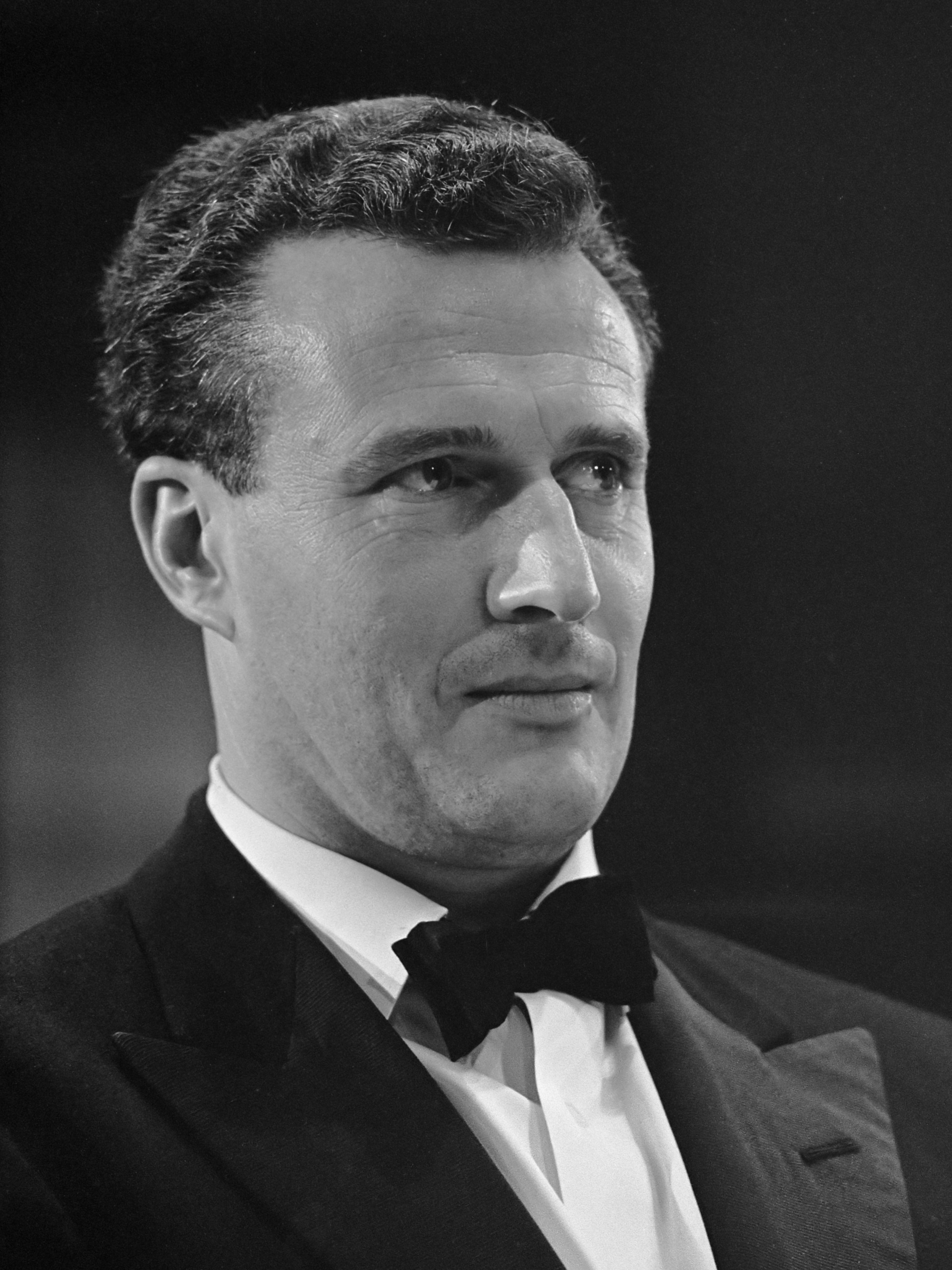
Colin Davis, musical director, 1961–65

By the late 1950s, Covent Garden was gradually abandoning its policy of productions in the vernacular; such singers as Maria Callas would not relearn their roles in English. This made it easier for Tucker to point up the difference between the two London opera companies. While Covent Garden engaged international stars, Sadler's Wells focused on young British and Commonwealth performers. Colin Davis was appointed musical director in succession to Gibson in 1961. The repertoire continued to mix familiar and unfamiliar operas. Novelties in Davis's time included Pizzetti's Murder in the Cathedral, Stravinsky's Oedipus rex, Richard Rodney Bennett's The Mines of Sulphur and more Janáček. Sadler's Wells's traditional policy of giving all operas in English continued, with only two exceptions: Oedipus rex, which was sung in Latin, and Monteverdi's L'Orfeo, sung in Italian, for reasons not clear to the press. In January 1962, the company gave its first Gilbert and Sullivan opera, Iolanthe, with Margaret Gale in the title role, on the day on which the Savoy operas came out of copyright and the D'Oyly Carte monopoly ended. The production was well received (it was successfully revived for many seasons until 1978) and was followed by a production of The Mikado in May of the same year.

The Islington theatre was by now clearly too small to allow the company to achieve any further growth. (Note: By the 1960s, the seating capacity of the theatre had shrunk from its original 1,640 to 1,497.) A study conducted for the Arts Council reported that in the late 1960s the two Sadler's Wells companies comprised 278 salaried performers and 62 guest singers. (Note: 44 principals on annual contracts, 62 guest singers, two choruses of 48, two opera-ballet dancing ensembles of 12, and two orchestras of 57 players.) The company had experience of playing in a large West End theatre, such as its 1958 sell-out production of The Merry Widow that had transferred to the 2,351-seat London Coliseum for a summer season. Ten years later, the lease of the Coliseum became available. Stephen Arlen, who had succeeded Tucker as managing director, was the primary advocate for moving the company. After intense negotiations and fund-raising, a ten-year lease was signed in 1968. One of the company's last productions at the Islington theatre was Wagner's The Mastersingers, conducted by Goodall in 1968, which 40 years later was described by Gramophone magazine as "legendary". The company left Sadler's Wells with a revival of the work with which it had re-opened the theatre in 1945, Peter Grimes. Its last performance at the Rosebery Avenue theatre was on 15 June 1968.

=== Coliseum ===
The company, retaining the title "Sadler's Wells Opera", opened at the Coliseum on 21 August 1968, with a new production of Mozart's Don Giovanni, directed by Sir John Gielgud. Though this production was not well received, the company rapidly established itself with a succession of highly praised productions of other works. Arlen died in January 1972, and was succeeded as managing director by Lord Harewood.

The success of the 1968 Mastersingers was followed in the 1970s by the company's first Ring cycle, conducted by Goodall, with a new translation by Andrew Porter and designs by Ralph Koltai. The cast included Norman Bailey, Rita Hunter and Alberto Remedios. In Harewood's view, among the highlights of the first ten years at the Coliseum were the Ring, Prokofiev's War and Peace, and Richard Strauss's Salome and Der Rosenkavalier.

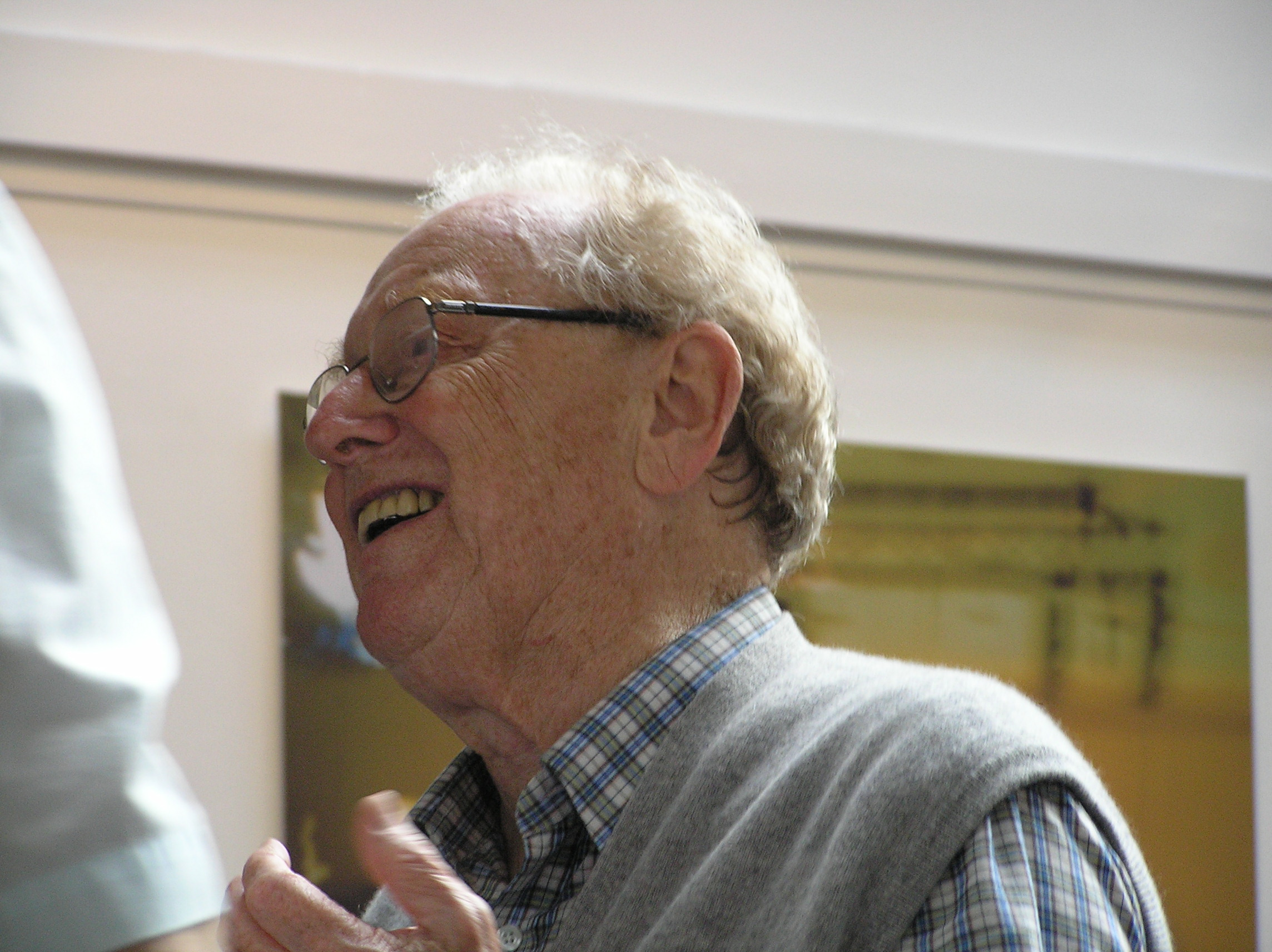
Charles Mackerras, musical director 1970–77

The company's musical director from 1970 to 1977 was Charles Mackerras. Harewood praised his exceptional versatility, with a range "from The House of the Dead to Patience." Among the operas he conducted for the company were Handel's Julius Caesar starring Janet Baker and Valerie Masterson; five Janáček operas; The Marriage of Figaro with pioneering use of 18th century performing style; Massenet's Werther; Donizetti's Mary Stuart with Baker; and Sullivan's Patience. The company took the production of the last to the Vienna Festival in 1975, along with Britten's Gloriana. (Note: Mackerras also conducted the company in performances of Gloriana and Patience at the Proms in London in 1973 and 1976 respectively.) Sir Charles Groves succeeded Mackerras as musical director from 1978 to 1979, but Groves was unwell and unhappy during his brief tenure. Starting in 1979, Mark Elder succeeded Groves in the post, and described Groves "immensely encouraging and supportive".

A long-standing concern of Arlen and then Harewood was the need to change the company's name to reflect the fact that it was no longer based at Sadler's Wells theatre. Byam Shaw commented "The one major setback the Sadler's Wells Opera Company suffered from its transplant was that unheeding taxi drivers kept on taking their patrons up to Rosebery Avenue".

Harewood considered it an elementary rule that "you must not carry the name of one theatre if you are playing in another one." Covent Garden, protective of its status, objected to the suggestion that the Sadler's Wells company should be called "The British National Opera" or "The National Opera", although neither Scottish Opera nor the Welsh National Opera opposed such a change. Eventually the British government decided the matter, and the title "English National Opera" was approved. The company's board adopted the new name in November 1974. In 1977, in response to demand for more opera productions in English provincial cities, a second company was established. It was based at Leeds in northern England, and was known as ENO North. Under Harewood's guidance, it flourished, and in 1981 it became an independent company, Opera North.

=== ENO ===
==== 1980–99 ====
In 1982, at Elder's instigation, Harewood appointed David Pountney director of productions. In 1985 Harewood retired, becoming chairman of ENO's board the following year. Peter Jonas succeeded Harewood as managing director. The 1980s leadership team of Elder, Pountney and Jonas became known as the "Powerhouse", (Note: Sometimes given as "Power House" or "Power house": see the title of the 1992 book by Jonas, Elder and Pountney, Power house: the English National Opera experience.) initiated a new era of "director's opera". The three of them favoured productions described, contrastingly, by Elder as "groundbreaking, risky, probing and theatrically effective", and by the director Nicholas Hytner as "Euro-bollocks that never has to be comprehensible to anybody but the people sitting out there conceiving." Directors who did not, in Harewood's phrase, "want to splash paint in the face of the public" were sidelined. A 1980s audience survey showed that the two things that ENO audiences most disliked were poor diction and the extremes of "director's opera".

In the Grove Dictionary of Music and Musicians, Barry Millington has described the 'Powerhouse' style as "arresting images of dislocated reality, an inexhaustible repertory of stage contrivances, a determination to explore the social and psychological issues latent in the works, and above all an abundant sense of theatricality." As examples, Millington mentioned

Rusalka (1983), with its Edwardian nursery setting and Freudian undertones, and Hansel and Gretel (1987), its dream pantomime peopled by fantasy figures from the children's imagination ... Lady Macbeth of the Mtsensk District (1987) and Wozzeck (1990) exemplified an approach to production in which grotesque caricature jostles with forceful emotional engagement.

Poor average box-office sales led to a financial crisis, exacerbated by backstage industrial relations problems. After 1983, the company ceased touring to other British venues. Assessing the achievements of the 'Powerhouse' years, Tom Sutcliffe wrote in The Musical Times:

ENO is not second best to Covent Garden. It is different, more theatrical, less vocal. ... The ENO now follows a policy like Covent Garden's in the early years after the war, when Peter Brook was scandalising the bourgeoisie with his opera stagings. The last two seasons at the ENO have been difficult, or at any rate sentiment has turned against the outgoing regime over the last nine months. Audience figures are well down. ... The presiding genius of the Elder years has, of course, been David Pountney. Not because his productions were all marvellous. Perhaps only a few were. But because, like Elder, he enabled so many other talents to thrive. (Note: Sutcliffe added, "once Pountney was really settled in, the list of special events season by season was huge. I thought all three of Elijah Moshinsky's ENO stagings, Ligeti's Grand macabre, Mastersingers, and Bartered bride, excellent: a pity Moshinsky came to feel out of place at the Coliseum. Of Pountney's own stagings the best for me were his exuberant Valkyrie, Doctor Faust, Lady Macbeth of Mtsensk, Hansel and Gretel, Falstaff, Macbeth, and The Adventures of Mr Broucek. In later revivals I came to appreciate his Queen of Spades, Cunning Little Vixen and Rusalka (though white Edwardian clothes became hackneyed). Graham Vick ... Ariadne on Naxos, Madame Butterfly, Eugene Onegin, Rape of Lucretia and Figaro's Wedding were all very convincing. David Alden proved for me a constant winner, from Mazeppa, to Simon Boccanegra, to Masked Ball, to Oedipus and Bluebeard, to Ariodante. I grew to love Miller's Mikado ... Nicholas Hytner's Xerxes and Rienzi were fabulous. ... Designers who were given their heads and delighted everybody included Stefanos Lazaridis, Maria Bjornsen, David Fielding, Richard Hudson, Nigel Lowery, Antony McDonald and Tom Cairns.")

Productions during the 1980s included the company's first presentations of Pelléas and Mélisande (1981), Parsifal (1986) and Billy Budd (1988). 1980s productions that remained in the repertory for many years included Xerxes directed by Hytner, and Rigoletto and The Mikado directed by Jonathan Miller. In 1984 ENO toured the United States; the travelling company, led by Elder, consisted of 360 people; they performed Gloriana, War and Peace, The Turn of the Screw, Rigoletto and Patience. This was the first British company to be invited to appear at the Metropolitan Opera in New York, where Patience received a standing ovation and Miller's production of Rigoletto, depicting the characters as mafiosi, was greeted with a mixture of enthusiasm and booing. (Note: The opera commentator Peter Conrad described Miller's production of Rigoletto as "decorative opera, as superficial as its clothes", but it was popular with audiences and was regularly revived between 1982 and 2006.) In 1990 ENO was the first major foreign opera company to tour the Soviet Union, performing the Miller production of The Turn of the Screw, Pountney's production of Macbeth, and Hytner's much-revived Xerxes.

The 'Powerhouse' era ended in 1992, when all three of the triumvirate left at the same time. The new general director was Dennis Marks, formerly head of music programmes at the BBC, and the new music director was Sian Edwards. Pountney's post of director of productions was not filled. Marks, inheriting a large financial deficit from his predecessors, worked to restore the company's finances, concentrating on restoring ticket sales to sustainable levels. A new production by Miller of Der Rosenkavalier was a critical and financial success, as was a staging of Massenet's Don Quixote, described by the critic Hugh Canning as "the kind of old-fashioned theatre magic which the hair-shirted Powerhouse regime despised".

Marks was obliged to spend much time and effort in securing the funding for an essential restoration of the Coliseum, a condition on which the ENO had acquired the freehold of the theatre in 1992. At the same time the Arts Council was contemplating a cut in the number of opera performances in London, at the expense of ENO, rather than Covent Garden. By increasing ticket sales in successive years, Marks demonstrated that the Arts Council's proposition was unrealistic. (Note: From 1993 to 1995, ticket sales rose from 49 per cent to 63 per cent.) After what The Independent described as "a sustained period of criticism and sniping at the ENO by music critics", Edwards resigned as music director at the end of 1995. Paul Daniel became ENO's next music director. In 1997, Marks resigned. No official reason was announced, but one report stated that he and the ENO board had disagreed about his plans to move the company from the Coliseum to a purpose-built new home. Daniel took over the management of the company until a new general director was appointed.

Daniel inherited from Marks a company thriving artistically and financially. The 1997–1998 season played to 75 per cent capacity and made a surplus of £150,000. Daniel led the campaign against yet another proposal to merge Covent Garden and ENO, which was rapidly abandoned. In 1998 Nicholas Payne, director of opera at Covent Garden, was appointed as ENO's general director. Productions in the 1990s included the company's first stagings of Beatrice and Benedict (1990), Wozzeck (1990), Jenůfa (1994), A Midsummer Night's Dream (1995), Die Soldaten (1996), Doctor Ox's Experiment (1998) and Dialogues of the Carmelites (1999). Co-productions, enabling opera houses to share the costs of joint enterprises, became important in this decade. In 1993 ENO and Welsh National Opera collaborated on productions of Don Pasquale, Ariodante and The Two Widows.

==== 2000–2009 ====
The aim must be to create a new audience that does not see opera as a middle class trophy art form: an audience that Payne was beginning to attract to the Coliseum.

— Director Tim Albery and colleagues, The Times, 18 July 2002

Operagoers want to hear great singing and orchestral playing presented in the context of a work's ethos rather than in some form only comprehended by the director.

— Critic Alan Blyth, The Times, 19 July 2002

Martin Smith, a millionaire with a finance background, was appointed chairman of the ENO board in 2001. He proved to be an expert fund-raiser, and personally donated £1M to the cost of refurbishing the Coliseum. He and Payne came into conflict over the effect on revenue of the "director's opera" productions that Payne insisted on commissioning. The most extreme case was a production of Don Giovanni directed by Calixto Bieito in 2001, despised by critics and public alike; Michael Kennedy described it as "a new nadir in vulgar abuse of a masterpiece," and other reviewers agreed with him. (Note: In The Independent, Edward Seckerson wrote, "It's been some time since I saw so much garbage on a stage. ... Bieito works so hard at trying to shock us that he succeeds only in boring us." Rodney Milnes called the production "yawn-inducingly tedious ... crass and irrelevant to ENO's function ... navel-gazing rubbish". In The Observer, Fiona Maddocks wrote, "It was all so boring ... truly dispiriting.) Payne insisted, "I think it's one of the best things we've done. ... It's exceeded my expectations." In the arts pages of The Financial Times, Martin Hoyle wrote of Payne's "exquisite tunnel vision" and expressed "the concern of those of us who value the true people's opera". Payne remained adamant that opera lovers who came to the ENO for a "nice, pleasant evening ... had come to the wrong place." The differences between Smith and Payne became irreconcilable, and Payne was forced to resign in July 2002. (Note: The gap between what Payne offered and what the public wanted was illustrated by letters in The Times on consecutive days: Tim Albery, Richard Jones, Jude Kelly, Phyllida Lloyd, Deborah Warner and Francesca Zambello, directors sympathetic to Payne, wrote: The aim must be to create a new audience that does not see opera as a middle class trophy art form: an audience that Payne was beginning to attract to the Coliseum. ... We deplore the loss of this courageous and visionary man. Doubtless Nicholas Payne will soon rise again on the British arts scene and where he does we will follow. But ENO and its audiences will be the poorer for his forced departure. Alan Blyth wrote: Nicholas Payne's employment of directors who are often seemingly more concerned to indulge their egos in reinterpreting the operas they have been invited to direct than in fulfilling the wishes of the librettist and the composer has been the main reason for falling attendance at the London Coliseum. ... operagoers want to hear great singing and orchestral playing presented in the context of a work's ethos rather than in some form only comprehended by the director.)

The successor to Payne was Séan Doran, whose appointment was controversial because he had no experience of running an opera company. He attracted newspaper headlines with unusual operatic events, described by admirers as "unexpected coups" and by detractors as "stunts"; a performance of the third act of The Valkyrie played to 20,000 rock music fans at the Glastonbury Festival. In December 2003, Daniel announced his departure from ENO at the end of his contract in 2005. Oleg Caetani was announced as the next music director, from January 2006.

In 2004, ENO embarked on its second production of Wagner's Ring. After concert performances over the previous three seasons, the four operas of the cycle were staged at the Coliseum in 2004 and 2005 in productions by Phyllida Lloyd, with designs by Richard Hudson, in a new translation by Jeremy Sams. The first instalments of the cycle were criticised as poorly sung and conducted, but by the time Twilight of the Gods was staged in 2005, matters were thought to have improved: "Paul Daniel's command of the score is more authoritative than could have been predicted from his uneven accounts of the previous operas." The production attracted generally bad notices. (Note: Reviewers' comments included: "the progress of Phyllida Lloyd's ongoing Ring Cycle for English National Opera has become almost painful to observe", "Miss Lloyd belongs to the school of opera directors who seem unable to cope with the epic grandeur of Wagner's concept", and "contains every cliche of 21st-century living".) The four operas were given individual runs, but were never played as a complete cycle.

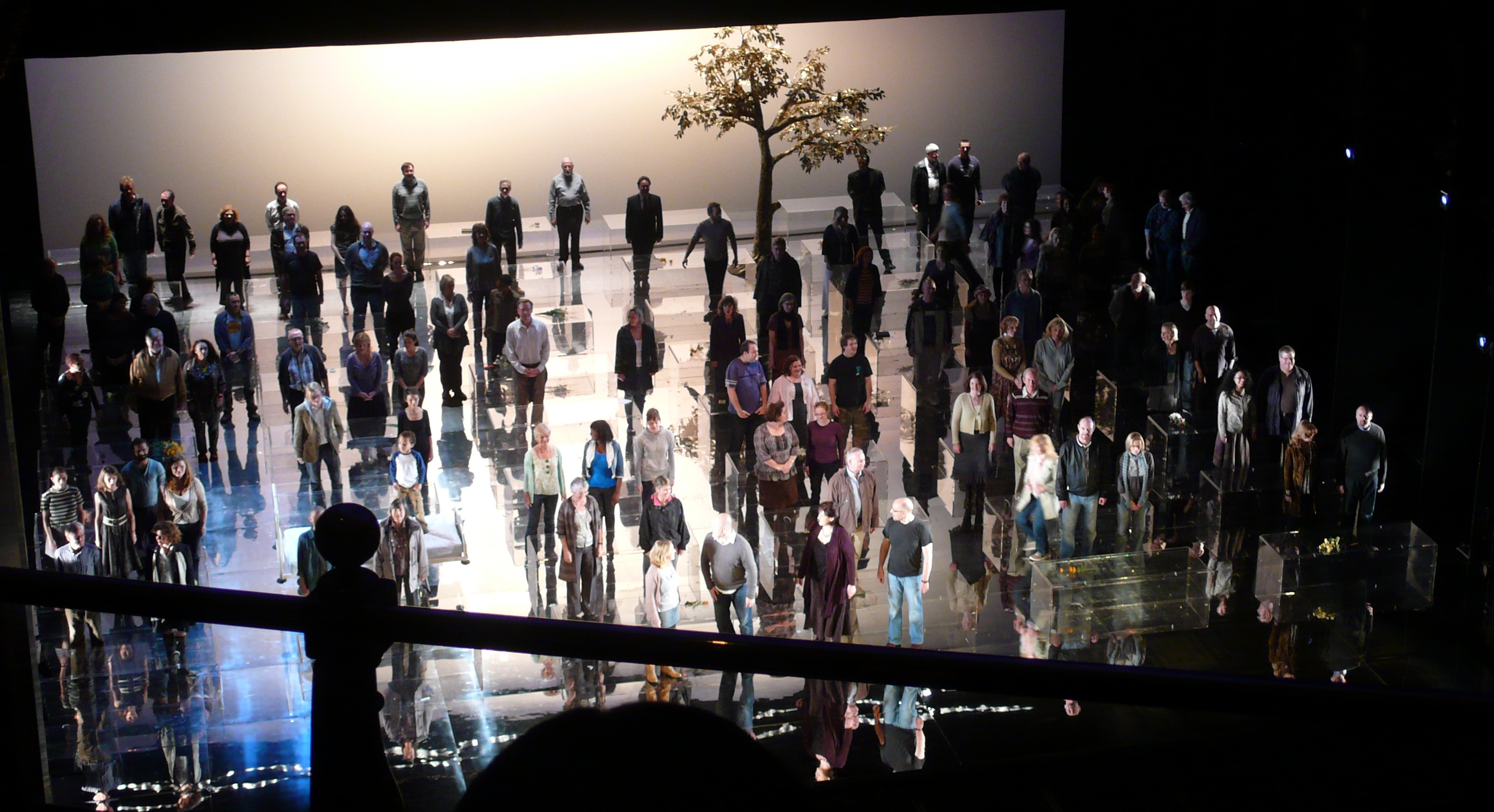
Messiah, staged in 2009

During the 2000s the company repeated the experiment, previously tried in 1932, of staging oratorios and other choral works as operatic performances. Bach's St. John Passion was given in 2000, followed by Verdi's Requiem (2000), Tippett's A Child of Our Time (2005) and Handel's Jephtha (2005) and Messiah (2009). ENO responded to the increased interest in Handel's operas, staging Alcina (2002), Agrippina (2006) and Partenope (2008). In 2003 the company staged its first production of Berlioz's massive opera The Trojans, with Sarah Connolly as "a supremely eloquent, genuinely tragic Dido".

In 2005, after an internal debate that had been going on since 1991, the ENO announced that surtitles would be introduced at the Coliseum. Surveys had shown that only a quarter of audience members could hear the words clearly. With a few exceptions, including Lesley Garrett and Andrew Shore, (Note: Shore expressed his strong disapproval of surtitles for vernacular performances, and in a 2010 production of The Elixir of Love he insisted that the surtitles should be switched off during his delivery of Dulcamara's patter song.) ENO singers of the 21st century were considered to have poorer diction than earlier singers such as Masterson and Derek Hammond-Stroud. (Note: In 1984 The New York Times had expressed surprise at the clarity of diction of the ENO company in the Metropolitan Opera House, more than half as big again as the Coliseum (3,800 seats compared to 2,358).) Harewood and Pountney had been immovably opposed to surtitles, as both believed that opera in English was pointless if it could not be understood. Harewood thought, moreover, that surtitles could undermine the case for a publicly funded opera-in-English company. The editor of Opera magazine, Rodney Milnes, campaigned against surtitles on the grounds that "singers would give up trying to articulate clearly and audiences would cease focusing on the stage". Despite these objections, surtitles were introduced from October 2005.

On 29 November 2005, Doran resigned as artistic director. To replace him, Smith divided the duties between Loretta Tomasi as chief executive and John Berry as artistic director. These elevations from within the organisation were controversial, because they were neither advertised nor cleared at the top level of the Arts Council. Smith received severe press criticism for his action, and in December 2005 he announced his resignation. In the same week, Caetani's appointment as the next ENO music director was cancelled. Berry was at first criticised in the press for his choice of singers for ENO productions, but the appointment of Edward Gardner as music director from 2007 received considerable praise. The Observer commented that Gardner was "widely credited with breathing fresh life into English National Opera".

Attendance figures recovered, with younger audiences attracted by ENO's marketing schemes. The company's finances improved, with £5M in reserve funds in April 2009.

==== 2010–present ====
Productions in the 2011 season continued the company's traditions of engaging directors with no operatic experience (a well-reviewed The Damnation of Faust staged by Terry Gilliam and set in Nazi Germany) and of drastic reinterpretations (a version of Britten's A Midsummer Night's Dream presented by Christopher Alden as a paedophile parable set in a 1950s boys' school, which divided critical opinion). In the 2012–13 season ENO introduced "Opera Undressed" evenings, aimed at attracting new audiences who had thought opera "Too pricey, too pompous, too posh". Operas advertised under this banner were Don Giovanni, La traviata, Michel van der Aa's Sunken Garden (performed at the Barbican) and Philip Glass's The Perfect American.

In January 2014, the ENO announced Gardner's departure as music director at the end of the 2014–15 season, to be succeeded by Mark Wigglesworth. At the time, the ENO had accumulated an £800,000 deficit, exacerbated by reductions in public subsidy; The Times commented that the incoming music director had a reputation for "steely, even abrasive determination" and that he would need it. From late 2014 the company went through a further organisational crisis. The chairman, Martyn Rose, resigned after two years in the post, following irreconcilable differences with Berry. Henriette Götz, the company's executive director, who had a series of public disagreements with Berry, resigned soon after. In February 2015, the Arts Council of England announced the unprecedented step of removing ENO from the national portfolio of 670 arts organisations that receive regular funding, and instead offered "special funding arrangements" because of continuing concerns over ENO's business plan and management. The council recognised that the company was "capable of extraordinary artistic work", but "we have serious concerns about their governance and business model and we expect them to improve or they could face removal of funding." In March 2015 Cressida Pollock, a management consultant, was named the interim CEO of ENO. In July 2015, Berry resigned as artistic director of ENO.

Critical and box-office successes in the company's 2014–2015 season included The Mastersingers, which won an Olivier Award for best new opera production, and Sweeney Todd, with Bryn Terfel in the title role. New productions announced for 2015–2016 were Tristan and Isolde, with sets by Anish Kapoor; the company's first staging of Norma; and the first London performance for 30 years of Akhnaten.

In September 2015, Pollock was elevated to formal full-time status as CEO for an additional three years, along with the formalised full appointment of Harry Brünjes as chairman of the ENO. Shortly into his tenure, he expressed his disapproval of proposals by the ENO management for economising measures such as a reduction in the contract of the ENO chorus. On 27 February 2016 the ENO chorus had voted to take industrial action in protest at newly proposed contract reductions, but industrial action was averted on 18 March 2016 after a newly negotiated proposal, at a different level of reduced salary, was reached. In general protest at his view of the situation at ENO, Wigglesworth announced his resignation on 22 March 2016 from the ENO music directorship, effective at the end of the 2015–2016 season.

On 29 April 2016, the ENO appointed Daniel Kramer as its new artistic director, effective 1 August 2016, Kramer's first appointment as director of an opera company. On 21 October 2016, the ENO announced the appointment of Martyn Brabbins as its next music director, with immediate effect, with an initial contract through October 2020. In September 2017, the ENO announced that Pollock is to stand down as its chief executive in June 2018. In March 2018, ENO announced the appointment of Stuart Murphy as its next chief executive, effective 3 April 2018. In April 2019, ENO announced the resignation of Kramer as its artistic director, effective at the end of July 2019. In October 2019, ENO announced the appointment of Annilese Miskimmon as its next artistic director, effective September 2020. In October 2022, ENO announced that Stuart Murphy would leave the company as Chief Executive in September 2023.

In December 2018, ENO started offering free balcony tickets for Under 18s on Saturdays in an attempt to engage more young people with the opera. This scheme was expanded to Under 21s in 2021 to cover performances throughout the week, with free seats in all parts of the audiotorium.

In November 2022, Arts Council England removed ENO from its National Portfolio, effectively cutting its income by £12.5 million a year. ENO initially responded with a statement that it was looking forward to 'creating a new base out of London, potentially in Manchester' in line with suggestions by the Arts Council. ENO later shared a petition to have its funding reinstated and to retain its London base at The London Coliseum. In January 2023, ACE and ENO released a joint statement that funding had been reinstated through to 2024, with an aim to "sustain a programme of work at the ENO’s home the London Coliseum, and at the same time help the ENO start planning for a new base outside London by 2026." In October 2023, Martyn Brabbins resigned as music director of ENO, with immediate effect, in protest at proposed personnel reductions to the company's music staff. Two months later, ENO announced the planned establishment of a "main base" in Greater Manchester by 2029.

Jenny Mollica became interim chief executive officer (CEO) of the company in August 2023. In May 2024, ENO elevated Mollica to the post of its full CEO with immediate effect. In May 2025, ENO announced the appointment of André de Ridder as its next music director, effective with the 2027-2028 season, and with the title of music director-designate as of September 2025. In November 2025, ENO announced that Mollica is to stand down as its CEO in the summer of 2026.

== Repertoire ==
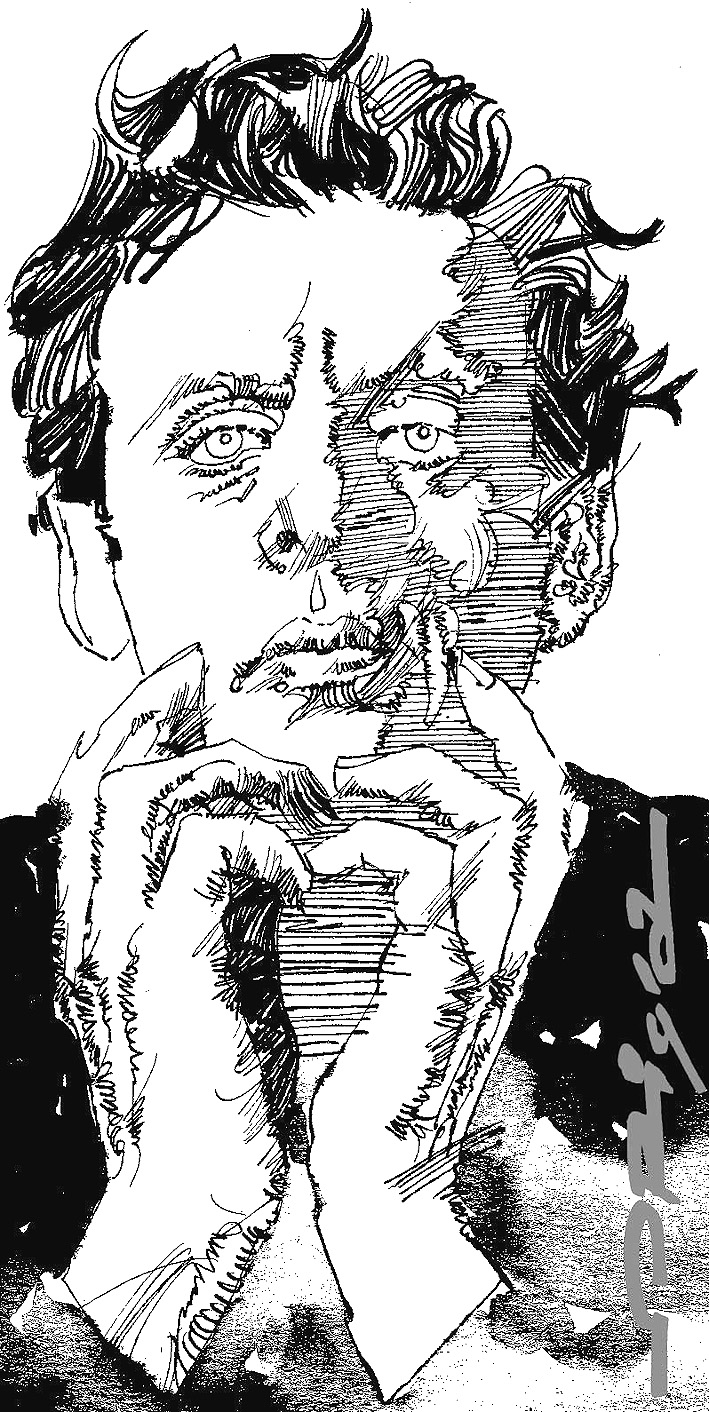
ENO has presented and premiered several Philip Glass operas

The company has aimed to present the standard operatic repertoire, sung in English, and has staged all the major operas of Mozart, Wagner and Puccini, and a wide range of Verdi's operas. Under Mackerras and his successors the Czech repertoire has featured strongly, and a broad range of French and Russian operas has been presented. The company has for decades laid stress on opera as drama, and has avoided operas where vocal display takes precedence over musical and dramatic content. In addition to the operatic staples, ENO has a history of presenting new works, and latterly of commissioning them.

=== Commissions and premieres ===
ENO has commissioned more than a dozen operas by composers including Gordon Crosse, Iain Hamilton, Jonathan Harvey, Alfred Schnittke, Gavin Bryars, David Sawer, Asian Dub Foundation and Nico Muhly. The company's best known world premiere was Peter Grimes in 1945. Subsequent world premieres have included The Mines of Sulphur (1965), The Mask of Orpheus (1986), The Silver Tassie (1999), and works by Malcolm Williamson, Iain Hamilton, David Blake, Robin Holloway, Julian Anderson and Stephen Oliver. British stage premieres include operas by Verdi (Simon Boccanegra, 1948), Janáček (Káťa Kabanová, 1951), Stravinsky (Oedipus rex, 1960), Prokofiev (War and Peace, 1972) and Philip Glass (Akhnaten, 1985, among others).

=== Operetta and musicals ===
From the beginning, the company interspersed serious opera with lighter works. In the early years the "Irish Ring" (The Bohemian Girl, The Lily of Killarney and Maritana) featured in Old Vic and Sadler's Wells seasons. After the Second World War, the company began to programme operetta, including The Merry Widow (1958), Die Fledermaus (1958), Orpheus in the Underworld (1960), Merrie England (1960), La Vie parisienne (1961), La belle Hélène (1963), and The Gipsy Baron (1964).

The company has produced most of Gilbert and Sullivan's Savoy operas. After the successful Iolanthe and The Mikado in 1962 and Patience in 1969, the last much revived in the UK, the U.S. and on the continent, a second production of The Mikado in 1986 starred the comedian Eric Idle in a black-and-white setting moved to a 1920s English seaside hotel. (Note: The production was directed by Jonathan Miller, despite his declared "contempt for Gilbert and Sullivan ... boring, self-satisfied English drivel.") It has been regularly revived over 25 years. A 1992 production of Princess Ida directed by Ken Russell was a critical and box office disaster, ran briefly, and was not revived. The Pirates of Penzance was produced in 2005. A highly coloured production of The Gondoliers opened in 2006; the press pointed out that the company's diction had declined to the point that the recently introduced surtitles were essential. In 2015 the film director Mike Leigh directed a new production of The Pirates of Penzance; the critical consensus was disappointment that Leigh had chosen one of the supposedly weaker operas in the Savoy canon, but the show provided a box-office hit. The cinema live broadcast of the production broke all previous box-office records for UK opera cinema-event releases. Cal McCrystal directed Iolanthe (2018) and H.M.S. Pinafore (2021). The company produced The Yeomen of the Guard in 2022.

From the 1980s the company has experimented with Broadway shows, including Pacific Overtures (1987), Street Scene (1989), On the Town (2005), Kismet (2007), and Candide (2008). In many of ENO's lighter shows, the size of the Coliseum has been a problem, both in putting across pieces written for much more intimate theatres and in selling enough tickets. In 2015 a new business plan for the ENO included making money from a West End musical partnership with the impresarios Michael Grade and Michael Linnit.

== Recordings ==
Recordings of individual scenes and numbers were made by Sadler's Wells singers from the company's earliest days. In 1972 an LP set was issued bringing together many of these recordings, prefaced with a tribute to Lilian Baylis recorded in 1936. Among the singers in the set are Joan Cross, Heddle Nash, Edith Coates, Joan Hammond, Owen Brannigan, Peter Pears, Peter Glossop and Charles Craig. The conductors include Lawrance Collingwood, Reginald Goodall and Michael Mudie.

After the Second World War, the Sadler's Wells company made a 78 r.p.m. set of excerpts from Simon Boccanegra (1949), but made no more recordings until the stereo LP era. In the 1950s and 1960s, the company recorded a series of abridged sets of operas and operettas for EMI, each occupying two LP sides. All were sung in English. The opera sets were Madame Butterfly (1960), Il trovatore (1962), and Hansel and Gretel (1966). The abridged operetta recordings were Die Fledermaus (1959), The Merry Widow (1959), The Land of Smiles (1960), La vie parisienne (1961), Orpheus in the Underworld (1960), Iolanthe (1962), La belle Hélène (1963) and The Gypsy Baron (1965). A complete recording of The Mikado was released in 1962.

Excerpts from the company's Twilight of the Gods were recorded in German under Mackerras (1972) and in English under Goodall (1973). EMI recorded the complete Ring cycle during public performances at the Coliseum between 1973 and 1977. (Note: The Rhinegold: 10, 19, 25 and 29 March 1975; The Valkyrie: 18, 20 and 23 December 1975; Siegfried: 2, 8 and 21 August 1973; Twilight of the Gods: 6, 13 and 27 August 1977) Chandos Records has since reissued the cycle on CD, and also produced the first official release of a live 1968 recording of the company's The Mastersingers, in a 2008 release.

In the CD era, ENO was featured as part of a series of operatic recordings, sung in English, released by Chandos Records. Some were reissues of Sadler's Wells Opera or ENO recordings originally issued by EMI: Mary Stuart (recorded in 1982) and Julius Caesar (1985), both starring Janet Baker, and La traviata (1981), starring Valerie Masterson. Newer recordings, made specifically for the Chandos series, whilst having no official connection with the ENO, featured many past and present members of the company. Conductors include Sir Charles Mackerras, Sir Mark Elder and Paul Daniel. Those in which the chorus and orchestra of the ENO appear are Lulu, The Makropoulos Affair, Werther, Dialogues of the Carmelites, The Barber of Seville, Rigoletto, Ernani, Otello and Falstaff, as well as the live recordings of The Ring and The Mastersingers.

== Education ==
In 1966, under the company's head of design, Margaret Harris, Sadler's Wells Theatre Design Course was founded; it later became Motley Theatre Design Course. ENO Baylis, founded in 1985, is the education department of the ENO; it aims to introduce new audiences to opera and "to deepen and enrich the experience of current audiences in an adventurous, creative and engaging manner." The programme offers training for students and young professionals, and also workshops, commissions, talks and debates, which is now called ENO Engage.

== Musical directors ==
- Charles Corri (1898–1935)
- Lawrance Collingwood (chief conductor, 1931–1941, musical director 1941–1946)
- James Robertson (1946–1954)
- Alexander Gibson (1957–1959)
- Colin Davis (1961–1965)
- Mario Bernardi (1966–1968) and Bryan Balkwill (1966–1969), joint musical directors
- Charles Mackerras (1970–1977)
- Sir Charles Groves (1978–1979)

== Music directors ==
- Mark Elder (1979–1993)
- Sian Edwards (1993–1995)
- Paul Daniel (1997–2005)
- Edward Gardner (2007–2015)
- Mark Wigglesworth (2015–2016)
- Martyn Brabbins (2016–2023)
- André de Ridder (designate, effective autumn 2027)

== Artistic directors ==
- John Berry (2005–2015)
- Daniel Kramer (2016–2020)
- Annilese Miskimmon (2020–present)

== Notes, references and sources ==
=== Sources ===
- Banks, Paul (2000). The Making of Peter Grimes: Essays and Studies. Woodbridge: Boydell Press. ISBN 0-85115-791-2.
- Blyth, Alan (1972). Colin Davis. London: Ian Allan. OCLC 641971554.
- Chandos Records (2009). Chandos catalogue 2009 (PDF). London: Chandos Records. Archived from the original (PDF) on 22 August 2011.
- Conrad, Peter (1987). A Song of Love and Death – The Meaning of Opera. London: Chatto and Windus. ISBN 0-7011-3274-4.
- Cox, David (1980). The Henry Wood Proms. London: BBC. ISBN 0-563-17697-0.
- Gilbert, Susie (2009). Opera for Everybody: The Story of English National Opera. London: Faber and Faber. ISBN 978-0-571-22493-7.
- Goodman, Lord; Lord Harewood (1969). A Report on Opera and Ballet in the United Kingdom, 1966–69. London: Arts Council of Great Britain. OCLC 81272.
- Haltrecht, Montague (1975). The Quiet Showman: Sir David Webster and the Royal Opera House. London: Collins. ISBN 0-00-211163-2.
- Jonas, Peter; Mark Elder; David Pountney (1992). Power house: the English National Opera experience. London: Lime Tree. ISBN 0-413-45631-5.
- Schafer, Elizabeth (2006). Lilian Baylis: A Biography. Hatfield: University of Hertfordshire Press. ISBN 1-902806-64-6.
