= Lilian Baylis =

English theatrical producer and manager

Lilian Baylis CH
- Baylis in 1924
- Born: Lilian Mary Baylis; 9 May 1874; Marylebone, London, England
- Died: 25 November 1937 (aged 63); Lambeth, London
- Resting place: East London Cemetery
- Occupations: Theatrical producer and manager
- Known for: Revived Old Vic and Sadler's Wells Theatre. Founded forerunners of English National Opera, National Theatre and Royal Ballet.

Lilian Mary Baylis (9 May 1874 – 25 November 1937) was an English theatrical producer and manager. She managed the Old Vic and Sadler's Wells theatres in London and ran an opera company, which became the English National Opera (ENO); a theatre company, which evolved into the English National Theatre; and a ballet company, which eventually became The Royal Ballet.

== Early life ==
Lilian Baylis was born in Marylebone, London, England, to parents Newton Baylis and Elizabeth (Liebe) née Cons (or Konss). She was the eldest of six children, and grew up surrounded by music and performance. Her mother was a successful singer and pianist, and Baylis's education was grounded in the arts; she began performing and teaching music at an early age. She attended St. Augustine's school, Kilburn. She also took violin lessons at the Royal Academy of Music with leading professionals, such as John Tiplady Carrodus, who was principal first violin at Covent Garden.

== South Africa ==
In 1891, the Baylis family emigrated to South Africa when their performance troupe "The Gypsy Revellers" were offered a long-term contract to tour and perform there. As a teenager Lilian played violin and mandolin in "The Gypsy Revellers". She also taught her mother's music and dance students. She earned a good living and played in many concerts. When Baylis fell ill and had to have an operation on her kidneys, her family became concerned for her heath, especially as the country was in turmoil after the Jameson Raid. Baylis returned to London to recuperate and her aunt Emma Cons offered her a job at The Royal Victoria Hall and Coffee Tavern (known as "The Old Vic"), which she managed. Having spent most of her adolescent years in South Africa, Baylis left behind her family, many close friends, and a fiancé.

After arriving in London she met 12-year-old Gordon Holmes, and the two would become close lifelong friends – Baylis had been romantically involved with Holmes' maternal uncle in Johannesburg, and used to quip to Holmes that, "you know, my dear, if I had married your Uncle Jack, you would be my niece!"

== The Old Vic ==
Baylis assisted Emma Cons in running the Old Vic, and gradually took on more management duties running concerts, film shows, lecture programmes and variety shows. Following Cons' death in 1912, Baylis became lessee and obtained a theatre licence for the Royal Victoria Hall to begin staging theatrical performances.

Initially Baylis was interested in opera, which she preferred to every other art form. She joined forces with Charles Corri to arrange and perform operas at the Old Vic with a small orchestra and limited resources. Plays were introduced to the Old Vic by Rosina Filippi, husband and wife team, Matheson Lang and Hutin Britton, and Sir Philip Ben Greet. The plays of William Shakespeare were often performed and Baylis claimed that the Old Vic had become the London 'Home of Shakespeare'. In the run up to the 300th anniversary of the publication of the First Folio Baylis produced all of Shakespeare's plays, even the ones she knew would be unlikely to generate many ticket sales. The tradition of doing Shakespeare at the Old Vic continued for many years and performers such as John Gielgud and Laurence Olivier were willing to work for low wages if they could play the great Shakespearean roles.

== Sadler's Wells ==
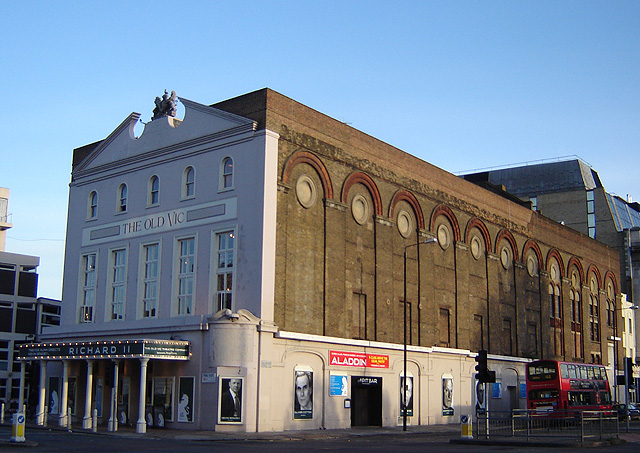
The Old Vic Theatre from the corner of Baylis Road.

In 1925, Baylis began a campaign to re-open the derelict Sadler's Wells Theatre, something she finally achieved with a gala opening on 6 January 1931 of a production of Shakespeare's Twelfth Night starring John Gielgud as Malvolio and Ralph Richardson as Toby Belch. Acquiring Sadler's Wells enabled Baylis to develop her plans for a dance company, something she had wished to do since 1926 when she engaged Ninette de Valois to improve the standard of dancing in operas and plays at the Old Vic. For several years the opera, drama and ballet companies known as the "Vic-Wells" companies, moved between the Old Vic and Sadler's Wells but by 1935 the ballet company, which now included Margot Fonteyn and Robert Helpmann, with guest appearances from Alicia Markova and Anton Dolin, tended to perform at Sadler's Wells. Musical direction was by Constant Lambert, and choreography for new works by de Valois and rising star Frederick Ashton. The ballet company's descendants today are the Royal Ballet and the Birmingham Royal Ballet. Today the Sadler's Wells Theatre is primarily a dance venue.

== Growing stars ==
The Vic-Wells nurtured the careers of stars such as Laurence Olivier, John Gielgud, Peggy Ashcroft, Sybil Thorndike, Edith Evans, Alec Guinness, Marius Goring, Michael Redgrave, Maurice Evans and Ralph Richardson, and became famous for stylish productions under the artistic directorship of Tyrone Guthrie during the 1930s. In 1937 Guthrie's production of Hamlet played at Elsinore/Helsingør in Denmark, with Olivier in the title role, and Vivien Leigh as Ophelia. Gielgud's first performance as Hamlet in 1930 became the first Old Vic production to be transferred to the West End for a run. Baylis scored a casting coup in 1933 by featuring Charles Laughton at the theatre after he had become a worldwide name in the film The Private Life of Henry VIII. To exploit the audiences' interest in the film, she cast Laughton as Shakespeare's Henry VIII.

== Recognition and death ==
Baylis was awarded an honorary master's degree from Oxford University for her work in the theatre in 1924, only the fourth such honour to be given to a woman by the university. In 1929 she was appointed a Member of the Order of the Companions of Honour (CH) for service to the nation. In 1934 Birmingham University awarded Baylis an honorary doctorate. A Greater London Council blue plaque commemorates Baylis at her home, 27 Stockwell Park Road in Stockwell, South London. and the Lilian Baylis Technology School, Kennington is so named in her honour.

After a long illness, Baylis died of a heart attack on 25 November 1937, aged 63 in Lambeth, South London, the night before the Old Vic was to open a production of Macbeth starring Laurence Olivier and Judith Anderson. She was cremated at East London Cemetery and Crematorium, where her ashes were scattered at her request. There is a memorial plaque for Lilian Baylis at the Actors' Church, St Paul's, in the heart of Covent Garden.

== Influence ==
In 1985, English National Opera created an education and outreach department, naming it the Baylis Programme called in Lilian Baylis's honour. The Baylis Programme (later called ENO Baylis and recently renamed to ENO Engage) was led for ten years by its founder directors Rebecca Meitlis and David Sulkin. Subsequent directors included Steve Moffitt, Alice King-Farlow and Jenny Mollica now CEO of ENO. In the Lilian Baylis tradition the work of ENO Engage focusses on those who are new to opera. It involves around 12,000 people every year in a wide range of projects, events, courses and performances, with a goal of developing creative responses to opera and music theatre; making new work with communities and exploring individual creativity as a means of providing access to ENO's productions; and encouraging learning and development through participation of artists and collaboration of resources.

The current Sadler's Wells Theatre contains a 200-seat theatre named after her, and the National Theatre has a Lilian Baylis Terrace. The upper circle in the Old Vic is called the Lilian Baylis Circle. A building in West Hampstead used by ENO for rehearsals and production wardrobe is called Lilian Baylis House. In Vauxhall the Lilian Baylis Secondary School is also named in her honour. There is a Lilian Baylis Rose, and the Royal Victoria Hall Foundation administers the annual Lilian Baylis Awards for promising acting students. A street alongside Waterloo station is named Baylis Road.
