= Tim Robinson (referee) =

English football referee (born 1984)

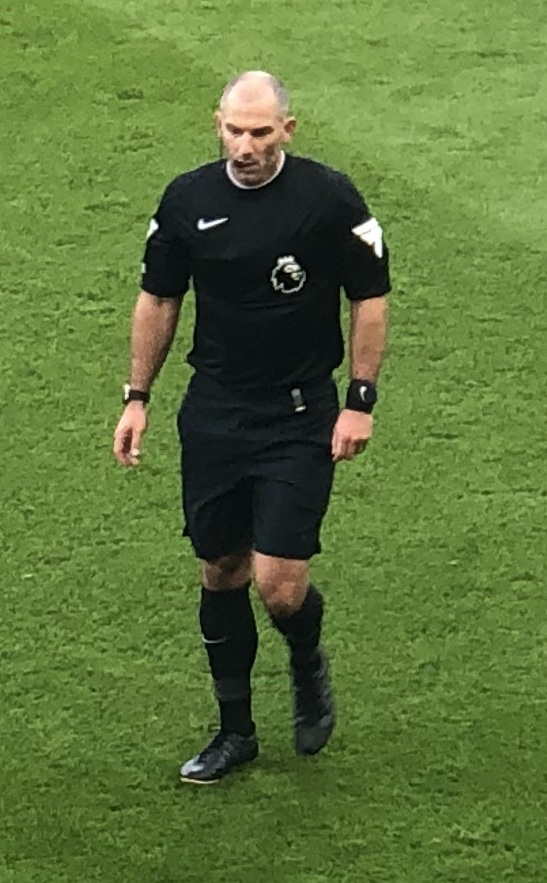
- Robinson in 2024
- Born: 1 January 1984 (age 42); Bognor Regis, England

Domestic
Years	League	Role
2011–	English Football League	Referee
2023–	Premier League	Referee

Tim Robinson (born 1 January 1984) is an English football referee who officiates primarily in the Premier League. His county FA is the Sussex Football Association.

== Early life ==
Robinson was born on 1 January 1984 in West Sussex.

== Career ==
Robinson progressed through the Sussex leagues before moving to the National League and Football League. He began refereeing in the Football League in 2011. In 2016, he became a full-time match official and gave up his job as a PE teacher.

On 14 December 2019, Robinson officiated his first Premier League match, which ended as a 1–0 victory for Burnley against Newcastle United. He was promoted to Select Group 1 for the 2023–24 season.

On 25 February 2024, he was fourth official to Chris Kavanagh in the EFL Cup final between Chelsea and Liverpool.
