= J Hudson & Co =

English manufacturer of whistles

J. Hudson and Co. Ltd
- Company type: Private
- Industry: Manufacturing
- Founded: Birmingham, England (1883)
- Headquarters: Birmingham, England
- Key people: Joseph Hudson, Founder; Simon Topman, managing director
- Products: Whistles
- Revenue: ▲5 million GBP (2005)
- Number of employees: ~50
- Website: acmewhistles.co.uk

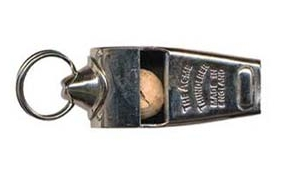
The Acme Thunderer. The name "Acme" was taken from the Greek word acme, meaning a high point, indicating that the whistle was a tool for producing a very high decibel level. Their Tornado 2000 whistle is capable of easily reaching 122 decibels.

J Hudson & Co was founded in the 1870s in Birmingham by Joseph Hudson (1848–1930) and his brother James Hudson (1850–1889). The company became a manufacturer of whistles and continues as Acme Whistles. Acme is the world's largest and most famous producer of whistles. They are headquartered in the Jewellery Quarter district of Birmingham, England.

== History ==
The company was family-run for over 100 years and three generations; Joseph Hudson's son, James Clifford Hudson and his grandson, Leon Clifford Hudson ran the company after Joseph retired. As of 2014, Acme Whistles are now owned and managed by Simon Topman.

=== 1883–1908 ===
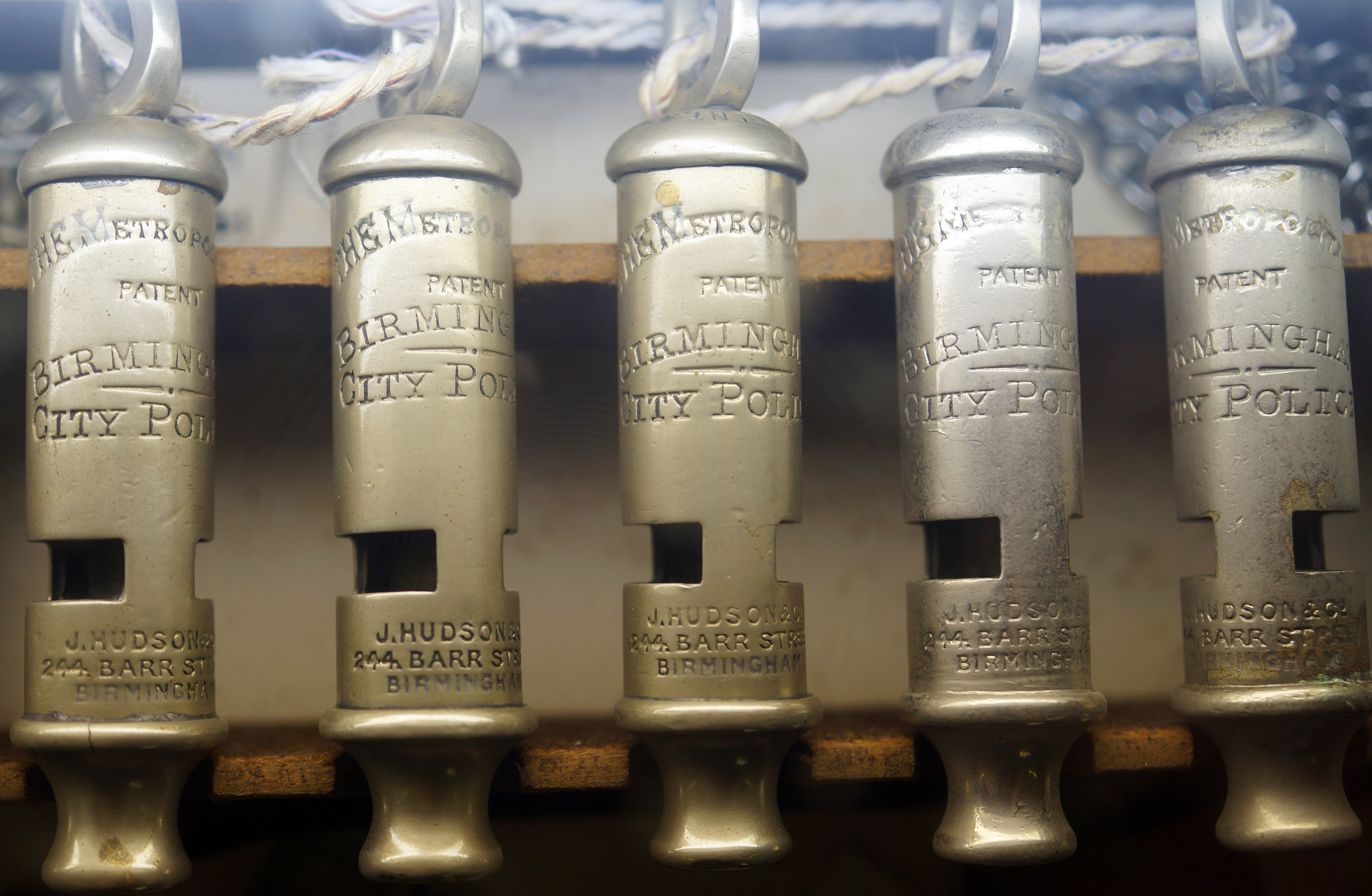
Birmingham City Police whistles in the West Midlands Police Museum

Joseph Hudson started working at the age of 12. He moved to Bent & Parker, a maker of army supplies and whistles in Birmingham. In 1870, aged 22, he started his own business with younger brother James.

In 1883 Hudson began tinkering in his toolshed to make gadgets to sell, including whistles. After observing local police struggling to communicate with rattles, he realised that his whistle could be used as a tool. As the story goes, Hudson, a violin player, accidentally dropped his violin and it shattered on the floor. Observing how the discordant sound of the breaking strings travelled, Hudson had the idea to put a pea in the whistle. This gave it an ear splitting rattle that could grab attention even a mile away. After a demonstration at Scotland Yard, Hudson had his first sale.

This 1884 contract with the police gradually made Hudson the largest whistle manufacturer for British Empire police forces, military, sports, railways and many others. By the 1890s, Hudson faced the rise of many competitor makers and companies.

Highlights of early company history include:

- 1895: Introduction of the Acme Siren
- 1898: Hudson purchases Black & Co.
- 1898: J Barrall exits the whistle-making Business.
- 1901: Hudson makes Stevens & Sons whistles.
- 1904: Hudson purchases R A Walton.
- 1907: Hudson purchases S Auld Whistles, continuing to manufacture their models especially the Round " pignose " type known as 'Glasgow type police call'.
- 1904: Hudson fills orders (along with De Courcy) for W Dowler & Sons who stops manufacturing whistles.
- During this period, Coney & Co. stops making whistles and Hudson makes their models.
- In early 1900 Hudson makes whistles on a small scale for Bent & Parker.
- At an unknown date c. late 1890s, early 1900 T Yates stops manufacturing whistles.
- 1903 H A Ward stops making whistles. (Year of death)

By 1908, Hudson and De Courcy were the two major whistle makers in England.

=== 1909–1930 ===
Starting 1909 at a new facility in northern Birmingham at 244 Barr St., Hudson expanded to more markets in Europe and overseas, with an office in Paris, a large 1910 French catalogue, and new connections with United States sporting goods companies and distributors. Hudson was left with just one British competitor, A De Courcy & Co, from 1909 to 1927.

In 1912, the company made whistles that were used by the crew on board the RMS Titanic.

In 1927 Hudson purchased A De Courcy's patent rights, tools and stock. Hudson became the world's largest maker, gaining the Thunderer Registered Trademark. The Acme Thunderer whistle and its variations became the world's best-selling whistle.

During this period, 1925 to 1930, three generations of the Hudson family ran the business together. This was the end of the golden age of whistle making.

=== 1930–2000 ===
At the beginning of this period the company faced competition from whistles made of tin, plastic and cast base metal materials made in Germany, Japan, USA and other countries.

On 26 October 1940, the factory received a direct hit from a German air raid. No one was injured, but the factory suffered major damage. Air Raid Precautions whistles were made during the next few years and dated whistles for army, navy and Royal Air Force equipment and for Civil Defence.

In 1949 the firm was re-constituted as J. Hudson & Co. (Whistles) Ltd. Leon C. Hudson became its first managing director.

The 1950s and 60s marked growing demand for Hudson sports whistles (Olympics and other sport events on five continents).

In 1957 A. R. Topman became an assistant general manager, and about 40 years later his son, Simon Topman, became the owner and the managing director of the company, starting the fourth period of company developments.

In 1998, Simon Topman and Martyn Gilchrist co-authored a book titled Collecting Police Whistles And Similar Types.

=== Present ===
The factory name was changed to Acme Whistles and makes about 5 million whistles each year. It continues to register new patents for whistles. The period was marked with growing competition from Far East manufacturers.

They have made over a billion whistles altogether. In addition to the "Thunderer", they make varieties of bird calls, dog calls, safety whistles, sports whistles, orchestral whistles and party whoopers.

== Patents, registered designs and trademarks ==
Year	Patent	Description
1885	435	Whistle-diaphragm disc
1898	19700	Whistle-diaphragm disc
1907	1112	Whistle combined with pocket knife
1907	25619	Whistle attached to a wrist strap
1908	5727	Two piece top
1911	28999	Unibody GSW
1923	213487	Groove in cap for escargot-type
1923	214519	Pressed top

Registered Designs

Year	Number	Details
1895	256361	Double end whistle Metropolitan plus Round pea whistle-type
1893	217010	Oval whistle
1897	311230	Oval whistle with oval Porteous top
1909	540164	Pillar top
1924	705987	Compass replacing top cap

Registered Trademarks

The Metropolitan	1884
The Acme	1886
The Kinglet	1907
Acme city	1907
Emca	1922
Acme	1927

- The above tables shows essential patents and registered designs out of many and up to 1927.
- Many patents were registered after 1927 and new improvements and inventions are constantly being registered.

== Catalogues ==
- 1935 Acme whistle catalogue ( English )
- 1910 Acme whistle catalogue ( French )

== Models and whistle types ==
While many makers concentrated on limited variety, J Hudson & Co made a wide variety of common whistle types, including bird calls, dog calls, fox calls and musical whistles as well as sound effects, slide whistles and novelty combination whistles. Some models, such as the Thunderer escargot-type and the Metropolitan general service whistle have been popular throughout most of the company's history.

Hudson was the only maker in the United Kingdom to use wood horn, Bakelite, plastic and silver, while competitors other than James Dixon & Sons were working solely with metal or other materials.

Some of the most popular whistle designs in the modern day include:

Whistle Type	Notes
ACME Thunderer	Classic pea whistle
ACME Cyclone	High pitched whistle with no pea
ACME T2000	The world's most powerful whistle used by FIFA and FINA
ACME Tornado	Powerful but slimline whistle

== Body stamps ==
Hudson stamped addresses and other marks on many of its whistles. Marked service whistles have been used by many police forces, railway companies, fire brigades and other organisations. The stamps supply an easy tool for dating the item. Address stamps are more commonly found on the GSWs than other types. Notable body stamps include:

- Police small arms inspection marks, or army broad arrow stamps.
- Early Metropolitan police whistles had a hand-engraved number at the back that were punched on later ones. These exist in various forms and have been classified as MP-1 to MP-22.
- The Mark Street address is not known to have been used on any whistles, and beside the addresses mentioned at the top table, the address Barr Street Hockley was used on many whistles made after World War I.
- The stamp of 131 Barr Street is extremely rare on escargot-type.
- Early general service whistles have a Patent & J Hudson & Co stamp on the diaphragm.
- "Acme" remains a common stamp on Hudson whistles as does the reversed name "Emca".
- At times initials consisting of a single letter or two are used as abbreviations; 'MH' for mental hospital, 'FB' for fire brigade, 'P' for prison or police, 'T' for tramway and others.
- Stamps of a particular model or popular names at one time or another, include "International", "The King's Own" or "Taxi Call".
- Acme supplied the original ship's mates' whistles used aboard the RMS Titanic in 1912. In 2012 a replica of this whistle was created to mark the 100 year anniversary of the sinking of the Titanic.
