= Janez Mejač =

Slovenian ballet dancer and choreographer

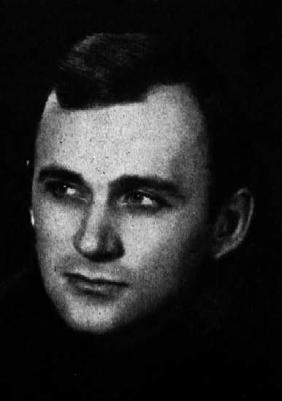
- Born: 20 October 2020 (age 5); Mokronog, Drava Banovina, Kingdom of Yugoslavia
- Known for: ballet, choreography
- Awards: Prešeren Award

Janez Mejač (born 30 May 1936) is a Slovenian ballet dancer and choreographer.

== Life and work ==
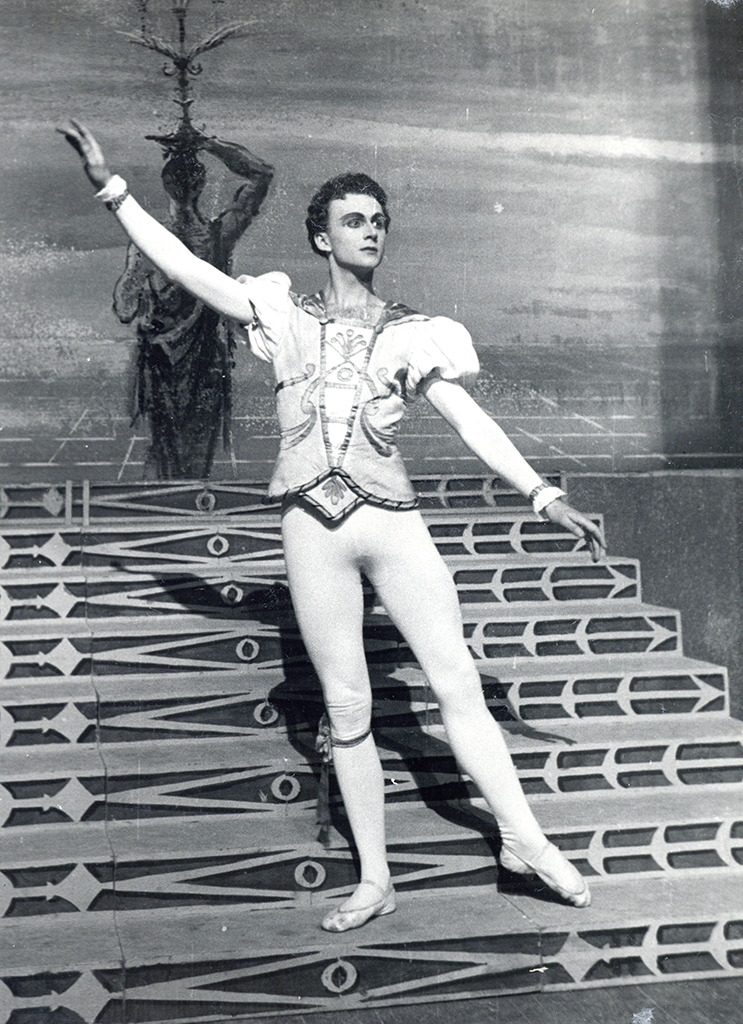
Janez Mejač in 1959

Mejač was born in Mokronog. He completed gymnasium and ballet high school in Ljubljana. In 1954, he became a member of the Ljubljana Ballet Theatre. At first, he performed in the corps de ballet, and later he became the principal dancer. In the 1965–66 season, he was a ballet solo dancer at the Stora Theatre in Gothenburg. He also improved his dance in France (Cannes).

In his career, he performed 84 solo ballet roles and created 62 choreographies in drama theatres and opera. He managed the ballet youth education in Trieste and was a lecturer of stage movement and historical dances at the Academy of Music in Ljubljana. In 1981–1984 and 1995–1998, he was the head of the Ljubljana Ballet Theatre. He retired in 1987.

== Recognitions and awards ==
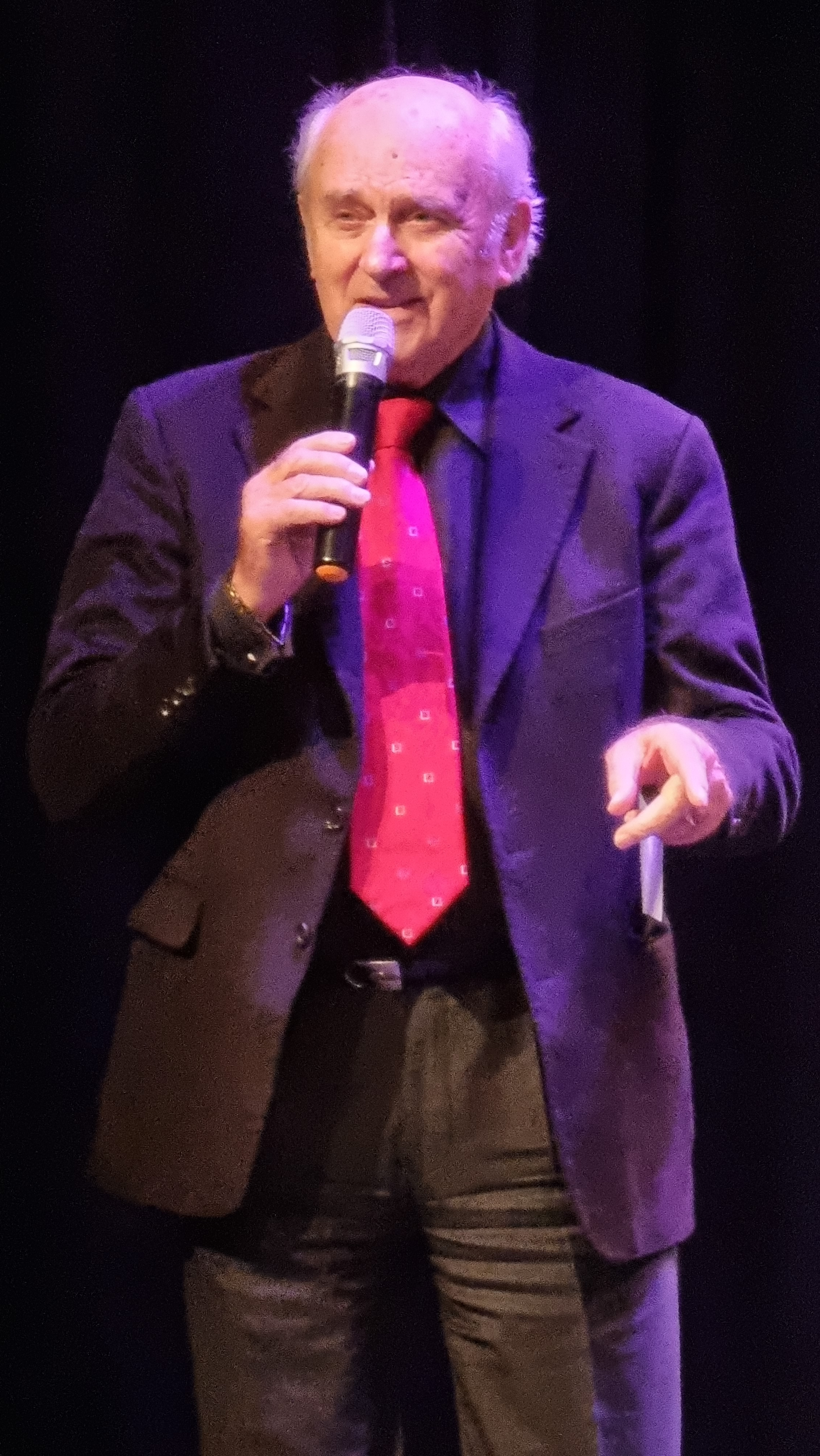
Janez Mejač (Mokronog, October 2022)

Mejač was awarded the title of a first-class performer by the Ministry of Culture in 1973; three years later (1976), he received the Prešeren Fund Award for the role of the Rake in the ballet The Rake's Progress, and in 1979 he was awarded a prize for the role of the Groom in the ballet The Devil in the Village.

The Slovenian Theatre Museum presented his art and life in 2005 in the exhibition and the book titled Janez Mejač : Danseur noble.

On 13 February 2011, the Association of Ballet Artists of Slovenia awarded him the professional Lydia Wisiakova Prize, on 11 July 2011, he was bestowed with the Order for Merits, and in 2018, he was awarded the Prešeren Award for lifetime achievement.
