= Henry Arthur Ward =

British whistle maker

Henry Arthur Ward (1838–1903) was a Birmingham whistle maker who made whistles of high quality, all rare and hard to find. He made whistles from 1876 to 1903.

== History and addresses ==
65 Weasman Street	1889–1897
27 Loveday street	1898 - 1902
99 Snow hill	1903 - 1908

H. A. Ward is one of the whistle makers that little is known about, and most of it is revealed by his designs and stamps, which testify to an innovative maker of high-quality whistles. All his whistles are rare and some were discovered only in the last year or two (2008).

During 1889–1890 he had some partnership with a Birmingham whistle maker named Peter McDonald and they applied for a patent # 2980 in February 1890, the patent was never granted, it was for a Glasgow-style escargot-type whistle constructed of 6 parts in a way similar to one that S Auld received a patent for in the same year.

== Models and types ==
- Escargot-type whistles; H A Ward may have made the First model of the famous "Thunderer" London style whistle, later to be become popular by with numerous whistle manufacturers until J Hudson and co. were granted the registered trade mark at 1927 after years of legal fights and claims. Only one London style of H A Ward 'Thunderer' had been seen.
- Glasgow style Escargot, The Alpha Improved Call No 23 & No 24 are two rare samples and they were planned for use for railway guards and with the Glasgow area police forces which preferred using round pea whistles and escargot-type while the rest of England adopted the cylindrical two notes GSW. (General service whistle).
- small types of musical slide whistles of one octave range.
- Beaufort whistles.
- General service whistles, mostly ones stamped with " Police or Fire whistle " name variations. These were made with cast top mouthpieces at the earlier ones and later with rolled mouthpieces.

Of the British whistle makers, he was the only one that seemed to have made cast GSWs, though they may have been made at B Lily & Sons in Birmingham, since they were one of his main outlets for selling whistles in Birmingham and also made cast patterns in pewter and Britannia metal. It may be noted here that B Lily & sons were located at the same street as J Hudson & Co at the time and sold other makers but Hudson's. and supplied whistles ordered from Ward, De Courcy and T Yates among others.

- Round pea whistles some stamped and some not, Many named; 'Midget', 'Express', made for B Lily & Sons
- Two pipes or multi tube whistles with inline mouthpiece.

== Body stamps ==
- 'H.A.W', 'Thunderer', 'The City Whistle'
- 'The City Police', 'The Standart Police or Fire', 'L.M.S' London Midland & Scottish Railway.
- 'The City Police or Fire Whistle' in 5 Lines & in 3 Lines along the whistle cylindrical body.
- 'Express' on a round pea whistle, 'Speedwell' on a Double pipe type.
