= A Rake's Progress =

Painting series by William Hogarth

A Rake's Progress (or The Rake's Progress) is a series of eight paintings by 18th-century English artist William Hogarth. The canvases were produced in 1732–1734, then engraved in 1734 and published in print form in 1735. The series shows the decline and fall of Tom Rakewell (a stock character), the spendthrift son and heir of a rich merchant, who comes to London, wastes all his money on luxurious living, prostitutes and gambling, and as a consequence is imprisoned in the Fleet Prison (a debtors' prison) and ultimately Bethlem Hospital (Bedlam). The original paintings are in the collection of Sir John Soane's Museum in London, where they are normally on display for a short period each day.

The filmmaker Alan Parker has described the works as an ancestor to the storyboard.

== Paintings ==
=== I – The Heir ===
In the first painting, Tom has come into his fortune on the death of his miserly father. While the servants mourn, he is measured for new clothes. Although he has had a common-law marriage with her, he now rejects the hand of his pregnant fiancée, Sarah Young, whom he had promised to marry. She holds his ring and her mother holds his love letters. He pays her off, but she still loves him, as becomes clear in the fourth painting. Behind Tom, the administrator of the estate steals a coin from the money bag Tom holds.

Evidence of the father's miserliness abounds: his portrait above the fireplace shows him counting money; symbols of hospitality (a roasting jack and spit) have been locked up at upper right; the coat of arms shows three clamped vises with the motto "Beware"; a half-starved cat reveals the father kept little food in the house, while a lack of ashes in the fireplace demonstrates that he spent even less money on wood to heat his home.

A servant hanging mourning crepe accidentally uncovers a cache of gold coins. The engraving (right), which is reversed left-to-right compared to the painting, shows the father went so far as to resole his shoes with a piece of leather cut from a Bible cover. An account book has an entry of the miser's joy of getting rid of a bad shilling.

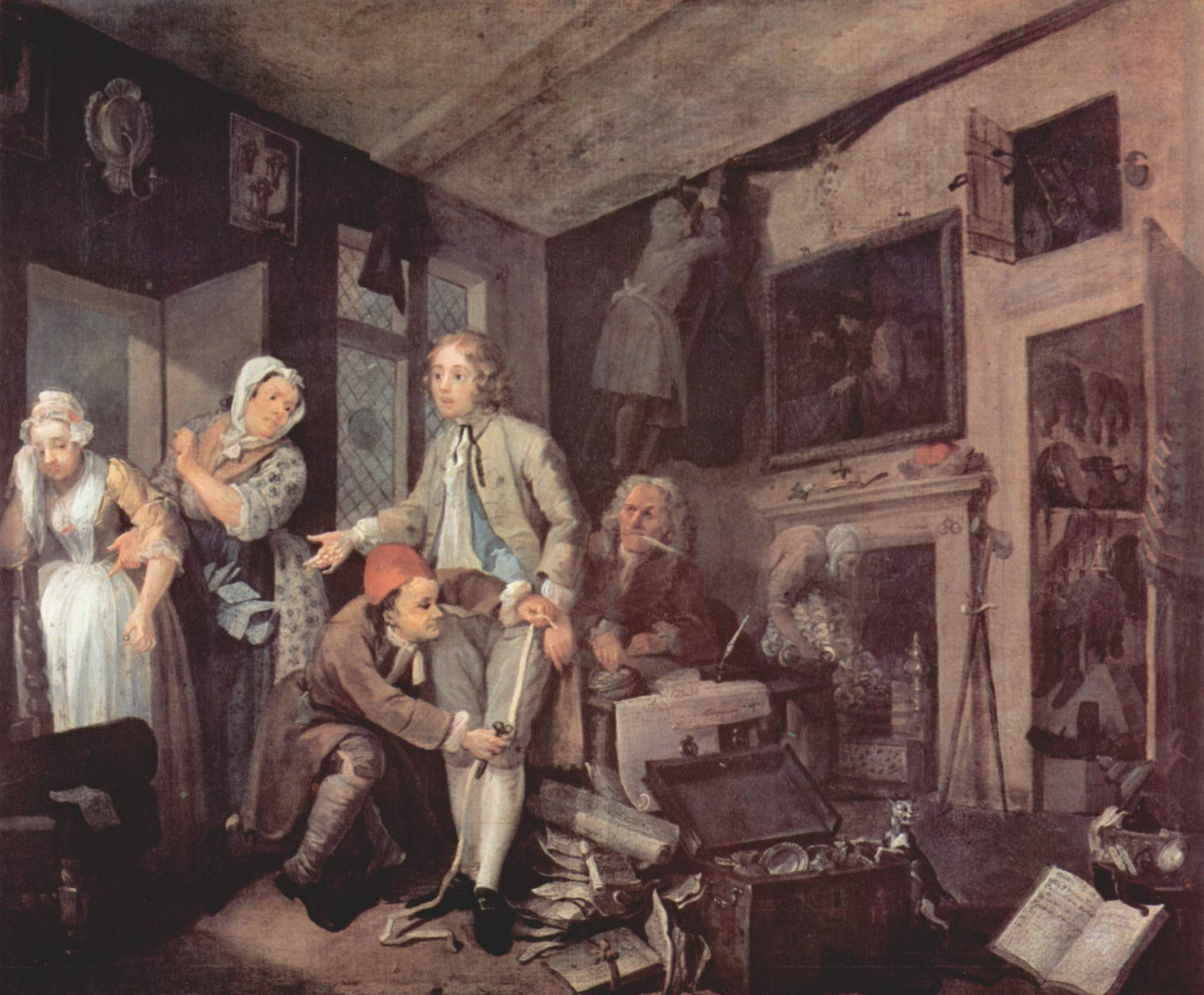
The Heir

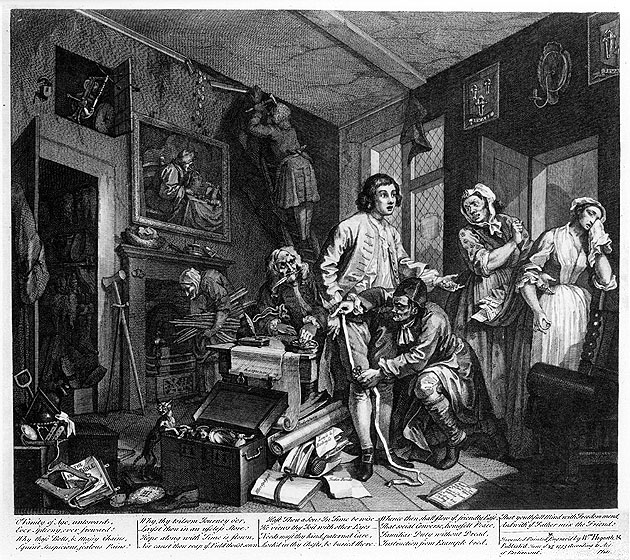
The Heir (engraving)

=== II – The Levée ===
In the second painting, Tom is at his morning levée in his new London home, attended by musicians and other hangers-on, all dressed in expensive costumes. Surrounding Tom from left to right: a music master at a harpsichord, who was supposed to represent George Frideric Handel or Nicola Porpora; a fencing master; a quarterstaff instructor; a dancing master with a violin; a landscape gardener, Charles Bridgeman; an ex-soldier offering to be a bodyguard; and a bugler of a fox hunt club.

At lower right is a jockey with a silver trophy showing Tom's racehorse "Silly Tom." In the background left are more hangers-on, including a poet, a wig maker and a hat maker. The quarterstaff instructor looks disapprovingly on both the fencing and dancing masters. Both masters appear to be in the "French" style, which was a subject Hogarth loathed. Upon the wall, between paintings of roosters (emblems of cockfighting), there is a painting of the Judgement of Paris.

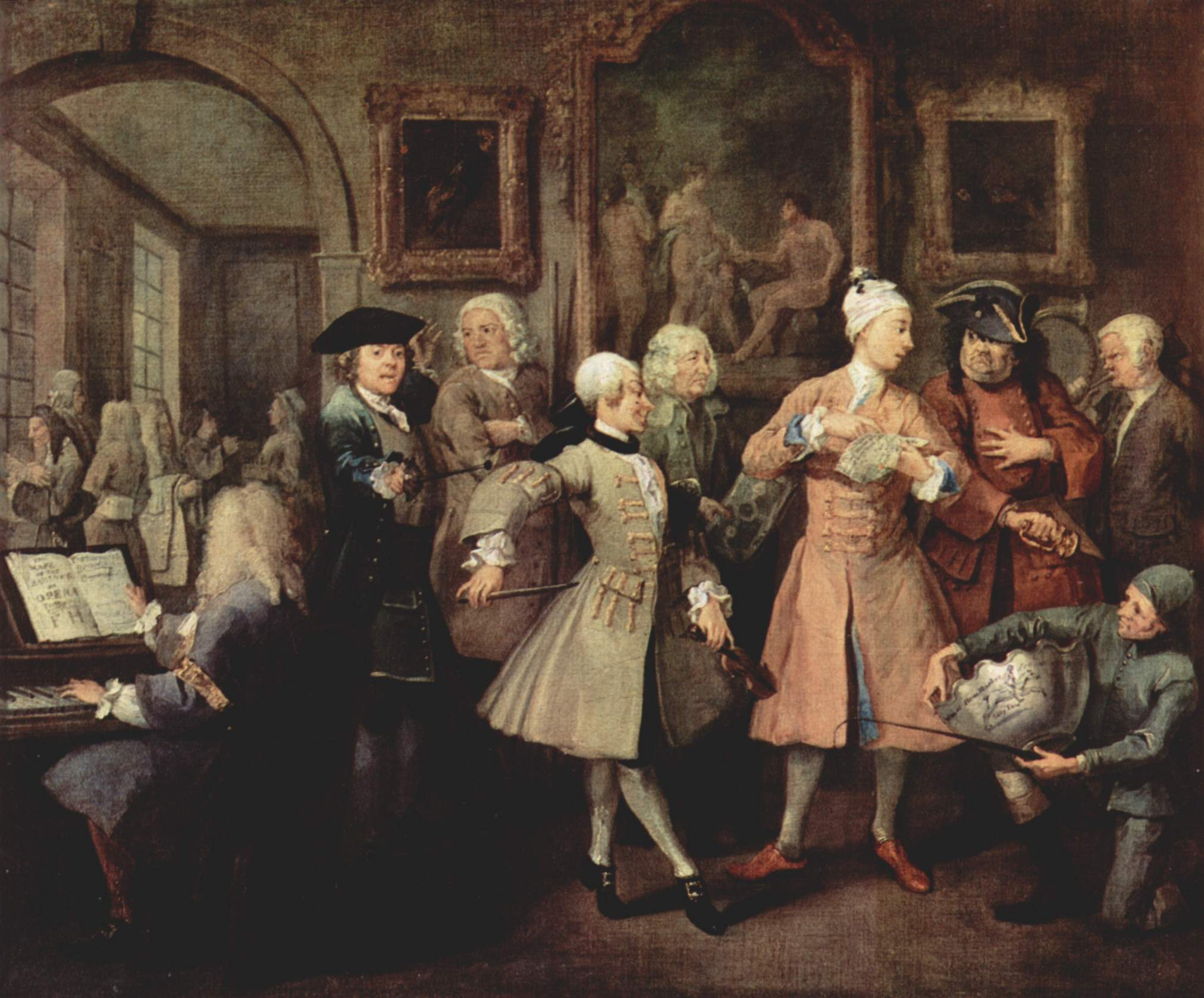
The Levée

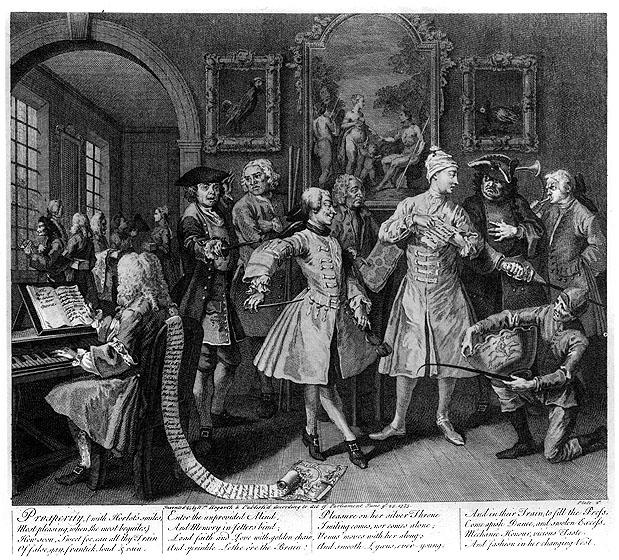
The Levée (engraving)

=== III – The Orgy ===
The third painting depicts a wild party or orgy underway at a brothel. The prostitutes are stealing the drunken Tom's watch. On the floor at bottom right is a night watchman's staff and lantern — souvenirs of Tom's 'wild night' on the town. The scene takes place at the Rose Tavern, a famous brothel in Covent Garden. The prostitutes have black spots on their faces to cover syphilitic sores.

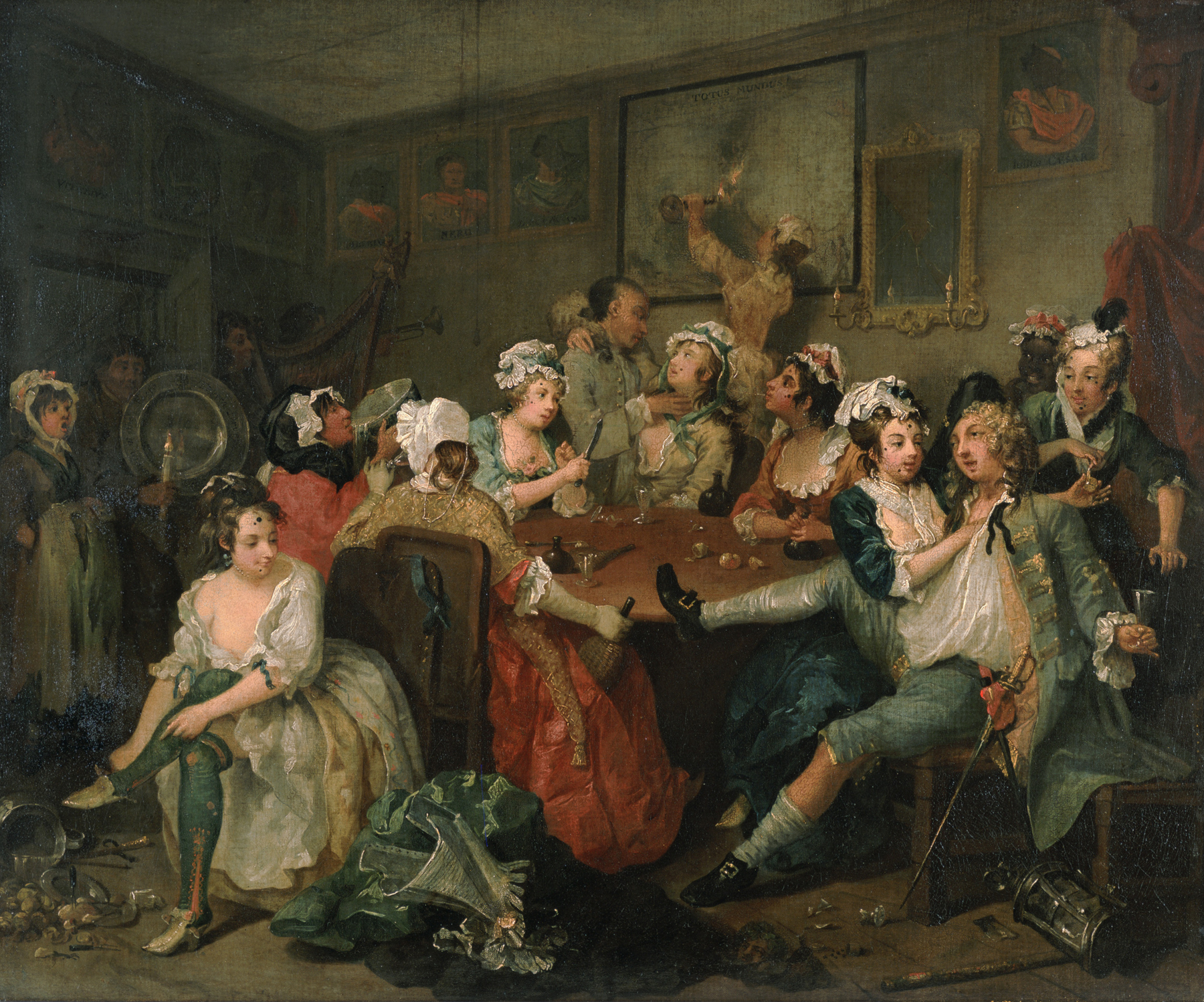
The Orgy

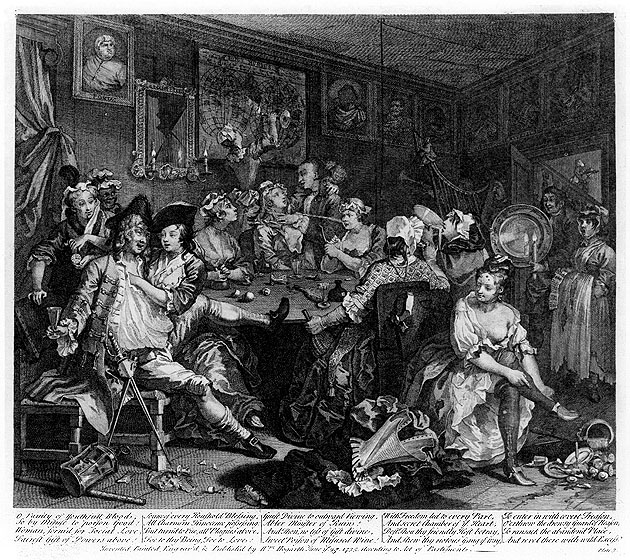
The Orgy (engraving)

=== IV – The Arrest ===
In the fourth, he narrowly escapes arrest for debt by Welsh bailiffs (as signified by the leeks, a Welsh emblem, in their hats) as he travels in a sedan chair to a party at St James's Palace to celebrate Queen Caroline's birthday on Saint David's Day. Saint David is the patron saint of Wales. On this occasion he is saved by the intervention of Sarah Young, the girl he had earlier rejected. She is apparently a dealer in millinery and pays the bill.

In comic relief, a man filling a street lantern spills the oil on Tom's head. This is a sly reference to how blessings on a person were accompanied by oil poured on the head. In this case, the "blessing" being the "saving" of Tom by Sarah, although Rakewell, being a rake, will not take the moral lesson to heart. In the engraved version, lightning flashes in the sky toward White's gambling club and a young pickpocket has just emptied Tom's pocket. At the lower right, urchins are gambling. The painting shows the young thief stealing Tom's cane, and has no lightning.

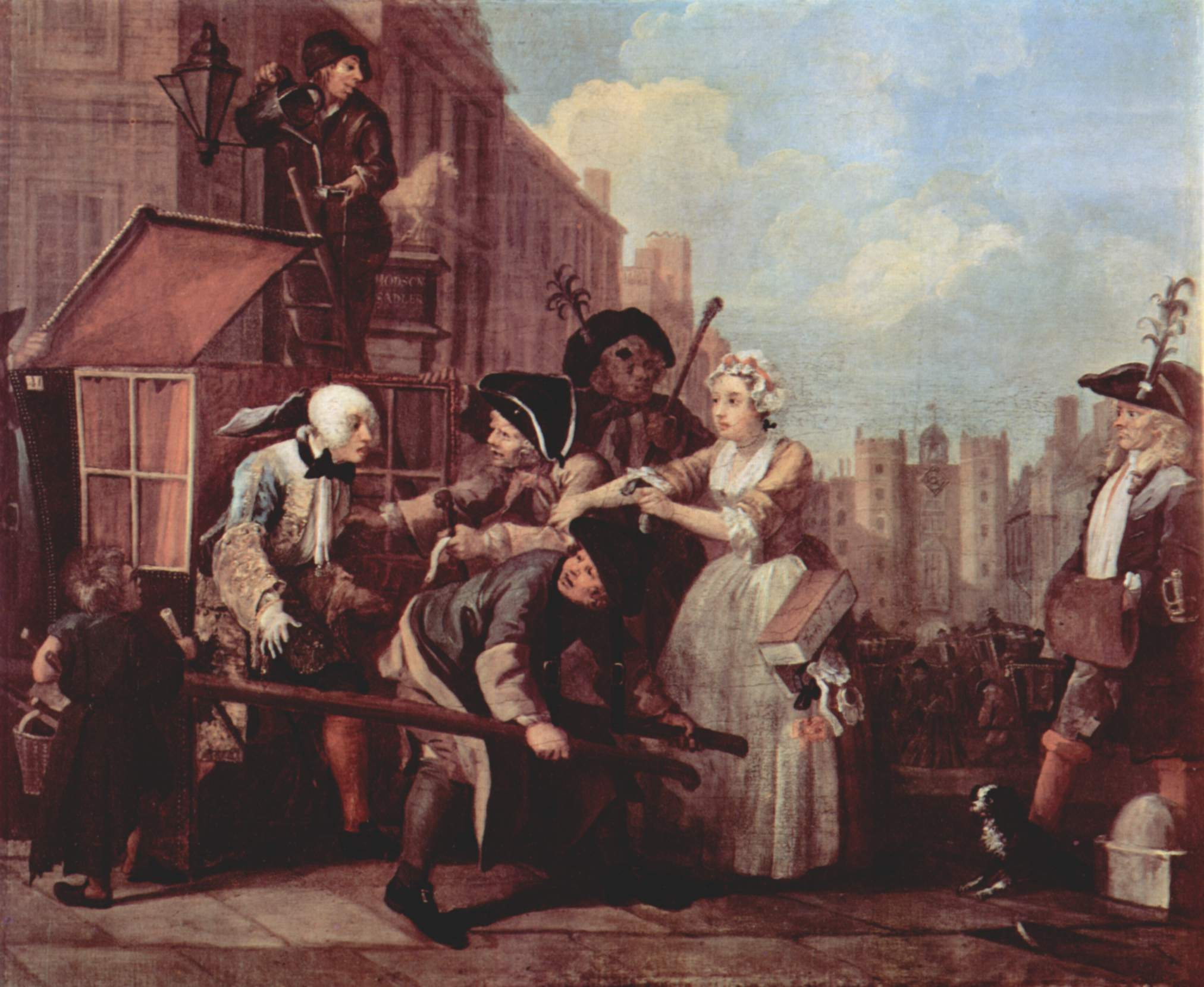
The Arrest

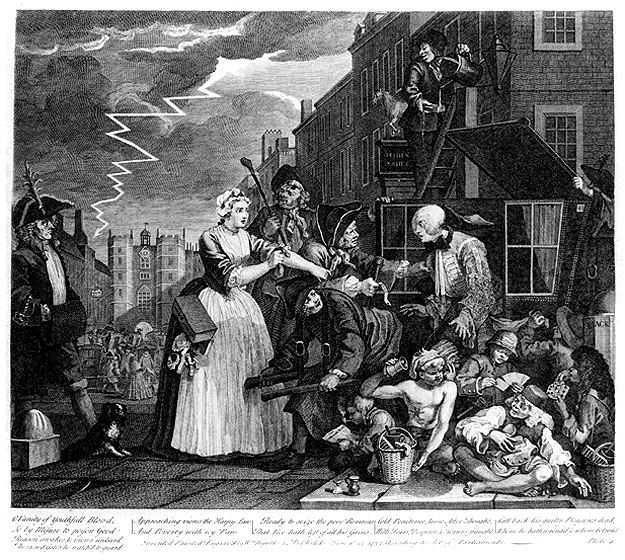
The Arrest (engraving)

=== V – The Marriage ===
In the fifth, Tom attempts to salvage his fortune by marrying a wealthy but old and ugly spinster at the St Marylebone Parish Church. In the background, Sarah arrives, holding their child while her indignant mother struggles with another repudiated lover and her mother. It looks as though Tom's eyes are already upon the pretty maid to his new wife's left during the nuptials.

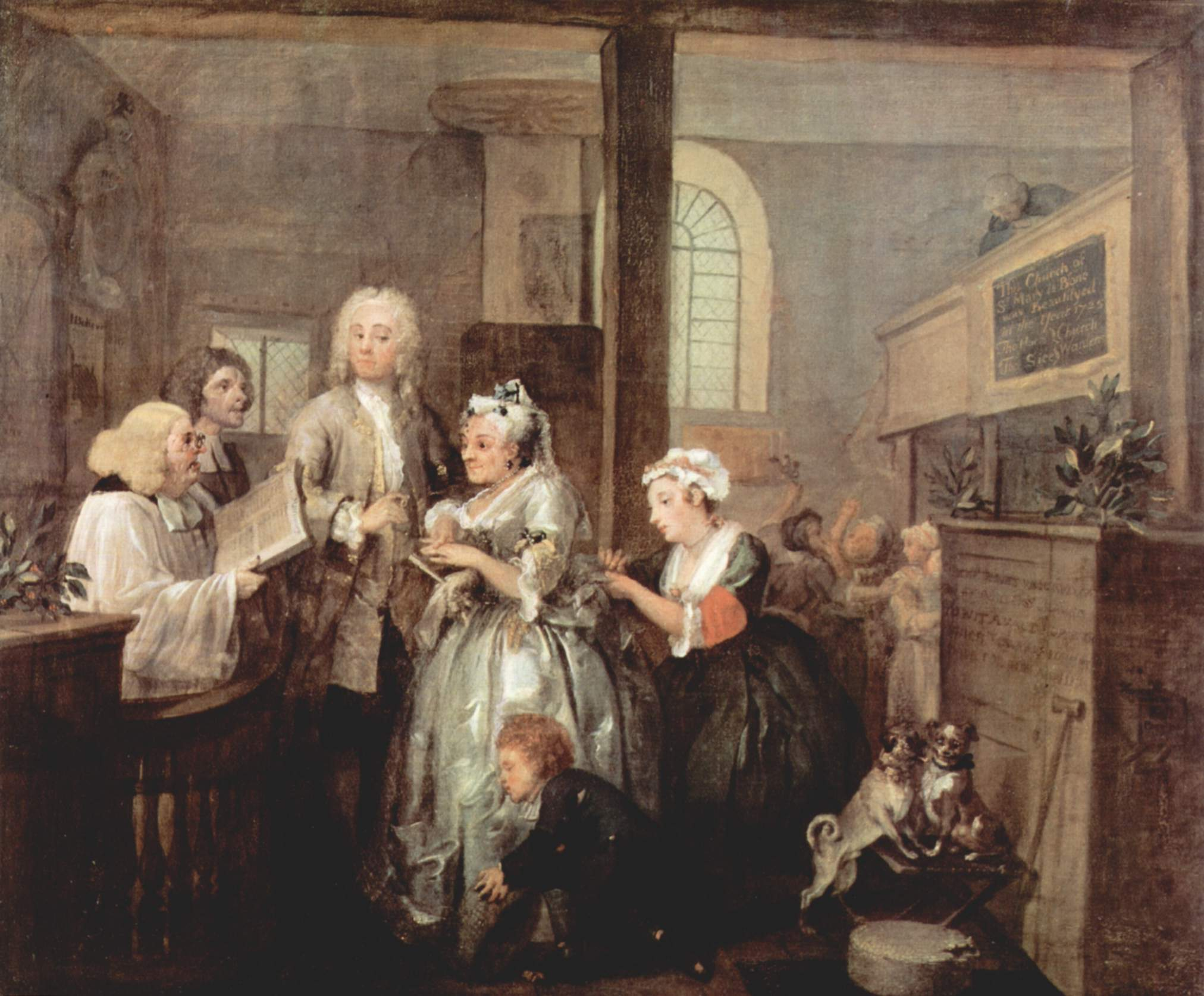
The Marriage

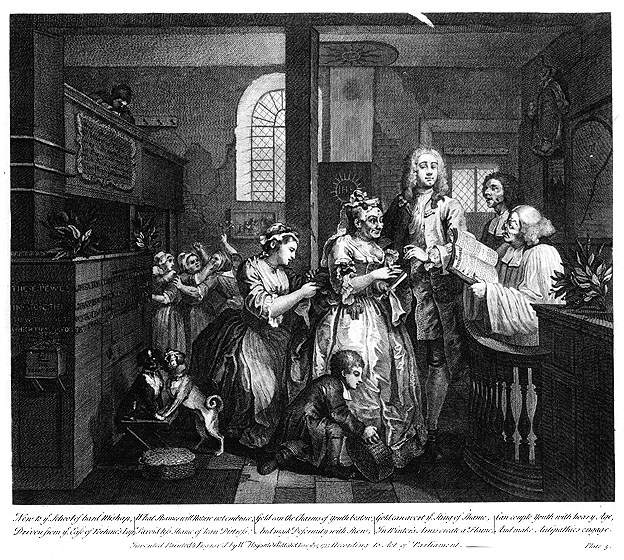
The Marriage (engraving)

=== VI – The Gaming House ===
The sixth painting shows Tom pleading for the assistance of the Almighty in a gambling den at White's club after losing his reacquired wealth. Neither he nor the other obsessive gamblers seem to have noticed a fire that is breaking out behind them.

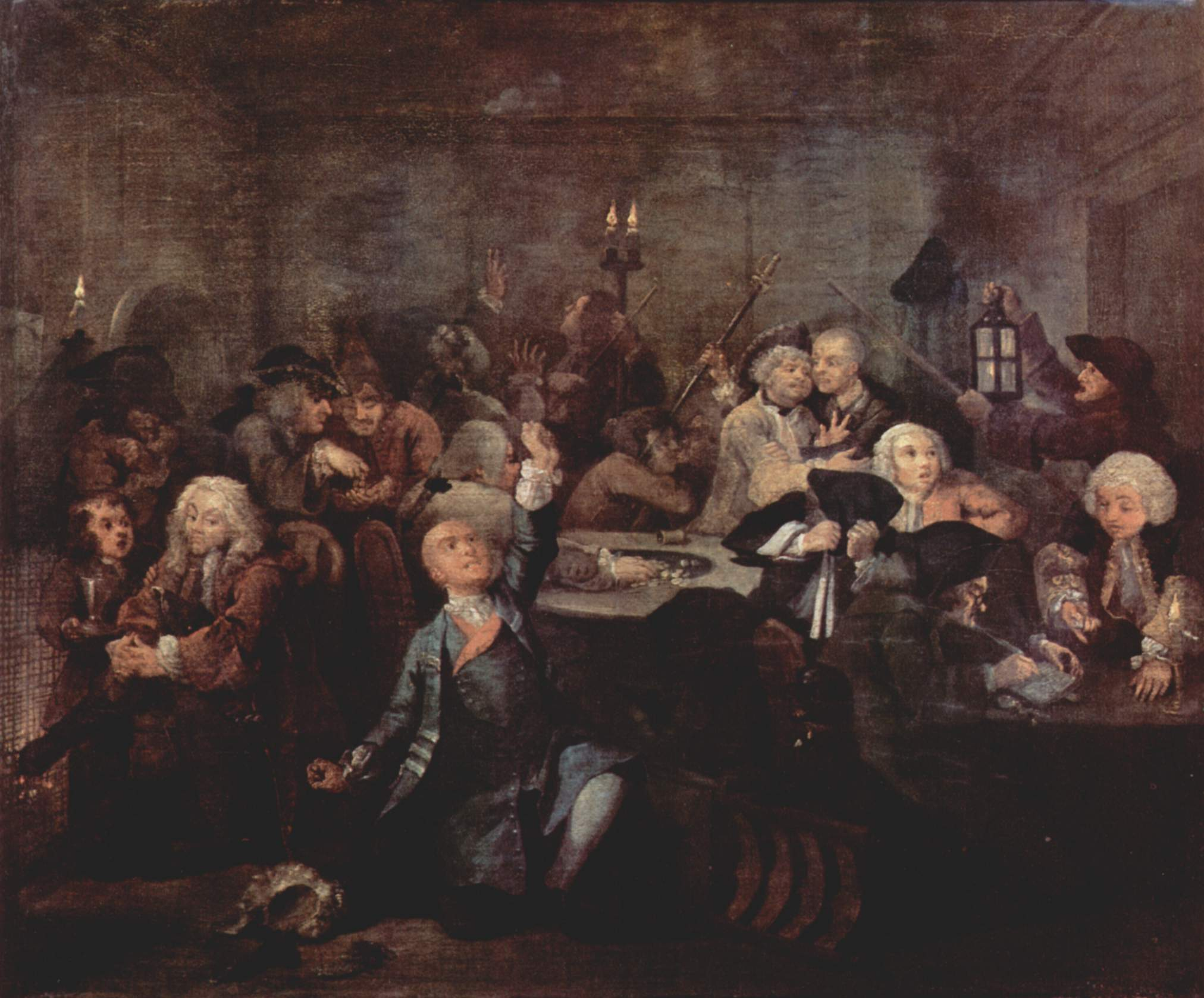
The Gaming House

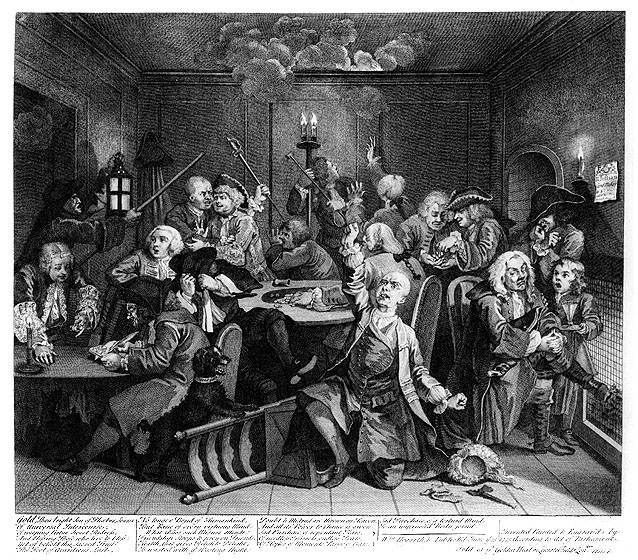
The Gaming House (engraving)

=== VII – The Prison ===
All is lost by the seventh painting, and Tom is incarcerated in the notorious Fleet debtors' prison. He ignores the distress of both his angry new wife and faithful Sarah, who cannot help him this time. Both the beer-boy and jailer demand money from him. Tom begins to go mad, as indicated by both a telescope for celestial observation poking out of the barred window (an apparent reference to the longitude rewards offered by the British government) and an alchemy experiment in the background.

Beside Tom is a rejected play. Another inmate is writing a pamphlet on how to solve the national debt. Above the bed at right is an apparatus for wings, which is more clearly seen in the engraved version at the left.

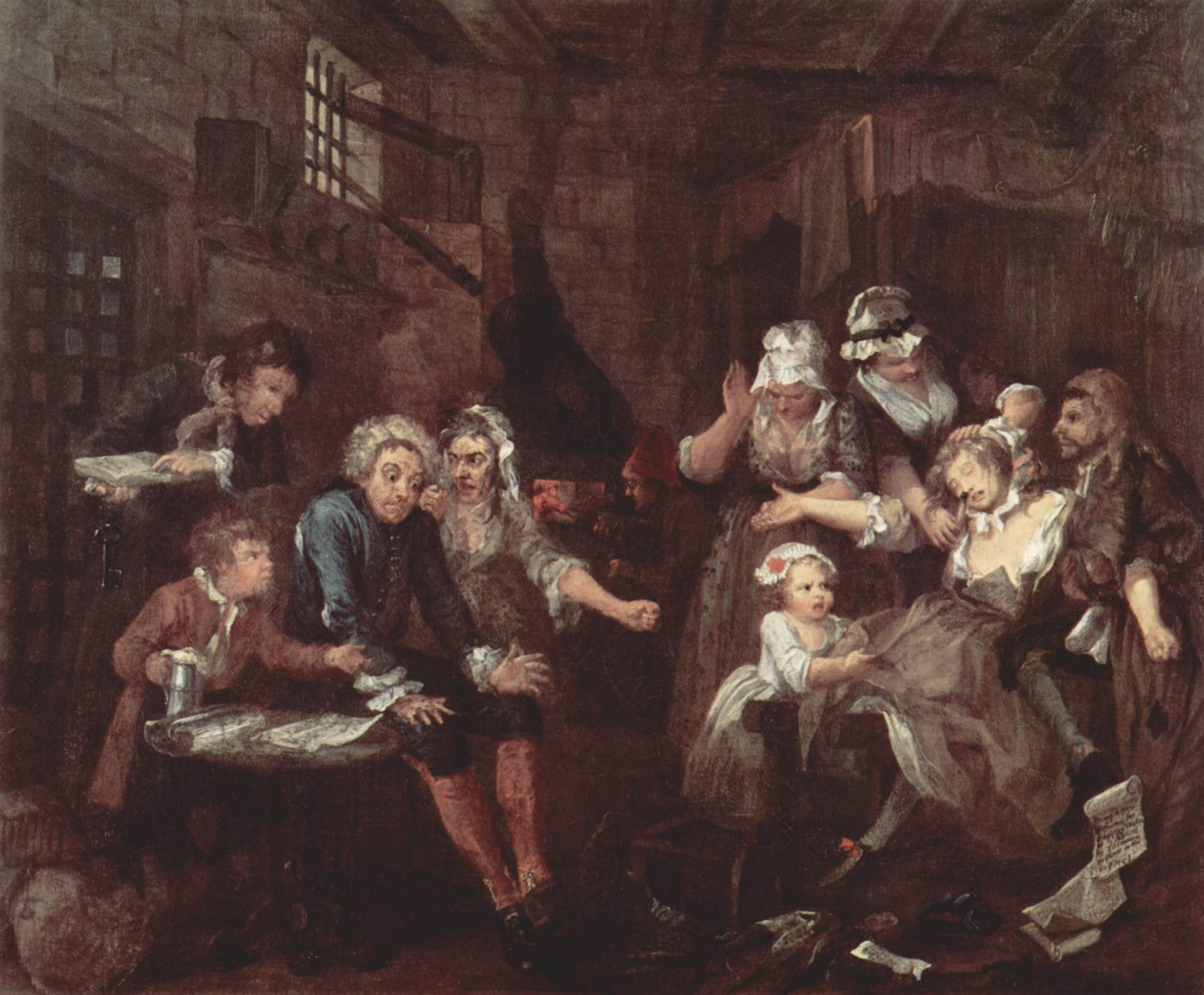
The Prison

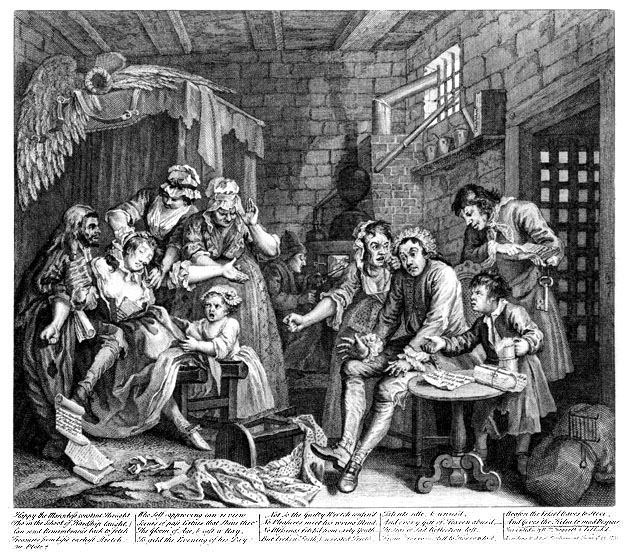
The Prison (engraving)

=== VIII – The Madhouse ===
Finally insane and violent, in the eighth painting he ends his days in Bethlem Hospital (Bedlam), London's infamous mental asylum. Only Sarah Young is there to comfort him, but Rakewell continues to ignore her. While some of the details in these pictures may appear disturbing to 21st-century eyes, they were commonplace in Hogarth's day. For example, the fashionably dressed women in this last painting have come to the asylum as a social occasion, to be entertained by the bizarre antics of the inmates. In the engraving the name of the prostitute Betty Careless is shown carved into the rail of the stairs.

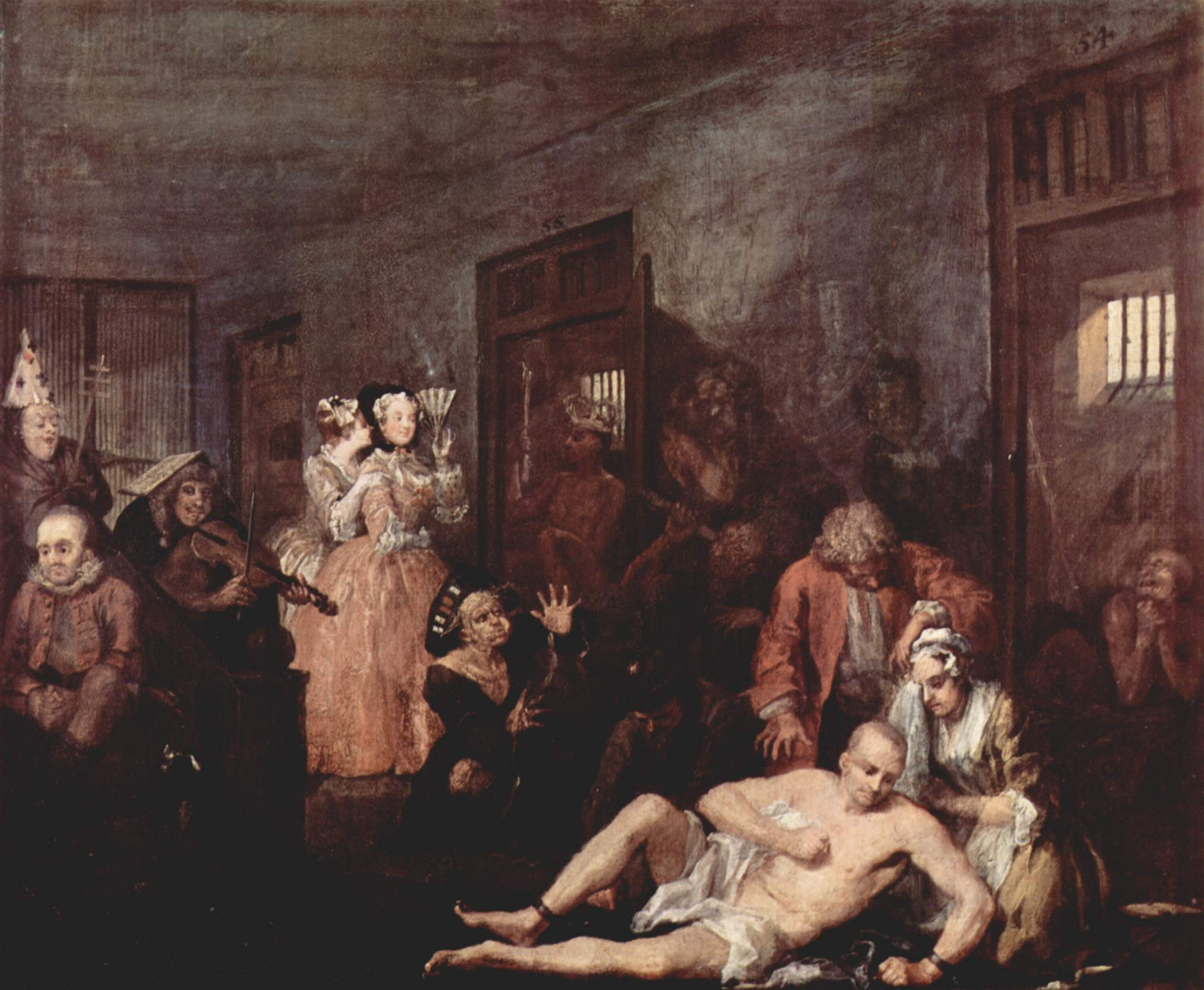
The Madhouse

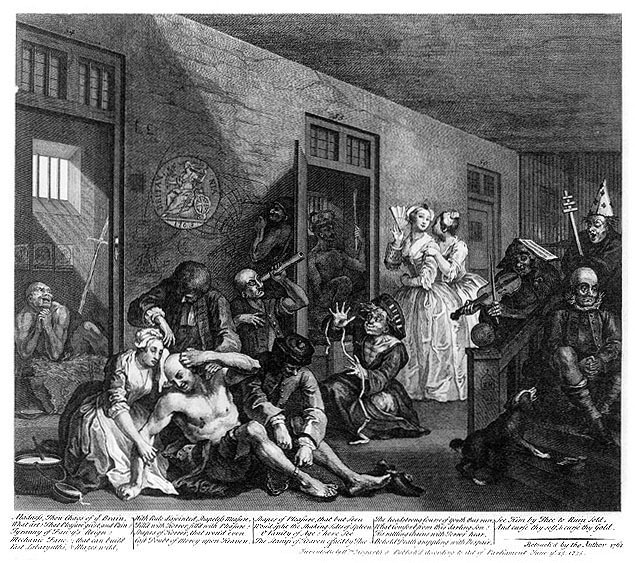
The Madhouse (engraving)

== Engravings ==
Hogarth published engravings of the paintings on 25 June 1735, the day that the Engravers' Copyright Act became law. The composition of all but the second of the engravings is reversed from the paintings, due to the printing process.

== Adaptations ==
Gavin Gordon composed a 1935 ballet titled The Rake's Progress, based directly on Hogarth's paintings. It was choreographed by Ninette de Valois, designed by Rex Whistler, has been recorded several times, and remains in the repertoires of various ballet companies.

The 1945 British comedy-drama film The Rake's Progress, released in the US as Notorious Gentleman, is loosely based on the paintings.

The 1946 RKO film Bedlam, produced by Val Lewton and directed by Mark Robson, was inspired by A Rake's Progress. Hogarth received a writing credit for the film.

Igor Stravinsky's 1951 opera The Rake's Progress, with a libretto by W. H. Auden and Chester Kallman, is loosely based on the story from Hogarth's paintings.

In 1961, David Hockney created his own print edition version of The Rake's Progress; he also created stage designs for the Stravinsky 1951 opera The Rake's Progress.

In 1991, the British progressive rock band Marillion released the album Holidays in Eden, including the track "The Rake's Progress". This is an intentional nod to the Lead Singer and Lyricist Steve Hogarth's namesake.

In 1998 the British artist Yinka Shonibare (MBE and CBE) created a series of photographic works titled A Diary of a Victorian Dandy, inspired by A Rake's Progress by Hogart.

In 2012, English artist Grayson Perry created a series of tapestries named The Vanity of Small Differences, an adaptation of Hogarth's originals.

In 2014, Ulrike Theusner created a version with eight paintings accompanied by copper engravings on the same themes.

In 2015, the British artist Henry Hudson depicted the rake in his show at the Sotheby's S2 gallery.

In 2023, Sir John Soane's Museum displayed "Visions in Porcelain: A Rake’s Progress" by Bouke de Vries, an interpretation of the paintings in eight porcelain vases, shown in various states of degradation and repair.

== See also ==
- A Harlot's Progress
- List of works by William Hogarth
