= Joseph Hudson (inventor) =

Joseph Hudson (1848–1930) was an inventor in Birmingham, England during the late 19th century and the founder of J Hudson & Co in 1870, later to become the world largest whistle manufacturer.

Hudson entered a competition held by the Metropolitan police force in London in 1883 to design a better way of attracting people's attention. He won a contract to supply the police with their new devices, a small but loud 'whistle'. Prior to this time the police force had to rely on hand rattles and whistles were only thought of as musical instruments or toys. His whistle is still used by the force and many others worldwide.

He later invented the first referee whistle for football matches, prior to this handkerchiefs were used at games. Hudson also invented the 'Acme Thunderer', the first ever pea whistle, which has been, and remains, the most used whistle in the world, from train guards to dog handlers, party goers to police officers.
