= Alfred De Courcy =

Alfred de Courcy (Alfred de Courcy, 1866–1931) was a Birmingham whistle maker from 1888 to 1927, who founded the company A de Courcy & Co. He was the largest whistle maker beside J.Hudson & Co. from 1906 until 1927, when Hudson bought out the whistle-making part of the company.

== Whistle maker ==
Whilst whistles were stamped A De Courcy, the family never capitalise the 'de' and as such Alfred is Alfred Edward de Courcy.

De Courcy made whistles for 45 years. He started working at J Hudson & Co in 1883 and became a foreman. He left to form his own whistle-making brass foundry in 1888. It is not known how he raised the money for this, as despite several sources suggesting he had an aristocratic background, he came from a semi skilled working-class family living in Hockley. He was the first of seven children of William John de Courcy and Susannah (née Ridding), the family being descended from Irish immigrants from the Cork area who came to Limehouse in London in the 1830s.

Being a skilled metal worker, de Courcy was very creative in making new designs and registering new patents for whistle construction. He was in fact the only whistle maker beside Hudson to successfully cross the heights of Victorian era into World War I and onward.

His personal connections with retailers and distributors all over the globe are well reflected in body stamps found on his whistles.

The British whistle scholar Martin Gilchrist, who wrote the three important books about whistles, was still able to meet the family descendants but unfortunately few documents remain. None of Alfred's grandchildren by his son Joseph, have any clear memories of their grandfather or his business. As they say ' in those days, as children, you never asked' Some personal photographs remain from the estate of daughter Madge, but shed no light on her father's business.

Alfred is buried alongside his wife Mary Ellen (née Condren) in the churchyard of The Abbey, Erdington.

== Patents and registered designs ==
Patent	Number	Year	Title
Patent	# 9499	1905	Call combined with a penknife
Patent	# 26019	1905	4 Piece + top fitting london style escargot-type
Patent	# 3725	1906	Diaphragm & Partition
Patent	# 924	1907	4 piece Glasgow style escargot-type
Patent	# 8452	1908	Internal strengthening pieces
Patent	# 553181	1909	Top cap shaped as a scout's hat
Patent	# 10035	1909	bosun whistle construction
Patent	# 17165	1913	Diaphragm & partition
Patent	# 20	1915	Diagphragm, stop-blank
Patent	# 101303	1916	Two-piece top
Patent	# 122572	1918	Escargot-type Body edges fold over barrel sides
Patent	# 700191	1923	Compass mounted on the call's side

== Body stamps ==
De Courcy did not stamp whistles with his company name prior to 1906 but prior to this year supplied many orders to railway, police, army, navy, asylums, fire brigades, sporting goods companies, arm distributors and hardware stores as well as for other makers as W Dowler & Sons and B Lily & Sons. Many of his whistles prior to 1906 are easily identified by shape, construction and characteristic designs.

While his business and reputation grew he first stamped whistles A De Coursy & Co. Frankfort Street Birmingham in 1906.

It would be beyond the scope of this page to list all while some are still being discovered by collectors, here are some samples:

Stamped on GSWs:

- Edinburg Police, Liverpool city police (Also marked with a crest at back), Leeds Police, Walsall Police, Westmorland Constabulary, W.R.C., Derby Borough Police, Lancashire County Constabulary
- GPO General Post Office)
- The City Patent Whistle
- The City Police
- The City Police or Fire Whistle
- Boy Scouts whistles (GSW Type) The Scout, Girl Guide, The Boy Scouts, Bukta

Stamps on Escargot-type whistles: Abbey Cyclone, The Thunderer, The Thunderer Patent, LYR, L&NWR, LMS, GNR, Army ordnance mark 1916, 1917, 1918

Stamps on Round whistles for B Lily & Sons, The assistance.

Distributors and wholesalers

T Dyke & Co. London, E. Milns & Co., Millard Bros. London, Ellis Bros Hong Kong, Marvie & Cooke Shanghai, L E Trent & Co. London, Bate & Co. B'ham, Gammage London, Henry Riely Constitution Hill Birmingham (escargot-type). Samuel Parks & Co. (Railway escargot-type)

After 1927

De Courcy stock of whistles purchased by Hudson at 1927 was restamped, thus rare whistles made by de Courcy and stamped by Hudson exist.
