= Spendthrift =

Someone who wastefully spends money beyond their means

A spendthrift (also profligate or prodigal) is someone who is extravagant and recklessly wasteful with money, often to a point where the spending climbs well beyond their means. Spendthrift derives from an obsolete sense of the word thrift to mean prosperity rather than frugality, so a "spendthrift" is one who has spent their prosperity.

Historical figures who have been characterised as spendthrifts include George IV of the United Kingdom, King Ludwig II of Bavaria, and Marie Antoinette the Queen of France.

The term is often used by news media as an adjective applied to governments who are thought to be wasting public money.

== Etymology ==
While the pair of words may seem to imply the opposite of its meaning (as if one is thrifty in one's spending), it follows the tradition of the earlier word scattergood, the first part being an undoing of the second.

== In artwork ==
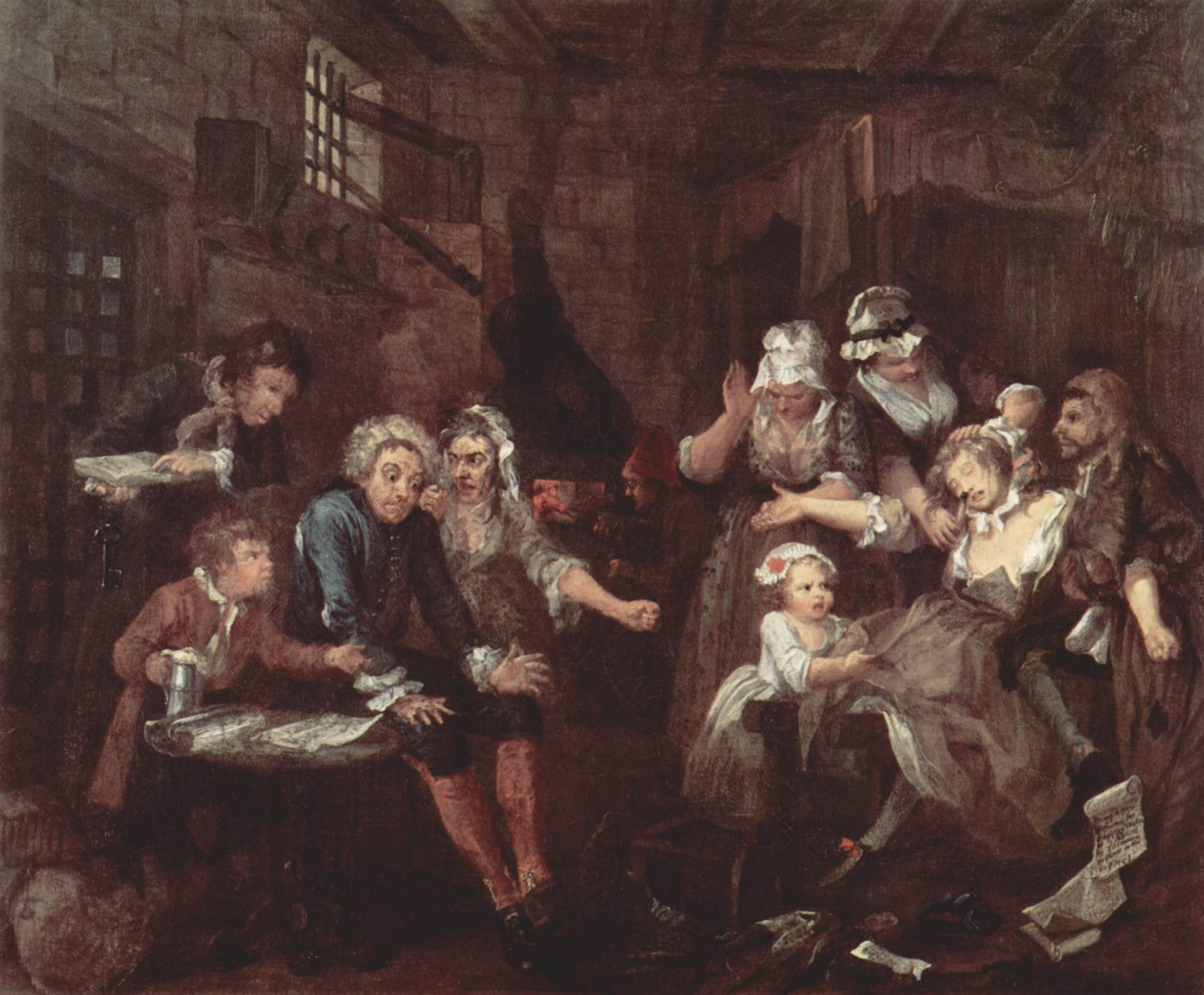
A Rake's Progress, the prison scene.

William Hogarth's A Rake's Progress (1732–33) displays in a series of paintings the spiralling fortunes of a wealthy but spendthrift son and heir who loses his money, and who as a consequence is imprisoned in the Fleet Prison and ultimately Bedlam.

== In literature ==
- The Young Man and the Swallow (which also has the Victorian title of "The Spendthrift and the Swallow") is a fable about a young man who spends all his money on gambling and luxurious living.
- Inferno (Dante) briefly describes the fate of the violently profligate. They are doomed to recklessly scramble, while being chased by vicious dogs, through the bracken of the second ring in the seventh circle of Hell, the place reserved for those who do violence against the self.

== In the Bible ==
In the Parable of the Prodigal Son, a son asks his father for his inheritance, but then squanders it recklessly as he lives a life of indulgence. With nothing left of his fortune, he is forced to work as a hired hand for a pig farmer.

== Legal issues ==
The modern legal remedy for spendthrifts is usually bankruptcy. However, during the 19th and 20th centuries, a few jurisdictions, such as the U.S. states of Oregon and Massachusetts, experimented with laws under which the family of such a person could have him or her legally declared a "spendthrift" by a court of law and placed under a court-supervised guardianship. In turn, spendthrifts were treated as lacking the capacity to enter into binding contracts. Even though such laws made life harder for creditors (who now had to bear the burden of verifying up front that any prospective debtor had not been judicially declared a spendthrift), they were thought to be justified by the public policy of keeping a spendthrift's family from ending up in the poorhouse or on welfare. As the Supreme Court of Oregon explained, the purpose of the statute is to protect the spendthrift "against his wasteful and vicious habits which expose him or are likely to expose him or his family to want or suffering or to cause any public authority to be charged for any expense for his support or that of his family". Such laws have since been abolished in favour of bankruptcy, which is more favourable to creditors.

Receivership is another equitable remedy for a spendthrift, by which a state-court-appointed trustee or attorney manages and sells the property of the debtor in default on debts.

In conservatorship, a fiduciary handles both the personal affairs and paying the debts of an incapacitated person.
