= Slide whistle =

Wind instrument with piston

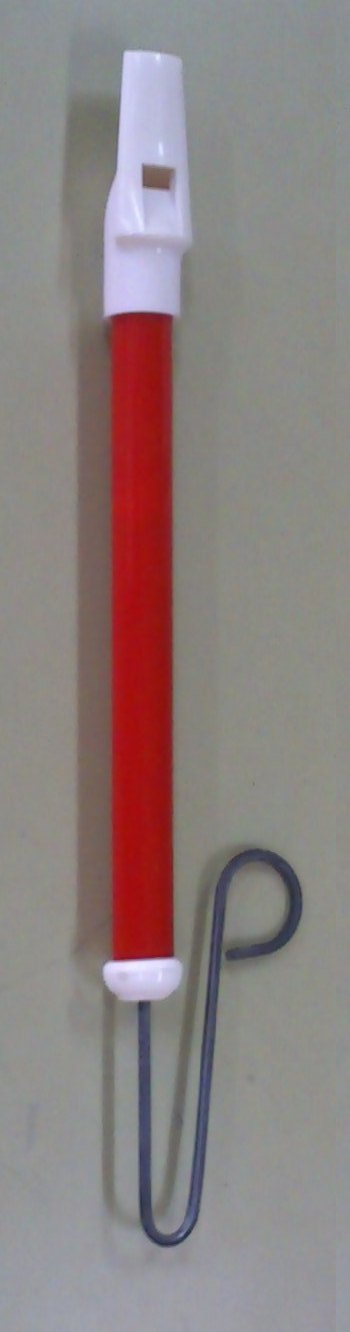
Slide whistle

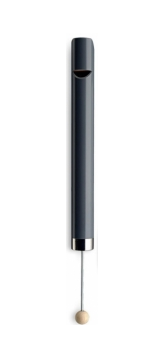

Diagram of a slide whistle. Sections: 1: mouthpiece, 2: fipple, 3: resonant cavity, 4: slide, 5: pull rod, 6: pipe.

A slide whistle (variously known as a swanee or swannee whistle, lotus flute, piston flute, or jazz flute) is a wind instrument consisting of a tube with a piston in it, and a fipple mouthpiece similar to a recorder at one end. This enables the player to vary the pitch with a slide while blowing the whistle, producing an ascending or descending glissando. Because the air column is cylindrical and open at one end and closed at the other, it overblows the third harmonic.

== History ==
Piston flutes, in folk versions usually made of cane or bamboo, existed in Africa, Asia, and the Pacific as well as Europe before the modern version was invented in England in the nineteenth century. The latter, which may be more precisely referred to as the slide or Swanee whistle, is commonly made of plastic or metal.

The modern slide whistle is familiar as a sound effect (as in animated cartoon sound tracks, when a glissando can suggest something rapidly ascending or falling, or when a player hits a "Bankrupt" on Wheel of Fortune), but it is also possible to play melodies on a slide whistle.

The swanee whistle dates back at least to the 1840s, when it was manufactured by the Distin family and featured in their concerts in England. Early slide whistles were also made by the English J Stevens & Son and H A Ward. By the 1920s the slide whistle was common in the US, and was occasionally used in popular music and jazz as a special effect. For example, it was used on Paul Whiteman's early hit recording of "Whispering" (1920). Even Louis Armstrong switched over from his more usual cornet to the slide whistle for a chorus on a couple of recordings with King Oliver's Creole Jazz Band, such as Sobbin' Blues (1923). At that time, slide saxophones, with reeds rather than a fipple, were also built. The whistle was also widely used in Jug band music of the 1920s such as Whistler's Jug Band. Gavin Gordon uses a slide whistle in his ballet The Rake's Progress (1935).

== Uses ==
Three views of a plastic slide whistle. The front end view shows the mouthpiece in dark gray with the rectangular mouthpiece aperture in white.

The slide whistle is often thought of as a toy instrument, especially in the West, though it has been and still is used in various forms of "serious" music. Its first appearance in notated European classical music may have been when Maurice Ravel called for one in his opera L'enfant et les sortilèges. More modern uses in classical music include Paul Hindemith's Kammermusik No. 1, op. 24 no. 1 (1922), Luciano Berio's Passaggio, which uses five, and the Violin Concerto of György Ligeti, as well as pieces by Cornelius Cardew, Alberto Ginastera, Hans Werner Henze, Peter Maxwell Davies, and Krzysztof Penderecki (De Natura Sonoris II, 1971). John Cage's Music of Changes (1951) and Water Music (1952) both feature slide whistle and duck calls. The slide whistle is also used in many of the works of P. D. Q. Bach.

In the 1930s through the 1950s it was played with great dexterity by Paul 'Hezzie' Trietsch, one of the founding members of the Hoosier Hot Shots. They made many recordings.

Roger Waters played two notes on the slide whistle in the song Flaming, from Pink Floyd's debut album The Piper at the Gates of Dawn.

A more recent appearance of the slide whistle can be heard in the 1979 song "Get Up" by Vernon Burch. The slide whistle segment of this song was later sampled by Deee-Lite in their 1990 hit "Groove Is in the Heart". Fred Schneider of The B-52's plays a plastic toy slide whistle in live performances of the song "Party Out of Bounds" as a prop for the song's drunken partygoer theme, in place of the trumpet thus used in the studio for the Wild Planet song.

On the popular BBC Radio 4 comedy panel game show "I'm Sorry I Haven't A Clue" the swanee whistle has been paired for comic effect with the kazoo in a musical round called "Swanee-Kazoo".

== See also ==
- Tin whistle
- Whistle
- Whistling
