= James Dixon & Sons =

Manufacturer of metalware in Sheffield, England

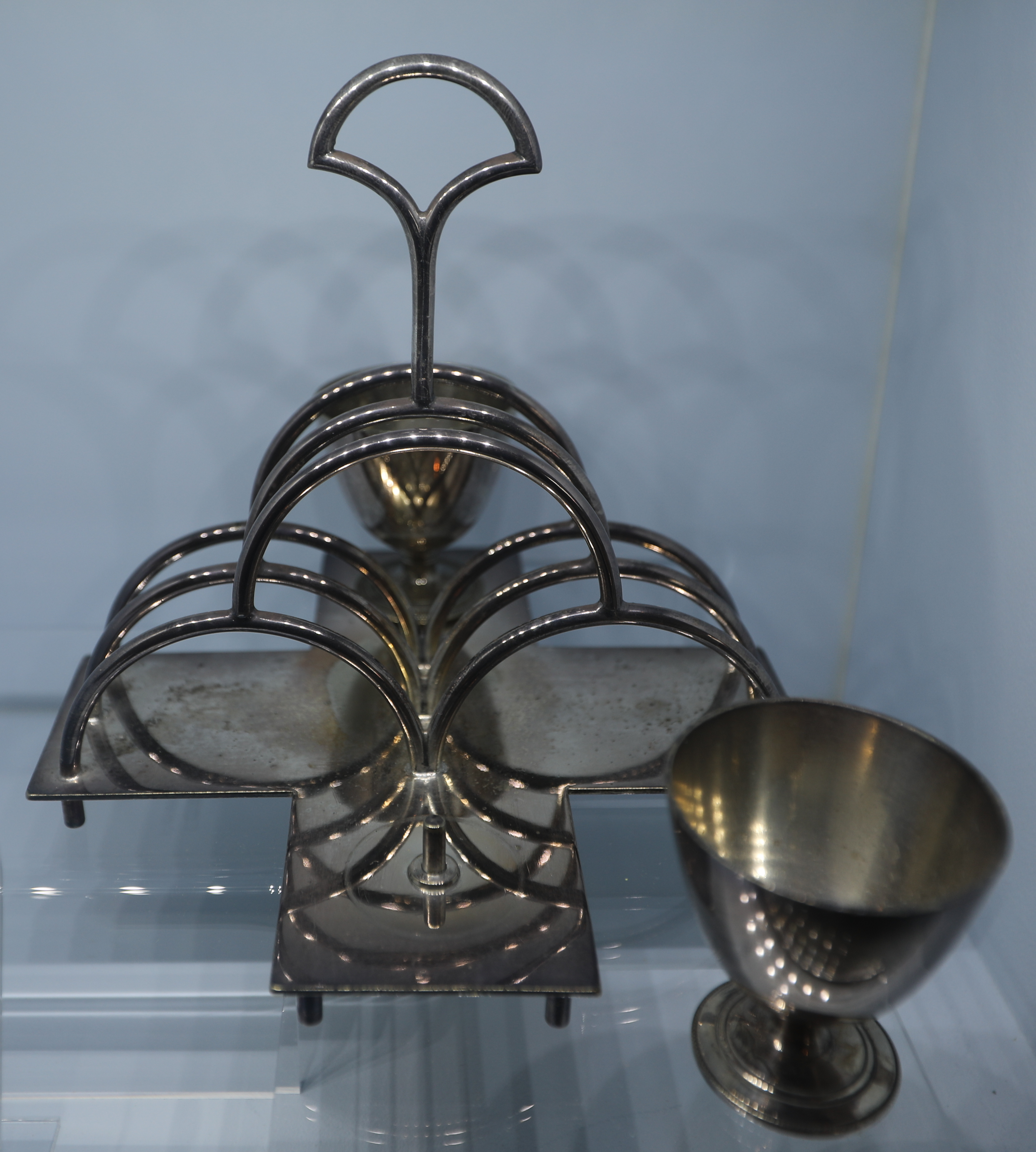
James Dixon & Sons egg cup and toast rack designed by Christopher Dresser

J Dixon & Sons (James Dixon & Sons), founded 1806 in Sheffield, was one of the major British manufacturers of the Industrial Revolution. They were manufacturers of pewterware, electroplated Britannia metal, silverware and electroplated nickel silver. Their products included hundreds of items for use in the kitchen (e.g. bowls, cutting-tools) and the dining room (e.g. tea services, cocktail shakers and mixers) as well as items such as candlesticks. They were a world leader in manufacturing shooting accessories through nineteenth century and exported powder flasks in large quantities to America, They were known as whistle makers, which like most of their products were of outstanding quality; they were one of the 4 great whistle makers, the others being W Dowler & Sons, J Stevens & Son & T Yates.

It was located first at Silver Street (1806), Cornish Place (1822) Sheffield.

Their registered trade mark since 1879 was a Trumpet with a Banner hanging from it. Although registered in 1879, the "Trumpet with Banner" logo was used at times before registration and appears on some of their silver plate pieces. They were one of the foremost names in EPNS and sterling silver tableware including silver tea services and hollowware pieces. They also made silverware serving pieces and had a wide catalogue of patterns. Their tea sets and hollowware pieces produced in silver are very valuable as antiques.

They were also famous for their sporting trophies. Two of the most well-known are the Hales Trophy commissioned in 1932 (sometimes called the Blue Riband) though this really refers to the pendant flown by the sailing ship currently holding the record for the fastest crossing of the Atlantic. The trophy was then held by the owners of that ship. The other great trophy is the one presented to the winner of the American Masters Golf tournament held annually in Augusta Georgia. This trophy is a scale model of the clubhouse made in 1959-60 and contains 453 troy ounces of silver.

The firm continued to be a family run enterprise until 1976. The patterns are currently owned by another Sheffield firm who export products mainly to the Middle East.

== Whistles ==
=== Early history ===
Whistles first appeared in a Dixon catalogue in 1883 though some of their whistles appeared in gun, rifles & sporting goods catalogs of American manufacturers & distributors as early as 1872 for [dog call]s made of Britannia metal,

Early models of Dixon horn made Round pea whistle were in use with carriage drivers & railway conductors since the 1840s and mailmen of the Post Office as early as 1850 .

=== Models, whistle types & Materials ===
Dixon manufactured whistles of sterling silver, German silver (also known as nickel silver), gun metal, Britannia metal, ivory, and horn, often using cocoa wood for fipples, A unique feature by which their round pea whistles can be identified.

Dixon models were intended mostly for outdoor sporting goods, such as hunting related dog calls, shooting gadgets combination whistles, extractors of various kinds and round whistles (in multiple sizes of over 50 different models), Beaufort whistles & double chamber type . D Dixon did not make Escargot-type whistles. It was not known that Dixon & Sons made general service whistles (GSWs) until 2006 when one was discovered.

At 1938 The family donated a collection of whistles made by Dixon to the City of Sheffield, the collection is displayed at the City Hall and pictured at a brochure about Sheffield's arm accessories makers.(See Picture in External link).

=== Body stamps ===
Most of the Dixon whistles found are not stamped, as it was not customary to stamp whistles in the earlier Victorian era, except for the ones made of sterling silver .

As a result, all of Dixon stamped whistles are very rare; the ones stamped J. Dixon & Sons are a bit less rare than the others, as is the Dixon Logo of Trumpet and Banner.

Stamps found on their whistles are: "Durham county constabulary " on Tappered round whistles, some refer to as short Beauforts. Distributors name stamps found include "C. Parker Late Merry Parker & Merry", "Merry Phipson & Parker", "C. Parker", " Priest Oxford St.", "F. Sykes", "Patstone Southampton", "Swaine & Co. London" . The stamps: "Nimrod " and " Patent No.33196 " (Moffatt's patent 11396 of 1887) are to be found on extractors and shooting gadgets as well as stamps of numbers 8, 12, & 16, showing the extractor ([cartridge puller]) gauge.

Some rare sterling silver whistles are found with the standard British silver hallmarks of the time and initials "J.D & Sons".
