= Football refereeing in England =

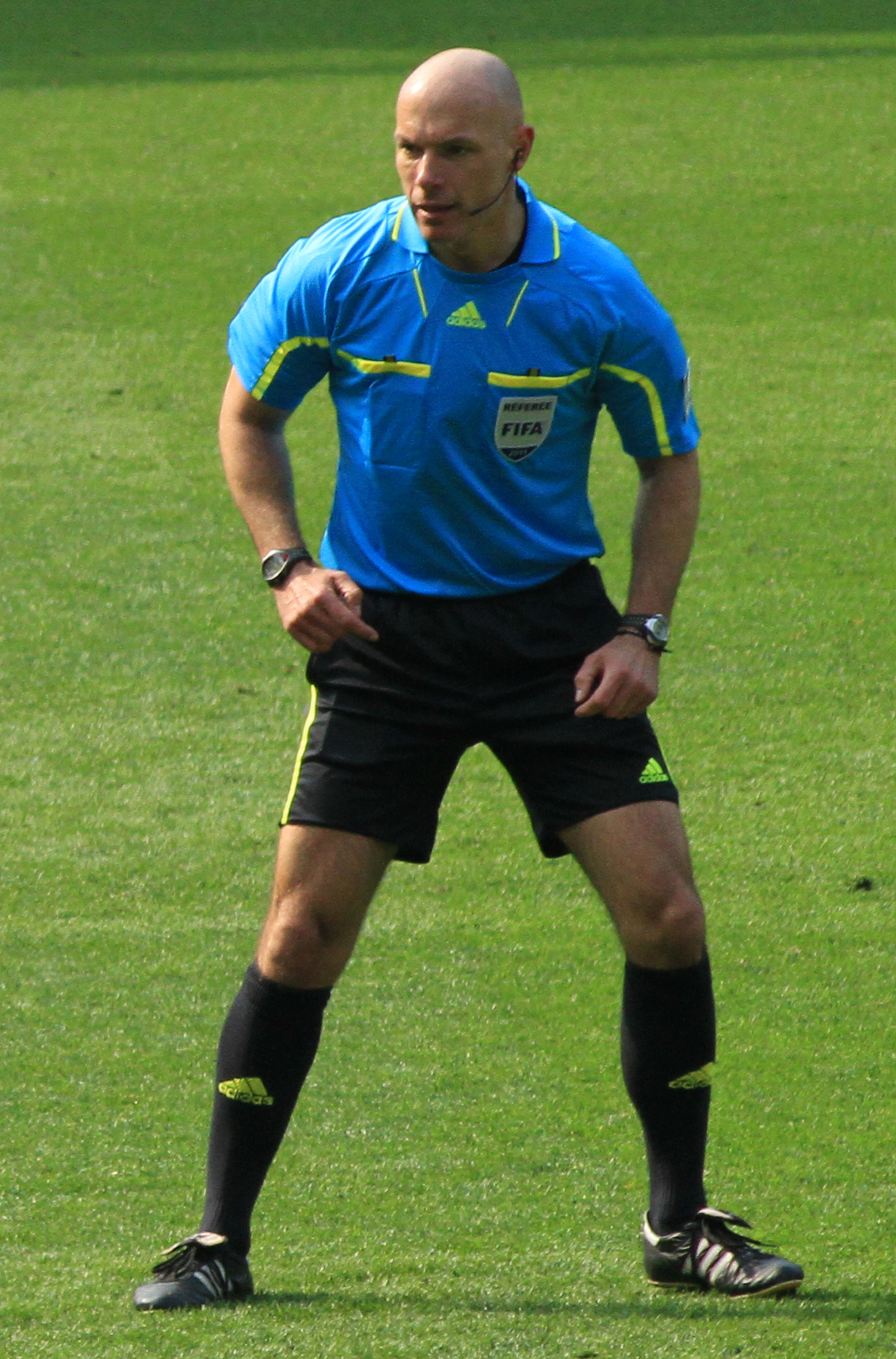
Former Premier League referee Howard Webb

English football referees officiate matches in English football. The referees officiate matches that range from local football to Premier League matches. There are currently eleven different levels of referees that correspond to the ability, age and activity of the official. For a referee to move from one level to the next, both theoretical and physical assessments are taken.

== Training ==
Anyone over the age of 14 who is reasonably fit and doesn't have poor eyesight can train to be a referee. The course is split into 5 key modules, all of which must be completed to a satisfactory level before a referee is considered qualified. The first module concentrates on the laws of association football and this is closely followed by a second module on the application of the laws. Candidates must then complete the third module which is a ninety-minute theoretical examination based on the first two modules. If this is completed successfully, the aspiring referee moves onto the fourth module. The fourth module is a probationary period in which the training referee must complete five matches as a referee. The matches need not be adult matches but can be junior or school football matches, which requires offsides to be played.

The final module consists of the candidate attending one two-hour evening session (usually on Fridays) followed by an all-day training session (on Saturdays/Sundays) run by their local football association.

== Levels ==
International	FIFA List	Split into Elite Group, First Group, Second Group & Third Group
Select Group	Professional Referee	Premier League (Referee Only)
Select Group 2	Professional Referee	EFL Championship (Referee Only)
Level 1	National List	EFL League 1 & 2 (Referee Only)
Level 2a	National League (Referee Only) or Football League (Fourth Official)	
Level 2b	National League North and National League South (Referee Only) or National League (Fourth Official) or Football League (Fourth Official)	
Level 3	Contributory Referees, National League North and National League South (Assistant Referee) or National League (Assistant referee) or Football League (Assistant referee)	
Level 4	Supply League Referees, Contributory League Assistant Referee	
Level 5	Senior County Referees, Supply League Assistant Referee	
Level 6	County Referees, Supply League Assistant Referee	
Level 7	Junior Referees, Supply League Assistant Referee	
Level Y(8)	Youth Referee	
Level 9	Trainee Referee	
Level 10	Declared non-active Referees (back garden referee)	

English football referees are categorized into 13 levels (Levels 10-1 and then 4 "elite" levels) depending on their ability, age and activity level. A level 10 referee is inactive and may have refereed at any other level prior to their self-proclaimed inactivity. Level 9 referees are currently trainee referees, and are undertaking the basic training course that all referees must pass. As part of the course, trainee referees must officiate games and they do so at this level. Upon successful completion of the course, a referee will move up to either level 8 or level 7 depending on their age. If the referees are aged under 16, they become level 8 referees; if they are 16 or over, they automatically become level 7 referees. After completing promotion criteria as a level 7 referee, they may move up to level 6. Level 8, 7 and 6 referees are qualified to officiate only games in local league matches. Level 5 referees can officiate either at local level or on Step 6 or 7 leagues on the FA pyramid.

Referees at level 5 are promoted to level 4 if they apply for further promotion, officiate a minimum of 15 matches as a referee and 10 matches as an assistant referee at suitable competitions, and achieve an average observation mark of 70 or greater. The FA also mandate a fitness test whereby they must complete an interval run, followed by a sprint test of two 50m sprints each in 7.5 seconds or less. The interval run consists of forty sets of 75m runs (maximum 17 seconds) and 25m recovery walks (maximum 22 seconds). Level 5 referees are able to act as assistant referee in supply league matches - as are level 7/6 officials (e.g. the Spartan League). Level 4 referees referee supply league matches, but also take on the role of assistant referees in contributory league matches (e.g. the Isthmian League and the Northern Premier League). Referees promoted to level 3 continue in contributory leagues and also act as assistant referees in panel leagues (Conference National, Conference North and Conference South). After 3 continuous seasons as a level 3 (assuming they have not already secured further promotion), referees are asked to choose a pathway which is either continue as a referee or become a specialist assistant referee (which comes with the greatly improved chance to officiate at the highest level as an assistant). A referee at level 3 who elects to remain as a referee after three seasons will therefore not be considered for promotion as an assistant and will only be able to assist on the National League or equivalent. A level 3 referee who has already secured promotion to level 2 as an assistant referee would therefore relinquish this position if they elected to follow the referee pathway.

Promotion to level 2 allows referees to referee panel league matches, or promotion to level 2 as an assistant to officiate in the Football League. Level one referees officiate Football League matches and further promotion can be to the Select Group (Professional Referees) who referee on the Premier League and then the three sub-levels of FIFA Referee. The highest level is FIFA Elite. International level referees appear on FIFA list of referees. They officiate in international matches depending on their seniority.

== Promotion ==
For qualified referees to be considered for promotion from level 9 to levels 7 through 4, they must apply annually and are assessed locally by their local football association, who determine the requirements for promotion that will apply to the relevant marking season (which is different to the playing season as it runs 1 March to May the following year). In some cases, referees of exceptional ability are allowed to "double jump" levels in one marking season, but must complete the criteria for both levels by certain points (e.g. a referee being considered to go from level 7 to 5 in one season will need to meet the criteria for level 6 by the end of October to be allowed to progress to level 5 by the end of the marking season). To be considered for promotion from one level to another, the local association sets the criteria which is usually a minimum number of games (all of which must be open age games) and at least three assessments (some associations require five assessments and 20 games e.g. Durham FA). The referees must also attend training conferences and complete a written exam. Should all these assessments be completed successfully and to the required standard, they are promoted to the next level.

To be promoted from level 5 to level 4, the final decision rests with The FA as the final number of level 4 referees promoted each season depends on the number of vacancies existing in each region (once promotions to higher levels, retirements and demotions to level 5 have been confirmed). Generally the final decision is based on the average assessment mark received, although other criteria may be used. Before being allowed to officiate, level 4 referees (which includes both nominated and existing level 4 referees) must complete a fitness test set out by the FA. Promotion from level 4 to level 1 (and demotions the other way) is based upon marks awarded by the teams they officiate ("club marks") and the marks from assessors, with referees at the top of both club and assessor lists generally being considered for promotion, and for levels 3 to 1 ever more stringent fitness tests.

Individual league committees meet to discuss who is to be recommended for promotion at the end of each season.

== Retention ==
Referees up to Level 5 retain their level and are not subject to any retention criteria, so even those who declares themselves inactive (thus becoming a level 10) can be reinstated at the same level once they decide to continue as a referee (and meet the criteria). Any referee who decides to no longer referee at a level higher than level 5 becomes a level 5.

For levels 4 and 3, there are active retention criteria resulting in promotion and demotion each season. The primary method for ranking referees at levels 4 and 3 is through the use of club marks and assessor marks (minimum 5 matches), with referees ranked in both from A (best) to E (lowest). Referees who achieve "AA" are therefore considered the best by both assessors and clubs and are generally considered for promotion, likewise referees at "EE" are at risk of demotion. There are further criteria which include a referee who appears in the bottom levels of either club or assessor marks over two continuous seasons being considered for demotion, and referees are also judged on availability, fitness and administration (although these are not marked). Referees receive their bandings midway through the season so that they are aware of where they are, and the final bandings are collated at the end of the marking season (last day of February). Level 4 referees are exempt from demotion in their first season, except in exceptional circumstances (e.g. availability). Ultimately, the number of referees promoted and demoted between from level 4 and above depends on the number of retirements, vacancies and regional requirements.

Above level 3, referees and assistants are assessed in every game and are not subject to the same retention criteria, although demotion is possible
