= Gavin Gordon (composer) =

Scottish singer, actor, and composer (1901–1970)

Gavin Gordon (24 November 1901 – 18 November 1970) was a Scottish bass singer, actor and composer, best known for his 1935 Hogarthian ballet The Rake's Progress.

== Biography ==
Gavin Gordon was born in Ayr, Scotland in 1901, as Gavin Muspratt Gordon Brown. He went to Rugby School then studied music at the Royal College of Music in London under Ralph Vaughan Williams and other teachers.

His ballets A Toothsome Morsel (1930), Regatta (1931), The Death of Hector and The Scorpions of Ysit (1932) did not remain in the repertory. More lasting fame, however, was accorded to The Rake's Progress (1935), based on the sequence of seven pictures by William Hogarth known as A Rake's Progress. His ballet suite Les Noces Imaginaires has been issued on a Heritage label CD, played by the BBC Concert Orchestra, conducted by Barry Wordsworth.

Gavin Gordon also wrote some orchestral works, including parodies of old-style dances such as Four Caricatures and Work in E major. There are also a series of pantomimes with music, written in collaboration with V.C. Clinton-Baddeley, and incidental music for the play The Man Behind the Statue, based on Simón Bolívar, written by Peter Ustinov and directed by Robert Donat.

As a singer, he appeared in the stage production of My Fair Lady.

Gavin Gordon died in London in 1970, aged 68.

== Sources ==
- Grove's Dictionary of Music and Musicians, 5th ed, 1954
- Bruce R. Schueneman, William Emmett Studwell: Minor ballet composers: biographical sketches of sixty-six underappreciated composers
