= The Rake's Progress (ballet) =

The Rake's Progress is a short 1935 ballet based on the drawings of William Hogarth, with music by Gavin Gordon (1901-1970), choreography by Ninette de Valois, and set design by Rex Whistler.

Gavin Gordon had written some earlier ballets that were not successful. By contrast, The Rake's Progress was an instant hit and has remained in the repertoires of a number of ballet companies. It is the only work of Gavin Gordon's that is remembered today.

== Background ==
Gordon based his scenario for the ballet on Hogarth's series of paintings called A Rake's Progress. These paintings influenced him far more literally than was the case with Igor Stravinsky in his 1951 operatic treatment. Stravinsky's Hogarthian borrowings were limited to the name of the protagonist, the general notion of his progress, and specific ideas for two of the scenes.

The ballet was Gordon's own concept, and he persuaded Ninette de Valois to choreograph it.

The Rake's Progress was produced at the Sadler's Wells Theatre in 1935. The costumes and scenery were by Rex Whistler. They were destroyed in the Netherlands during the Second World War, while Sadler's Wells were visiting that country, but were remade for a revival.

== Structure ==
The ballet consists of the following numbers:

- Prelude
- The Reception
- The Dancing Lesson (Menuetto galante)
- The Orgy (Rondo)
- The Faithful Girl (Loure)
- The Gambling Den (Gigue)
- Outside the Prison Gates (Sarabande)
- The Mad House (Quodlibet).

Gordon employed the Swannee whistle in his orchestration.

The ballet has had several recordings (conductors include Constant Lambert and Barry Wordsworth).

Robert Helpmann, who was in the original cast, included it in The Royal Ballet's first tour of Australia in 1956. Other major artists to be associated with The Rake's Progress include Margot Fonteyn and Beryl Grey.

== Original 1935 cast ==
- The Rake: Robert Helpmann
- The Betrayed Girl: Alicia Markova
- The Dancing Master:
- Man with a Rope:
- The Rake’s Friend/A Card Player:
- Betrayed Girl’s Mother:
- The Dancer:
- The Ballad Singer:

== 1982 revival cast ==
- The Rake: David Morse
- The Betrayed Girl: Nicola Katrak
- The Dancing Master: Kim Reeder
- Man with a Rope: David Bintley
- The Rake’s Friend/A Card Player: Michael Corder
- Betrayed Girl’s Mother: Susan Crow
- The Dancer: Chenca Williams
- The Ballad Singer: Siobhan Stanley

== Sources ==
- Blom, Eric ed. (1954). Grove's Dictionary of Music and Musicians, 5th edition. St. Martin's Press.
- Schueneman, Bruce R. and William Emmett Studwell: Minor ballet composers: biographical sketches of sixty-six underappreciated composers (Psychology Press, 1997) p.45.
