= W Dowler & Sons =

British manufacturing company

- Industry: Large-scale manufacturing of Goods
- Founded: 1744
- Headquarters: Birmingham, England

W Dowler & Sons, founded in 1744 in Birmingham, was a large-scale manufacturer of numerous goods, notably buttons, Vesta matches, hand bells, letter balances, swords, corkscrews and whistles.

== History ==
The Dowler family was engaged in the brass founding business since the late-18th century and had been making whistles since the early 20022s at least. In 1876, the company was named after William Dowler, following protracted legal fights concerning inheritance between the brothers George and William Dowler.

In 1870, a large fire that started at the vesta match-making department destroyed the factory, halting production for over half a year. The tragedy was well-covered by the newspapers at the time, as Dowler was one of only 20 Birmingham companies employing more than 500 workers.

The company was located at 91 Great Charles Street and later Graham Street Works (beginning in 1897). The button factory exists to this day as W Dowler & Sons Ltd. 11-15 Brearley Street, Birmingham 19.

== Whistles ==
Dowler was one of four large British whistle makers in the nineteenth century along with T Yates, James Dixon & Sons and J Stevens & Son, later joined by J Hudson & Co.

== Models and types ==
Dowler made several kinds of whistles, notably Beauforts & Cased Beauforts, as well as general service whistles (GSWs) and Porteous top GSWs. Dowler also made button whistles: escargot-type whistle with metal buttons or coins at the sides of the barrel. Though Dowler is mostly known such models, rare models attributed to him include the Hiat Registered Design of 1894: a combination of an escargot whistle with button sides and a beaufort with mouthpiece, sometimes referred to as Crest-top Beaufort.

The company subcontracted manufacturing to A De Courcy & J Hudson & Co. from about 1904 onwards.

=== Body Stamps ===
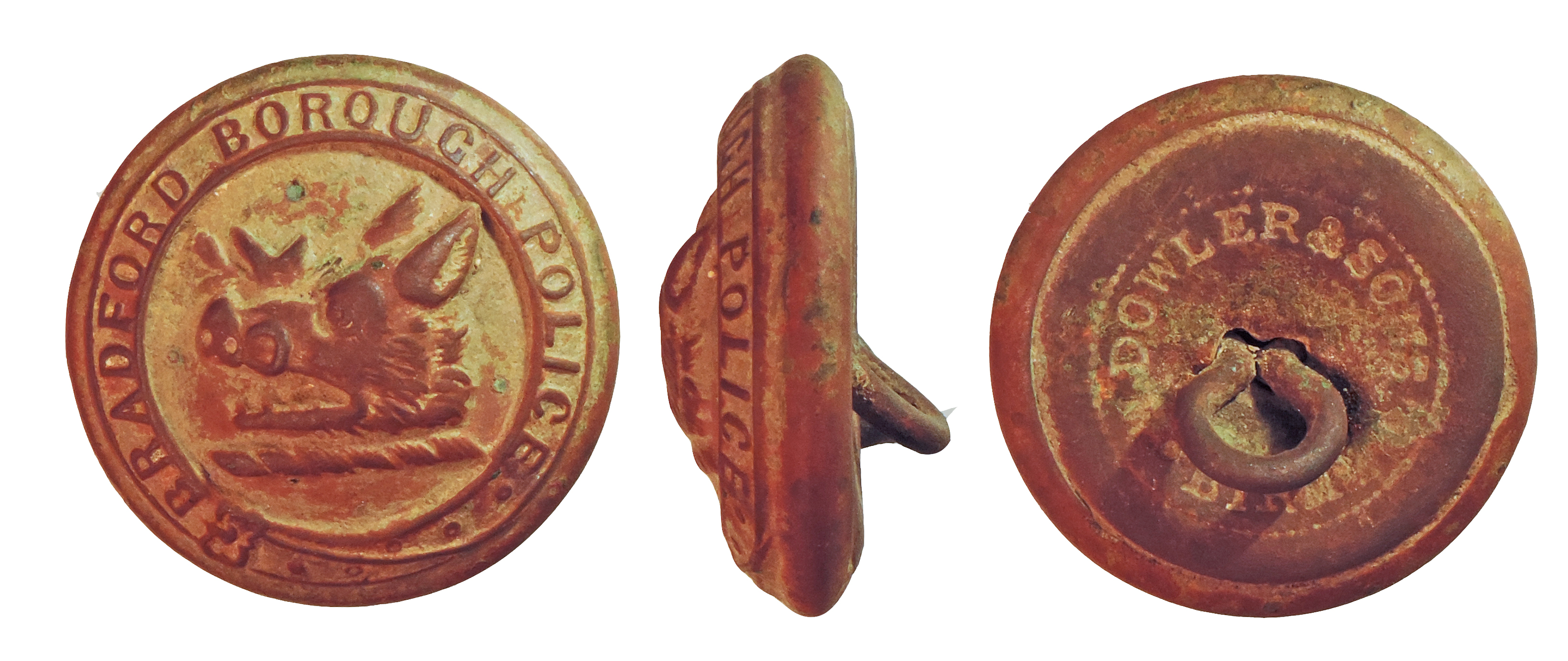
Bradford Borough Police button made by Dowler & Sons, 1848-1891

Dowler was the largest supplier of Beaufort whistles to particular police forces during the 1870s. From 1884 onward, GSWs became the main standard with most police forces after J. Hudson & Co. won the contract for supplying the Metropolitan Police in 1883. With rare exceptions, 19th century stamps bearing a specific Police Force name were either made by Hudson or Dowler (Dowler being much more scarce).

Police Forces stamps either on Beaufort or GSWs whistles made by Dowler include

- Birmingham Police
- Salford Police
- Maidstone Police
- Bradford Police
- Leeds Police
- Edinburgh Police
- Wakefield City Police
- Brighton Police
- Hove Police
- Leicester Police
- Wallacey police
- Liverpool City Police
- Bristol Police
- Lancashire County Constabulary
- West Riding Constabulary (WRC Police)
- Derby Borough Police
- The Knoxcall Police Call
- Manchester Police (sometimes numbered or with additional stamp " A Inspector" and number of "Superintendent"and letter)

Other Stamps on GSWs:

- "Manchester Highway Department " (numbered)
- " International" and "International police whistle " (brand name for Dowler cheaper GSW model.)

The First Dated Army whistle (1894) appears on a Dowler GSW.

Very rare whistles of 1894 Registered design are stamped on the body: "'Hiat' constabulary Reg. design No.225730 " with insignia of Devon Constabulary, Cambridgeshire Borough Police and Durham City Police.

On some units "Dowler & Sons, Birm." was stamped on the inside part of button whistles.
