= Referee (association football) =

Game administrator in association football

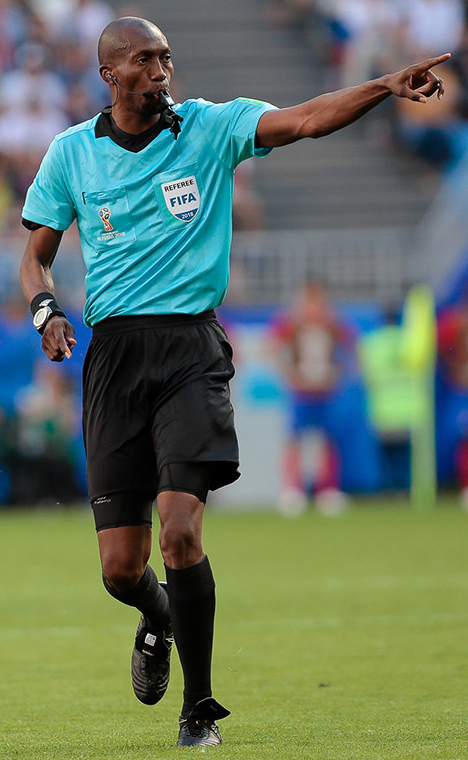
Malang Diedhiou refereeing during a 2018 World Cup match

In association football, the referee is the person responsible for interpreting and enforcing the Laws of the Game during a match. The referee is the final decision-making authority on all facts connected with play, and is the match official with the authority to start and stop play and impose disciplinary action against players and coaches during a match.

At most levels of play, the referee is assisted by two assistant referees (formerly known as linesmen), who advise the referee on whether the ball leaves the playing area and any infringements of the Laws of the Game occurring outside of the view of the referee. The final decision on any decision of fact rests with the referee, who has authority to overrule an assistant referee. At higher levels of play, the referee may also be assisted by a fourth official who supervises the teams' technical areas and assists the referee with administrative tasks, and, at the very highest levels, additional assistant referees and/or video assistant referees. Referees and other game officials are licensed and trained by its member national organisations.

== Powers and duties ==
The referee carries a yellow card and a red card, to indicate, respectively, a caution for misconduct and to send off a player. The coloured cards were introduced by Ken Aston, a former chair of the FIFA Refereeing Committee.

The referee's powers and duties are described by Law 5 of the Laws of the Game. The referee:

Overall
- enforces the Laws of the Game
- controls the match in cooperation with the other match officials
- acts as timekeeper, keeps a record of the match and provides the appropriate authorities with a match report, including information on disciplinary action and any other incidents that occurred before, during or after the match
- supervises and/or indicates the restart of play

Advantage
- allows play to continue when an offence occurs and the non-offending team will benefit from the advantage, and penalises the offence if the anticipated advantage does not ensue at that time or within a few seconds

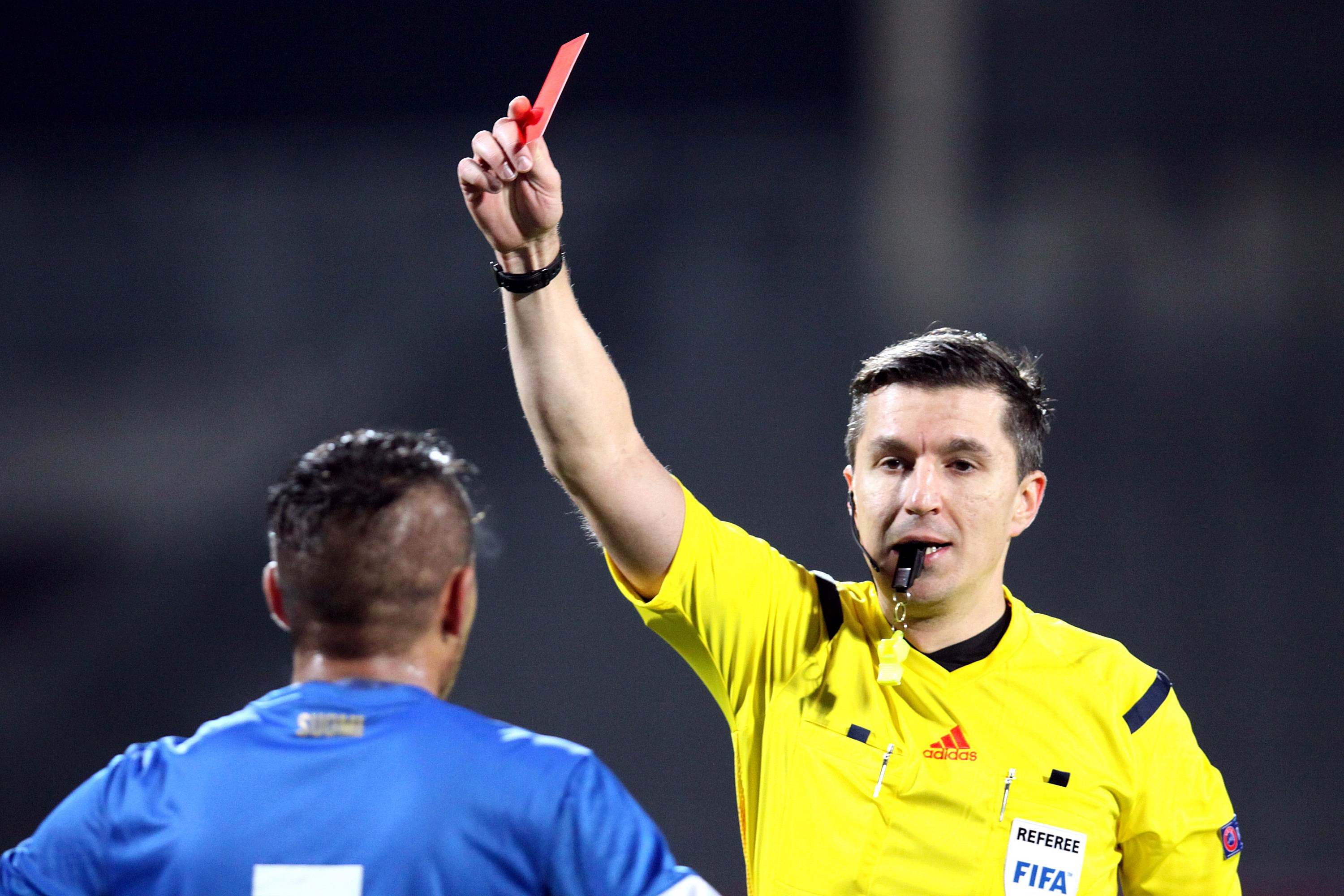
Referee Bojan Pandžić showing a red card to Finland under-21 player Moshtagh Yaghoubi.

Disciplinary action
- punishes the more serious offence, in terms of sanction, restart, physical severity and tactical impact, when more than one offence occurs at the same time
- takes disciplinary action against players guilty of cautionable and sending-off offences
- has the authority to take disciplinary action from entering the field of play for the pre-match inspection until leaving the field of play after the match ends (including kicks from the penalty mark). If, before entering the field of play at the start of the match, a player commits a sending-off offence, the referee has the authority to prevent the player taking part in the match (see Law 3.6); the referee will report any other misconduct
- has the power to show yellow or red cards and, where competition rules permit, temporarily dismiss a player, from entering the field of play at the start of the match until after the match has ended, including during the half-time interval, extra time and kicks from the penalty mark
- takes action against team officials who fail to act in a responsible manner and warns or shows a yellow card for a caution or a red card for a sending-off from the field of play and its immediate surrounds, including the technical area; if the offender cannot be identified, the senior coach present in the technical area will receive the sanction. A medical team official who commits a sending-off offence may remain if the team has no other medical person available, and act if a player needs medical attention
- acts on the advice of other match officials regarding incidents that the referee has not seen

As well as other various duties and powers described fully in Law 5 of the Laws of the Game, pursuant to current updates.

== Regulation ==
Referees and assistant referees are regulated at a national level. FIFA requires that each national organisation establish a referees committee composed of former officials that has authority over refereeing in that territory. FIFA also mandate that referees pass tests to show sufficient physical fitness and knowledge of the Laws of the Game, as well as an annual medical. Generally, referees are required to have greater experience to officiate higher level matches (see, for example, the multiple tiers of refereeing in England). The most elite officials, those who are permitted to officiate international games, are listed on the FIFA International Referees List.

== Kit and equipment ==
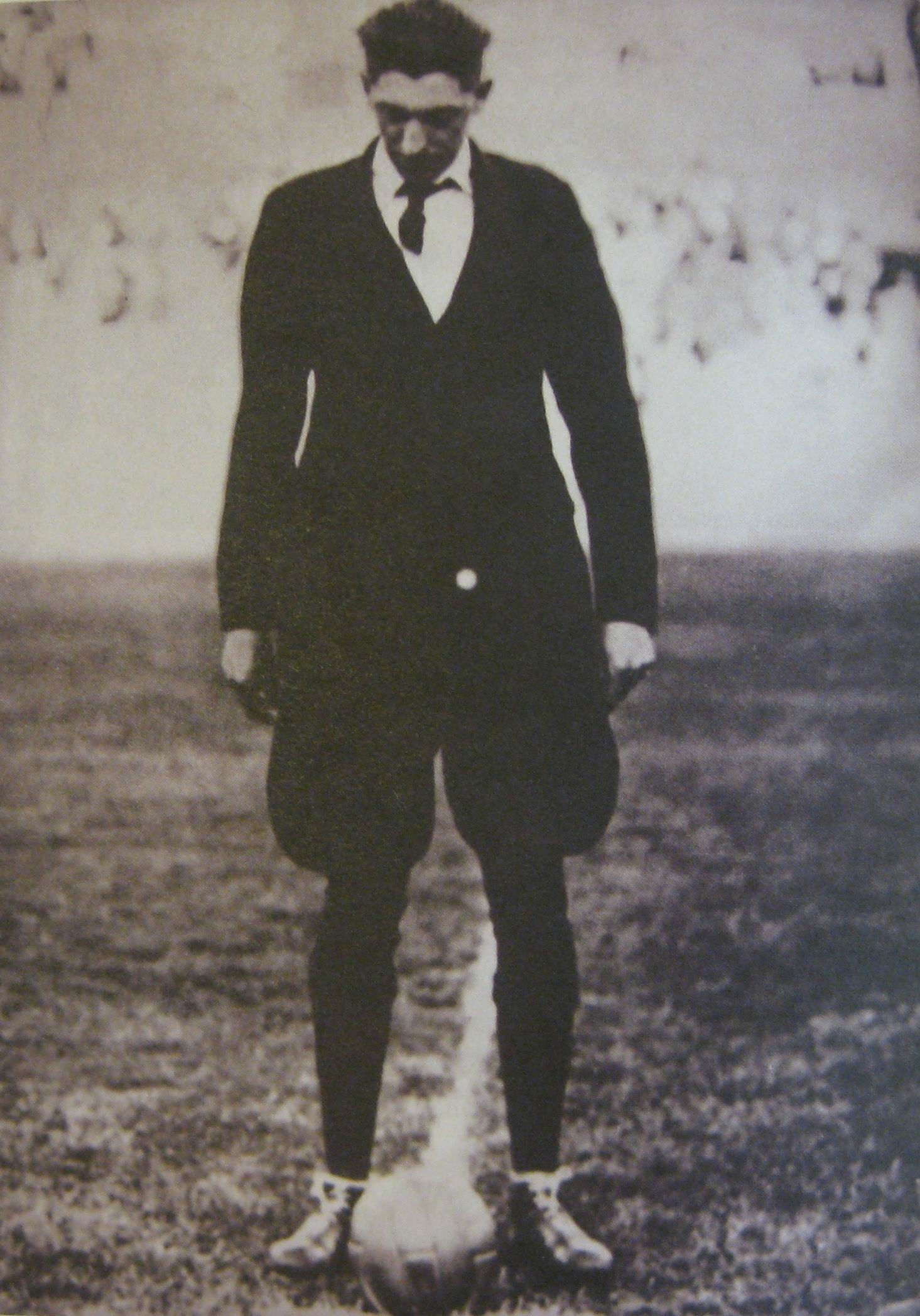
In the early 20th century, referees wore a blazer. Pictured is John Langenus refereeing the first World Cup final in 1930.

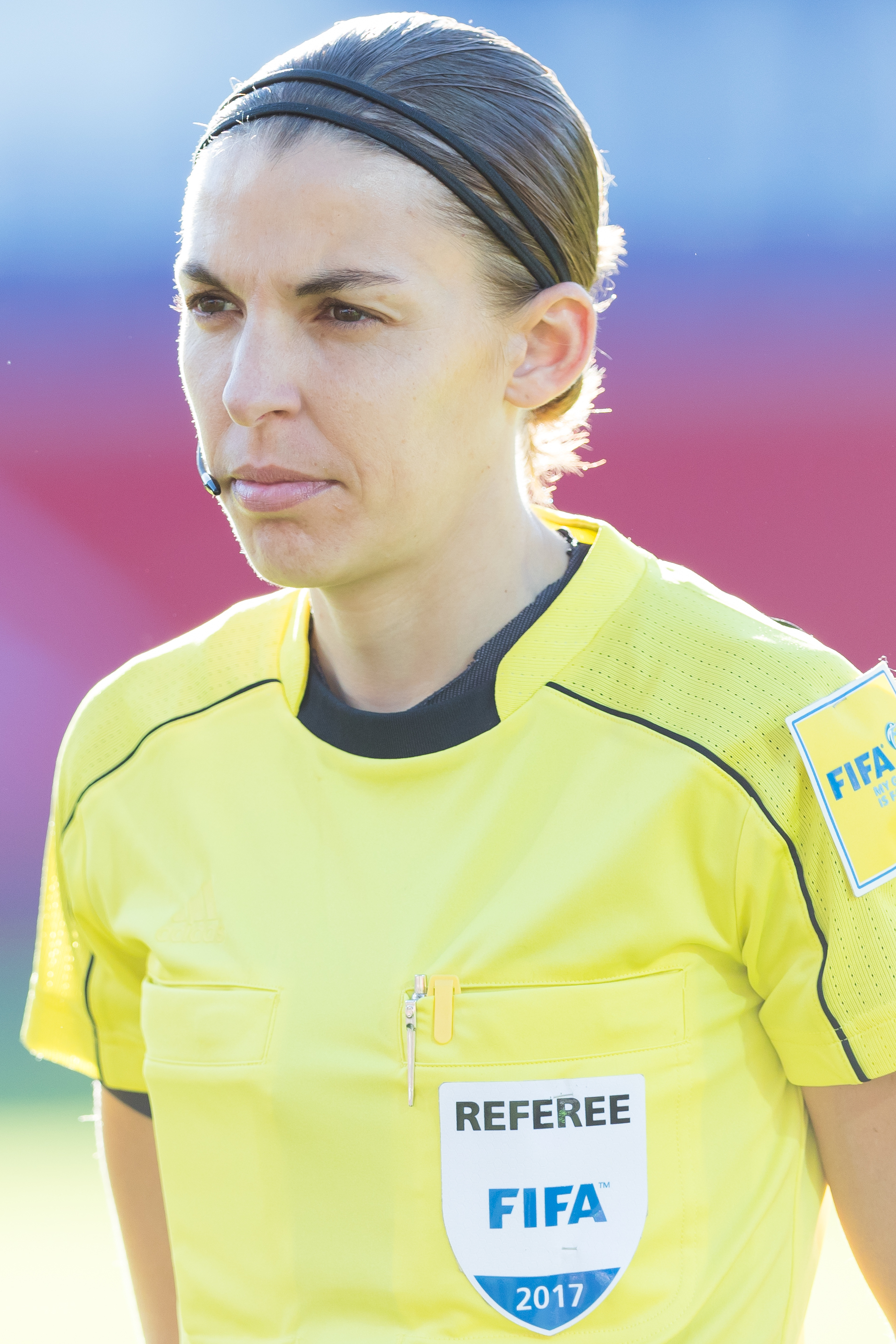
Since the 1994 FIFA World Cup, referees have been allowed to wear shirts of a different colour to the historical black. Pictured, Stéphanie Frappart wears a yellow shirt with a badge showing her licence level and year of validity.

Referees wear a kit distinguishing themselves from the players. Usually this comprises a shirt of a different colour to the players of both teams.

In the early 20th century, referees wore a blazer, but later this was changed to a shirt similar to that worn by the players. Traditionally, referees almost always wore all black, unless one of the teams was wearing a very dark shirt in which case the referee would wear another colour (usually red) to distinguish themself from both teams.

At the 1994 World Cup finals, new shirts were introduced that gave officials a choice of burgundy, yellow or white, and at the same time the creation of the Premier League in England saw referees wear green jerseys: both changes were motivated by television considerations. Since then, most referees have worn either yellow or black, but the colours and styles adopted by individual associations vary greatly. For international contests under the supervision of FIFA, Adidas uniforms are worn because Adidas is the current sponsor. FIFA allows referees to wear five colours: black, red, yellow, green and blue. Along with the jersey, referees are required to wear black shorts, black socks (with white stripes in some cases), and black shoes. The badge, which displays the referee's license level and year of validity, is often affixed to the left chest pocket.

All referees carry a whistle, a watch, penalty cards, a data wallet with pen and paper, and a coin for determining which team has the choice of ends or kick-off. Most are encouraged to have more than one of each on them in case they drop a whistle or a pen runs out and so on. Often, referees use two watches so that they can use one to calculate time lost for stoppages for the purposes of added time. At the highest levels, referees wear a full duplex radio with customised headset to communicate with their assistants, and assistant referees use electronic flags, which send a signal to the referee when a button is pushed. In matches with goal-line technology, referees will have on their person a device to receive the system's alerts.

=== Whistle ===
Referees use a whistle to help them control the flow of matches. The whistle is sometimes needed to stop, start or restart play but should not be used for all stoppages, starts or restarts. FIFA's Laws of the Game document gives guidance as to when the whistle should and will always not be used. Overuse of the whistle is discouraged since, as stated in the Laws, "A whistle which is used too frequently unnecessarily will have less impact when it is needed." The whistle is an important tool for the referee along with verbal, body and eye communication.

Before the introduction of the whistle, referees indicated their decisions by waving a white handkerchief. The whistles that were first adopted by referees were made by Joseph Hudson at Mills Munitions in Birmingham, England. The Acme Whistle Company (based at Mills Munitions Factory) first began to mass-produce pea whistles in the 1870s for the Metropolitan Police Force. It is frequently stated the referee's whistle was first used in a game between Nottingham Forest and Sheffield Norfolk in 1878; however the last such fixture known to have taken place between the two clubs was in 1874. The Nottingham Forest account book of 1872 apparently recorded the purchase of an "umpire's whistle" and in 1928 an article by R M Ruck about his playing days in the early 1870s referred to the use of a whistle by umpires to indicate an infringement.

The whistle was not mentioned in the Laws of the Game until 1936 when an IFAB Decision was added as footnote (b) to Law 2, stating "A Referee's control over the players for misconduct or ungentlemanly behaviour commences from the time he enters the field of play, but his jurisdiction in connection with the Laws of the Game commences from the time he blows his whistle for the game to start."

In 2007, when IFAB greatly expanded the Laws of the Game, an Additional Instructions section became available, which is a full page of advice on how and when the whistle should be used as a communication and control mechanism by the referee.

== History ==
Referees in football were first described by Richard Mulcaster in 1581. In this description of "foteball" he advocates the use of a "judge over the parties". In the modern era, referees are first advocated in English public school football games, notably Eton football in 1845. A match report from Rochdale in 1842 shows their use in a football game between the Bodyguards Club and the Fearnought Club.

In the early years of the codified sport it was assumed that disputes could be adequately settled by discussion between gentlemen players who would never deliberately commit a foul. However, as play became more competitive, the need for officials grew. Initially there existed two umpires, one per team, who could be appealed to with the referee (the game's timekeeper) being "referred" to if the umpires could not agree.

The promotion of referees to the dominant position they occupy today, and the reformation of umpires into the linesmen role, occurred as part of a major restructuring of the laws in 1891.

== Positioning and responsibilities ==
Diagram of the diagonal system of control showing the paths of the Referee (R) and the Assistant Referees (AR)

The predominant system of positioning and division of responsibility used by football match officials throughout the world is known as the "diagonal system of control" (DSC).

The referee has final decision-making authority on all matters. The referee is assisted by two assistant referees who advise the referee. An assistant referee's judgement is enforced only if the referee accepts that judgement, and the referee has the authority to unilaterally overrule an assistant referee. The referee is the only official empowered with starting and stopping play, and meting out disciplinary actions such as cautions or send-offs.

The two assistant referees are instructed by the referee to each patrol half of a single touchline on opposite sides of the field. For example, on a field running north–south, one assistant referee (AR) would run on the eastern touchline from the north goal line to the halfway line, while the other assistant referee would run on the western touchline from the south goal line to the halfway line. In general, the assistant referees' duties would be to indicate (using their flags) when an offside offence has occurred in their half, when a ball has left the pitch, and if a foul has been executed out of the view of the referee (typically in their quadrant of the field). Generally, the ARs will position themselves in line with either the second to last opponent or the ball – whichever is closer to the goal line – to better judge offside infractions. However, the assistant referee will have specific positioning with respect to corner kicks, penalty kicks, and throw-ins.

The referee patrols the length of the field to cover the ground not covered by their two assistants, generally running in a diagonal pattern from the southeast quadrant of the field towards the northwest quadrant; hence the term "diagonal system of control" (DSC). This pattern is not a specific route but a general guideline that should be modified to the style of play, nature of the game, the location of play at a given time, etc. In some cases the referee may even exit the field if it aids in their decision-making ability. The main idea is that the referee and assistants using the DSC should be able to position themselves quickly and easily to observe the important aspects of play (offside, ball in or out of play, goal-scoring opportunities, challenges for the ball) from multiple angles with multiple sets of eyes.

The description above refers to a left diagonal system of control, known as "running a left" or "standard diagonal". If, before the match, the centre referee on this field decides to run from southwest to northeast, then the assistants must position themselves accordingly and the result will be a right diagonal system of control, otherwise referred to as "running a right" or "reverse diagonal".

In many cases in England, referees use more of "curve" based on a line running from the edge of the 18-yard (16 m) box, and when near the centre circle they then curve to a line level with the other 18-yard (16 m) box line. This is similar to the diagonal system, but with the speed of modern football it is easier to keep up with play. This also helps the referee avoid being in a common "passing lane" through the centre circle itself.

In international matches the left-wing diagonal shown above has been universal since the 1960s. It is now predominant across the world. England until recently was an exception to this convention. Until 1974 referees in the Football League were required to run both diagonals during a match, most opting to run from right wing to right wing in the first half before switching to the left-wing diagonal for the second half. The chief reason for this alternation was to avoid linesmen wearing down the same part of the touchline during matches – this was important given the generally lower quality of pitches at the time. However switching diagonal was also justified in terms of allowing officials to patrol different areas of the field during games. From the 1974–75 season English referees were allowed to run the same diagonal throughout the same match. Most initially opted for the right-wing diagonal although over the years the left-wing diagonal became increasingly popular and the preferred choice of most referees by the early 2000s. From 2007–08 the left-wing diagonal has been mandatory in English professional football although some referees at lower levels still use the opposite approach.

Its implementation as a standard practice for referees is attributed to Sir Stanley Rous, former referee and President of FIFA from 1961 to 1974.

== Other systems of control ==
While the Laws of the Game mandate a single referee with assistants as described above, other systems are used experimentally or explicitly by some non-FIFA-affiliated governing organizations.

=== Dual system (two referees) ===
The dual system employs two referees with no assistants. The system is used some matches played under the rules of the National Federation of State High School Associations (NFHS) in the United States, and in other youth and amateur adult matches unsanctioned by U.S. Soccer. Both referees have equal authority, and the decisions of one referee are binding on the other. Each referee is primarily responsible for a specific area of the field similar to those of the assistant referees in the diagonal system, except that the referees are allowed and encouraged to move away from the touch line into the field, particularly as play approaches the goal lines. Like the assistant referees in the diagonal system, each referee is responsible for patrolling one touch line and one goal line and determining possession for the restart if the ball goes out of play on either of those two boundaries.

Positioning in the dual system is similar to that used by officials in basketball: each referee is either termed the "lead" or the "trail", depending on the direction of the attack. If the attack is against the goal to the referee's right (when facing the field from their assigned touch line), then that referee is the lead, and the other is the trail. The lead is positioned ahead of the play, even with the second-to-last defender to the extent possible, while the trail is positioned behind the play. Both are responsible for calling fouls and misconduct and determining the restart when the ball goes out of play on one of their assigned boundary lines. Since the lead is in a better position to determine offside, the lead is responsible for calling offside, while the trail provides an extra monitor for fouls and misconduct while the lead's attention is focused on offside. When the attack changes direction, the trail becomes the lead and vice versa.

=== Double dual system (three referees) ===
The double dual system employs three referees, all equipped with whistles, positioned much as in the traditional diagonal system of control mandated by IFAB. Each referee has the same authority for decision making. It is authorized in the United States by NFHS for high school matches, although it is rarely used. In 2026, Pennsylvania moved away from the double dual system in favor of the traditional diagonal system of control.

== See also ==
- List of FIFA international referees
- Assistant referee (association football)
- Fouls and misconduct (association football)
- FIFA World Cup referees
- FA Cup Final referees
- Football refereeing in England
