= War crime (disambiguation) =

War crime is a serious violation of the laws of war.

War crime or War crimes may also refer to:

- War Crimes (film), 2005
- War Crimes (short story collection), a 1979 collection of short stories by Peter Carey
- War Crimes (The West Wing), season 3
- "War Crimes", a song from Waterparks' 2019 album, Fandom
- "World of Warcraft: War Crimes" a 2014 book by Christie Golden

== See also ==
- List of war crimes
