= Bliss (novel) =

1981 novel by Peter Carey

- First edition (Australia)
- Author: Peter Carey
- Language: English
- Publisher: UQP (Australia); Faber and Faber (UK); Harper & Row (US)
- Publication date: 1981
- Publication place: Australia
- Media type: Print (Hardback & Paperback)
- Pages: 336 (first edition, hardback)
- ISBN: 0-571-11769-4 (first edition, hardback)
- OCLC: 8075118
- Followed by: Illywhacker

Bliss is the first novel by Australian writer Peter Carey. Published in 1981, the book won that year's Miles Franklin Award.

== Plot ==
Written as a dark, comic fable, the story concerns an advertising executive, Harry Joy, who briefly 'dies' of a heart attack. On being resuscitated, he realizes that the life he has previously drifted amiably through is in fact Hell – literally so to Harry. His wife is unfaithful, while his son is selling drugs, and his daughter is a communist selling herself to buy them. In one of the novel's more shocking scenes, glimpsed through a window, incest occurs.

Redemption comes in the form of Honey Barbara – a pantheist, healer and prostitute. In the words of the book's blurb "Honey is to Harry as Isis is to Osiris. Together they conquer Hell and retire to the forest where their children inherit the legend of paradise regained." But Harry must die for a second time to be truly saved.

== Adaptations ==
In 1985 Bliss was adapted into a film of the same name, directed by Ray Lawrence and starring Barry Otto.

Commissioned by Opera Australia, Brett Dean and Amanda Holden wrote an opera of the same name, which premiered in March 2010 at the Sydney Opera House, directed by Neil Armfield, conducted by Elgar Howarth, and featuring Peter Coleman-Wright as Harry Joy.

Tom Wright adapted in 2018 a stage version for the Malthouse Theatre, Melbourne, and the Belvoir, Sydney.

Australian singer-songwriter James Gabriel Keogh took his stage name Vance Joy from Harry Joy's grandfather in this novel.

== Awards ==
- Miles Franklin Award, 1981
- New South Wales Premier's Literary Awards, Fiction, 1982
- National Book Council Award for Australian Literature, 1982

== See also ==
- 1981 in Australian literature
- Bliss, Libraries Australia authorities record
- Mark Roberts review of Bliss from Going Down Swinging magazine, issue 5, Spring 1982
