= His Illegal Self =

2008 novel by Peter Carey

- Author: Peter Carey
- Language: English
- Genre: Literary
- Publisher: Random House, Australia
- Publication date: 2008
- Publication place: Australia
- Media type: Print (hardback & paperback)
- Pages: 270 pp
- ISBN: 9781741665352
- Preceded by: Theft: A Love Story
- Followed by: Parrot and Olivier in America

His Illegal Self is a 2008 novel by Australian author Peter Carey. It was shortlisted for the 2008 Queensland Premier's Literary Awards and longlisted for the 2010 International Dublin Literary Award.

== Plot summary ==
The novel is set in 1972, and the main character Che Selkirk is being brought up in New York by his grandmother. On a rare excursion to the city from his isolated home on Kenoza Lake in upstate New York, Che meets a woman who he believes is his mother. The woman, Dial, attempts to arrange a meeting between Che and his mother but this is cancelled after Che's mother is killed while attempting to plant a bomb. Dial then takes the boy away from New York, first to Seattle where they briefly meet Che's father, and then on to Queensland in Australia. Dial and Che eventually settle into a hippie commune while still attempting to evade the authorities.

== Awards ==
- 2010 longlisted for the International Dublin Literary Award

== Reviews ==
- The New York Times: "In His Illegal Self, Peter Carey draws as much magic from the muslin of contemporary speech as he has previously from the lustrous velvet of his more fanciful prose. This novel marks a departure — an altogether successful one — for the versatile author, who usually paints gorgeous whorls of story around outlandish figures from the untouchable past, real or imagined: gamblers and dreamers, circus freaks, outlaws, prodigals and passionate eccentrics."
- The Sydney Morning Herald: "The opening chapters are a tour de force, a virtuoso performance by a writer fully confident of his powers and, in a way, of his ability to get away with anything."
