= The Chemistry of Tears =

Book by Peter Carey

- First edition
- Author: Peter Carey
- Language: English
- Genre: Literary
- Publisher: Hamish Hamilton, Australia
- Publication date: 2012
- Publication place: Australia
- Media type: Print (hardback & paperback)
- Pages: 269 pp
- ISBN: 9780307592712
- Preceded by: Parrot and Olivier in America
- Followed by: Amnesia

The Chemistry of Tears is a 2012 novel by Australian author Peter Carey.

== Plot summary ==
Catherine Gehrig is a middle-aged horologist working in "the Georgian halls" of the Swinburne Museum, London SW1. For the last 13 years she has been in love with her married colleague, Matthew Tindall, and when he dies suddenly she is distraught. Her boss Eric Croft moves her to the museum annexe in Olympia and gives her a recent acquisition to assemble: a complex mechanical toy that she first thinks might be a monkey, then decides is a duck. Croft's hope is that Catherine will be led towards recovery by "the huge peace of mechanical things". She slowly becomes entranced by a story that has some peculiar parallels with her own.

This story, which is told in sections that alternate with Catherine's own, involves Henry Brandling, scion of a wealthy 19th-century railway family, husband of sourpuss Hermione and father of sickly Percy. When Percy falls ill, and all the usual Victorian therapies have failed, Henry becomes convinced that a foreign and mechanical entertainment might heal him. Henry's search for the mechanism and Catherine's restoration of it provide the novel's counterpoints.

== Reviews ==
- Andrew Motion in The Guardian: "Specifically, it is a vision of how to discover order in a random universe – something that runs the risk of seeming crackpot, or being proved unworkable, and yet preserves a kind of nobility...Carey has tackled some of these ideas before (the most obvious precursor to the construction of machines in this book is the transportation of the church in Oscar and Lucinda). But here everything has been designed, tooled, oiled and fitted together with greater economy and an equal panache. Does this mean the book ends too neatly? No. Even as it settles its main concerns, it floats new ideas (was golden boy Carl the young Karl Benz?), and emphasises latent themes (the greater love between parents and children; the endless human capacity for misunderstanding)."
- Andrew Miller in The New York Times: "In an interview a few years ago, Carey spoke of admiring the quality of “risk” in works of fiction. This, I think, is exactly right, risk being an index of a book’s and a writer’s ambition. “The Chemistry of Tears” takes risks, is quietly ambitious and is, in its last pages, both touching and thought-provoking. It’s not vintage Carey, then, but such a gifted writer is always worth attending to."

== Awards ==
- 2012 shortlisted for the Queensland Literary Awards - Fiction
- 2013 shortlisted for the Prime Minister's Literary Awards - Fiction
- 2014 longlisted for the International Dublin Literary Award

== Notes ==
The novel carried the following dedication:

"For Frances Coady"
