= Oscar and Lucinda (film) =

- Theatrical release poster
- Directed by: Gillian Armstrong
- Screenplay by: Laura Jones
- Based on: Oscar and Lucinda by Peter Carey
- Produced by: Robin Dalton; Timothy White; Mark Turnbull
- Starring: Ralph Fiennes; Cate Blanchett; Ciarán Hinds; Tom Wilkinson; Richard Roxburgh; Clive Russell; Bille Brown
- Cinematography: Geoffrey Simpson
- Edited by: Nicholas Beauman
- Music by: Thomas Newman
- Production companies: AFFC; Dalton Films; Meridian Films
- Distributed by: Fox Searchlight Pictures
- Release date: 31 December 1997
- Running time: 132 minutes
- Countries: Australia; United States
- Languages: English; French
- Box office: $4,953,510

Oscar and Lucinda is a 1997 romantic drama film directed by Gillian Armstrong and starring Cate Blanchett, Ralph Fiennes, Ciarán Hinds and Tom Wilkinson. The screenplay by Laura Jones is based on the 1988 Booker Prize-winning novel Oscar and Lucinda by Peter Carey. The film was nominated at the 70th Academy Awards for the Best Costume Design, and was also nominated for and won several AACTA and other awards.

== Plot ==
As a little girl living in Australia, Lucinda Leplastrier is given a glass bead known as a Prince Rupert's drop. This gift sparks a lifelong obsession with glass.

Lucinda's parents die when she is young, and she becomes a wealthy heiress after her guardians sell off the vast farmland that was her family's home. She buys a glass factory with her money. But she also takes to gambling after being introduced to it by her accountant.

Meanwhile, a young Oscar is being reared as a Plymouth Brother by his father. After receiving a sign from God, he decides to join the Anglican faith. While studying, Oscar is introduced to gambling and becomes highly successful. He uses his winnings to fund his studies and gives the rest to the poor. He earns a scholarship to study in New South Wales. On the boat over, he meets Lucinda and hears her confess to gambling. He says that it is not a sin. They play cards together until Oscar becomes panicked at the sight of a storm.

In New South Wales, Oscar loses his scholarship after he is unable to stop gambling. He goes to live with Lucinda, who allows him to work in her glass factory. Inspired by a model of a glass church that she shows him, he asks her to make a lifesize replica to ship to their mutual friend the Revered Dennis Hasset. Oscar bets that he can deliver it by Good Friday. Lucinda decides that they will each bet their inheritance.

Because he fears water, Oscar takes the church mostly over land and water in an expedition led by Mr. Jeffries. He witnesses Jeffries murdering and raping Indigenous Australians. Oscar kills Jeffries in self-defense after the other man attacks him.

Oscar successfully delivers the church by the deadline. Weakened upon arrival, he is left in the care of a woman named Miriam Chadwick, who rapes him. In love with Lucinda but fearing that he will have to marry Miriam, Oscar enters the glass church to pray. He falls asleep and is drowned inside when the church sinks; it had been resting on a barge in the water.

Miriam gets pregnant from her abuse of Oscar. Hasset burns the papers that confirm the wager with Lucinda, as he did not want Lucinda's money to be inherited by Miriam. She dies shortly after her son is born, whom she names Oscar. The boy is reared by Lucinda.

== Cast ==
- Ralph Fiennes as Oscar Hopkins
- Cate Blanchett as Lucinda Leplastrier
- Ciarán Hinds as the Reverend Dennis Hasset
- Tom Wilkinson as Hugh Stratton
- Richard Roxburgh as Mr. Jeffries
- Clive Russell as Theophilius
- Bille Brown as Percy Smith
- Josephine Byrnes as Miriam Chadwick
- Barnaby Kay as Wardley-Fish
- Barry Otto as Jimmy D'Abbs
- Linda Bassett as Betty Stratton
- Peter Whitford as Mr. Ahearn
- Geoffrey Rush as Narrator
- Adam Hayes as Young Oscar
- James Tingey as 13 year-old Oscar
- Polly Cheshire as Young Lucinda
- Geoff Morrell as Charley Fig
- Lucy Bell as Miss Mary Hasset

== Production ==
The film is based on the 1988 Booker Prize-winning novel Oscar and Lucinda by Peter Carey. Robin Dalton acquired the film rights before publication and lined up John Schlesinger, who had directed her film Madame Sousatzka (1988), to direct in 1990 with funding from Cineplex Odeon Films. After several years they could not come up with a script anyone was happy with and Schlesinger dropped out. Gillian Armstrong became involved and she brought in Laura Jones to write the screenplay.

Dalton, Timothy White, and Mark Turnbull produced the film. Cinematography was by Geoffrey Simpson; Nicholas Beaumont edited the film; and Luciana Arrighi was production designer.

=== Filming ===
Filming took place in Sydney (as well in the Sydney suburbs of Glebe and Randwick) and all around New South Wales. Scenes were also filmed in Hobart, Tasmania, and some others in Cornwall, south-west England.

=== Music ===
The film score was composed by American composer and conductor Thomas Newman. The soundtrack was released by CBS Masterworks Records on 9 December 1997 in Australia and the United States, performed by Newman and the Bruckner Orchestra Linz. The soundtrack was completely recorded at Paramount Scoring Stage and at The Village Recorder, in Los Angeles, California on 9–30 June 1997. The music from the track "Sydney Harbor" would eventually appear in a teaser trailer for Wall-E, another movie that Thomas Newman conducted the score for.

Oscar and Lucinda: Original Motion Picture Soundtrack

Film score by Thomas Newman
- Released: 9 December 1997
- Recorded: 1997
- Genre: Contemporary classical
- Length: 55:26
- Label: CBS Masterworks Records
- Producers: Thomas Newman, Bill Bernstein

All music is composed by Thomas Newman.

No.	Title	Length
1.	"Prince Rupert's Drop"	02:37
2.	"Throwing Lots"	00:48
3.	"Dutch Hazards"	00:50
4.	"Sydney Harbor"	01:57
5.	"Rumors"	01:26
6.	"The High Downs And The Sea"	01:52
7.	"Forgive Me"	01:02
8.	"Bruckner: On Justi"	04:39
9.	"Six Rivers To Cross"	01:14
10.	"Two Gamblers"	02:22
11.	"The Murder Of The Blacks"	01:42
12.	"Never Never"	01:16
13.	"Floorwashing"	00:40
14.	"Cards And Dogs"	01:02
15.	"One Obsessive"	01:09
16.	"The Church Of Glass"	03:50
17.	"Letters On The mantel"	01:25
18.	"Odd Bod"	01:05
19.	"Prayer Wounds"	02:11
20.	"Leviathan"	01:08
21.	"Magic Boxes (White Man's Dreaming)"	01:49
22.	"The Other Compulsive"	01:02
23.	"A Broken Thing"	00:59
24.	"The Seduction Of Mrs. Chadwick"	02:31
25.	"Wesley: Blessed Be The God And Father"	01:19
26.	"Aqua"	04:10
27.	"The Caul"	01:22
28.	"Oscar And Lucinda"	02:49
29.	"Excerpt From The Random House Audio book"	05:10
Total length:		55:26

== Release ==
=== Box office ===
Oscar and Lucinda grossed $1,768,946 at the box office in Australia, which is equivalent to $2,458,835 in 2009 dollars. The film grossed $4,953,510 between the USA, Australia, the UK, and Germany.

=== Critical reception ===
Oscar and Lucinda received generally positive reviews from critics. On the review aggregator website Rotten Tomatoes, 66% of 32 critics' reviews are positive, with an average rating of 6.6/10. Metacritic, which uses a weighted average, assigned the film a score of 66 out of 100, based on 22 critics, indicating "generally favorable" reviews.

== Awards ==
Group	Award	Recipients	Result
70th Academy Awards	Best Costume Design	Janet Patterson	Nominated
AACTA Awards	Best Achievement in Cinematography	Geoffrey Simpson	Won
AACTA Awards	Best Achievement in Costume Design	Janet Patterson	Won
AACTA Awards	Best Achievement in Production Design	Luciana Arrighi	Won
AACTA Awards	Best Achievement in Sound	Andrew Plain; Gethin Creagh; Ben Osmo	Won
AACTA Awards	Best Original Music Score	Thomas Newman	Won
AACTA Awards	Best Actress	Cate Blanchett	Nominated
AACTA Awards	Best Adapted Screenplay	Laura Jones	Nominated
Chicago Film Critics Association Awards	Most Promising Actress	Cate Blanchett	Nominated
San Diego Film Festival	Best Cinematography	Geoffrey Simpson	Won
Motion Picture Sound Editors	Best Sound Editing	Thomas Newman	Nominated
Australian Screen Sound Guild	Best Achievement in Dialogue Editing for a Feature Film	Libby Villa; Wayne Pashley	Won
Australian Screen Sound Guild	Best Achievement in Mixing for a Feature Film	Gethin Creagh; Martin Oswin	Won
Film Critics Circle of Australia Awards	Best Cinematography	Geoffrey Simpson	Won
Film Critics Circle of Australia Awards	Best Actress	Cate Blanchett	Nominated
Film Critics Circle of Australia Awards	Best Music Score	Thomas Newman	Nominated

== See also ==
- Cinema of Australia
