= Jonathan Biss =

American pianist

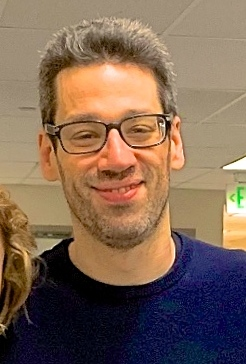
- Biss in 2019

Background information
- Born: September 18, 1980 (age 46); Bloomington, Indiana, U.S.
- Genre: Classical
- Occupations: Pianist; Author; Teacher
- Instrument: Piano
- Years active: 2000–present
- Spouse: Christopher Biss-Brown
- Website: jonathanbiss.com

Jonathan Biss (born September 18, 1980) is an American pianist, teacher, and writer based in Philadelphia. He is the co-artistic director (with Mitsuko Uchida) of the Marlboro Music Festival.

== Early life and education ==
Biss was born into a family of musicians in Bloomington, Indiana. His paternal step-grandmother was one of the first well-known female cellists, the Russian cellist Raya Garbousova, for whom Samuel Barber wrote his cello concerto. His parents, Miriam Fried and Paul Biss, are both violinists. His older brother Daniel is a politician who served as the mayor of Evanston, Illinois and was elected as congressman to the U. S. House of Representatives on November 3, 2026. Biss started learning the piano at age six, studying with Karen Taylor and Evelyne Brancart at Indiana University Bloomington's Jacobs School of Music, where both his parents taught violin. At 17, Biss entered the Curtis Institute of Music to study with Leon Fleisher. Interviewed by The New York Times in 2011 in the run-up to Biss's Carnegie Hall debut recital, Fleisher said of Biss:

His ability and interest go for things of transcendence and sublimeness. That made a great impression on me. He took a very healthy road that started with chamber music, both with his mother and then more extensively at places like Ravinia and Marlboro, and he got to be known by the elders in the profession as somebody to look out for.

== Career ==
Biss made his New York recital debut in 2000 at the 92nd Street Y. In early 2001, he performed with the New York Philharmonic under the baton of Kurt Masur. His European career was launched in 2002 when he became the first American to be selected as a BBC New Generation Artist, winning a Borletti-Buitoni Trust Award the following year. He made his recital debut at Carnegie Hall in January 2011.

He has appeared with the foremost U.S. orchestras, including the Los Angeles and New York Philharmonics; the Boston, Chicago, and San Francisco Symphonies; and the Cleveland and Philadelphia Orchestras. Biss is a frequent guest soloist in Europe, where he has appeared with the London Philharmonic Orchestra, the BBC Symphony Orchestra, and the London Symphony Orchestra, as well as the Amsterdam Concertgebouw, the Rotterdam Philharmonic, Oslo Philharmonic, Swedish Radio Symphony Orchestra, Budapest Festival Orchestra, Staatskapelle Berlin, Staatskapelle Dresden, Gewandhausorchester Leipzig and the Deutsches Symphonie-Orchester Berlin. An enthusiastic performer of chamber music, Biss has appeared with renowned artists such as Uchida, Fleisher, Richard Goode, Midori, and Kim Kashkashian.

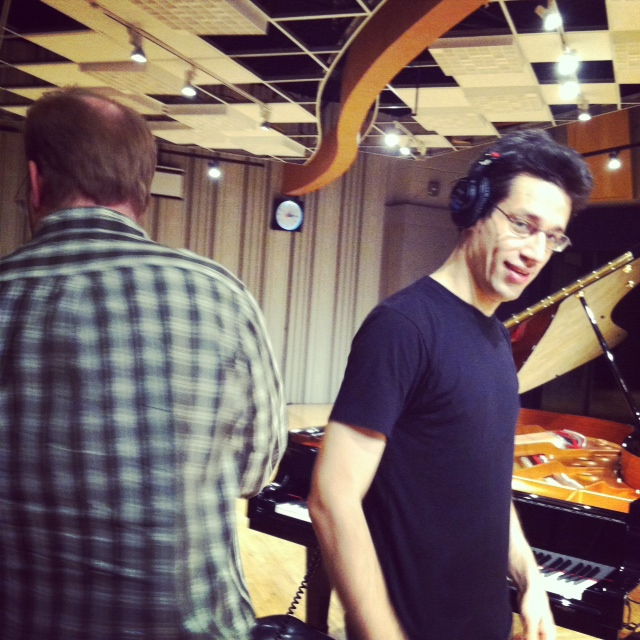
Biss at NPR studios in Washington, D.C.

In 2010, Biss was appointed to the piano faculty as Neubauer Family Chair at his alma mater, the Curtis Institute of Music. As part of his teaching career, Biss became the first classical musician to partner with Coursera. Together they created Exploring Beethoven's Piano Sonatas, a free video course on several of Beethoven's most famous sonatas. The course has reached more than 150,000 students in more than 185 countries. He will continue to add lectures until he covers all the sonatas.

Biss has concentrated on single composers. In 2011, on Beethoven's birthday, he released the eBook Beethoven's Shadow, a 19,000-word meditation on the art of performing Beethoven's piano sonatas. Biss was the first classical musician to be commissioned to write a Kindle eBook. In January 2012, the record label Onyx released the first of Biss's recordings of Beethoven's piano sonatas. It was the first of nine discs to be released over as many years. Biss dedicated his 2012–13 season to Robert Schumann, declaring himself "a fanatic for every note Schumann wrote." The project was titled "Schumann: Under the Influence" and explored Schumann's influences and his legacy. Biss performed a series of concerts internationally with pieces by Schumann's predecessors such as Mozart, Beethoven, and Purcell, and composers who have been influenced by his music such as Leoš Janáček, Alban Berg and contemporary composers György Kurtág and Timo Andres. As part of the project, Biss wrote the Kindle Single eBook A Pianist Under the Influence. The work explains Biss's lifelong, intense, multi-layered relationship with Schumann's music and was excerpted in Slate. Biss also released an album of Schumann and Dvořák with Elias String Quartet.

Biss is also an advocate for new music. He has commissioned pieces including Lunaire Variations by David Ludwig, Interlude II by Leon Kirchner, Wonderer by Lewis Spratlan, and Three Pieces for Piano and a concerto by Bernard Rands, which he premiered with the Boston Symphony Orchestra. He has also premiered a piano quintet by William Bolcom. In 2016 Biss launched Beethoven/5, for which the Saint Paul Chamber Orchestra is commissioning five composers to write new piano concertos, each inspired by one of Beethoven's five piano concertos. Biss premiered "The Blind Banister" by Timo Andres, which was named a finalist for the Pulitzer Prize for Music, "City Stanzas" by Sally Beamish, Il sogno di Stradella by Salvatore Sciarrino, "Watermark" by Caroline Shaw, and Gneixendorfer Musik - eine Winterreise by Brett Dean.

Biss has begun examining, both in concert and academically, the concept of a composer's "late style", focusing on musicians who went in surprising directions at the ends of their lives. He has put together several programs of Bach, Beethoven, Brahms, Britten, Elgar, Gesualdo, Kurtág, Mozart, Schubert, and Schumann's later works, which he performed with the Brentano Quartet and Mark Padmore in the UK, Italy, the Netherlands, and across the United States. He also gave masterclasses at Carnegie Hall in connection with the idea of late style and published Coda, a Kindle single on the topic, in 2017.

In 2018, Marlboro Music announced that Biss would assume the role of co-artistic director (with Mitsuko Uchida) of the Marlboro Music Festival in Vermont. Biss has a long connection with Marlboro, where he spent 12 summers as both a junior and senior participant.

Starting in September 2019, in the lead-up to the 250th anniversary of Beethoven's birth in December 2020, Biss performed a whole season focused around Beethoven's Piano Sonatas, with more than 50 recitals worldwide. This included the complete sonatas at the Wigmore Hall and Berkeley, multi-concert-series in Washington, Philadelphia and Seattle, and recitals in Rome, Budapest, New York and Sydney.

In 2020 Biss performed a Tiny Desk Concert for NPR, the United States' National Public Radio. The same year, he released Unquiet: My Life with Beethoven, as part of Audible's Words+Music series. Unquiet was listed as one of the platform's Top Ten Audiobooks the week it was released.

Beginning in September 2021, Biss joined the New England Conservatory of Music as a guest lecturer.

Biss writes occasional "guest essays" for The New York Times.

== Personal life ==
Biss is married to Christopher Biss-Brown, curator of the Children's Literature Research Collection at the Free Library of Philadelphia.

Biss has openly discussed his struggles with anxiety and the effects performance has on his mental health.

== Awards ==
- 1997: Wolf Trap's Shouse Debut Artist award
- 1999: Avery Fisher Career Grant
- 2002: Lincoln Center's Martin E. Segal Award
- 2002: Gilmore Young Artist Award
- 2003: Borletti-Buitoni Trust Award
- 2002–2004: member of BBC Radio 3 New Generation Artists scheme
- 2005: Leonard Bernstein Award

== Recordings ==
- Beethoven/5 Vol. 5: Beethoven ‘Piano Concerto No. 3 in C Minor' | Caroline Shaw ‘Watermark’, Jonathan Biss, 2026
- Beethoven/5 Vol. 4: Beethoven ‘Piano Concerto No. 4 in G Major' | Salvatore Sciarrino ‘Il Sogno di Stradella’, Jonathan Biss, 2025
- Beethoven/5 Vol. 3: Beethoven ‘Piano Concerto No. 2 in B-flat Major, Op. 19' | Timo Andres ‘The Blind Banister’, Jonathan Biss, 2025
- Beethoven/5 Vol. 2: Beethoven ‘Piano Concerto No. 1 in C Major' | Sally Beamish ‘City Stanzas’, Jonathan Biss, 2024
- Beethoven/5 Vol. 1: Beethoven ‘Emperor’ Concerto | Brett Dean ‘A Winter’s Journey’, Jonathan Biss, 2024
- Complete Piano Sonatas, Jonathan Biss, 2020
- Beethoven: Piano Sonatas Vol. 9 - Nos. 7, 18, 32, Jonathan Biss, 2019
- Beethoven: Piano Sonatas Vol. 8 - Nos. 8 (Pathétique), 10, 22, 31, Jonathan Biss, 2019
- Beethoven: Piano Sonatas Vol. 7 - Nos. 2, 20, 17 (The Tempest), 30, Jonathan Biss, 2018
- Beethoven: Piano Sonatas Vol. 6 – Nos. 9, 13 & 29 (Hammerklavier), Jonathan Biss, 2017
- Beethoven: Piano Sonatas Vol. 5 – Nos. 3, 25, 27 and 28, Jonathan Biss, 2016
- Beethoven: Piano Sonatas Vol. 4 – Nos. 1, 6, 19 and 23 (Appassionata), Jonathan Biss, 2015
- Beethoven: Piano Sonatas Vol. 3 – Nos. 15 (Pastoral), 16 & 21 (Waldstein), Jonathan Biss, Onyx Classics, 2014
- Beethoven: Piano Sonatas Vol. 2 – Nos. 4, 14 (Moonlight) & 24, (A Thérèse), Jonathan Biss, Onyx Classics, 2013
- Schumann: Piano Quintet; Dvorak: Piano Quintet No.2, Jonathan Biss and Elias Quartet, Onyx Classics, 2012
- Beethoven Sonatas Vol. 1 – Nos. 5, 11, 12 (Funeral March) & 26 (Les Adieux), Jonathan Biss, Onyx Classics, 2012
- Schubert: Piano Sonata in A Major D959; Piano Sonata in C Major 'Reliquie' D840; and two Kurtág Piano Miniatures, Jonathan Biss, Live From Wigmore Hall, WHLive0030, 2009
- Mozart: Piano Concertos Nos. 21 & 22, Jonathan Biss and Orpheus Chamber Orchestra, EMI Classics, 2008
- Beethoven: Piano Sonatas, Jonathan Biss, EMI Classics, 2007
- Schumann Recital – Fantasie, Kreisleriana & Arabeske, Jonathan Biss, EMI Classics, 2007
- Beethoven, Schumann: Piano Works, Jonathan Biss, EMI Classics, 2004

== Bibliography ==
- Biss, Jonathan (2020). Unquiet: My Life with Beethoven. New York: Audible Originals. ASIN B08NWDCMGP.
- Biss, Jonathan (2017). Coda. New York: Kindle Singles. ASIN B06XD4VP8S.
- Biss, Jonathan (2013). A Pianist Under the Unfluence. New York: Audible Studios. ASIN B00DEO188C.
- Biss, Jonathan (2013). Beethoven's Shadow. New York: Audible Studios. ASIN B00DCZLFG8.
