= Bliss (opera) =

Opera by Brett Dean

- Opera by Brett Dean
- Librettist: Amanda Holden
- Language: English
- Based on: Bliss by Peter Carey
- Premiere: 12 March 2010; Sydney Opera House

Bliss is an opera in three acts by Brett Dean to a libretto by Amanda Holden. The libretto is based on Peter Carey's novel Bliss, which had earlier been made into the 1985 film Bliss. The opera premiered at the Sydney Opera House on 12 March 2010 and has subsequently been performed in the United Kingdom and Germany. A performance of the work lasts for about two hours and forty minutes.

== Development ==
The development of this work suffered several setbacks over the years. Simone Young was musical director of Opera Australia when it commissioned Brett Dean and Amanda Holden to write this work. Soon after, Young left Opera Australia and took up the position of artistic director (Intendant) of the Hamburg State Opera. Her successor, Richard Hickox, also supported the work; but he died in 2008. Then, the Australian National Academy of Music, of which Dean was the Artistic Director, was threatened with the loss of its funding from the Australian federal government.

During the development of the opera, Dean wrote the orchestral piece Moments of Bliss, which premiered on 2 December 2004 at Hamer Hall, Melbourne, with the Melbourne Symphony Orchestra under Markus Stenz. Dean composed the role of Harry Joy specifically for Peter Coleman-Wright; three of this role's arias were sung by Coleman-Wright in a concert on 2 October 2008 under the title Songs of Joy with the Royal Liverpool Philharmonic conducted by Simon Rattle.

== Performance history ==
The opera premiered by Opera Australia at the Sydney Opera House on 12 March 2010. It then travelled to the Edinburgh International Festival and opened the 2010/11 season at the Hamburg State Opera.

The premiere of Bliss was accompanied with various programs on the ABC. On 13 March 2010 ABC2 showed a director's cut of the film Bliss, introduced by an interview of the film's director Ray Lawrence by David Stratton. ABC1 showed a documentary on 16 March 2010, Artscape – Making Opera Bliss and the opera's second performance on 17 March 2010 was broadcast live by ABC2 and shown on Melbourne's Federation Square and in cinemas throughout Australia.

Opera Australia's recording of the opera was nominated for the ARIA Award for Best Original Soundtrack, Cast or Show Album in 2015.

== Setting ==
The opera is set in Brisbane in the early 1980s.

== Roles ==
Role	Voice type	Premiere cast, 12 March 2010 Conductor: Elgar Howarth
Harry Joy	baritone	Peter Coleman-Wright
Betty Joy	soprano	Merlyn Quaife
Honey B	soprano	Lorina Gore
Alex	baritone	Barry Ryan
David Joy	tenor	David Corcoran
Lucy Joy	soprano	Taryn Fiebig
Johnny	tenor	Kanen Breen
Reverend Des / Police Officer 2 / "Nurse"	bass-baritone	Shane Lowrencev
Aldo / Nigel Clunes	tenor	Henry Choo
Mrs Dalton	mezzo-soprano	Milijana Nikolic
Police Officer 1 / Betty's Doctor	tenor	Stephen Smith
	onstage violinist	Erkki Veltheim
Chorus, ballet
Director		Neil Armfield
Choreography		Kate Champion
Costumes		Alice Babidge
Set design		Brian Thomson
Lighting		Nigel Levings
Sound Design		Bob Scott
