= Margot Hutcheson =

Australian artist (born 1952)

Margot Hutcheson (born 15 June 1952) is a British painter, who has lived and worked in Australia and Spain. She was a partner of writer Peter Carey.

== Early life and education ==
Margot Hutcheson was born in London on 15 June 1952.

She studied at St Martins School of Art in London from 1970 to 1971.

== Australia (1974–1990) ==
In 1974, she left for Australia, where she lived with the writer Peter Carey in an alternative community in Yandina, Queensland. She described her time there as "a simple life in the forest", where they grew their own vegetables; she painted and Carey wrote. She said, "This was despite constant raids by Joh's police, road blocks, overhead flights at treetop level by Chinooks with men leering out the doorways, plus the fear of somehow transgressing the ridiculous laws they kept passing... All of which amounted to harassment by The State."

She had her first exhibition of paintings in Australia in 1981, and held ten solo shows in all with paintings usually based on her life experiences.

By 1984, Hutcheson and Carey were resident in a bohemian area, Bellingen, around 500 km (310 mi) north of Sydney. Carey worked with performance artist Mike Mullins on a rock musical and left Hutcheson for the theatre director Alison Summers, while "Mike went off to comfort Margot".

In 1986, she moved to Toowong in Brisbane with her new partner and a baby.

Margot Hutcheson. Wasn't the Fitzgerald Enquiry Fun?.

In 1987, the Fitzgerald Inquiry into the Queensland government began, and Hutcheson attended some of the hearings:

I couldn't believe that the hypocrisy of these men was finally about to be exposed. It was personal by then. The Hearings seemed like a surreal circus from somewhere in Eastern Europe, lots of large, overweight, ruddy men in big black shoes. And nobody knew anything, 'No Hear, No See, and No Speak.' It was about cover ups, ugly sex, bribery and corruption and after the way I'd been hounded ten years before it felt vindication.

She painted a picture of the inquiry, Wasn’t the Fitzgerald Inquiry Fun?, seeing the presiding judge, Tony Fitzgerald, as "an Angel on Judgement Day".

== Spain (1990–1996) and back to London ==
In 1990, Hutcheson left Australia for Spain, where she worked until 1996, then moved to London.

== Exhibitions ==
In 2008, she was part of a group show of landscapes, Another Point of View, at the Watters gallery. Her painting A Lovely View "seems to be based on a very ordinary and boring snapshot of a group of tourist at a favourite tourist pit stop. The series of four different sized canvases, arranged at staggered heights, presents an interrupted and unexpected view different to the usual approach employed by landscape artists."

In 2009, her painting Wasn’t the Fitzgerald Inquiry Fun? was part of an exhibition of The Fitzgerald Collection at Queensland College of Art College Gallery.

== Collections ==
Hutcheson has work in the collection of the National Gallery of Victoria, the University of New South Wales, Artbank and the Museum of Contemporary Art, Brisbane.
