= Gneixendorf Music – A Winter Journey =

Piano concerto by Brett Dean

Gneixendorf Music – A Winter Journey is a 2019 piano concerto by Brett Dean to be performed on both an upright piano with the half-blow pedal activated and a grand piano. As with Dean's previous compositions Pastoral Symphony and Testament, it is inspired by Ludwig van Beethoven, specifically his stay in a farmhouse in Gneixendorf late in his life, where he revised his Symphony No. 9 and completed his String Quartet No. 16.

The work was commissioned by Jonathan Biss and the Saint Paul Chamber Orchestra as the final installment in a project for five new compositions for piano and orchestra to be coupled with Beethoven's five piano concertos, and was premiered by Biss and the Swedish Radio Symphony under David Afkham in the Berwaldhallen on February 13, 2020, next to Beethoven's Piano Concerto No. 5. Beethoven's concerto is quoted in the work, and the orchestration is the same except for the addition of a percussionist and an alto flute. The three movements' titles quote remarks by Beethoven:

1. That sounds like a breaking axle – after his reaction after first hearing about Gneixendorf.
2. Difficult decisions. Must it be? – after annotations in his String Quartet No. 16's final movement.
3. Applause my friends, the comedy is over – after his alleged last utterance in his deathbed.

The muffled upright piano is used in the first movement to depict Beethoven's aural isolation caused by his deafness.

== Reception ==
Nicholas Ringskog Ferrada-Noli from Dagens Nyheter summed up the work as a nice and creative comment on Beethoven's final piano concerto, noting that while representing a physically weakened Beethoven the "mostly energetic and intense" music conveyed "Beethoven's inner life, turbulent until the end".
