= True History of the Kelly Gang =

2000 novel by Peter Carey

- First edition
- Author: Peter Carey
- Cover artist: Kate Barry
- Language: English
- Genre: Crime, historical novel
- Publisher: UQP (Australia)
- Publication date: 2000
- Publication place: Australia
- Media type: Print (hardback and paperback)
- Pages: 401pp
- ISBN: 0-7022-3236-X
- OCLC: 52247236
- Preceded by: Jack Maggs
- Followed by: My Life as a Fake

True History of the Kelly Gang is a 2000 novel by Australian writer Peter Carey, loosely based on the life of Ned Kelly and his gang. Written as a fictional memoir as if by Kelly, the novel draws on the style of the bushranger's Jerilderie Letter and reimagines the events of his life in colonial Australia. It was first published in Australia by the University of Queensland Press.

The work is a piece of historical fiction that explores themes of identity, myth-making, and the tension between personal narrative and recorded history. The novel was widely acclaimed and won several awards, including the 2001 Booker Prize and the Commonwealth Writers Prize. It was later adapted into a 2020 film of the same name.

== Plot summary ==
Ned Kelly begins his autobiography with a description of his father, John "Red" Kelly, an Irishman transported to Van Diemen's Land and eventually settling in the colony of Victoria, Australia. After marrying Ned's mother Ellen (née Quinn), the Kellys settle in Avenel, a rural area northeast of Melbourne. Red Kelly is shown to have numerous brushes with the colonial police forces, resulting in his imprisonment and death when his son Ned was twelve years of age.

After the rest of the family resettles in northeast Victoria under the Land Grant Act, Ned's mother attempts to provide for her children by running a shebeen and taking on a series of lovers, including the notorious bushranger Harry Power. Power agrees to take on the young Ned as an apprentice, and provides Ned with knowledge of the land, hideouts, and strategies for bushranging. Kelly eventually leaves Power and returns to his family's settlement, where he is shown making dogged attempts to live an honest lifestyle.

Kelly is arrested and sentenced to three years in prison for the reception of a stolen horse (although Kelly claims that a friend, "Wild" Wright, knowingly sold him the stolen horse without Kelly's knowledge – Kelly later exacts revenge on Wright in a bare-knuckle boxing match). After two years of working as a sawmill hand, he is drawn back to bushranging when a herd of his horses is appropriated by a rival squatter. His descent back into crime is precipitated by a visit from a local police officer, Constable Alex Fitzpatrick. The policeman woos Ned's younger sister, Kate, prompting Ned to reveal that Fitzpatrick has multiple mistresses in other towns and has no intention of marrying Kate. After his mother Ellen threatens the constable with violence, Fitzpatrick pulls his revolver on the family and Ned shoots him in the hand in self-defense. Although he dresses the wound and Fitzpatrick leaves while promising that no action will be taken, warrants for the arrest of Ned and his younger brother Dan are issued the next day.

Ned Kelly and his brother Dan hide out in the hills of northeast Victoria, eventually being joined by their friends Steve Hart and Joe Byrne (later becoming known as the Kelly Gang). Kelly's mother is eventually arrested along with her baby daughter and imprisoned in Melbourne as an enticement for Kelly to give himself up. A detachment of four policemen is eventually sent to kill the quartet after efforts to arrest them prove unsuccessful; the Kelly Gang ambushes them at Stringybark Creek, where Ned kills three of the policemen. This adds to the growing folklore surrounding the Kelly Gang, which they fuel by robbing banks and giving parts of the money to the lower-class settlers in Victoria who help to shelter the gang.

During the gang's raids, Ned Kelly meets a young Irish girl named Mary Hearn, who already has a young son by Kelly's stepfather, George King. Kelly falls in love with Mary and makes plans to escape the colony with her after she becomes pregnant with his child. Crucially, it is Mary who motivates Kelly to begin writing the story of his life as a legacy for his future child, who she fears will never know its father. Following two successful bank robberies, Mary uses the money to emigrate to San Francisco with her son and Kelly's unborn daughter; Kelly remains behind, however, unwilling to leave Australia until his mother is released from jail.

The gang is eventually cornered by a large squad of dozens of policemen (versus just four in the Kelly Gang) in the town of Glenrowan where the gang has taken numerous hostages and constructed several suits of plate-steel armour for protection. One of the hostages is the crippled local schoolmaster, Thomas Curnow, who encourages Kelly to relate the story of his entire life after seeing samples of his writing. Curnow betrays the gang by warning the incoming police train that the gang has sabotaged the tracks, feeling that history will view him as a "hero". The policemen surround the town and engage in a furious shootout with the armour-clad gang, seriously wounding Ned Kelly and killing the other three members of the gang. Kelly's narrative stops abruptly just before the shootout itself; a secondary narrator, identified as "S.C", relates the tale of the gunfight and Kelly's death by hanging. Since Curnow is shown to have escaped Glenrowan with Kelly's manuscripts, it is assumed that this narrator is a relative of Curnow's. Kelly dies a hero to the people of northeastern Victoria, with the legend of his life left to grow over time.

== Technique ==
The novel is divided into thirteen sections (each ostensibly written by Kelly), with a short description at the beginning of each section describing the physical condition of the original manuscripts. The novel also includes a preface and a frame narrative at the end which describe the events of Kelly's final shootout at Glenrowan and his eventual death sentence. Carey departs from what is known about Kelly's life by providing him with a lover and a daughter, for whom he has been recording his life history whilst on the run from the police.

The novel is written in a distinctive vernacular style, with little in the way of punctuation or grammar; the influence of Kelly's Irish heritage is also apparent in his language. The style is similar to Kelly's most famous surviving piece of writing, The Jerilderie Letter. Excepting the frame narratives of "S.C", the novel does not contain any commas. Although there is much profanity in the novel, it has been censored (replacing vulgarities with terms such as "effing" or "adjectival") for the benefit of Kelly's fictional daughter, presumably by Kelly himself.

== Reception ==
English writer Robert McCrum named True History of the Kelly Gang one of the 100 greatest novels written in English. In 2019, the novel was ranked 53rd on The Guardian's list of the 100 best books of the 21st century.

In an effort to attract American readers to the story, the book's American publisher, Alfred Knopf, heralded the book as a "Great American Novel", even though the novel takes place entirely within Australia. The claim that this book is an "American novel" appears to be based on the fact that author Peter Carey, an Australian, has lived in New York City for many years.

== Fiction vs known facts ==
This novel uses many aspects of the history of the Kelly Gang, but much of it is invented, and other facts are distorted.

The 'parcels' are entirely an invention of the author, as is the "Sons of Sieve", and the suggestion that Ellen Kelly and Harry Power were lovers. The character Mary Hearne, and her children, are entirely fictional; Ned Kelly is not known to have fathered any children in his lifetime, nor was he known to be romantically involved with any woman during his outlawry.

== Awards and nominations ==
- Booksellers Choice Award, 2000: shortlisted
- Centre for Australian Cultural Studies Award, 2000: winner
- Colin Roderick Award, Best Australian Book, 2000: winner
- The Age Book of the Year Award, Book of the Year, 2001: winner
- The Age Book of the Year Award, Fiction Prize, 2001: winner
- Booker Prize (UK), 2001: winner
- Commonwealth Writers Prize, South East Asia Region, Best Book for the Region Award, 2001: winner
- Commonwealth Writers Prize, Overall Best Book Award, 2001: winner
- The Courier-Mail Book of the Year Award, 2001: joint winner
- Queensland Premier's Literary Awards, Best Fiction Book, 2001: winner
- Victorian Premier's Literary Awards, The Vance Palmer Prize for Fiction, 2001: winner^{[a]}
- Miles Franklin Award, 2001: shortlisted
- Festival Awards for Literature (SA), The Premier's Award, 2002: winner
- Festival Awards for Literature (SA), Dymocks Booksellers National Fiction Award, 2002: inaugural winner
- International Dublin Literary Award, 2002: shortlisted
- One Book One Brisbane, 2002: winner
- Prix du Meilleur Livre Étranger (France), 2003: winner

=== Notes ===
- ^aIn a 2001 press release the administrators of the Victorian Premier's Literary Awards, the State Library of Victoria, erroneously named Frank Moorhouse's Dark Palace as the winner of that year's award, when in fact the decision had gone to True History of the Kelly Gang.

== Film adaptation ==
A film adaptation of Carey's novel was released in Australian cinemas in January 2020. Directed by Justin Kurzel, the film's cast includes George MacKay as Ned Kelly and Russell Crowe as Harry Power.
