= Illywhacker =

1985 novel by Peter Carey

- First edition (Australia)
- Author: Peter Carey
- Cover artist: Christopher McVinish
- Language: English
- Publisher: UQP (Australia); Faber & Faber (UK); Harper & Row (US)
- Publication date: 1985
- Publication place: Australia
- Media type: Print (hardback and paperback)
- Pages: 600 pp
- ISBN: 0-7022-2000-0
- OCLC: 217478264
- Preceded by: Bliss
- Followed by: Oscar and Lucinda

Illywhacker is a novel by Australian writer Peter Carey. It was published in 1985 to commercial and critical success, winning a number of awards and being short-listed for the Booker Prize.

Considered metafiction or magical realism, the novel is narrated by liar, trickster, and confidence man Herbert Badgery, the "illywhacker" of the title, and tells the story of his picaresque life in Australia between 1919 and the 1980s.

== Plot summary ==
The novel is related in broad chronological order by the main protagonist, Herbert Badgery, but with frequent digressions that relate the circumstances and life history of Badgery himself, and of many of the characters he meets.

The story begins in 1919 when the thirty-three-year-old Herbert lands his aeroplane in a field close to the wealthy former bullock-herder Jack McGrath. Herbert befriends Jack and persuades him to invest in the construction of an aeroplane factory. Herbert also becomes the lover of Jack's teenage daughter Phoebe, who had previously been involved in a lesbian relationship with a teacher, Annette Davidson. Jack commits suicide following a violent argument between Herbert and some other potential investors. Herbert marries Phoebe and they bear two children, Charles and Sonia. After learning to fly Herbert's aeroplane, Phoebe steals it, abandoning her husband and children to live with Annette. Herbert briefly becomes the lover of Jack's widow, Molly, but goes out on the road to scrape a living, often as a confidence trickster, accompanied by his two children. He meets Leah Goldstein, a former medical student turned dancer who is married to the Communist agitator Izzie Kaletsky. She and Herbert become lovers and develop a variety act, but Leah returns to care for Izzie after he has both legs amputated following an accident.

Sonia dies, and Herbert is subsequently jailed for an assault on a Chinese man who had been his childhood mentor, Goon Tse Ying, whose finger is torn off. In prison, Herbert is presented with the preserved finger in a jar, and finds that looking into the jar presents the viewer with curious visions. Herbert, who for much of his life had been illiterate, begins studying, and eventually obtains a degree in Australian history.

Charles becomes a dealer in animals, and meets Emma Underhill when required to rescue her from the clutches of a frightened goanna. Charles falls in love with and weds Emma, despite warnings from her father about her fragile mental state. Charles builds a successful business selling animals and moves into larger and larger premises. Upon the outbreak of World War Two, he considers enlisting, but is rejected because of his hearing. Traumatised by his decision, Emma retreats into the goanna's cage and continues living in an adapted cage for the rest of her life. Leah returns to help Charles, but also begins living in a cage, as part of Charles' extended household.

After his release from prison, Herbert goes to live with Charles at the pet emporium. He attempts to rebuild part of Charles' shop, but the attempt ends in disaster. Herbert befriends Charles' youngest son, Hissao, who dreams of becoming an architect. Herbert suffers a stroke, and Charles is obliged to consider how his shop can continue to maintain the support of his American backers, who wish to export animals illegally against Charles' wishes. Emma comes into possession of the jar of Herbert's that contains Ying's finger and claims that she sees a reptile in the bottle that she also claims is Hissao's half-brother. Distraught by the claim, Charles shoots Emma's goanna, and turns the gun on himself.

Hissao claims he will not give up architecture in order to preserve the family business by becoming an animal smuggler, but does so, and becomes wealthy and much-travelled. He accidentally kills a rare bird he is smuggling, whereupon he sells much of his share in the business to Japanese investors and commences rebuilding the emporium to his own design, according to which it becomes a bizarre and controversial museum of the Australian nation.

== Reception ==
Illywhacker was well received by critics and won a number of awards.

Reviewing the book in The New York Times, Howard Jacobson called it "a big, garrulous, funny novel, touching, farcical and passionately bad-tempered... Not unlike spending a week in the company of the best kind of Australian."

== Awards and nominations ==
- The Age Book of the Year Award, Imaginative Writing Prize, 1985: winner
- The Age Book of the Year Award, Book of the Year, 1985: winner
- Booker Prize, 1985: shortlisted
- Ditmar Award for Best Australian Science Fiction Novel, 1986: winner
- FAW Barbara Ramsden Award for the Book of the Year, 1985: joint winner
- National Book Council Award for Australian Literature, 1985: winner
- Victorian Premier's Literary Award, Vance Palmer Prize for Fiction, 1986: winner
- World Fantasy Award Best Novel, 1986: shortlisted
