= Helen Jones (actress) =

Australian actress

- Occupation: Actor

Helen Jones is an Australian actress. She appeared in the films Bliss and Waiting. For the latter she was nominated for the 1991 AFI Award for Best Actress in a Supporting Role.
