= The Tax Inspector =

Novel by Peter Carey

- First edition cover
- Author: Peter Carey
- Language: English
- Publisher: University of Queensland Press
- Publication date: 1991
- Publication place: Australia
- Media type: Print (hardback & paperback)
- Preceded by: Oscar and Lucinda
- Followed by: The Unusual Life of Tristan Smith

The Tax Inspector is a 1991 novel by Peter Carey, published in Australia by the University of Queensland Press, in the UK by Faber & Faber and, at the start of 1992, by A. A. Knopf in the US. Its barbed portrayal of a dysfunctional New South Wales family brought the author strong national criticism.

== Plot ==
Catchprice Motors is a terminally run-down used car business founded by 'Cacka' Catchprice and his wife Frieda in the 1940s but now resembling nothing more than a "badly tended family grave". The business is in Franklin, New South Wales, which used to be a country town twenty miles from Sydney. Since then Sydney has swollen in size and Franklin finds itself only two miles beyond the outermost suburbs; it too has become built up and is largely inhabited by indigent immigrants. Responsibility for running the business rests mainly with Frieda's daughter Cathy, an aspiring Country and Western singer, and her manager husband, Howie McPherson, a "Rockabilly throwback" with pencil-line moustache and ducktail haircut.

All of the Catchprice children were abused when young and are dysfunctional in their various ways. Their mother Frieda, who had turned a blind eye to Cacka's behaviour while he was alive, would rather have run a flower farm on their plot. Cathy was brought up on opera but now writes her own country material and longs to be on the road with her band. Of her brothers, Mort works as a morose mechanic, in denial about his upbringing. The younger brother, Jack, has left for Sydney and a successful career as a property developer. Mort has two sons, as abused by him as he by his father. The elder has escaped to join a Hare Krishna ashram in Sydney; though he has changed his name from Johnny to Vishnabarnu, he remains a Catchprice at the beck and call of his family. The mentally unstable younger son, Benny, was the only one in the family to be content until he is sacked from the business for inefficiency. His condition then worsens into delusion.

Into this scenario enters Maria Takis, the Tax Inspector, who takes vengeful pleasure in investigating the affairs of the rich and privileged. Unmarried and eight months pregnant, she has now been sidelined into auditing the finances of Catchprice Motors. By doing so she acts as the catalyst that destabilises the lives of all the family members and forces them to acknowledge what the past has made of them. Jack falls in love with her and is ready to renounce his affluent lifestyle. Cathy at last makes the decision to quit the business and follow her dream. Frieda believes the remedy for her increasingly senile confusion is to dynamite the garage.

Benny too believes he is in love with Maria and kidnaps her. As the buildings blow up about the waterlogged cellar in which he has his den, Maria gives birth and bludgeons Benny to death in order to save her child.

== Responses ==
The Tax Inspector was Peter Carey's first novel following Oscar and Lucinda, which had won the Booker Prize in 1988. Begun as a reaction to hearing the then premier of Queensland declare his intention to cut the taxes of the affluent classes, his "nihilistic Gothic saga" went through twelve drafts and raised controversy for its references to child abuse and its criticism of high level corruption. As a result, Carey was described as a "national conscience" by one critic and accused of being anti-Australian by others.

Assessments in general praised the quality of the writing while criticising the story's shortcomings. Francine Prose, for example, reviewing the book for The New York Times, commented that "to summarize the novel's characters or its twisted plot is to risk making the book sound simply cartoonish, quirky and grotesque". However, the author's style is admirable. "Peter Carey writes beautiful sentences, worked on but not labored; his descriptive passages sweep us along and leave us in some felicitous, unanticipated place."

Returning to the novel a decade later, David Carroll found himself broadly in agreement as to the persuasiveness of Carey's writing. He "concentrates on the characters and their stories, conveying his wonderful knack for detail and the twisted yet compelling logic that underpins his societies", but for all that "the novel didn't really work". "Why is it," he quotes Richard Glover complaining in his review of The Tax Inspector on its first appearance, and drawing a parallel with the 1990s fashion for demented murderers, "Why is it…that every time I pick up a literary novel these days, I seem to end up in some cellar with a demented sexual pervert?" (The Sydney Morning Herald, 27/7/1991).
