= Wrong About Japan =

2005 book by Peter Carey

- First edition (Australia)
- Author: Peter Carey
- Language: English
- Genre: Travel
- Publisher: Random House (Australia); Knopf (US); Faber & Faber (UK)
- Publication date: 2005 (Australia); 2005 (UK & US)
- Publication place: Australia
- Media type: Print (hardback)
- ISBN: 1-74051-325-8

Wrong about Japan is a 2005 book by Peter Carey. It is subtitled A Father's Journey with his Son.

Superficially a piece of travel writing, Wrong About Japan is a partially fictionalized account of Carey's cultural investigation of Japan alongside his son, Charley.

== Overview ==
Carey relates his experience traveling to Japan with his twelve-year-old son Charley, a fan of manga and anime. During this trip, Carey meets, together with his son, and interviews Yoshiyuki Tomino and Hayao Miyazaki. The main theme of the book is the contrast between the son, mostly interested in manga, anime, and technology, and the father, interested in Japanese history and traditional culture. Another important aspect of the book is the difficulty Carey encounters in his attempts as a foreigner in understanding Japanese culture.

== Reception ==
Peter Conrad of The Observer called Wrong About Japan "an odd, unnecessary little book" and a "disengaged feat of thumb-twiddling." Marcel Theroux of The New York Times wrote that "anyone who wants to find out about Japan or manga will be better served elsewhere." Ian Sansom of The Guardian expressed suspicion that Takashi, Carey's son's friend "who pops up unexpectedly and at all the right moments and appears too good to be true," might not be a real person. Carey later confirmed in a television interview that Takashi was a fictional character. In a 2017 retrospective review, Stephen Mansfield of The Japan Times noted that Wrong About Japan was "not universally appreciated when it was first published in 2005, but time has proven it to be a small, highly original contribution to books on this country."
