= Brett Dean =

Australian composer, conductor and violist (born 1961)

- Born: 23 October 1961 (age 64); Brisbane, Queensland, Australia
- Occupations: Composer, violist, conductor
- Relatives: Paul Dean (brother)

Brett Dean (born 23 October 1961) is an Australian composer, violist and conductor.

== Early life ==
Brett Dean was born, raised, and educated in Brisbane. He attended Brisbane State High School.

He started learning violin at age 8, and later studied viola with Elizabeth Morgan and John Curro at the Queensland Conservatorium, where he graduated in 1982 with the Conservatorium Medal for the highest-achieving student of the year. In 1981 he was a prizewinner in the ABC Symphony Australia Young Performers Awards.

== Career ==
From 1985 to 1999, Dean was a violist in the Berlin Philharmonic Orchestra. In 2000, he decided to pursue a freelance career and returned to Australia, where his many appointments have included curating classical music programs with the Sydney Festival (2005) and the Melbourne Festival (2009). As a composer and musician, he is a regularly invited guest to concert stages around the world. He was the Creative Chair for the Tonhalle-Orchester Zürich's 2017/2018 season.

Dean was artistic director of the Australian National Academy of Music in Melbourne until June 2010, when his brother, Paul, took up the post.

The Melbourne Symphony Orchestra celebrated Dean's 50th birthday, and his contribution to music as composer, performer and teacher, in its 2011 Metropolis Festival.

He is married to Australian visual artist Heather Betts, and his daughter is the Australian mezzo-soprano Lotte Betts-Dean.

== Works ==
=== General ===
Dean began composing in 1988, initially focusing on experimental film and radio projects as well as improvisational performance. Since then, he has created numerous compositions, mainly orchestral or chamber music as well as concertos for several solo instruments. His most successful work is Carlo for strings, sample and tape, inspired by the music of Carlo Gesualdo. On 7 September 2008 his work Polysomnography for wind quintet and piano received its world premiere at the Lucerne Festival; on 2 October 2008 Simon Rattle conducted the first performance of the orchestral song cycle Songs of Joy in Philadelphia. His first opera, Bliss, based on the novel by Peter Carey, premiered at Opera Australia in 2010.

Dean's compositional style is known for creating dynamic soundscapes and treating single instrumental parts with complex rhythms. He shapes musical extremes, from harsh explosions to inaudibility. Modern playing techniques are as characteristic for his style as an elaborate percussion scoring, often enriched with objects from everyday life. Much of Dean's work draws from literary, political or visual stimuli, transporting a non-musical message. Environmental problems are the subject of Water Music and Pastoral Symphony, while Vexations and Devotions deal with the absurdities of a modern society obsessed with information.

In April 2013, The Last Days of Socrates was premiered by the Berlin Philharmonic. The work for bass-baritone, choir, and orchestra was a co-commission of the Rundfunkchor Berlin, the Los Angeles Philharmonic and the Melbourne Symphony Orchestra.

In August 2014, Electric Prelude was premiered during the BBC Proms 2014 and was conducted by Sakari Oramo.

On 10 May 2026, his opera Of One Blood premiered at the Bavarian State Opera in Munich. The work explores the complex relationship between Elizabeth I and Mary Stuart.

=== List of compositions ===
==== Stage ====
- One of a Kind – Ballet in three acts for solo cello and tape (1998)
- Bliss – Opera (2010)
- Hamlet – Opera in two acts (2013–16)
- Of One Blood – Opera (2026)

==== Orchestra ====
- Carlo – Music for strings, sampler and tape (1997)
- Beggars and Angels Music for orchestra (1999)
- Amphitheatre – Scene for orchestra (2000)
- Etüdenfest for string orchestra with off-stage piano (2000)
- Game over for instrumental soloists, string orchestra and electronics (2000)
- Pastoral Symphony for chamber orchestra (2000)
- Dispersal for orchestra (2001)
- Shadow Music for small orchestra (2002)
- Between Moments – Music for orchestra, in memory of Cameron Retchford (2003)
- Ceremonial for orchestra (2003)
- Moments of Bliss for orchestra (2004)
- Parteitag – Music for orchestral groups and video (2004/05)
- Short Stories – Five interludes for string orchestra (2005)
- Komarov's Fall for orchestra (2005/06)
- Testament – Music for orchestra, after version for 12 violas (2008)
- Electric Prelude (2014)

==== Concertos ====
- Ariel's Music for clarinet and orchestra (1995)
- Viola Concerto (2004)
- Water Music for saxophone quartet and chamber orchestra (2004)
- The Lost Art of Letter Writing for violin and orchestra (2006) – winner of the 2009 Grawemeyer Award for Music Composition. Written for and first performed by Frank Peter Zimmermann in 2007. Its four movements are prefaced by four 19th-century letters, by Johannes Brahms (a love letter to Clara Schumann), Vincent van Gogh, Hugo Wolf, and Ned Kelly, an Australian bushranger. Music by Brahms and Wolf is quoted in the first and third movements, respectively. The playing time is about 34 minutes.
- The Siduri Dances for solo flute and string orchestra (2007)
- Dramatis personae for trumpet and orchestra (2013)
- Cello Concerto (2018)
- The Players (2018/19) for accordion and orchestra
- Gneixendorf Music – A Winter Journey for piano and orchestra (2020)

==== Chamber music ====
- Fledermaus-Overture by Johann Strauss II, arranged for octet (1988)
- Wendezeit (Homage to F.C.) for 5 violas (1988)
- some birthday... for 2 violas and cello (1992)
- Night Window for clarinet, viola, and piano (1993)
- Till Eulenspiegel's Merry Pranks by Richard Strauss, arranged for octet (1995)
- Twelve Angry Men for 12 cellos (1996; inspired by the 1957 film 12 Angry Men)
- Voices of Angels for strings and piano (1996)
- Intimate Decisions for solo viola (1996)
- Night's Journey for 4 trombones (1997)
- One of a Kind for viola and tape (1998, 2012)
- Three Pieces for Eight Horns (1998)
- hundreds and thousands for tape (1999)
- Huntington Eulogy for cello and piano (2001)
- Testament for 12 violas (2002)
- String Quartet No. 1 Eclipse (2003)
- Three Caprichos after Goya for solo guitar (2003)
- Equality for piano (with speaking part) (2004)
- Demons for solo flute (2004)
- Prayer for piano (with speaking part) (2005)
- Recollections for ensemble (2006)
- Polysomnography for piano and wind quartet (2007)
- Epitaph for viola quintet (2010)
- Skizzen für Siegbert (Sketches for Siegbert) for solo viola (2011)
- Electric Preludes for electric violin and ensemble (2012)
- String Quartet No. 2 ("And once I played Ophelia") for string quartet and soprano (2013), won Paul Lowin Song Cycle Prize
- Rooms of Elsinore for viola and piano (2016)
- Mottos, mantras and memes for string quartet (2018)
- String Quartet No. 3 Hidden Agendas (2019)
- Seven Signals for clarinet, violin, cello, and piano (2019)
- Imaginary Ballet for piano quartet (2021)
- String Quartet No. 4 A Little Book of Prayers (2025)

==== Choral ====
- Bell and Anti-Bell (from Parables, Lullabies and Secrets) for children's choir and small orchestra (2001)
- Katz und Spatz for eight-part mixed chorus (2002)
- Tracks and Traces: Four Songs for children's choir to texts by indigenous Australians (2002)
- Vexations and Devotions for choirs and large orchestra (2005)
- Now Comes the Dawn for mixed chorus (2007)
- Carlo Version for strings and live voices (2011)
- Concedas, Domine (a grace) for SATB chorus (2011)
- The Annunciation for chorus and ensemble (2012)
- The last days of Socrates for bass-baritone, SATB chorus, and orchestra (2013)
- In This Brief Moment for soprano, countertenor, two SATB choirs, and orchestra (2020–21)

==== Vocal ====
- Winter Songs for tenor and wind quintet (2000)
- Buy Now, Pay Later! by Tim Freedman, arr. for voice and ensemble (2002)
- Sparge la morte for solo cello, vocal consort and tape (2006)
- Poems and Prayers for mezzo-soprano and piano (2006)
- Wolf-Lieder for soprano and ensemble (2006)
- Songs of Joy (from Bliss) for baritone and orchestra (2008)
- Madame ma bonne sœur for mezzo-soprano and string quartet (2020–21)
- Ich lausche und ich höre for soprano and octet, text by Karoline von Günderrode (2023)

== Awards and honours ==
=== Miscellaneous ===
Dean's clarinet concerto Ariel's Music won an award from the International Music Council's International Rostrum of Composers in 1999. Winter Songs for tenor and wind quintet received the Paul Lowin Song Cycle Prize in 2001; Moments of Bliss for orchestra was named Best Composition at the Australian Classical Music Awards in 2005.

Dean has been composer-in-residence several times, including at the 2010 Cheltenham Festival, the 2011 Trondheim Chamber Music Festival, for the Taiwanese National Symphony Orchestra's 2016/17 season, the London Philharmonic Orchestra from 2020 until 2023, Wigmore Hall in 2023/24, and with the Berlin Philharmonic for the 2026/27 season.

Dean was awarded an honorary doctorate from Griffith University in Brisbane on 21 June 2007.

On 1 December 2008, he was awarded the 2009 University of Louisville Grawemeyer Award for Music Composition for his violin concerto, The Lost Art of Letter Writing.

In 2013, Dean was awarded the Melbourne Prize for Music.

Dean received two Ivor Novello Award nominations at the Ivors Classical Awards 2023. Cello Concerto and In This Brief Moment were both nominated for Best Orchestral Composition. The Cello Concerto won the award.

Dean received another nomination at the Ivors Classical Awards 2024. In Spe Contra Spem, for two sopranos and orchestra, was nominated for Best Orchestral Composition.

=== APRA Awards (Australia) ===
The APRA Awards are presented annually since 1982 by the Australasian Performing Right Association (APRA).

Year	Nominee / work	Award	Result
2005	Moments of Bliss (Brett Dean)	Best Composition by an Australian Composer	Won
2005	Eclipse (Brett Dean) – Artemis Quartet	Best Performance of an Australian Composition	Nominated
2005	Moments of Bliss (Brett Dean) – Melbourne Symphony Orchestra	Best Performance of an Australian Composition	Nominated
2007	Viola Concerto (Brett Dean)	Best Composition by an Australian Composer	Nominated
2008	The Lost Art of Letter Writing (Brett Dean) – Frank Peter Zimmermann (violinist), Munich Philharmonic, Jonathan Nott (conductor)	Best Performance of an Australian Composition	Nominated
2012	Sextet (Brett Dean) – Australia Ensemble	Work of the Year – Instrumental	Won
2013	Fire Music (Brett Dean) – Adelaide Symphony Orchestra, Brett Dean (conductor)	Work of the Year – Orchestral	Won
2014	The Last Days of Socrates (Brett Dean, Graeme Ellis [text]) – Peter Coleman-Wright (soloist), Melbourne Symphony Orchestra and Chorus, Simone Young (conductor)	Work of the Year – Orchestral	Nominated
2014	The Last Days of Socrates (Brett Dean, Graeme Ellis [text]) – Peter Coleman-Wright (soloist), Melbourne Symphony Orchestra and Chorus, Simone Young (conductor)	Performance of the Year	Won
2015	Dramatis Personae – Music for Trumpet and Orchestra (Brett Dean) – Håkan Hardenberger (soloist), Brett Dean (conductor), Sydney Symphony Orchestra	Orchestral Work of the Year	Won

=== ARIA Music Awards ===
The ARIA Music Awards is an annual awards ceremony that recognises excellence, innovation, and achievement across all genres of Australian music. They commenced in 1987.

Year	Nominee / work	Award	Result	Ref.
2008	Brett Dean (with Sydney Symphony Orchestra)	Best Classical Album	Nominated	

=== Bernard Heinze Memorial Award ===
The Sir Bernard Heinze Memorial Award is given to a person who has made an outstanding contribution to music in Australia.

Year	Nominee / work	Award	Result	Ref.
2009	Brett Dean	Sir Bernard Heinze Memorial Award	awarded	

=== Don Banks Music Award ===
The Don Banks Music Award was established in 1984 to publicly honour a senior artist of high distinction who has made an outstanding and sustained contribution to music in Australia. It was founded by the Australia Council in honour of Don Banks, Australian composer, performer and the first chair of its music board.

Year	Nominee / work	Award	Result
2016	Brett Dean	Don Banks Music Award	awarded

=== Helpmann Awards ===
The Helpmann Awards is an awards show, celebrating live entertainment and performing arts in Australia, presented by industry group Live Performance Australia since 2001.

Year	Nominee / work	Award	Result	Ref.
2010	Brett Dean and Amanda Holden – Bliss	Best New Australian Work	Nominated	
2010	Brett Dean – Bliss	Best Original Score	Nominated	
