= 30 Days in Sydney =

2001 book by Peter Carey

- First edition (publ. Bloomsbury)
- Author: Peter Carey
- Language: English
- Set in: Sydney, Australia
- Publisher: Bloomsbury Publishing
- Publication date: July 15, 2010
- Media type: Hardcover
- Pages: 256
- ISBN: 9780747555001
- Website: Publisher's site

30 Days in Sydney is a book written by Australian novelist Peter Carey. It was published in 2001 and is subtitled A Wildly Distorted Account.

Superficially a piece of travel writing, 30 Days in Sydney is perhaps more of a view into the psyche of Carey, an Australian returning home after a seventeen-year absence, his motley crew of friends, and Sydneysiders in general.

== Plot overview ==
The book takes the form of an impressionistic, possibly somewhat fictionalised, account of Carey's brief stay, and of his attempts to gather his required material. During his time in Sydney, around the 2000 Olympic Games, he badgered his friends with a battered tape recorder, to get them to give their own stories and impressions of the city. Carey wishes to structure the book around the elements of earth, wind, fire and water, and his friends, sometimes reluctantly, oblige. One tells of his attempts to rescue his home from a bushfire, and another of a near death experience during the disastrous 1998 Sydney to Hobart Yacht Race.

Meanwhile, Carey's own narrative digresses into history and anecdote, touching on Sydney's uneasy race relations and a horrific recurring dream involving the Harbour Bridge, and culminating in a dramatic late night incident in a rooftop squat.

Carey finishes the book by stating "A metropolis is, by definition, inexhaustible, and by the time I departed, thirty days later, Sydney was as unknowable to me as it had been on that clear April morning when I arrived."
