= The Visitor (2002 film) =

2002 Australian film

The Visitor is a 2002 Australian film directed by Dan Castle and produced by Jane Fullerton-Smith starring Barry Otto. This is a short film, lasting 30 minutes.

== Plot ==
"Michael, in his beach-home in Australia, is avoiding phone calls regarding his lifelong dear friend and former lover of two-years, Chris who is dying back in Boston, United States. While trying to write, he is disturbed by the noisy surfers next door as they get ready for a weekend away of surf. C.K., one of the surfers, remains behind to surf the local beach. At the beach cafe for lunch with his old friend Angus, Michael again avoids discussing Chris back in the United States. Angus catches Michael watching C.K. on the beach and teases him but Michael denies any interest in the surfer. Left on his own, Michael watches C.K. catch a series of waves. After a big wave and a wipe out, C.K. disappears in the surf. Michael loses sight of C.K. until he sees him on the beach taking off his wetsuit before he heads back home. Michael remains on the beach then makes his way home. Once inside his house, Michael sees C.K. walking towards him on his way to the living room where he makes himself at home. Michael does not know why the surfer is in his house but before the night is over he will discover more about himself than he may have been ready for."

== Awards ==
- Official Selection: Telluride Film Festival
- Nominated for Best Short Film – Australian Film Institute Awards
- Winner: Best Fiction Short – St Kilda Short Film Festival
- Winner: Best Screenplay – St Kilda Short Film Festival
- Winner: Best Short – Australian's in Film – Mardi Gras Film Festival
- Winner: Best Short – Seattle Gay and Lesbian Film Festival
- Winner: Best Short – Honolulu Gay and Lesbian Film Festival
- Winner: Best Short – North Carolina Gay & Lesbian Film Festival
