= The Best of the Booker =

Literary prize awarded in 2008

The Best of the Booker was a special prize awarded in commemoration of the Booker Prize's 40th anniversary in 2008. Eligible books included the 41^{[A]} winners of the Booker Prize since its inception in 1968. The six shortlisted titles were announced on 12 May 2008 and were chosen by novelist Victoria Glendinning, broadcaster Mariella Frostrup and Professor of English at University College London John Mullan. Among the nominees were the only two authors at that time to have won the Booker twice, Peter Carey and J. M. Coetzee, nominated for their novels Oscar & Lucinda (1988) and Disgrace (1999) respectively.

The winner, as chosen by a public vote, was Salman Rushdie's Midnight's Children, and was announced on July 10 at the London Literature Festival. Midnight's Children not only won the 1981 Booker, but also the special 1993 Booker of Bookers prize, which commemorated the award's 25th anniversary.

The shortlisted titles were:

- (1973) J. G. Farrell, The Siege of Krishnapur
- (1974) Nadine Gordimer, The Conservationist
- (1981) Salman Rushdie, Midnight's Children
- (1988) Peter Carey, Oscar & Lucinda
- (1995) Pat Barker, The Ghost Road
- (1999) J. M. Coetzee, Disgrace

== Notes ==
- ^{A} The Booker prize was shared between two authors in 1974 and 1992, thus generating 41 winners in 39 years.
