= John Mullan (academic) =

Professor of English at University College London

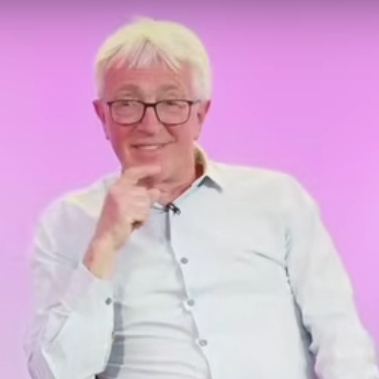
HistFest 250 Years of Jane Austen in 2025, included John Mullan

John Mullan is a professor of English at University College London (UCL). He is a specialist in eighteenth-century literature, currently writing the 1709–1784 volume of the Oxford English Literary History.

He has written a weekly column on contemporary fiction for The Guardian and reviews for the London Review of Books and the New Statesman. He has been a contributor to BBC Two's Newsnight Review and BBC Radio 4's In Our Time. He was a judge for The Best of the Booker in 2008 and for the Man Booker Prize in 2009.

Educated at Downside School and King's College, Cambridge, Mullan was a research fellow at Jesus College, Cambridge, and a lecturer at Fitzwilliam College, Cambridge, before moving to UCL in 1994.

== Selected bibliography ==
- Sentiment and Sociability: The Language of Feeling in the Eighteenth Century (Clarendon Press, 1988), ISBN 0-19-812252-7
- Robinson Crusoe (ed.) (Longman, 1992), ISBN 1-85715-016-3
- Eighteenth-century Popular Culture: A Selection (ed. with Christopher Reid) (Oxford University Press, 2000), ISBN 0-19-871135-2
- How Novels Work (Oxford University Press, 2006), ISBN 0-19-928177-7
- Lyrical Ballads (foreword) (Longman, 2007), ISBN 1-4058-4060-9
- Anonymity: A Secret History of English Literature (Princeton University Press, 2008), ISBN 0-691-13941-5
- What Matters in Jane Austen?: Twenty Crucial Puzzles Solved (Bloomsbury, 2012), ISBN 978-1408820117
- The Artful Dickens: Tricks and Ploys of the Great Novelist (Bloomsbury, 2020), ISBN 978-1-4088-6682-5
