= My Life as a Fake =

2003 novel by Peter Carey

- First edition (Australia)
- Author: Peter Carey
- Cover artist: Jenny Griggs
- Language: English
- Publisher: Knopf (Australia & US); Faber & Faber (UK)
- Publication date: 2003
- Publication place: Australia
- Media type: Print (hardback and paperback)
- Pages: 269
- ISBN: 9781740512565
- OCLC: 224742366
- Preceded by: True History of the Kelly Gang
- Followed by: Theft: A Love Story

My Life as a Fake is a 2003 novel by Australian writer Peter Carey based on the Ern Malley hoax of 1943, in which two poets created a fictitious poet, Ern Malley, and submitted poems in his name to the literary magazine Angry Penguins.

The novel was inspired by the idea of "a 24-year-old hoax brought to life – original, angry, multilingual, learned. He was interested in what the being would know instinctively and what he would be ignorant of. How would the creator deal with his creation, and the creation with his creator?" He realised as he was writing the book that he was not interested in James McAuley and Harold Stewart who perpetrated the hoax but in "magical thinking".

It is told as a first-person narrative from the point of view of a young woman editing a literary magazine, and is presented as her account of her encounter with the perpetrator of the hoax after many years. However, it was originally written in the voice of "the created being". Carey takes a number of significant liberties in his novelization, not the least of which is his decision to make the Ern Malley counterpart (called Bob McCorkle in the story) an actual person who ends up haunting his "creator."

== Themes ==
A major theme of the novel is the ambiguity of reality, as the reader must wrestle with the question of whether the man claiming to be Bob McCorkle is a maniac with an identity delusion, a hoaxer's hoaxer, a coincidence, or a phantasm called into being by his creator. As a discussion of and commentary on modern poetry, particularly Australian poetry, the novel makes many references to Ezra Pound, T. S. Eliot, W. H. Auden, and Walt Whitman, who can be seen to have had an influence on Carey.

== Awards and nominations ==
- 2004: The Age Book of the Year - shortlisted
- 2004: Commonwealth Writers Prize (South East Asia and South Pacific Region, Best Book) - shortlisted
- 2004: Kiriyama Pacific Rim Book Prize, Fiction - finalist
- 2004: Miles Franklin Award - shortlisted
- 2004: Queensland Premier's Literary Awards, Best Fiction Book - shortlisted
- 2005: International Dublin Literary Award - longlisted
