= Amnesia (Carey novel) =

2014 novel by Peter Carey

- Author: Peter Carey
- Language: English
- Genre: Literary
- Publisher: Faber & Faber
- Publication date: 2014
- Publication place: Australia
- Media type: Print (hardback)
- Pages: 384 pp
- ISBN: 9781926428604
- Preceded by: The Chemistry of Tears

Amnesia is a 2014 novel by Australian author Peter Carey.

== Plot summary ==
The novel follows the story of journalist Felix Moore who is writing an investigative piece about Gaby Baillieux, a young Australian computer hacker. Baillieux has written a computer virus which is originally intended to open the doors of Australian prison cells, but which also finds its way to the US.

The novel makes connections between various incidents in Australia's past (the 1942 Battle of Brisbane and the 1975 sacking of the Whitlam government) to build a picture of conspiracy and political interference.

== Reviews ==
- Andrew Motion in The Guardian
- Ron Charles in The Washington Post

== Awards ==
- 2015 shortlisted for the Prime Minister's Literary Awards – Fiction
- 2015 shortlisted for the Indie Book Awards Book of the Year – Fiction
- 2015 longlisted for the ALS Gold Medal
- 2015 shortlisted for the Australian Book Industry Awards (ABIA) - Australian Literary Fiction Book of the Year
