= The Unusual Life of Tristan Smith =

Novel by Peter Carey

- First edition (Australia)
- Author: Peter Carey
- Cover artist: Craig Voevodin
- Language: English
- Publisher: UQP (Australia); Faber & Faber (UK); Knopf (US)
- Publication date: 1994 (Australia & UK); 1995 (US)
- Publication place: Australia
- Media type: Print (hardback and paperback)
- Preceded by: The Tax Inspector
- Followed by: Jack Maggs

The Unusual Life of Tristan Smith is a novel by the Australian writer Peter Carey. It was first published by the University of Queensland Press in Australia and Faber & Faber in the United Kingdom in 1994. Subsequent editions and translations have appeared in the United States, France, Germany, and elsewhere.

== Premise ==
The principal character and narrator is a boy (in later sections a young man), Tristan Smith, who has been born with malformations to his face and limbs so extensive that the physicians who perform the delivery recommend that he be given no care. His mother, an unmarried actress named Felicity Smith, rejects the doctors' advice and takes the infant home.

Tristan is largely raised on the premises of the Feu Follet, an avant garde theatre collective of which his mother is the guiding force. His presumptive father is Bill Millefleur, an actor in the troupe and Felicity's lover, but two other men also exercise paternal roles in his life to an extent. One is Vincent Theroux, a manufacturer and politician, who has also been Felicity's lover; the other is Wally Paccione, an ex-convict who is the production manager of the Feu Follet.

Tristan can not walk normally and his speech is hard for others to understand, but in spite of his physical limitations, he discovers a vocation as a performer.

== Setting ==
The first of the novel's two sections takes place in Efica, an invented country occupying an archipelago in the Southern Hemisphere. The map published in the US edition suggests a version of New Zealand. Tristan is born in Chemin Rouge, Efica's capital, and visits other parts of the country during the Feu Follet's annual regional tours. His mother, however, is not a native Efican, having been born and raised in a distant and more powerful fictional nation, Voorstand, which on the map loosely resembles Australia. The second half of the novel follows Tristan's travels in Voorstand.

Like Peter Carey's native Australia, Efica was founded, at least in part, as a penal settlement. It has its own calendar (Tristan is born in the year 371 EC), which begins with the archipelago's first discovery by one Captain Girard. Though Eficans speak English, their vocabulary retains an admixture of French slang, a legacy from French dyers who came to Efica in its early years. The country's principal products are dyestuffs, a fact memorialized in the nicknames of the two major political parties, the Reds and the Blues. Felicity Smith, Vincent Theroux, and the members of the Feu Follet are all supporters of the Efican Democratic Party, as the Blue party is formally known. The Reds favor Efica's unequal alliance with Voorstand, as a result of which a network of Efican caves has been threaded with cable in order to create a giant antenna used to communicate with submarines. The Blues are firmly opposed to the alliance. Parallels with New Zealand's 1980s dispute with the United States and Australia over nuclear weapons can be inferred.

Voorstand is also largely English-speaking, but a substantial portion of its vocabulary is derived from Dutch. It occupies the bulk of a continent several thousand miles across, the fringes of which are occupied by three poorer nations, Zeelung, Morea, and the Republic of Bouke. Voorstand has its own national mythology, centered on several Disneyish animal characters, notably Bruder Mouse ("Brother Mouse") and Oncle Duck ("Uncle Duck"), in addition to a human national saint originally named Meneer Van Kraligan. According to a legend recorded in Tales of Bruder Mouse, Van Kraligan had raised Oncle Duck and was about to eat him when Bruder Mouse appeared and performed a comic routine of acrobatics. As Van Kraligan runs off to fetch the neighborhood children to witness the sight, Oncle Duck and Bruder Mouse escape. That and similar legends are the origin of both the Voorstand "Sirkus" (an elaborate—and not infrequently fatal—multimedia extravaganza) and the Voorstanders' religious taboo against exploiting animals in circus performances.

The US edition, published by Alfred A. Knopf, inc. in 1995, includes maps of both Efica and Voorstand.

== Themes and notes ==
The political and cultural dynamics of the relationship between Voorstand and Efica recall the relationship between the United States and third-world or peripheral countries. Some elements of Voorstand's history and culture are also reminiscent of the Boers.

Almost the entire novel takes place within the worlds of the theatre or of the circus. Tristan's short stature and deformities place him in an equivocal position as both a serious actor (and devotee of Stanislavski) and as a circus "freak."

Tristan Smith's initials and first name suggest the hero of Laurence Sterne's Tristram Shandy.

A group of islands in the southern portion of Efica bear the name of "the Madeleines," apparently because their shape resembles the French cakes of that name.

== Awards ==
- The Age Book of the Year Award, Fiction Prize, 1994: winner
- The Age Book of the Year Award, Book of the Year, 1994: winner
