= Jack Maggs =

Novel by Peter Carey

- Author: Peter Carey
- Language: English
- Genre: Parallel novel
- Publisher: UQP (Australia); Faber & Faber (UK); Knopf (US)
- Publication date: 1997 (Australia & UK); 1998 (US)
- Publication place: Australia
- Media type: Print (hardback)
- Pages: 392
- ISBN: 0-7022-2952-0
- OCLC: 37500556
- Dewey Decimal: 823 21
- LC Class: PR9619.3.C36 J33 1997
- Preceded by: The Unusual Life of Tristan Smith
- Followed by: True History of the Kelly Gang

Jack Maggs (1997) is a novel by Australian novelist Peter Carey.

== Plot summary ==
Set in 19th century London, Jack Maggs is a reworking of the Charles Dickens novel Great Expectations. The story centres around Jack Maggs (the equivalent of Magwitch) and his quest to meet his 'son' Henry Phipps (the equivalent of Pip), who has mysteriously disappeared, having closed up his house and dismissed his household.

Maggs becomes involved as a servant in the household of Phipps's neighbour, Percy Buckle, as he attempts to wait out Phipps or find him in the streets of London. He eventually cuts a deal with the young and broke up-and-coming novelist Tobias Oates (a thinly disguised Charles Dickens) that he hopes will lead him to Phipps. Oates, however, has other plans, as he finds in Maggs a character from whom to draw much needed inspiration for a forthcoming novel which he desperately needs to produce.

== Critical reception ==
Hermione Lee called the book "an imaginative and daring act of appropriation".

Kirkus Reviews found the plot device of writing letters to be a weight on this story: "His incessant letter-writing, though, used to explain his past to his boy (and to us), proves a cumbersome device."

Caryn James wrote well of this novel, a parallel to the works and life of Dickens: many authors try "to fill in the gaps of great novels. . . . usually with shabby results. Carey is up to something more sophisticated, and his relation to Dickens's work is playfully skewed." She said that "Carey's invention and uncompromising fidelity to character are sustained almost to the finish". However the "ending carries a heavy load of Dickensian sentimentality". What she found most convincing about the plot is "the depiction of how Maggs has been brain-washed by centuries of upper-class English propaganda."

Publishers Weekly also had a strongly positive review of this novel, remarking that "Carey's memorable characters can stand proudly in the pantheon beside those of Dickens." Themes in the novel are well handled: "the thin line between respectability and ruin, the corrupting power of money and the cruelty of class distinctions are themes that Carey rings with adroit authority." The story begins with the return of Maggs to London in 1837; though successful in Australia, he is a dead man if identified. Though he left Australia as a successful man, his stay there began in the penal colony decades earlier.

== Awards and nominations ==
- 1998 Miles Franklin Award, winner
- 1998 Commonwealth Writers Prize, South-East Asia and South Pacific Region, Best Book, winner
- 1998 Commonwealth Writers Prize, Overall Best Book Award, winner
- 1997 The Age Book of the Year Fiction Prize, winner
