= Theft: A Love Story =

2006 novel by Peter Carey

- First edition (Australia)
- Author: Peter Carey
- Cover artist: Jenny Grigg; Tomek Sikora (photo)
- Language: English
- Publisher: Knopf (Australia & US); Faber & Faber (UK)
- Publication date: 9 May 2006
- Publication place: Australia
- Media type: Print (hardback & paperback)
- Pages: 272 pp
- ISBN: 0-307-26371-1
- OCLC: 62331104
- Preceded by: My Life as a Fake
- Followed by: His Illegal Self

Theft: A Love Story is a novel by Australian writer Peter Carey. It won the 2006 Vance Palmer Prize, the Victorian Premier's Literary Award prize for fiction.

== Plot summary ==
Theft is the story of Michael "Butcher" Boone, an Australian artist whose career is having an early and comprehensive twilight. The novel alternates between the viewpoint of Butcher himself, and that of his "damaged two hundred and twenty pound brother" Hugh. "There is always Hugh," Butcher says, "and you cannot take a slash or park the truck without considering him." As the novel opens, Butcher is fresh out of jail for robbing his ex-wife of his own paintings, paintings that became hers when the marriage ended. Exiled to a remote house owned by a fussy former patron, Butcher is trying to get his career back on track, avoid his creditors and manage Hugh, when - on a stormy, flooding evening - he receives a visit from the mysterious Marlene, described by Hugh as "a GAMINE with tiny boobies and a silk dress you could have fitted in your pocket with your hanky".

Through marriage to Olivier Leibovitz, Marlene is the holder of the droit moral, the hereditary right to authenticate paintings, in this case those of Olivier's dead father, Jacques Leibovitz. Somehow, Butcher and Hugh's farmer neighbour has recently acquired a Leibovitz of mysterious provenance, and Marlene arrives, a vision in Manolo Blahniks tramping through knee-deep mud, to put a validating stamp on it, immediately sending its worth into the stratosphere.

== Awards and nominations ==
- Victorian Premier's Literary Award, The Vance Palmer Prize for Fiction, 2006: winner
- Man Booker Prize, 2006: longlisted
- Commonwealth Writers Prize, South East Asia and South Pacific Region, Best Book, 2007: shortlisted
- Miles Franklin Literary Award, 2007: shortlisted
- New South Wales Premier's Literary Awards, Christina Stead Prize for Fiction, 2007: winner
- Australian Book Industry Awards (ABIA), Australian Literary Fiction Book of the Year, 2007: shortlisted
- International Dublin Literary Award, 2008: longlisted

== Reviews ==
- The Guardian: "..let me be entirely clear about this: Theft: A Love Story is a novel that will get right up your nose. Carey has produced a humane, gloriously Australian book of grand passion, bad breath and high mischief. It is a rudely brilliant, infuriatingly beautiful, belligerently profane work of art."
- The Washington Post: "Carey frames a story that shifts before our eyes -- maddeningly complex, hypnotically brilliant, entirely original."
