= Peter Coleman-Wright =

Australian operatic baritone (born 1958)

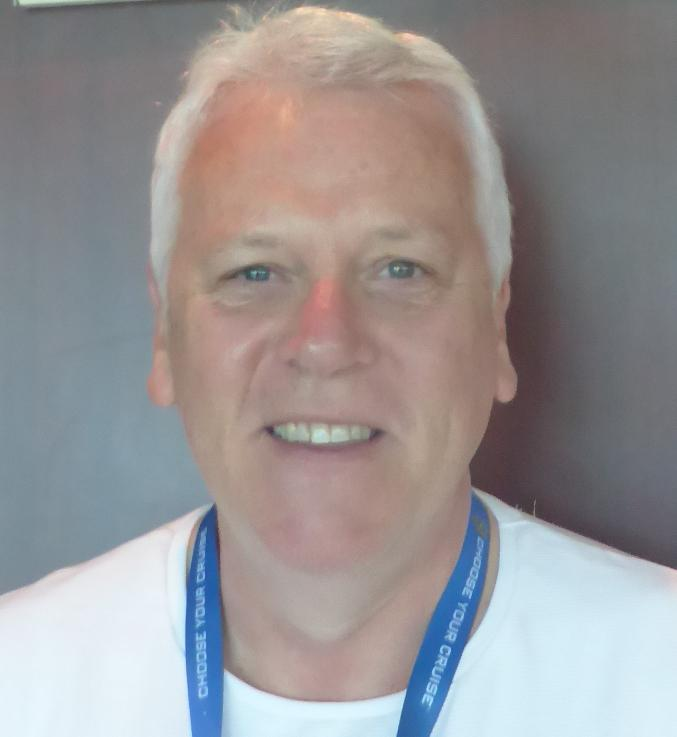
Peter Coleman-Wright, 2016

Peter Coleman-Wright AO (born 13 October 1958) is an Australian baritone from Geelong. He began his career at Glyndebourne Festival Opera, where he sang Guglielmo in Così fan tutte, winning the Touring Prize. Subsequently, he sang Sid in Albert Herring and Demetrius in A Midsummer Night's Dream and Pizzaro in Fidelio.

== Career ==
He performed many roles for English National Opera (ENO) including Don Giovanni, Figaro, Billy Budd, Onegin, Scarpia, Michele in Il tabarro, Toreador, The Forester in The Cunning Little Vixen, Traveller in Death in Venice, Henze's Prince von Homburg, and The Prisoner by Dallapiccola. He made his Royal Opera Covent Garden debut as Dandini in La Cenerentola and has sung many roles for the company for 20 years. Roles include Billy Budd, Papageno, Don Alvaro in Il viaggio a Reims, The Narrator in Paul Bunyan, Marcello, Ping, Donner, Gunther and Beckmesser.

A champion of new works, he has premiered several roles for ENO, namely The Plumber's Gift by David Blake and Inquest of Love by Jonathan Harvey and Caligula by Detlev Glanert.

He made his European debut as the Soldier in Busoni's Doktor Faust for Netherlands Opera and subsequently worked for Bordeaux, Geneva, Bastille Paris, La Fenice Venice, Munich, Vienna, Brussels, Bregenz and Aix-en-Provence Festivals, La Scala Milan singing many roles including Don Giovanni, the Count in The Marriage of Figaro, Marcello, Sharpless in Madama Butterfly, The Traveller in Death in Venice and The Forester.

He made his American debut as Don Giovanni at New York City Opera and his Metropolitan Opera debut as Dr. Falke in Die Fledermaus returning for Marcello, Fieramosca (Benvenuto Cellini) and Belcore in L'elisir d'amore. He sang Sharpless for the opening of the new theatre at Santa Fe and Rodrigo in Don Carlos and Sharpless for Houston Grand Opera. He also created the role of Henry Miles in Jake Heggie's The End of the Affair.

He has sung many roles for Opera Australia, including Golaud (Pelléas et Mélisande), Billy Budd, Scarpia, Don Giovanni, Mandryka, Macbeth, Sweeney Todd, The Traveller for which he won Helpmann Award in 2006 for best supporting male. He created the role of Harry Joy in Brett Dean's 2010 opera Bliss (Brett Dean wrote the role especially for Coleman-Wright) which he also performed at the Edinburgh International Festival. He was the soloist in the performance of Dean's The Last Days of Socrates which won the 2014 APRA Award for Performance of the Year.

He has been an active concert singer working with many conductors and in concert halls, including Royal Albert Hall, London South Bank, Barbican, Wigmore Hall, Théâtre du Châtelet, Concertgebouw Amsterdam, St Cecilia Rome, Luxembourg, Aldeburgh Festival, and Avery Fisher Hall New York.

At the 2002 Helpmann Awards, he won the Helpmann Award for Best Male Actor in a Musical for his role in Sweeney Todd: The Demon Barber of Fleet Street. The recording of Britten's The Rape of Lucretia with Coleman-Wright won the 2014 International Classical Music Award. Coleman-Wright was awarded an Officer of the Order of Australia (AO) in the 2015 Queen's Birthday Honours. In 2019, he played Sir Danvers Carew in the 25th Anniversary Concert of Jekyll & Hyde.

In 2020, he was appointed artistic director for National Opera Canberra and, with his wife as co-artistic director, for Pacific Opera, Sydney.

== Personal life ==
Coleman-Wright is married to operatic soprano Cheryl Barker and they have a son, Gabriel. Along with his wife, he was awarded an Honorary Doctorate from the University of Melbourne in 2009, and they both received the Order of Australia in 2015. The couple first performed together in a high school production of The Boy Friend at Belmont High in Geelong. Since then, they have performed together in Tosca (2002, ENO and 2005, Opera Australia), the world premiere of Jake Heggie's The End of the Affair (2004, Houston Grand Opera), Arabella (2008, Opera Australia, Sydney Opera House and State Theatre (Melbourne)).

They gave several concert recitals together, (2008 in Sydney with Piers Lane, 2012 in Melbourne with Ensemble Liaison) and the semi-staged performance of Kiss Me, Kate in 2016 at QPAC in Brisbane. In 2021, Coleman-Wright sang Jupiter in Neil Armfield's production of Rameau's Platée for Pinchgut Opera opposite Barker's Juno. They returned to QPAC in 2022 with a recital of mainly Lieder and mélodies, "A LifeTogether in Songs". In 2025, the couple sang in Leonard Bernstein's two-hander, Trouble in Tahiti at the Eternity Playhouse, Sydney.

== Recordings ==
- Delius: Requiem/A Mass of Life (1997)
- The Pilgrim's Progress (1998)
- Delius – Fennimore and Gerda (1998)
- Britten: Paul Bunyan (2000)
- Mendelssohn – Paulus (2001)
- Strauss – Die Liebe der Danae (2001)
- Persuasion & Seduction (2002), opera duets, with Cheryl Barker, Tasmanian Symphony Orchestra, Martin André conducting
- Opera: The Greatest Moments Ever (2006)
- Berlioz: Benvenuto Cellini (2008)
- Igor Stravinsky: Oedipus Rex; The Firebird (2008)
- Britten: Owen Wingrave (2008)
- Edward Collins: Daughter of the South (2010)
- Walton: Belshazzar's Feast, Symphony No.1 (2011)
- The Marriage of Figaro (2011)
- Britten – The Rape of Lucretia (2013)
- Ballads of the Pleasant Life – Kurt Weill, Weimar and Exile (2017), with Nexas Quartet, Benjamin Burton (piano), ABC Classics

== Awards ==
=== Mo Awards ===
The Australian Entertainment Mo Awards (commonly known informally as the Mo Awards), were annual Australian entertainment industry awards. They recognise achievements in live entertainment in Australia from 1975 to 2016. Peter Coleman-Wright won two awards in that time.

Year	Nominee / work	Award	Result (wins only)
1999	Peter Coleman-Wright	Operatic Performer of the Year	Won
2001	Peter Coleman-Wright	Classical/Opera Performer of the Year	Won
