= Barry Otto =

Australian actor (born 1941)

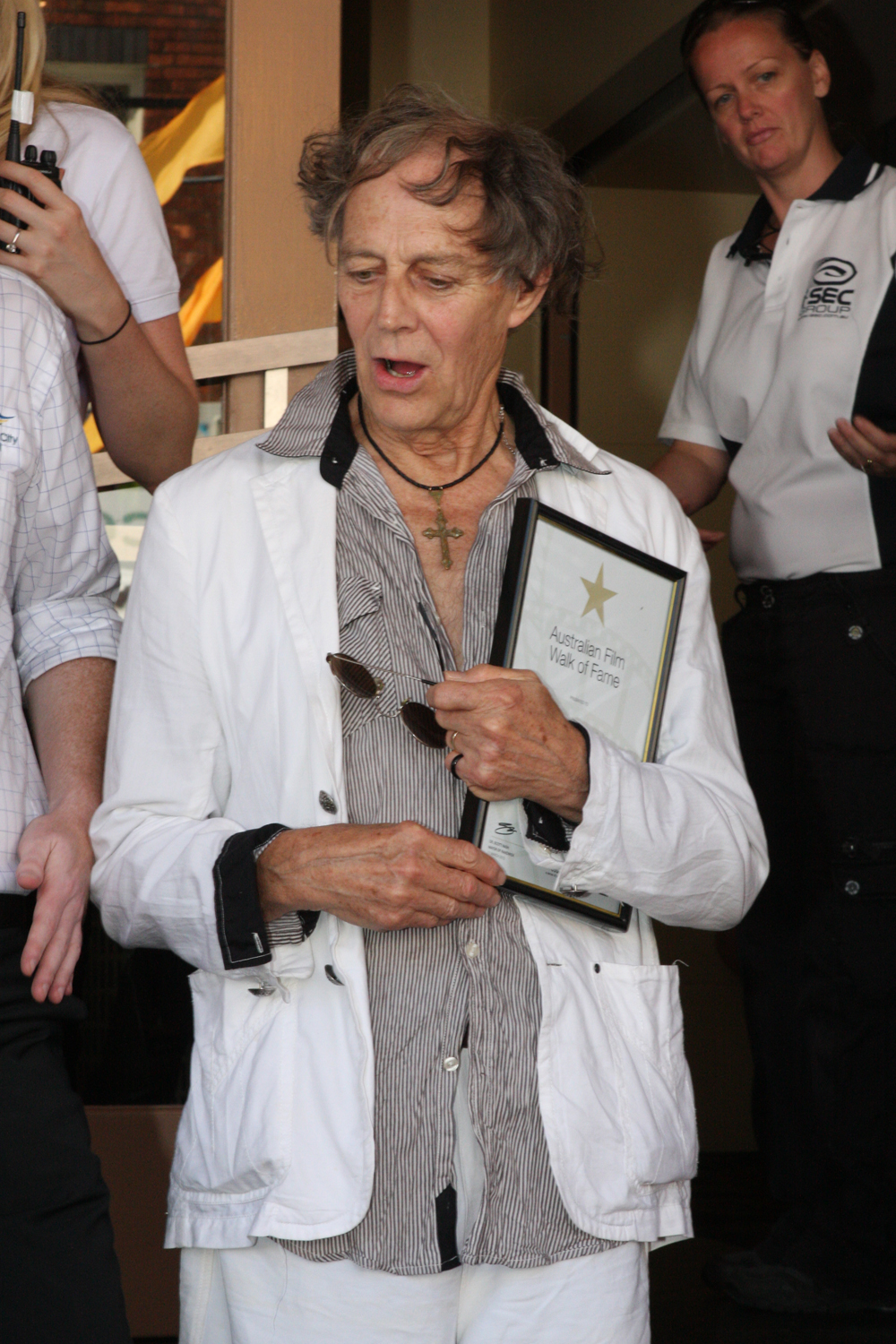
- Otto at the Spot Festival in March 2012
- Born: 1941 (age 84–85); Brisbane, Queensland, Australia
- Education: Brisbane Central Technical College
- Occupation: Actor
- Years active: 1975–present
- Spouses: Lindsay Clayton (div. 1973); Susan Hill
- Children: 3, including Miranda and Gracie Otto

Barry Otto (born 1941) is an Australian actor.

== Early life ==
Barry Otto was born in 1941 in Brisbane, the son of Alice Long and Bob Stephens, a car dealer from the suburb of Chermside. His mother later married Ronald Otto, a butcher of German ancestry. Barry is actually of Scottish and Irish descent. He has a sister named Denise, who was a model.

Otto's artistic talents were discovered at the age of 17, by the family landlord, May Stephens. She had found him painting a watercolour replica of one of the Norman Lindsay paintings she owned, after which she paid for him to attend Brisbane Central Technical College. Stephens also took him to the theatre and the opera, which inspired him to follow his passion for the arts.

In the 1960s, Otto worked as a commercial artist and fashion illustrator, for the likes of Myer and McWhirters, while he took classes in cutting and designing, with dreams of becoming a fashion designer.

Otto started his acting career in amateur theatre, but never formally trained as an actor.

== Career ==
Otto began acting in amateur theatre and drawing room comedies in the 1970s.

He has starred in numerous films, including playing Harry Joy in Bliss (1985), for which he received a Film Critics Circle of Australia Award for Best Actor. His performance as Doug Hastings (father of Paul Mercurio's Scott) in Baz Luhrmann's first feature film Strictly Ballroom (1992) earned him two awards for Best Supporting Actor from the Australian Film Institute and Film Critics Circle of Australia. He then appeared in Dad and Dave: On Our Selection (1995), opposite Geoffrey Rush and Noah Taylor and Lilian's Story (1996) alongside Toni Collette. In 1996, he starred as mental health patient Roy in Cosi for which he received a Green Room Award for Best Actor.

In 1997 he starred in The Nice Guy with Jackie Chan, and played Jimmy D’Abbs in Oscar and Lucinda, opposite Cate Blanchett. The same year he had a role in Kiss or Kill (1997), before appearing in Dead Letter Office, opposite daughter Miranda in 1998. He went on to star in 2002 short film The Visitor, romantic drama Love's Brother (2004) and horror feature Rogue (2007).

Otto portrayed Administrator Allsop in Baz Luhrmann epic adventure drama Australia with Hugh Jackman and Nicole Kidman in 2008, and the same year also starred in Three Blind Mice and drama film Newcastle. Further film credits include Baz Luhrmann's The Great Gatsby (2013) with Leonardo DiCaprio and Tobey Maguire, and comedy drama film The Dressmaker (2015) starring Kate Winslet and Liam Hemsworth.

Otto has also performed voicework, including narrating the 2001 animated short Dad’s Clock He voiced a character in 2010 animated film Legend of the Guardians: The Owls of Ga'Hoole and in 2015, he voiced the role of Mayor Wilberforce Cranklepot, a goanna, in animated feature Blinky Bill the Movie.

Otto has worked extensively in television, beginning with an ongoing role as Trevor McKenzie in Grundy's soap opera Until Tomorrow in 1975. He later starred as Douglas Goddard in the acclaimed 1987 miniseries Vietnam alongside Nicole Kidman. His other miniseries credits include The Dismissal (1983), The Paper Man (1990) and Through My Eyes (2004) alongside daughter Miranda.

He starred as Sir Jeffrey in dance series Dance Academy in 2013, and as Julius Bechly in Sisters in 2017. In 2023, the film Australia received a spin-off miniseries, Faraway Downs in which Otto reprised his role as Administrator Alsop.

He has also had guest roles in Case for the Defence, Spring & Fall and A Country Practice, Shadows of the Heart, G.P., Murder Call, Outriders, Farscape, The Secret Life of Us, HeadLand, All Saints, Stupid Stupid Man, Rake and The Other Guy.

Additionally, Otto has appeared in numerous theatre productions during his career, including The Marriage of Figaro for which he won a 1991 Green Room Award. He received another 1994 Green Room Award for his performance as Roy in the MTC's production of Cosi, the same part he played in the original 1992 Belvoir production and the 1996 feature film.

Playing Captain Andy in the Mariner Theatre’s Showboat in 1999 saw him nominated for another Green Room Award. His role in Last Cab to Darwin earned him a 2005 Adelaide Theatre Guide Award nomination for Best Individual Male Performance, while his performance in Tartuffe for the Melbourne Theatre Company earned him yet another Green Room Award nomination in 2008.

Otto's daughter Gracie directed Otto By Otto, a 2024 documentary film for Revealed on Stan, celebrating the life and career of her father. The film was a finalist for the Documentary Australia Award at the Sydney Film Festival, and won the 2025 AACTA Award for Best Documentary.

== Personal life ==
Otto married Lindsay Clayton, whom he met while performing in amateur theatre in Brisbane. They appeared together in a Brisbane Repertory Theatre 1967 stage production of Goodnight Mrs Puffin. Together they had a daughter Miranda (also an actress), who was born in Brisbane in 1967. They divorced in 1973.

After his marriage broke down, Otto met second wife Susan 'Sue' Hill (eventual co-founder of Sydney’s Belvoir Street Theatre), whom he credits with "rescuing him". They met at Brisbane's Twelfth Night Theatre box-office and moved to Sydney in the mid-1970s, when Otto was in his mid-30s, settling in Petersham and both scoring jobs at the Nimrod Theatre.

Together with Hill, Otto has a son, Eddie (a teacher and professional cricket coach), and daughter, Gracie (a filmmaker and actress), born in 1987 in Sydney. Through daughter Miranda and her actor husband Peter O’Brien, Otto is grandfather to Darcey O'Brien.

Otto is also an artist. He often paints members of his family and has twice entered the Archibald Prize.

Otto was prone to suffering from depression, which hit an all-time low when he suffered a nervous breakdown after a blow to his confidence when performing in a stage production of The Kreutzer Sonata at the Adelaide Festival.

After a stint in hospital for a hip replacement, in which he became confused, Otto was diagnosed with Alzheimer's disease in 2018. Ultimately, his family decided against telling him, as they feared it would exacerbate his depression.

== Filmography ==
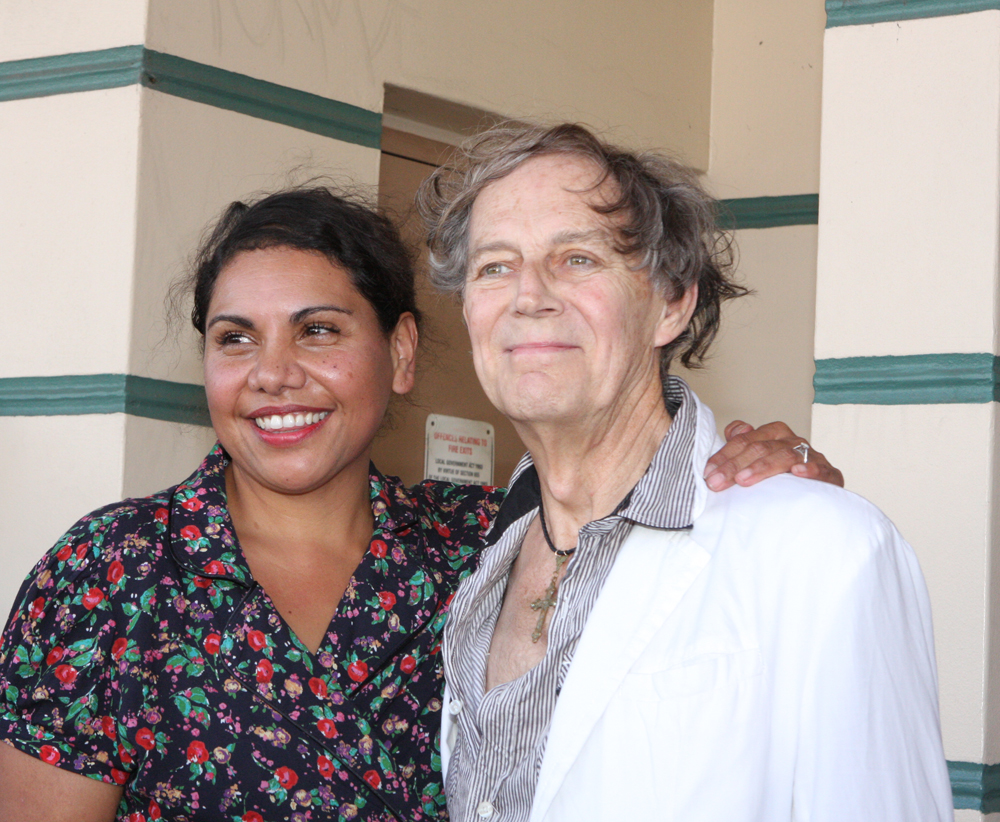
Otto with Australian actress Deborah Mailman in 2012

=== Film ===
Year	Title	Role	Notes
1982	Norman Loves Rose	Charles	Feature film
1983	September '51		Short film
1984	Undercover	Professor Henckel	Feature film
1985	Bliss	Harry Joy	Feature film
1986	The More Things Change...	Lex	Feature film
1987	Howling III: The Marsupials	Professor Harry Beckmeyer	Feature film
1989	The Punisher	Shake	Feature film
1989	Black Sorrow	The Psychiatrist	Short film
1992	Strictly Ballroom	Doug Hastings	Feature film
1993	The Custodian	Brian Ferguson	Feature film
1993	The Door	Stepfather	Short film
1993	Touch Me	Stewart	Short film
1994	Exile	Sheriff Hamilton	Feature film
1995	Dad and Dave: On Our Selection	J.P. Riley	Feature film
1996	Così	Roy	Feature film
1996	Lilian's Story	John Singer	Feature film
1996	My Entire Life (aka Mr Reliable)	The Premier	Feature film
1997	I Love Rachel		
1997	Mr. Nice Guy	Baggio	Feature film
1997	Kiss or Kill	Adler Jones	Feature film
1997	The Beneficiary	Leonard Dunbar	Short film
1997	Oscar and Lucinda	Jimmy D'Abbs	Feature film
1997	A Cut in the Rates		Short film
1998	Dead Letter Office	Gerald Urquhart	Feature film
2002	Dad's Clock	Narrator	Short film
2002	The Visitor	Michael	Short film
2004	Love's Brother	Father Alfredo	Feature film
2005	Are We	Narrator	Short film
2006	Single White Farmer	Poley	Short film
2007	La même nuit	The Concierge	Short film
2007	Soul Mates	Paddy Byrne	Short film
2007	Cheap Seats	Enjouer	Short film
2007	Rogue	Merv	Feature film
2008	Newcastle	Gramps	Feature film
2008	Three Blind Mice	Fred	Feature film
2008	$9.99	Albert (voice)	Feature film (animated)
2008	Australia	Administrator Allsop	Feature film
2008	In a Pig's Eye	The Butcher	Short film
2009	Schadenfreude		Short film
2010	South Solitary	George Wadsworth	Feature film
2010	Legend of the Guardians: The Owls of Ga'Hoole	Echidna (voice)	Feature film (animated)
2010	Seamstress	Clive	Short film
2011	Waiting for the Turning of the Earth	Tom	Short film
2011	To Face the Sun	Father	Short film
2012	A Cautionary Tail	Doctor (voice)	Short film
2013	The Great Gatsby	Benny McClenahan	Feature film
2015	Blinky Bill the Movie	Mayor Wilberforce Cranklepot (voice)	Feature film (animated)
2015	The Dressmaker	Percival Almanac	Feature film
2016	Fish with Legs	Head Fish Warren	Short film

=== Television ===
Year	Title	Role	Notes
1975	Until Tomorrow	Trevor McKenzie	180 episodes
1977	Benny Hill Down Under	Trevor McKenzie	TV movie
1978	Case for the Defence	Doctor	1 episode
1978	Tickled Pink	Leo	TV special
1980	Spring & Fall	Harry Dawson	Anthology series, season 1, episode 5: "The Slammer"
1982	M.P.S.I.B.	Mike Barry	1 episode
1983	The Dismissal		Miniseries, 1 episode
1983	A Country Practice	Bela Szollos	4 episodes
1984	The Secret Discovery of Australia	French Ambassador	TV movie
1984	Singies	Peter	Miniseries, 1 episode
1984	Who Killed Hannah Jane?	James Harnney	TV movie
1985	The Fast Lane	Daniells	1 episode
1986	Studio 86	Mr Van Mint	1 episode
1987	Frontier	Government Agent Archibald Meston	Miniseries, 3 episodes
1987	I've Come About the Suicide	Garfield Lawson	TV movie
1987	Vietnam	Douglas Goddard	Miniseries, 10 episodes
1988	Takeover	George Oppenheimer	TV movie
1989	The Hijacking of the Achille Lauro	Kevin Blaxland	TV movie
1990	The Paper Man	Elliot Calder	Miniseries, 4 episodes
1990	Shadows of the Heart	Charles Munro	2 episodes
1992	G.P.	Geoff Evatt	1 episode
1993	Under the Skin		1 episode
1998	Murder Call	Otis Farrow	Season 2, episodes 10-11: "Deadfall" (parts 1 &2)
2001	Outriders	Antiques Dealer	1 episode
2001	Invincible	Professor	TV movie
2002	Farscape	Dr Tumii	1 episode
2002	Don't Blame the Koalas	Mr Fitch	2 episodes
2004	Loot	Charles Highsmith	TV movie
2005	The Secret Life of Us	Bill Holdforth	Season 4, episode 12: "The Heart of Friday Night"
2005	HeadLand	Professor Day	2 episodes
2006	All Saints	Bob Tyrell	1 episode
2006	Stupid Stupid Man	Principal Cooper	Season 1, 1 episode
2013	Dance Academy	Sir Jeffery	Season 3, 6 episodes
2015	Pypo		1 episode
2016	Rake	Judge Cowper	1 episode
2017	Sisters	Julius Bechly	7 episodes
2019	The Other Guy	Ron	Episode: "New Wheels and Cock Socks"
2023	Faraway Downs	Administrator Alsop	6 episodes

== Theatre ==
Year	Title	Role	Company
1967	Goodnight Mrs Puffin	Nicholas Fordyce	Brisbane Repertory Theatre
1970	Eden House	Bernie Smith	La Boite Theatre, Brisbane
1971	Flash Jim Vaux	Circus Style Performer	Twelfth Night Theatre, Brisbane
1974	Present Laughter		SGIO Theatre, Brisbane
1974	A Doll’s House	Torvald Helmer	SGIO Theatre, Brisbane
1974	A Stretch of the Imagination	Monk	La Boite Theatre, Brisbane
1975	How Does Your Garden Grow?		Twelfth Night Theatre, Brisbane
1976	The Tatty Hollow Story	Ben	Stables Theatre, Sydney
1976	Are You Now Or Have You Ever Been?	Edward Dmytryk / Investigator	Nimrod Theatre, Sydney
1976	The Recruiting Officer	Constable	Nimrod Theatre, Sydney
1976	The Duchess of Malfi	Castruchio / Count Malateste	Nimrod Theatre, Sydney
1976–1977	Travesties	Vladimir Ilyich Ulyanov	Nimrod Theatre, Sydney
1977	Twelfth Night	Orsino	Nimrod Theatre, Sydney
1977	Wild Oats	Ephraim Smooth	Seymour Centre, Sydney
1977	The Tempest	Sebastian	Sydney Opera House
1978	Black Comedy	Brindsley Miller	Sydney Opera House
1978	The Misanthrope	Alceste	Sydney Opera House
1978	Hay Fever	Sandy Tyrell	Canberra Theatre, Sydney Opera House
1978	The Lady from Maxim’s	Dr Petypon	Sydney Opera House
1979	The Bed Before Yesterday	Felix	Theatre Royal Sydney
1979	On Our Selection	Old Carey / Jim Carey	Jane St Theatre, Sydney, Nimrod Theatre, Sydney
1979	Upside Down at the Bottom of the World	D. H. Lawrence	Nimrod Theatre, Sydney
1980	Traitors	Giorgi Krasin	Nimrod Theatre, Sydney
1980	The Bride of Gospel Place	The Master	Jane St Theatre, Sydney
1980	The Dybbuk	Azriel	Jane St Theatre, Sydney
1980	Volpone	Corvino	Nimrod Theatre, Sydney
1981	Three Sisters	Fyodor Ilyich Kulyghin	Nimrod Theatre, Sydney
1981	Protest: Audience / Private View / Protest	Malster / Michal / Stane	Nimrod Theatre, Sydney
1981	Cloud Nine	Clive / Cathy	Nimrod Theatre, Sydney
1981	Tales from the Vienna Woods	Zauberkonig	Nimrod Theatre, Sydney
1982	Welcome the Bright World	Sebastian Ayalti	Nimrod Theatre, Sydney
1982	Burn Victim		Nimrod Theatre, Sydney
1983	Uncle Vanya	Uncle Vanya	Nimrod Theatre, Sydney
1983	The Portage to San Cristobal of A.H.	Adolf Hitler	Sydney Opera House
1987	Tom and Viv	T. S. Eliot	Wharf Theatre, Sydney with STC
1987	Kiss of the Spider Woman		Seymour Centre, Sydney with Nimrod Theatre Company
1988	Frankie and Johnny in the Clair de Lune	Johnny	University of Sydney
1989–1991	The Marriage of Figaro	Figaro	Wharf Theatre, Sydney, Playhouse, Melbourne with STC
1990	Hot Fudge and Icecream		Wharf Theatre, Sydney with STC
1991	Hotel Sorrento	Edwin	Wharf Theatre, Sydney
1992	Cosi	Roy	Belvoir Theatre, Sydney
1993	The Trials of Brother Jero		Courtyard Theatre, Bondi
1993	Faust	Faust	Russell St Theatre, Melbourne with MTC
1994	White Wheat		Domain Theatre, Sydney
1994	Amadeus	Salieri	Melbourne Athenaeum
1994	Cosi	Roy	Russell St Theatre, Melbourne with MTC
1995	The Tempest	Prospero	Belvoir Theatre, Sydney, Space Theatre, Adelaide
1996	Night on Bald Mountain	Hugo	Playhouse Adelaide with STCSA & Belvoir Theatre, Sydney
1996	Wasp		Belvoir Theatre, Sydney
1998	Show Boat	Cap'n Andy	Lyric Theatre Sydney, Regent Theatre, Melbourne
1999	Barrymore	John Barrymore	Sydney Opera House, Glen St Theatre, Sydney, Newcastle Civic Theatre, Cremorne Theatre, Brisbane with STC
2000	The Falls	Director	Stables Theatre, Sydney with Griffin Theatre Company
2002	Volpone	Volpone	Sydney Opera House
2003	Proof	Robert	Sydney Opera House, Glen St Theatre, Sydney
2003–2004	Last Cab to Darwin	Max	Australian tour with Pork Chop Productions
2005	Boy Gets Girl	Les Kennkat	Wharf Theatre, Sydney with STC
2005	King Lear	King Lear	Malthouse Theatre, Melbourne
2007	Troupers	Isaac	Wharf Theatre, Sydney with STC
2007	Who’s Afraid of Virginia Woolf?	Martin	Cremorne Theatre, Brisbane with QTC
2007	Heroes	Philippe	Cremorne Theatre, Brisbane with QTC
2008	Tartuffe	Orgon	Malthouse Theatre, Melbourne with MTC
2008	Hamlet	Polonius	Sydney Opera House, Playhouse, Melbourne with Bell Shakespeare
2009	Optimism	Pangloss	Malthouse Theatre, Melbourne, Sydney Opera House & Royal Lyceum Theatre for Edinburgh Comedy Festival
2012	The Histrionic	The Landlord	Malthouse Theatre, Wharf Theatre, Sydney with STC
2013	The Kreutzer Sonata	Pozdnyshev	STCSA for Adelaide Festival
2015	Seventeen	Ronny	Belvoir Theatre, Sydney
2015	King Lear	King Lear	STC

== Radio ==
Year	Title	Role	Company
1979	What Price Glory?	Pharmacist's Mate	ABC Radio, Sydney

== Awards and honours ==
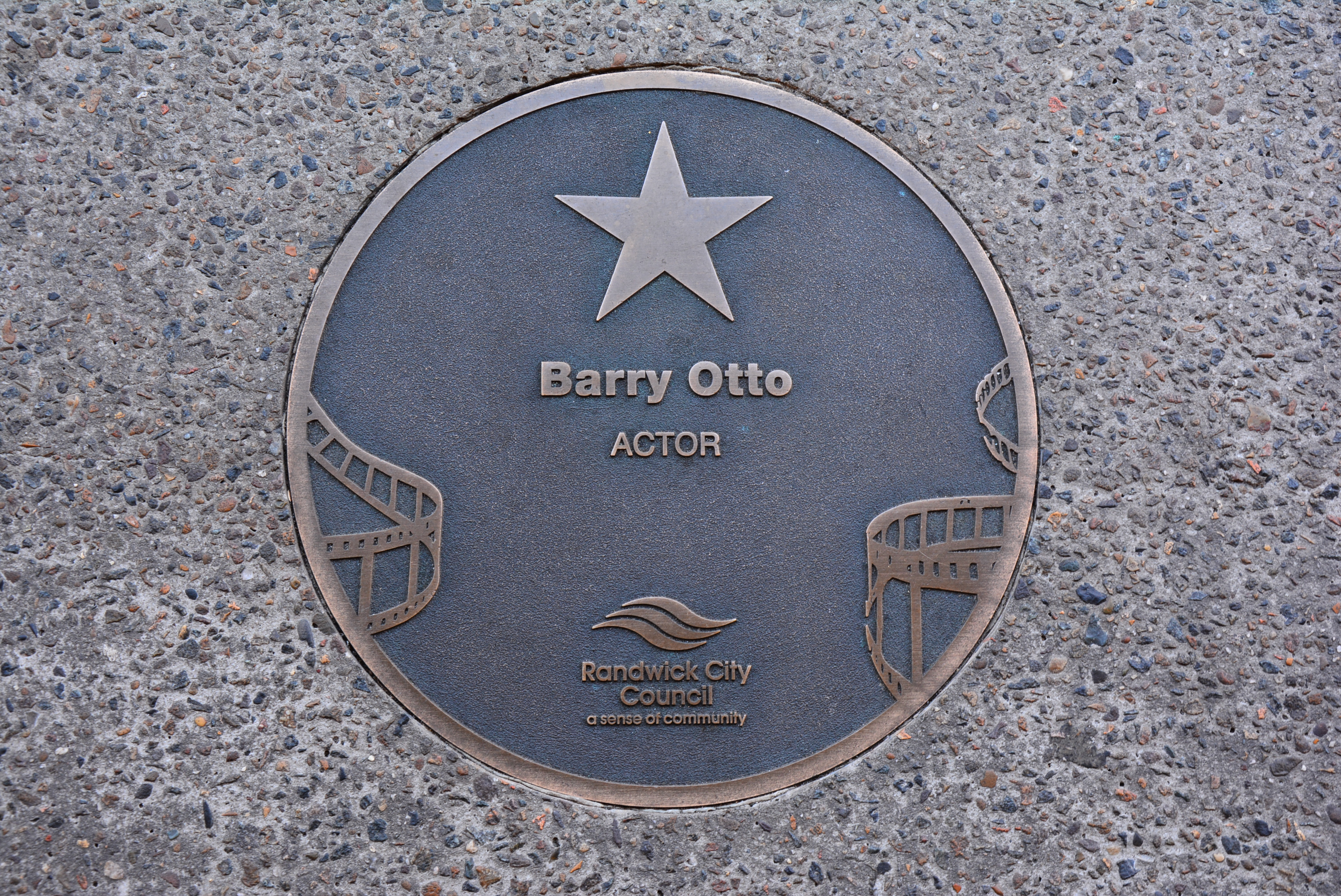
Otto's plaque at the Australian Film Walk of Fame, Ritz Cinema, Randwick, Sydney

=== Honours ===
Otto was inducted into the Australian Film Walk of Fame in 2012 (located outside Ritz Cinema in ‘The Spot’ at Randwick) alongside actress Deborah Mailman. Recipients honoured in years before him were Charles 'Bud' Tingwell (2008), Michael Caton, (2009), Roy Billing (2009), Claudia Karvan (2010), Steve Bisley (2010), Gary Sweet (2011) and Jack Thompson (2011).

=== Awards and nominations ===
Year	Work	Award	Category	Result
1985	Bliss	Australian Film Institute Award	Best Actor in a Leading Role	Nominated
1986	The More Things Change...	Australian Film Institute Award	Best Actor in a Leading Role	Nominated
1991	The Marriage of Figaro	Green Room Award	Leading Male in a Drama	Won
1992	Strictly Ballroom	Australian Film Institute Award	Best Actor in a Supporting Role	Won
1992	Strictly Ballroom	Film Critics Circle of Australia Award	Best Supporting Actor	Won
1993	The Custodian	Australian Film Institute Award	Best Actor in a Supporting Role	Nominated
1994	Cosi (play)	Green Room Award	Leading Male in a Drama	Won
1996	Cosi (film)	Australian Film Institute Award	Best Actor in a Supporting Role	Nominated
1999	Showboat	Green Room Award	Male Artist in a Leading Role	Nominated
2005	Last Cab to Darwin	Adelaide Theatre Guide Award	Best Individual Male Performance	Nominated
2008	Tartuffe	Green Room Award	Best Male Performer	Nominated
2015	Blinky Bill the Movie	Nickelodeon Kids' Choice Awards	Favourite Voice in an Animated Film	Nominated
