= Bliss (1985 film) =

1985 Australian drama film

- DVD cover
- Directed by: Ray Lawrence
- Screenplay by: Ray Lawrence; Peter Carey
- Based on: Bliss by Peter Carey
- Produced by: Anthony Buckley
- Starring: Barry Otto; Lynette Curran; Helen Jones
- Cinematography: Paul Murphy
- Edited by: Wayne LeClos
- Music by: Peter Best
- Production company: Window III Productions
- Distributed by: Anthony Buckley
- Release dates: 18 May 1985 (Cannes); 19 September 1985 (Australia)
- Running time: 112 minutes 130 minutes (Director's cut)
- Country: Australia
- Language: English
- Budget: A$3.4 million
- Box office: A$1,144,863 (Australia) $660,537 (US only)

Bliss is a 1985 Australian comedy-drama film directed by Ray Lawrence, and co-written by Lawrence and Peter Carey, based on Carey's 1981 novel of the same name. It stars Barry Otto, Lynette Curran and Helen Jones.

After a rocky start – 400 of the 2000-strong audience walked out during its first screening at the 1985 Cannes Film Festival – the film went on to receive multiple awards at the AFI awards.

== Plot summary ==
Harry Joy (Barry Otto), an advertising executive in an unnamed Australian city who is known for his ability to tell stories, has a terrifying near-death experience after suffering a massive heart attack, brought on by his dissolute lifestyle. Upon recovering, he believes himself to be either in a hellish version of the world he knew, or with his eyes opened to an altogether different view of that world. He eventually discovers that his wife is unfaithful, his dissolute daughter trades sex for hard drugs with his deviant son, and his latest client is a carcinogenic polluter.

Harry tries to reform and steer a morally correct path, abandoning most of the trappings of his previous affluent life, to the dismay and disruption of everyone around him. He is also seemingly 'tested' by a series of bizarre and frightening events including being 'sectioned' to a psychiatric hospital.

Fighting for his sanity, Harry flees his home and takes up residence in a hotel, where meets a young hippie country girl, Honey Barbara, who prostitutes herself and helps a friend sell marijuana on trips to the city to bring money back to their forest commune. Harry decides that Barbara is his true love but he is soon drawn back into his old ways, and she with him. She eventually rejects Harry's lapse back to materialism and flees to the commune, refusing to see him. Harry pursues her patiently over many years, living alone near her commune, and eventually winning her heart with a 'gift' of plantings of the type of tree that provides Barbara's favourite honey (the yellow box eucalyptus, Eucalyptus melliodora).

== Deleted footage and later restoration ==
In one memorable sequence, Harry is dragged through a bizarre and blackly humorous chain of events, in which he smokes marijuana for the first time with a terminally ill waiter friend, then has his car crushed by an elephant and is finally arrested. The extended version of this sequence was cut from the original theatrical release after its premiere at the Cannes film festival, but the full length scene —featuring a tour-de-force monologue by Barry Otto, which was captured in a single unedited take)— was restored for the film's re-issue in the 1990s.

== Cast ==
VHS cover, depicting the film as a cartoonish comedy

- Barry Otto as Harry Joy
- Lynette Curran as Bettina Joy
- Helen Jones as Honey Barbara
- Miles Buchanan as David Joy
- Gia Carides as Lucy Joy
- Tim Robertson as Alex Duval
- Jeff Truman as Joel
- Bryan Marshall as Adrian Clunes
- Jon Ewing as Aldo
- Kerry Walker as Alice Dalton
- Paul Chubb as Rev Des
- Saskia Post as Harry's Daughter
- George Whaley as Vance
- Robert Menzies as Damien
- Nique Needles as Ken McLaren
- Tommy Dysart as De Vere
- Ritchie Singer as Waiter
- Les Foxcroft as Paul Bees

In cameos are Australian historian Manning Clark as a preacher and comedian John Doyle as Bettina's doctor.

== Production ==
Ray Lawrence and Peter Carey were both working in advertising when they met at a party and became friends. They wrote two screenplays together, Dancing on Water (based on Carey's short story "Life and Death in the South Side Pavilion") and Spanish Pink.

They approached Phillip Adams to see if he wanted to produce; he passed. They then tried Anthony Buckley, who was enthusiastic and tried to find money to produce both scripts, but was unsuccessful. In the meantime, Carey's novel Bliss had been published and won the Miles Franklin Award, so Buckley suggested they adapt that instead. He optioned the rights in January 1983 and raised the money through 10BA.

In October 1983 Lawrence shot a 35mm screen test with Barry Otto and Lynette Curran to help convince investors about the film. Shooting took place in October 1984 following two weeks' rehearsal and went for eleven weeks. Although the film was set in Queensland, it was shot in New South Wales.

== Commercial and critical reception ==
Early responses to Bliss were mixed, as the Cannes walkouts attest. After this Lawrence reduced the film's running time from 135 to 110 minutes.

Its initial Australian release was killed after the Office of Film and Literature Classification classified it as Restricted 18+ because of the incest scene between Harry's children, and as a result, no Australian distributor would handle it. Buckley decided to distribute it himself.

The classification was eventually overturned on appeal and the film opened at the State Theatrette in Sydney, a tiny former newsreel theatrette with 130 seats. Positive reviews and word of mouth helped it to find an audience and become a cult hit. It won three AFI Awards for Best Picture, Best Direction and Best Adapted Screenplay for 1985 and played for six months.

Bliss has since acquired a significantly higher critical reputation. Former Sydney Morning Herald film critic and Sydney Film Festival director Paul Byrnes describes it as:

"... a key film in the story of Australian movies. It represents a kind of liberation point – a leap away from naturalism and the historical realism of the 'new wave' of the 1970s, towards the modernism of the 1990s. To say it was ahead of its time is an understatement – the boldness of its metaphors and the sharpness of its satire were too much for many people in 1985."

Despite the film's eventual success, director Ray Lawrence did not direct another film until Lantana (2001), and in the intervening period he chiefly earned his living as a director of television commercials, several of which won industry awards. His third film, Jindabyne, was released in 2006.

== Home media ==
The theatrical release and director's cut of Bliss was released on DVD by Umbrella Entertainment in May 2010. The DVD is compatible with all region codes and includes special features such as the unauthorised American trailer and audio commentary with Ray Lawrence and Anthony Buckley.

The National Film and Sound Archive of Australia (NFSA) restored the film in 2016.

== Awards ==
The film won the Best Film, Best Director and Best Adapted Screenplay Awards and was nominated for ten other awards of the Australian Film Institute in 1985. It was also nominated for the Palme d'Or (Golden Palm) at the Cannes Film Festival in the same year.
