= Oscar and Lucinda =

1988 Australian novel by Peter Carey

- First edition (Australia)
- Author: Peter Carey
- Cover artist: Pierre Le-Tan
- Language: English
- Genre: Novel
- Set in: England and New South Wales, 1838–1866 and 1970
- Publisher: University of Queensland Press (UQP)
- Publication date: 1988
- Publication place: Australia
- Media type: Print (hardback, Paperback)
- Pages: 528 pp
- ISBN: 0-7022-2116-3
- OCLC: 21002433
- Dewey Decimal: 823.914
- LC Class: MLCM 91/08820 (P) PR9619.3.C36
- Preceded by: Illywhacker
- Followed by: The Tax Inspector

Oscar and Lucinda is a novel by Australian author Peter Carey. It won the 1988 Booker Prize the year it was released, and the 1989 Miles Franklin Award. It was shortlisted in 2008 for The Best of the Booker, in celebration of the prize's 40th anniversary.

== Plot ==
The book tells the story of Oscar Hopkins, an Anglican priest from Devon, England, and Lucinda Leplastrier, a young Australian heiress from Parramatta.

They meet on a ship from England to Australia. Lucinda is the owner of a glass factory in Sydney and is returning from a commercial trip to London. Oscar grew up as the son of a fundamentalist Plymouth Brethren minister and naturalist, who believes he has joined a more compassionate church with the Anglicans.

The travellers discover that they are both gamblers, one obsessive, the other compulsive. Lucinda bets Oscar that he cannot transport a glass church from Sydney to a remote settlement at Bellingen, some 400 km up the New South Wales coast. This bet changes both their lives forever.

== Inspiration ==
A reviewer for The Guardian commented that the novel was influenced by Father and Son, the autobiography of the English poet Edmund Gosse. The poet described his relation with his father, naturalist and minister Philip Henry Gosse.

Carey also noted in his novel some material that he took directly from a book of natural history by the senior Gosse. He concentrates on visual descriptions and information, with glass as a major image and metaphor.

== Adaptation ==
The novel was adapted nine years later into a film of the same name, released in 1997. It was directed by Gillian Armstrong and starred Ralph Fiennes, Cate Blanchett, and Tom Wilkinson.
