= War Crimes (short story collection) =

Short story collection by Peter Carey

- Author: Peter Carey
- Language: English
- Publisher: University of Queensland Press
- Publication date: 1979
- Publication place: Australia
- Media type: Print
- Pages: 282 pp
- ISBN: 0702214167
- Preceded by: The Fat Man in History
- Followed by: The Fat Man in History and Other Stories

War Crimes (1979) is a collection of short stories by Australian writer Peter Carey. It was published by University of Queensland Press in 1979.

The collection includes 13 original stories by the author.

== Contents ==
- "The Journey of a Lifetime"
- "Do You Love Me?"
- "The Uses of Williamson Wood"
- "The Last Days of a Famous Mime"
- "A Schoolboy Prank"
- "The Chance"
- "Fragrance of Roses"
- "The Puzzling Nature of Blue"
- "Ultra-violet Light"
- "Kristu-Du"
- "He Found Her in Late Summer"
- "Exotic Pleasures"
- "War Crimes"

== Critical reception ==
Writing in The Canberra Times Marion Halligan noted: "This imagination of Carey's is a source of amazement throughout the collection of stories. One is conscious of the elaborate construction of other worlds, as close to ours as the reflection in a faintly distorting mirror. The discrepancies tantalise. Carey mostly writes in a grave formal prose the more surrealistic the stories...Myths, fables for our time, worlds of the imagination that illuminate as they cast doubt on the real world: Carey's stories are a stimulating excursion into the relevance of the mysterious. He charms, he amazes, he appals, he amuses; our emotions are not often run through so full a gamut."

== Publication history ==
After its original publication in 1979 the collection was reprinted by the University of Queensland Press in 1981 and 1984.

== Awards ==
The collection won the Christina Stead Prize for Fiction in 1980.

== See also ==
- 1979 in Australian literature
