= War Crimes (film) =

- Directed by: Michael G. Thomas, Nick S. Thomas
- Written by: Michael G. Thomas, Nick S. Thomas
- Produced by: Michael G. Thomas, Nick S. Thomas
- Edited by: Michael G. Thomas, Nick S. Thomas
- Release date: 2005
- Running time: 82 minutes
- Country: United Kingdom
- Languages: English, Serbo-Croatian

War Crimes is a 2005 film starring John Jenner and Earl Palmer. It was written and directed by Thomas Bros.

== Production ==
War Crimes is a low budget ($10,000) British feature film made in the UK in 2005 and set in 1992, during the traumatic events of the split up of Yugoslavia. The film is based in Bosnia, and 40% of the dialogue is in Serbo-Croatian language. This project was shot on Digital Video and is currently being distributed by ITN. This film was shot on location in Wales and England, and features a multinational cast from Belgium, Canada, Finland, Germany, Greece, the UK, and the USA.

== Plot ==
A group of six friends, recently graduated in the UK travel to Bosnia in 1992. As fighting breaks out around the capital Sarajevo the friends are forced to escape overland to the border whilst the fighting spreads. After witnessing a horrific massacre in Bosnia they are pursued by a ruthless Yugoslav People's Army Officer and his brutal Chetnik fighters. With the weather worsening, limited supplies and murderous soldiers behind them, will they ever make it out of Bosnia alive?! Written by Spearhead Films"

== Main cast ==
- John Jenner – Lt. Brcko
- Earl Palmer – Scott
