= Peter Carey (novelist) =

Australian novelist

Peter Carey AO
- Born: Peter Philip Carey; 7 May 1943 (age 83); Bacchus Marsh, Victoria, Australia
- Occupations: Novelist, creative writing teacher
- Writing career
- Period: 1974–present
- Notable works: True History of the Kelly Gang, Oscar and Lucinda, Bliss
- Notable awards: Booker Prize; 1988, 2001

Signature
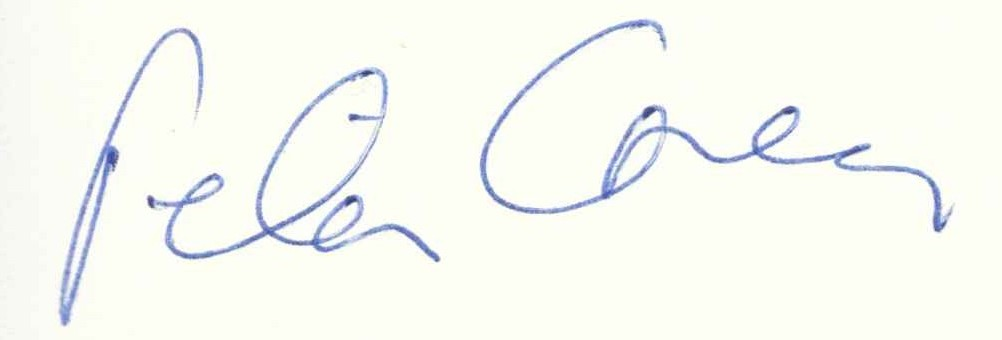

Peter Philip Carey (born 7 May 1943) is an Australian novelist who has lived in New York City for more than three decades.

He is one of only five writers to have won the Booker Prize twice — the others being J. G. Farrell, J. M. Coetzee, Hilary Mantel and Margaret Atwood. Carey won his first Booker Prize in 1988, for Oscar and Lucinda, and won his second Booker Prize in 2001, for True History of the Kelly Gang. In May 2008, he was nominated for the Best of the Booker Prize.

Carey has won the Miles Franklin Award three times, and is frequently named as Australia's next contender for the Nobel Prize in Literature.

In addition to writing fiction, he collaborated on the screenplay of the film Until the End of the World with Wim Wenders and was, for nineteen years, executive director of the Master of Fine Arts in Creative Writing program at Hunter College, part of the City University of New York.

== Early life and career: 1943–1970 ==
Peter Carey was born in Bacchus Marsh, Victoria, in 1943. His parents ran a Holden dealership, Carey Motors. He attended Bacchus Marsh State School from 1948 to 1953, then boarded at Geelong Grammar School between 1954 and 1960. In 1961, Carey enrolled in a science degree at the new Monash University in Melbourne, majoring in chemistry and zoology, but cut his studies short because of a car accident and a lack of interest. It was at university that he met his first wife, Leigh Weetman, who was studying German and philosophy, and who also dropped out.

In 1962, he began to work in advertising. He was employed by various Melbourne agencies between 1962 and 1967, including on campaigns for Volkswagen and Lindeman's Wine. His advertising work brought him into contact with older writers who introduced him to recent European and American fiction: "I didn't really start getting an education until I worked in advertising with people like Barry Oakley and Morris Lurie — and Bruce Petty had an office next door." Carey would later describe Oakley as someone "to whom I owe an enormous debt — almost my life as a writer".

During this time, he read widely, particularly the works of Samuel Beckett, William Faulkner, James Joyce, Franz Kafka, and Gabriel García Márquez, and began writing on his own, receiving his first rejection slip in 1964, the same year he married Weetman. Over the next few years he wrote five novels — Contacts (1964–1965), Starts Here, Ends Here (1965–1967), The Futility Machine (1966–1967), Wog (1969), and Adventures on Board the Marie [sic] Celeste (1971). None of them were published. Sun Books accepted The Futility Machine but did not proceed with publication, and Adventures on Board the Marie Celeste was accepted by Outback Press before being withdrawn by Carey himself. These and other unpublished manuscripts from the period — including twenty-one short stories — are now held by the Fryer Library at the University of Queensland.

Carey's only publications during the 1960s were "Contacts" (a short extract from the unpublished novel of the same name, in Under Twenty-Five: An Anthology, 1966) and "She Wakes" (a short story, in Australian Letters, 1967). Towards the end of the decade, Carey and Weetman abandoned Australia with "a certain degree of self-hatred", travelling through Europe and Iran before settling in London in 1968, where Carey continued to write highly regarded advertising copy and unpublished fiction.

== Middle career: 1970–1990 ==
Returning to Australia in 1970, Carey once again did advertising work in Melbourne and Sydney. He also kept writing, and gradually broke through with editors, publishing short stories in magazines and newspapers such as Meanjin and Nation Review. Most of these were collected in his first book, The Fat Man in History, which appeared in 1974. In the same year, Carey moved to Balmain in Sydney to work for Grey Advertising.

In 1976, Carey moved to Queensland and joined an alternative community named Starlight in Yandina, north of Brisbane, with his new partner, the painter Margot Hutcheson, with whom he lived in the 1970s and 1980s. He remained with Grey, writing in Yandina for three weeks, then spending the fourth week at the agency in Sydney. It was during this time that he produced most of the stories collected in War Crimes (1979), as well as Bliss (1981), his first published novel.

Carey started his own advertising agency in 1980, the Sydney-based McSpedden Carey Advertising Consultants, in partnership with Bani McSpedden. After many years of separation, Leigh Weetman asked for a divorce in 1980 so that she could remarry and Peter agreed. In 1981, he moved to Bellingen in northern New South Wales. There he wrote Illywhacker, published in 1985. In the same year he married theatre director Alison Summers. Illusion, a stage musical Carey wrote with Mike Mullins and composer Martin Armiger, was performed at the 1986 Adelaide Festival of the Arts and a studio cast recording of the musical was nominated for a 1987 ARIA Award (the nomination included Carey as lyricist).

The decade — and the Australian phase of Carey's career — culminated with the publication of Oscar and Lucinda (1988), which won the Booker McConnell Prize (as it was then known) and brought the author international recognition. Carey explained that the novel was inspired, in part, by his time in Bellingen:

I was living in Bellingen in the country. And the little church was down the road, and they wanted to take it away, zip: and I looked at that landscape and I thought – only 200 years ago this was a landscape that was full of Aboriginal stories. So I thought about a moment when that church that I knew, which was being removed from my landscape, might have arrived. I wanted it to arrive intact, whole. And I thought it would come on a barge. And, this is a totally irrational thought, it’s like a dream. I wanted this church, a wooden church, just what I saw, a church in that valley, to come along the Bellingen River on a barge gliding like a dream into the landscape.

== Move to New York: 1990–present ==
Carey sold his share of McSpedden Carey and in 1990 moved with Alison Summers and their son to New York, where he took a job teaching creative writing at New York University. He later said that New York would not have been his first choice of place to live, and that moving there was his wife's idea. Carey and Summers divorced in 2005 after a four-year separation. Carey is now married to the British-born publisher Frances Coady.

The Tax Inspector (1991), begun in Australia, was the first book he completed in the United States. It was followed by The Unusual Life of Tristan Smith (1994), a fable in which he explored the relationship between Australia and America, disguised in the novel as "Efica" and "Voorstand". This is a relationship that has preoccupied him throughout his career, going back to Bliss (1981), Illywhacker (1985), and the early short stories. Nevertheless, Carey continued to set his fiction primarily in Australia and remained diffident about writing explicitly on American themes. In a piece on True History of the Kelly Gang (2001), Mel Gussow reported that:

Periodically he has thought about writing an American-based novel, and he had started one dealing with litigation. But he put it aside for Ned Kelly. Explaining why he continues to set most of his books in Australia, he recalled that one of his students said, "When you change countries you lose your peripheral vision." In that sense, his view of America is still limited. Writing about Australia — its history and its heroes — his perspective is wide and deep.

It was only after nearly two decades in the United States that he embarked on Parrot and Olivier in America (2010), loosely based on events in the life of Alexis de Tocqueville. Carey says "Tocqueville opened a door I could enter. I saw the present in the past. It was accessible, imaginable." Carey continues to extend his canvas; in his novel, The Chemistry of Tears (2012), "contemporary London is brought intimately in touch with ... a 19th-century Germany redolent of the Brothers Grimm".

== Retirement from writing fiction ==
In a 2025 interview Carey said "I'm finished with novels". He explained that he had "got to over a hundred pages" on three different fiction projects in the two or three years after publishing A Long Way from Home in 2017 and remained happy with his technique, but that he no longer experienced the same passionate immersion in the work or the same compulsion to complete the story. Carey said he would continue to write non-fiction.

== Controversies ==
In 1998, Carey was accused of snubbing Queen Elizabeth II by declining an invitation to meet her after winning the Commonwealth Writers Prize for Jack Maggs (1997). While Carey is a republican, in the Australian sense, he insists that no offence was intended:

What happened, he explains, was that he had already been in England recently for a literary festival; he is booked for another trip soon, and had been travelling so much that he asked the prize organisers, "Would it be possible to see Her Majesty when I was actually in London?" "They thought it would be better just to cancel than for me to ask Her Majesty to do that. Then all this stuff started going out in English tabloids."

The meeting did eventually take place, with the Queen remarking, according to Carey, "I believe you had a little trouble getting here."

The unhappy circumstances of Carey's breakup with Alison Summers became public in 2006 when Theft: A Love Story appeared, depicting the toxic relationship between its protagonist, Butcher Bones, and his ex-wife, known only as "the Plaintiff".

In April 2015 he, alongside Michael Ondaatje, Francine Prose, Teju Cole, Rachel Kushner and Taiye Selasi, withdrew as table hosts from the PEN American Center gala in which the French satirical magazine Charlie Hebdo was to be awarded a "Freedom of Expression Courage" award. Carey, a former vice president of PEN, was one of 204 PEN members who signed a letter stating that "An expression of views, however disagreeable, is certainly not to be answered by violence or murder. However, there is a critical difference between staunchly supporting expression that violates the acceptable, and enthusiastically rewarding such expression." Writers including John Berger, Deborah Eisenberg, Eve Ensler and Keith Gessen all abhorred the murders while objecting to the PEN executive's unilateral decision to give the award.

== Awards and distinctions ==
Carey has been awarded three honorary degrees. He has been elected a Fellow of the Royal Society of Literature (1989), an Honorary Fellow of the Australian Academy of the Humanities (2001), a Member of the American Academy of Arts and Sciences (2003), and a Member of the American Academy of Arts and Letters (2016), which has also awarded him its Harold D Vursell Memorial Award (2012). In 2010, he appeared on two Australian postage stamps in a series dedicated to "Australian Legends". On 11 June 2012, Carey was named an Officer of the Order of Australia for "distinguished service to literature as a novelist, through international promotion of the Australian identity, as a mentor to emerging writers." And in 2014, Carey was awarded an honorary Doctor of Letters by Sydney University. In 2021, Carey was named by Carnegie Corporation of New York as an honoree of the Great Immigrants Award.

Carey has won numerous literary awards, including:

Booker Prize	Illywhacker, shortlisted in 1985; Oscar and Lucinda, 1988; True History of the Kelly Gang, 2001; Theft: A Love Story, longlisted in 2006; Parrot and Olivier in America, shortlisted in 2010. Peter Carey, J. M. Coetzee, Hilary Mantel, J. G. Farrell, and Margaret Atwood are the only authors to have won the Booker Prize twice.
Miles Franklin Award	Bliss, 1981; Oscar and Lucinda, 1989; Jack Maggs, 1998; True History of the Kelly Gang, shortlisted in 2001; Theft: A Love Story, shortlisted in 2007
The Age Book of the Year Award	Illywhacker, 1985; The Unusual Life of Tristan Smith, 1994; Jack Maggs, 1997
Colin Roderick Award	Oscar and Lucinda, 1988; True History of the Kelly Gang, 2001
Commonwealth Writers Prize	Jack Maggs, 1998; True History of the Kelly Gang, 2001
New South Wales Premier's Literary Award	War Crimes, 1980; Bliss, 1982
NBC Banjo Award	Bliss, 1982; Illywhacker, 1985; Oscar and Lucinda, 1989
Queensland Premier's Literary Award	True History of the Kelly Gang, 2001
FAW Barbara Ramsden Award	Illywhacker, 1985
Vance Palmer Prize for Fiction	Illywhacker, 1986
Townsville Foundation for Australian Literary Studies Award	Oscar and Lucinda, 1988
South Australia Festival Award	Oscar and Lucinda, 1990
Ditmar Award for Best Australian Science Fiction Novel	Illywhacker, 1986
Prix du Meilleur Livre Étranger	True History of the Kelly Gang, 2003

=== ARIA Music Awards ===
The ARIA Music Awards is an annual awards ceremony that recognises excellence, innovation, and achievement across all genres of Australian music. They commenced in 1987.

Year	Nominee / work	Award	Result	Ref.
1987	Illusion (with Martin Armiger)	Best Original Soundtrack, Cast or Show Album	Nominated	
2015	Bliss (with Opera Australia)	Best Original Soundtrack, Cast or Show Album	Nominated	

== Bibliography ==
=== Novels ===
- Bliss (1981)
- Illywhacker (1985)
- Oscar and Lucinda (1988)
- The Tax Inspector (1991)
- The Unusual Life of Tristan Smith (1994)
- Jack Maggs (1997)
- True History of the Kelly Gang (2000)
- My Life as a Fake (2003)
- Theft: A Love Story (2006)
- His Illegal Self (2008)
- Parrot and Olivier in America (2009)
- The Chemistry of Tears (2012)
- Amnesia (2014)
- A Long Way From Home (2017)

=== Short story collections ===
- The Fat Man in History (1974)
  - "Crabs"
  - "Peeling"
  - "She Wakes"
  - "Life and Death in the Southside Pavilion"
  - "Room No. 5 (Escribo)"
  - "Happy Story"
  - "A Windmill in the West"
  - "Withdrawal"
  - "Report on the Shadow Industry"
  - "Conversations with Unicorns"
  - "American Dreams"
  - "The Fat Man in History"
- War Crimes (1979)
  - "The Journey of a Lifetime"
  - "Do You Love Me?"
  - "The Uses of Williamson Wood"
  - "The Last Days of a Famous Mime"
  - "A Schoolboy Prank"
  - "The Chance"
  - "Fragrance of Roses"
  - "The Puzzling Nature of Blue"
  - "Ultra-Violet Light"
  - "Kristu-Du"
  - "He Found Her in Late Summer"
  - "Exotic Pleasures"
  - "War Crimes"

Stories from Carey's first two collections have been repackaged in The Fat Man in History and Other Stories (1980), Exotic Pleasures (1990), and Collected Stories (1994); the last also includes three previously uncollected stories: "Joe" (Australian New Writing, 1973), "A Million Dollars Worth of Amphetamines" (Nation Review, 1975), and "Concerning the Greek Tyrant" (The Tabloid Story Pocket Book, 1978).

=== Uncollected short stories ===
- "Contacts" (Under Twenty-Five: An Anthology, 1966)
- "Eight Parts of a Whole" (Manic Magazine, 1970)
- "Interview with Yourself" (Manic Magazine, 1970)
- "Structure" (Manic Magazine, 1970)
- "I Know You Can Talk" (Stand Magazine, 1975)
- "The Mad Puzzle King" (Living Daylights, 1975)
- "The Rose" (Nation Review, 1976)
- "The Cosmic Pragmatist" (Nation Review, 1977)
- "The Pleasure Bird" (Australian Playboy, 1979)
- "An Abandoned Chapter" (Overland, 1997)

=== Contributed chapters ===
- "A small memorial" In: Stories of Manhood: Journeys into the Hidden Hearts of Men edited by Steve Biddulph (2009)

=== Juvenile fiction ===
- The Big Bazoohley: A Story for Children (1995)

=== Non-fiction ===
- A Letter to Our Son (1994)
- 30 Days in Sydney: A Wildly Distorted Account (2001)
- Letter from New York (2001)
- Wrong about Japan (2005)

=== Screenplays ===
- Bliss (1985, with Ray Lawrence)
- Until the End of the World (1991, with Wim Wenders)

=== Stage ===
- Illusion (1986, with Mike Mullins and Martin Armiger)

=== Adaptations ===
- Dead End Drive-In (1986, adapted from his short story "Crabs" by Peter Smalley)
- Oscar and Lucinda (1997, adapted from his novel by Laura Jones)
- True History of the Kelly Gang (2019, adapted from his novel by Shaun Grant)
