= Parrot and Olivier in America =

2009 novel by Peter Carey

- Cover of Australian edition
- Author: Peter Carey
- Language: English
- Publisher: Hamish Hamilton (Australia); Knopf/Doubleday (US); Faber & Faber (UK)
- Publication date: 2009 (Australia); 2010 (US & UK)
- Publication place: Australia
- Media type: Print (hardback)
- Pages: 464 pp
- ISBN: 978-1-926428-14-7
- OCLC: 426034998

Parrot and Olivier in America is a novel by Australian writer Peter Carey. It was on the shortlist of six books for the 2010 Man Booker Prize. It was also a finalist for the 2010 National Book Award.

The book, according to its publisher, is "an improvisation on the life of Alexis de Tocqueville", and focuses on Tocqueville's trips to the United States. The novel mimics this life with the fictional character, Olivier de Garmont, to the life of Tocqueville, to help the reader explore Tocqueville's life. The titular "Parrot" is Garmont's secretary, which New York Times reviewer Thomas Mallon describes as "Dickensian" character, and a guardian of Garmont as they explore the American environment.

While Carey was developing the novel, an excerpt was published in 2009 in Granta as "Parrot".

== Critical reception ==
New York Times reviewer Thomas Mallon did not think the novel as a whole was very successful, though the style followed the quality of Carey's other work. He described the novel as "replete with expressed feeling, if too wittily contrived for actual passion" and as well written, with each sentence "matchlessly robust".
