= List of Griffith University people =

This is an incomplete list of Griffith University people, inclusive of the university's Queensland Conservatorium, and including alumni and staff.

== Alumni ==
=== Academia ===
- Brian Fitzgerald, academic and barrister, with expertise in cyber law at the Australian Catholic University
- Peter Monteath, historian and academic at Flinders University
- Lola Montgomery, senior lecturer, SAE Creative Media Institute in Brisbane
- Thomas O'Regan, academic in culture and media studies at the University of Queensland

=== Business ===
- Greg Clark, CEO of Symantec
- Bruce Djite, former footballer, now business executive

=== Government ===
==== Politicians ====
- Jim Chalmers, politician
- Anthony Chisholm, Senator for Queensland
- Peta-Kaye Croft, former state politician
- Mick de Brenni, state politician and minister
- Justine Elliot, federal politician
- Leeanne Enoch, state politician and minister
- Andrew Fraser, former state politician and Deputy Premier; winner of the University Medal
- Gary Hardgrave, former federal politician and minister; and later, Administrator of Norfolk Island
- Joanna Lindgren, former Senator for Queensland
- Matt McEachan, former state politician
- James McGrath, Senator for Queensland and assistant minister
- Aidan McLindon, former state politician
- Lisa Neville, Victorian state politician and minister
- Julie Owens, federal politician
- Duncan Pegg, state politician
- Ted Radke, former state politician
- Phil Reeves, former state politician and minister
- Mark Robinson, state politician
- Meaghan Scanlon, state politician
- Judy Spence, former state politician and former minister
- Amanda Stoker, Senator for Queensland and barrister
- Jackie Trad, state politician and the former Deputy Premier of Queensland
- Ross Vasta, federal politician
- Larissa Waters, former federal politician

==== Civil servants ====
- Dayan Jayatilleka, Sri Lankan academic, diplomat, writer and politician
- Brett Mason, Australian Ambassador to the Netherlands; former Senator for Queensland

=== Humanities ===
==== Arts ====
- Tony Albert, contemporary indigenous artist
- Daniel Amalm, musician and actor and alumnus of the Queensland Conservatorium
- Garry Andrews, contemporary artist
- Jason Barry-Smith, operatic baritone, vocal coach, composer, arranger, and alumnus of the Queensland Conservatorium
- Betty Beath, composer, pianist, and music educator, and alumnus of the Queensland Conservatorium
- Robert Braiden, film director
- Liz Cantor, television personality
- Eddy Chen, violinist, YouTuber
- Ray Chen, violinist and alumnus of the Queensland Conservatorium
- Gerry Connolly, comedian, actor, impressionist, pianist, and alumnus of the Queensland Conservatorium
- Sarah Crane, operatic soprano and alumnus of the Queensland Conservatorium
- Robert Davidson, composer, double bassist, head of composition at University of Queensland School of Music
- Brett Dean, composer, violist, and conductor, and alumnus of the Queensland Conservatorium
- Emma Dean, singer-songwriter and multi-instrumentalist and alumnus of the Queensland Conservatorium
- Lucy DeCoutere, Canadian actress
- Candy Devine, broadcaster, singer, and actress, and alumnus of the Queensland Conservatorium
- Diana Doherty, oboist and alumnus of the Queensland Conservatorium
- Robin Donald, operatic tenor and alumnus of the Queensland Conservatorium
- Helen Donaldson, operatic soprano and alumnus of the Queensland Conservatorium
- Lisa Gasteen AO, internationally acclaimed Australian operatic soprano, and alumnus of the Queensland Conservatorium
- Jayson Gillham, classical pianist and alumnus of the Queensland Conservatorium
- Dami Im, singer-songwriter, multi-instrumentalist performing artist, who represented Australia at Eurovision 2016
- Graeme Jennings, classical pianist and music educator, and alumnus of the Queensland Conservatorium
- Natalie Jeremijenko, experimental design artist
- Jung Ryeo-won, actress and singer
- JVMIE, singer-songwriter and music producer, and alumnus of the Queensland Conservatorium
- Kanon, singer-songwriter and alumnus of the Queensland Conservatorium
- Rosario La Spina, operatic tenor and alumnus of the Queensland Conservatorium
- Piers Lane AO, internationally acclaimed classical pianist and alumnus of the Queensland Conservatorium
- Lola the Vamp, performance artist
- Adam Lopez, pop musician, vocal coach, and session vocalist
- Mirusia Louwerse, soprano and alumnus of the Queensland Conservatorium
- Jackie Marshall, singer-songwriter, screen actor
- Tahu Matheson, pianist and conductor, and alumnus of the Queensland Conservatorium
- Kate Miller-Heidke, singer-songwriter and actress, and alumnus of the Queensland Conservatorium
- Katie Noonan, singer-songwriter and alumnus of the Queensland Conservatorium
- Barnaby Ralph, professional virtuoso recorder player and alumnus of the Queensland Conservatorium
- John Rodgers, composer, improviser, violinist, pianist and guitarist, and alumnus of the Queensland Conservatorium
- Van Thanh Rudd, artist and activist
- Aravinnd Singh, Indian cinematographer
- Barry Singh, artistic director and conductor, and alumnus of the Queensland Conservatorium
- Alaric Tay, Singaporean director, producer and actor
- Amanda Ware, model
- Robert Warren, musician
- Megan Washington, musician and songwriter, and alumnus of the Queensland Conservatorium
- Jonathon Welch AM, choral conductor, opera singer and voice teacher, and alumnus of the Queensland Conservatorium
- Christopher Wrench, organist and lecturer, and alumnus of the Queensland Conservatorium
- Brett Yang, violinist, YouTuber

==== History ====
- Peter Monteath, historian and academic at Flinders University

==== Journalism and media ====
- Alex Deane, political commentator
- Adam Ferguson, photojournalist
- Natalie Gruzlewski, television presenter
- Andrew Lofthouse, co-presenter of Nine News Queensland

==== Literature, writing and poetry ====
- Philip Dean, playwright
- Brentley Frazer, contemporary poet and author
- Nujoom Al-Ghanem, Emirati poet and film director
- Stefanja Orlowska, writer and actress
- Robyn Sheahan-Bright, author and publisher of children's literature
- Ken Spillman, author
- David Vernon, author

==== Philosophy and theology ====
- John Fleming, initially an Anglican minister; later, Catholic priest; subsequently banned from practising ministry
- James Page, anthropologist and peace educator
- Nick Vujicic, Christian evangelist and motivational speaker

=== Law ===
- Anika Wells, former advisor to the federal government, later MP representing the Division of Lilley

=== Medicine and sciences ===
- Mark Elgar, ecologist
- Vanessa Lee-AhMat, first Aboriginal and Torres Strait Islander PhD graduate from the School of Medicine
- Dinesh Palipana, doctor; disability advocate; first quadriplegic intern in Queensland; second quadriplegic medical graduate in Australia

=== Sport ===
- Deborah Acason, weightlifter and criminologist
- Liz Blatchford, triathlete and marine biologist
- Steven Bradbury OAM, short track speed skater and Olympic gold medallist
- Sara Carrigan, cyclist
- Naomi Castle, water polo player and Olympic gold medallist
- Bruce Djite, former footballer, now business executive
- Duncan Free OAM, rower and Olympic gold medallist
- Jeff Horn, professional boxer and former school teacher
- Michael Jeh, former Sri Lankan cricketer
- Katie Kelly OAM, paratriathlete and 2016 Rio Paralympics gold medallist
- Emma McKeon OAM, swimmer and Olympic and Commonwealth Games gold medallist
- Anna-Liza Mopio-Jane, Papua New Guinean swimmer
- Simone Nalatu, Fiji-Australian netball player
- Libby Trickett OAM, retired swimmer and Olympic gold medallist
- Brandon Wakeling, weightlifter

=== Other professions ===
- Fatema Al Harbi (born 1991 or 1992), Bahraini author and peace activist
- Alex James, electrical engineer and author
- Tania Major, Aboriginal activist
- Bo Songvisava, chef and restaurateur
- Felicity Wishart, conservationist and environmental activist

== Administration ==
=== Chancellors ===
Order	Chancellor	Term start	Term end	Time in office	Notes
1	Sir Theodor Bray	24 December 1970	1985	14–15 years	
2	John Sewell	1985	21 March 1988		
3	John Macrossan	1988	2000		
4	Leneen Forde AC	1 June 2000	31 May 2015		
5	Henry Smerdon AM	1 June 2015	September 2022	11 years, 167 days	
6	Andrew Fraser	September 2022	incumbent		

=== Vice-Chancellors ===
Order	Vice-Chancellor	Term start	Term end	Time in office	Notes
1	Frederick Willett AO	30 September 1971	1983	11–12 years	
2	Roy Webb AO	7 January 1985	2002	16–17 years	
3	Glyn Davis	1 January 2002	31 December 2004	2–3 years	
4	Ian O'Connor AC	1 January 2005	31 December 2018	12–13 years	
5	Carolyn Evans FASSA	February 2019	current	incumbent	

== Faculty ==
- Ralf Altmeyer, German virologist
- Donald K. Anton, Chair of International Law
- Lisa Gasteen AO, internally acclaimed Australian operatic soprano
- Graeme Jennings, classical pianist and music educator
- Susanne Karstedt, criminologist
- Nigel Krauth, author, scholar and editor
- Alan Mackay-Sim, biomedical scientist, 2017 Australian of the Year
- Sonya Marshall-Gradisnik, Director of the National Centre for Neuroimmunology and Emerging Diseases
- Jason Nelson, pioneering digital poet and artist
- Nicki Packer, Australian glycobiologist, Principal Research Leader at the Institute for Glycomics
- Charles Page, photographer
- Don Smith OBE (1920–1998), former operatic tenor and singing teacher; father of Robin Donald
