= Vlassenko =

Vlassenko is a surname. Notable people with the surname include:

- Natasha Vlassenko (born 1956), Russian-Australian pianist and teacher
- Lev Vlassenko (1928–1996), Soviet pianist and teacher

== See also ==
- Vlasenko
