= Brisbane Philharmonic Orchestra =

Community orchestra in Brisbane, Australia

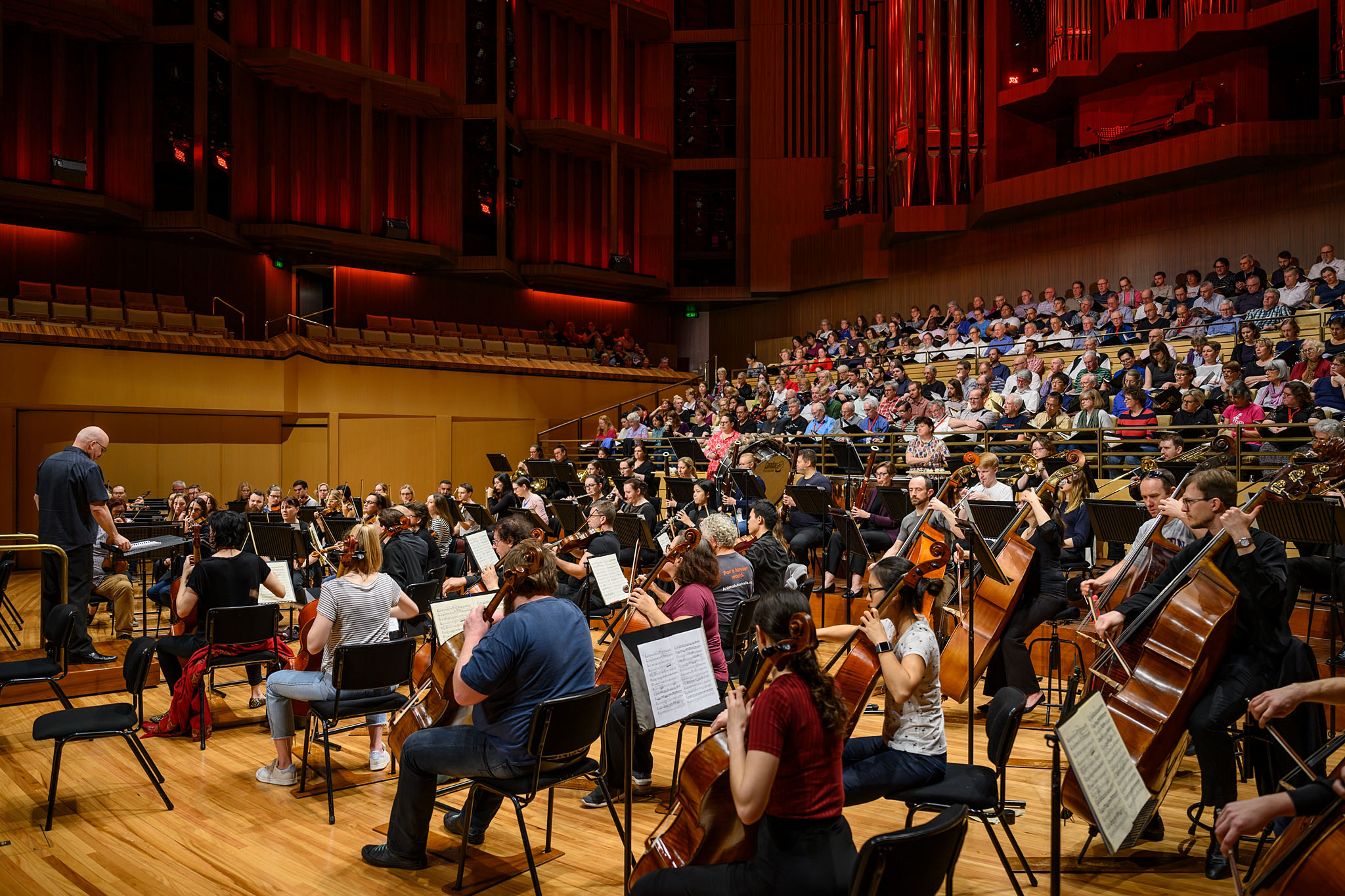
The BPO rehearsing on stage with Brisbane Chorale for a production of Verdi's Requiem.

The Brisbane Philharmonic Orchestra (BPO) is a community orchestra based in Brisbane, Australia, which performs a wide variety of orchestral works.

The BPO performs several concerts each year at venues including the Brisbane City Hall, and the Old Museum Building, Brisbane. The orchestra also tours regionally throughout Queensland on occasion.

Entry to the BPO is by audition and it is the only community orchestra within the city that rotates guest conductors by invitation rather than establishing a permanent music director. The organisation is administered by an executive committee elected by the members each year. The members are involved voluntarily in all facets of the organisation such as concert production, marketing and promotion, auditions, and social events.

== History ==
The orchestra was formed in 1999 with only 18 musicians. In 2000, the orchestra changed its name to the Brisbane Philharmonic Orchestra. The BPO started presenting annual subscription seasons from 2001.

In 2005, the orchestra received an honourable recognition at the National Orchestral Awards, the first Queensland community orchestra to have received such a mention. The orchestra presented its 20th annual subscription season in 2020.

In addition to performing in its own right, the orchestra has also appeared in many popular music festivals. In May 2021, the ensemble performed with the Synthony touring show at the Brisbane Riverstage. The orchestra has regularly participated in the Queensland Music Festival, and is a long-standing contributor to the 4MBS Festival of Classics.

In April 2022, the ensemble presented the premiere performance in Queensland of Shostakovich's Fourth Symphony.

In May 2025, the orchestra performed with the Icelandic post-rock band, Sigur Rós, during their Australian tour.

=== Conductors ===
- Susan Collins
- Werner Andreas Albert
- John Curro AM MBE
- Philip Davis
- Sean O'Boyle
- Paul Dean
- Nicholas Cleobury
- Emily Cox
- Chen Yang
- Simon Hewett
- Peter Luff
- Stefanie Smith
- Leo McFadden
- Nathan Aspinall
- Sergei Korschmin
- David Law
- Michael Keen
- Steven Moore
- Michael Keen
- Russell Gray

=== Musicians ===
- Sigur Rós (band)
- Brisbane Chorale
- Canticum Chamber Choir
- William Barton (didgeridoo)
- James Cuddeford (violin)
- Deborah Humble (mezzo-soprano)
- Rosario La Spina (tenor)
- Sara Macliver (soprano)
- Katie Noonan (singer-songwriter)
- Markus Stocker (cello)
- Melinda Stocker (violin)
- Russell Powell (cello)
- Karin Schaupp (guitar)
- Malcolm Stewart (horn)
- Alex Raineri (piano)
- John Coulton (trumpet)
- Jeremy Stafford (guitar)
- Oscar Wong (piano)
- Rebecca Cassidy (soprano)
- Vivienne Collier-Vickers (horn)
- Lauren Manuel (horn)
- Oliver Boyd (baritone)
- Anna Stephens (soprano)
- Annika Hinrichs (soprano)
- Jonathan Henderson (flute)
- Shaun Brown (baritone)
- Levi Hansen (piano)
- Tijana Kozarčić (harp)
- Rosa Guitar Trio (guitars)
- David Wakeham (baritone)
- Henry Choo (baritone)
- Natalie Christer Peluso (soprano)
- Brijette Tubb (flute)

=== Other artists ===
- Tama Matheson (actor)
- Barry Otto (actor)

== See also ==
- Culture of Brisbane
