= Milijana Nikolic =

Operatic mezzo-soprano

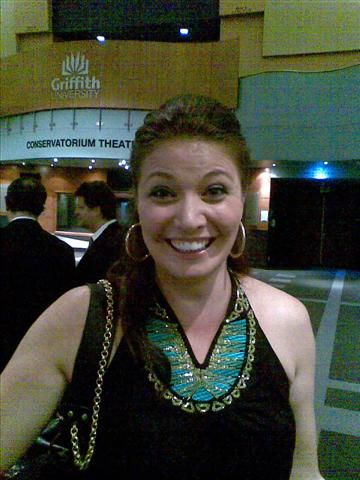
Milijana Nikolic, 2010 at the Queensland Conservatorium

Milijana Nikolic (or Nikolić; Serbian Cyrillic: Милијана Николић; born 1975) is an operatic mezzo-soprano.

== Education ==
Nikolic was born in Sremska Mitrovica (Note: Sremska Mitrovica was then in the Socialist Federal Republic of Yugoslavia, today it is in Serbia.) where she began singing in the choir Sirmium Cantorum. She graduated in 2001 from the University of Arts in Belgrade, tutored by Prof. Radmila Smiljanić.

== Career ==
Her stage debut was at the National Theatre in Belgrade as Third Lady in Mozart's The Magic Flute; she then sang Tisbe in Rossini's La Cenerentola.

In 2001, Nikolic won a two-year scholarship for the Teatro alla Scala Academy for Solists. At the academy, sang the Third Greek Lady in Gluck's Iphigénie en Aulide conducted by Riccardo Muti at the Teatro degli Arcimboldi, Milan, Emma in Donizetti's Ugo, conte di Parigi, a role she had sung before at the Teatro Donizetti in Bergamo and later sang again at the Teatro Massimo Bellini in Catania. At La Scala, she sang the principal role of Cuniza in Verdi's Oberto, a production where her later husband Rosario La Spina sang Riccardo; this production then travelled to the Teatro Carlo Felice in Genoa.

In 2006, Nikolic sang the role of Eboli in Verdi's Don Carlos in Seoul, Korea, and later reprised this role in 2008 for Opera Hong Kong. Other roles include Maddalena in Verdi's Rigoletto, Marchesa di Berkenfeld in Donizetti's La Figlia di Reggimento in 2004 at the Teatro Marrucino, Chieti, which has been released on CD for Naxos Records. In 2006, Nikolic sang La Baronne in Massenet's Chérubin and Fenena in Verdi's Nabucco for the Teatro Lirico in Cagliari, Sardinia.

Her collaboration with Opera Australia began in 2006, singing Ježibaba in Dvořák's Rusalka and continued with performances as the Princess in Puccini's Suor Angelica, Azucena in Verdi's Il trovatore and Venus in Richard Wagner's Tannhäuser. Other roles for Opera Australia were in 2008 Ulrica in Verdi's Un ballo in maschera and Adelaide in Richard Strauss' Arabella. In March 2010, Nikolic created the role of Mrs Dalton in the world premiere of Brett Dean's opera Bliss and she travelled in 2011 with that production to the Edinburgh Festival. Nikolic sang Amneris in Verdi's Aida for Opera Australia in 2009 and in 2010 for Southern Opera, Christchurch, New Zealand, and for Opera Queensland. In July 2010, she sang the title role in Bizet's Carmen at the Savonlinna Opera Festival in Finland. She also sang the title role in Vivaldi's opera Juditha triumphans at the 2010 Sferisterio Opera Festival.

In 2013, she alternated in the title role of Carmen with Rinat Shaham in Opera Australia's "Handa Opera on Sydney Harbour" production. She sang Amneris in Michigan Opera's production of Aida, opposite her husband as Radames. In 2015, Nikolic sang Giovanna at the Metropolitan Opera, New York, in Donizetti's Anna Bolena.

Nikolic' concert appearances have included a gala at La Scala and Rossini's Petite messe solennelle in Sardinia; she has performed in Mozart's Requiem, Handel's Messiah, and Verdi's Missa da Requiem with The Queensland Orchestra and the latter with the Adelaide Symphony Orchestra. She also appeared as soloist with the Auckland Philharmonia. In September 2008 she sang in Mendelssohn's oratorio Paulus.

In November 2012 Nikolic and La Spina had a son.

== Awards ==
Nikolic has won awards at international competitions, including the Biserka Cvejić Award as "most outstanding vocalist of the year 1998", the Nikola Cvejic Award as "most promising young singer" in the Petar Konjović International Competition 1998. In 2001 she won first prize in the Ada Sari International Competition in Kraków.

== Recordings ==
- 2002: Third Greek Lady in Iphigénie en Aulide by Christoph Willibald Gluck
- 2003: Emma in Ugo, conte di Parigi by Gaetano Donizetti
- 2006: La Marchesa di Berkenfeld in La figlia del reggimento by Gaetano Donizetti
