= Jack Liebeck =

British-German classical violinist

Jack Liebeck (born 4 August 1980) is a British–German violinist. In 2010, he won a Classical Brit in the young British classical performer category. He was soloist on the score for the 2011 film Jane Eyre, directed by Cary Joji Fukunaga and also on the Oscar, Golden Globe and BAFTA nominated soundtrack for Anna Karenina (2012). Both scores were composed by Dario Marianelli. He records exclusively for Hyperion Records.

== Career ==
Liebeck was born in London. Liebeck's playing embraces the worlds of chamber music by Mozart through to contemporary works like Brett Dean's 2008 violin concerto The Lost Art of Letter Writing. Liebeck's fascination with all things scientific has included performing the world premiere of Dario Marianelli's Voyager violin concerto and collaborations with Professor Brian Cox; Liebeck programmes his own annual festival, Oxford May Music, around the themes of music, science and the arts. A professional photographer, he loves film and can be heard in the soundtracks of The Theory of Everything, Jane Eyre and Anna Karenina. Liebeck is a dedicated educator holding a professorship at the Royal Academy of Music. He is also a member of Trio Dali.

As soloist and chamber musician, Liebeck has performed with all the major British orchestras under conductors such as Andrew Litton, Leonard Slatkin, Karl-Heinz Steffens, Sir Mark Elder, and further afield with the Royal Stockholm Philharmonic Orchestra (under Sakari Oramo), Swedish Radio Symphony Orchestra (Daniel Harding), Oslo Philharmonic (Jukka-Pekka Saraste), Belgian National Orchestra, Polish Radio Symphony, Queensland Symphony Orchestra, Moscow State Symphony Orchestra, St. Louis Symphony Orchestra (David Robertson), Indianapolis Symphony Orchestra (Douglas Boyd), and Melbourne Symphony Orchestra (Jakub Hrůša) among many others.

Collaborators throughout his career include artists such as Renaud Capuçon and Gautier Capuçon, Angela Hewitt, Jean-Yves Thibaudet, Piers Lane, Julius Drake, Bengt Forsberg, Michael Collins and Katya Apekisheva.

Liebeck released his debut album, Works for Violin & Piano, with Katya Apekisheva in 2002 on Quartz to critical acclaim (Telegraph CD of the Week and nominated for a Classical Brit Award). His next two recordings were for Sony Classics. Dvorak won Liebeck the 2010 Classical Brit Award – Young Artist of the Year.

In 2014, Liebeck began his recording relationship with Hyperion Records with releases of Kreisler Violin Music with pianist Katya Apekisheva. His Bruch concerto series with the BBC Scottish Symphony Orchestra and Martyn Brabbins has received wide critical acclaim, his last in the series, Violin Concerto No. 2, was released in early 2017.

Liebeck plays the 'Ex-Wilhelmj' J. B. Guadagnini dated 1785 and is loaned a Joseph Henry bow by Kathron Sturrock in the memory of her deceased husband, Professor David Bennett.

In 2022, Liebeck became the new artistic director of the Australian Festival of Chamber Music.

On 14 November 2022, it was announced by Ashley Wass that Liebeck would be the external assessor for the 2022–2023 Yehudi Menuhin School internal student assessments.
