= Alex James =

Alex James may refer to:

- Alex James (musician) (born 1968), bassist in English band Blur, newspaper columnist and cheesemaker
- Alex James (songwriter) (born 1976), songwriter, producer and music publisher
- Alex James (footballer) (1901–1953), Scottish footballer with Arsenal F.C.
- Alec James (cricketer) (1889–1961), Welsh cricketer
- Alex James (mathematician), British and New Zealand mathematician and mathematical biologist
- Alex James (professor), scientist and researcher
- Alex James (boxer), boxer from Grenada; see Boxing at the 1990 Central American and Caribbean Games
