= Ahmat (surname) =

Family name

Ahmat is a Chadian surname. Notable people with the surname include:

- Adji Ahmat, Chadian football player
- Jim Ahmat (born 1983), Australian rugby league player
- Linda Ahmat (born 1952), Papua New Guinea lawn bowler
- Matthew Ahmat (born 1974), Australian rules footballer
- Robert Ahmat (born 1977), Australian rules footballer
- Vanessa Lee-AhMat (born 1971), Australian scholar
