= Alexander James =

Alexander James may refer to:

- Alexander James (wrestler), American professional wrestler
- Alex James (footballer), Scottish footballer
- Alex James (songwriter), British songwriter and record producer

== See also ==
- Alex James (disambiguation)
