= Limelight Awards =

The Limelight Awards were an annual celebration of the performances, recordings and music personalities in Australian classical music. Sponsored by the monthly classical arts magazine Limelight, they were the only publicly voted awards of their kind in Australia. In 2012 the awards attracted more than 4,500 votes.

The Limelight Award winners were voted on from a shortlist of entries selected by an expert panel of Limelight critics and ABC Classic FM staff over ten categories. These categories included Music Personality of the Year, Best Newcomer and Best Orchestral, Chamber and Solo performances. From this shortlist the public were then invited to select and vote for their favourite musicians. The Limelight Awards were unique, being the only classical music awards in Australia where the public are invited to help recognise well-loved musicians.

== Award winners ==
2007

- Music Personality of the year: Jonathon Welch (choirmaster, The Choir of Hard Knocks)
- Best Classical Crossover Artist: Il Divo
- Best Orchestral Concert: Piers Lane (piano) with the Queensland Orchestra/Pietari Inkinen, Beethoven Piano Concerto No. 5 ‘Emperor’
- Best Chamber music concert: Australian Chamber Orchestra/Patricia Kopatchinskaja: Hope
- Best Solo performance: Håkan Hardenberger, trumpet
- Best World music achievement: Geoffrey Gurrumul Yunupingu
- Best Classical recording: Sara Macliver/Tasmanian Symphony Orchestra/Sebastian Lang-Lessing, Mozart: Arias (ABC Classics)
- Best World Music Achievement: Joseph Tawadros & James Tawadros, Ben Rogers, Epiphany
- Best Jazz achievement: Phil Slater Quartet; The Thousands
- Best New Composition: Kaidan by Ian Cleworth, Timothy Constable Riley Lee and members of TaikOz
- Best Event/festival: Adelaide Symphony Orchestra, Sibelius Festival
- Best Newcomer: Benjamin Northey (conductor)

2008

- Music Personality of the year: Richard Tognetti
- Best Classical Crossover Artist: Il Divo
- Best Orchestral Concert: Sydney Symphony/David Robertson, Stravinsky: The Firebird
- Best Chamber music concert: Australian Brandenburg Orchestra with Andreas Scholl
- Best Solo performance: Nigel Kennedy violin concertos by Mozart and Beethoven
- Best World music achievement: Geoffrey Gurrumul Yunupingu
- Best Classical recording: Slava Grigoryan and Leonard Grigoryan, Baroque Guitar Concertos (ABC Classics)
- Best Jazz achievement: Don Burrows
- Best Event/festival: Sydney International Piano Competition of Australia
- Best Newcomer: Geoffrey Gurrumul Yunupingu

2009

- Limelight Readers' Choice: Richard Tognetti
- Music Personality of the year: Geoffrey Gurrumul Yunupingu
- Best Orchestral Concert: Sydney Symphony Orchestra/Vladimir Ashkenazy, Elgar: The Dream of Gerontius
- Best Opera Production: Bliss (Opera Australia)
- Best Chamber Music Concert: Australian Chamber Orchestra, Schoenberg: Transfigured Night
- Best Performance in an Opera: Teddy Tahu Rhodes, Figaro in The Marriage of Figaro
- Best Solo Performance: James Ehnes with Sydney Symphony Orchestra
- Best World Music Achievement: Dan Sultan, WOMADelaide
- Best Classical Recording: Goldner String Quartet, Beethoven the complete string quartets
- Best Jazz Recording: Tom O’Halloran Trio, We Happy Few
- Best Event/Festival: Australian Festival of Chamber Music
- Best New Composition: Carl Vine Symphony No. 7
- Best Newcomer: Hamer String Quartet

2010

- Limelight Readers’ Choice: Emma Matthews (soprano)
- Music Personality of the year: Richard Tognetti
- Best Orchestral Concert: Australian Chamber Orchestra/Richard Tognetti, Schumann: Cello Concerto; Beethoven: Symphony No. 5; Pēteris Vasks: Vox Amoris; Mozart: Symphony No. 41 'Jupiter'
- Best Opera Production: Bliss (Opera Australia)
- Best Chamber Music Concert: Australian Chamber Orchestra and Patricia Kopatchinskaja, The Barefoot Fiddler
- Best Performance in an Opera: Teddy Tahu Rhodes, Figaro in The Marriage of Figaro
- Best Solo Performance: Paul Lewis (piano) Musica Viva
- Best World Music Recording: Band of Brothers
- Best Classical Recording: Handel: Concerti grossi Op. 6, Australian Brandenburg Orchestra/Paul Dyer (ABC Classics)
- Best Jazz Recording: James Oehlers and Paul Grabowsky, On a Clear Day (Head Records)
- Best Event/Festival: Musica Viva Festival
- Best New Composition: Bliss Brett Dean
- Best Newcomer: Zubin Kanga (piano)

2011

- Music Personality of the year: Vladimir Ashkenazy
- Best Orchestral Concert: Simone Young
- Best Opera Production: Der Rosenkavalier, Opera Australia
- Best Chamber Music Concert: Synergy Percussion: Iannis Xenakis, Pléïades
- Best Performance in an Opera: Teddy Tahu Rhodes, Figaro in The Marriage of Figaro
- Best Solo Performance: Fiona Campbell
- Best World Music Recording: Band of Brothers
- Best Classical Recording: Mozart Violin Concertos Vol. 2, Australian Chamber Orchestra/Richard Tognetti (BIS)
- Best Jazz Recording: The Idea of North, Extraordinary Tale (ABC Classics)
- Best Event/Festival: Musica Viva Festival
- Best New Composition: Nigel Westlake, Missa Solis: Requiem for Eli
- Best Newcomer: Zane Banks

2012

- Music Personality of the Year: Simone Young, conductor
- Best Orchestral Concert: Australian Chamber Orchestra, Beethoven: Symphony No. 9, Calm Sea and Prosperous Voyage; Brahms: Geistliches Lied; Messiaen: Prayer of Christ ascending towards his Father
- Best Chamber Music Concert: Australian String Quartet/Brett Dean, Legacy
- Best Solo Performance: Anne-Sophie Mutter, Beethoven Violin Concerto
- Best Opera Production: La traviata, Opera Australia
- Best Performance in an Opera: Emma Matthews, Violetta in La traviata
- Best Classical Recording: Sydney Symphony Orchestra / Vladimir Ashkenazy, SSO Live 2012
- Best New Composition: Elena Kats-Chernin, Symphonia Eluvium
- Best Event/Festival: Australian Festival of Chamber Music
- Best Newcomer: Emily Sun, violinist
