= Vlasenko =

Vlasenko (also spelled Vlassenko; Vlasenco; Ukrainian: Власенко; Russian: Власенко) is a common Ukrainian and Russian surname. The name may refer to several people:

- Aleksey Mitrofanovich Vlasenko (1906–1950), Soviet general
- Ilya Arkhipovich Vlasenko (1902-1963), Hero of the Soviet Union (1943)
- Lev Vlassenko (1928—1996), Russian pianist and teacher
- Natasha Vlassenko (born 1956), Russian-Australian pianist and teacher
- Maryna Vlasenko (born 1987), Ukrainian handballer
- Serhiy Vlasenko (born 1967), Ukrainian lawyer and politician
- Vladyslav Vlasenko (born 1990), Ukrainian footballer
