= Emily Cox (conductor) =

Australian conductor

Catherine (Emily) Cox AM is an Australian conductor and music director of choirs.

== Education ==
Emily Cox graduated from the Dartmouth College (USA) and the Queensland Conservatorium of Music in Brisbane and continued her education overseas, most notably with Swedish conductor Eric Ericson.

== Career ==
Since January 2003, she has worked as music director of the Brisbane Chorale. She is also music director of Canticum Chamber Choir, and conductor of the Conservatorium Chamber Choir at the Queensland Conservatorium of Music. She is a lecturer in choral studies at the Queensland Conservatorium Griffith University.

Cox works nationally as a festival and workshop director, adjudicator and choral educator. She performs as a conductor and chorus master at leading Australian performing arts centres such as the Queensland Performing Arts Centre and major arts festivals.

Cox was appointed a Member of the Order of Australia in the 2020 Australia Day Honours for her service to choral music.

She is married to organist Christopher Wrench.
