= Ada Elizabeth Corder =

Australian music teacher and pianist

Ada Elizabeth Corder MBE
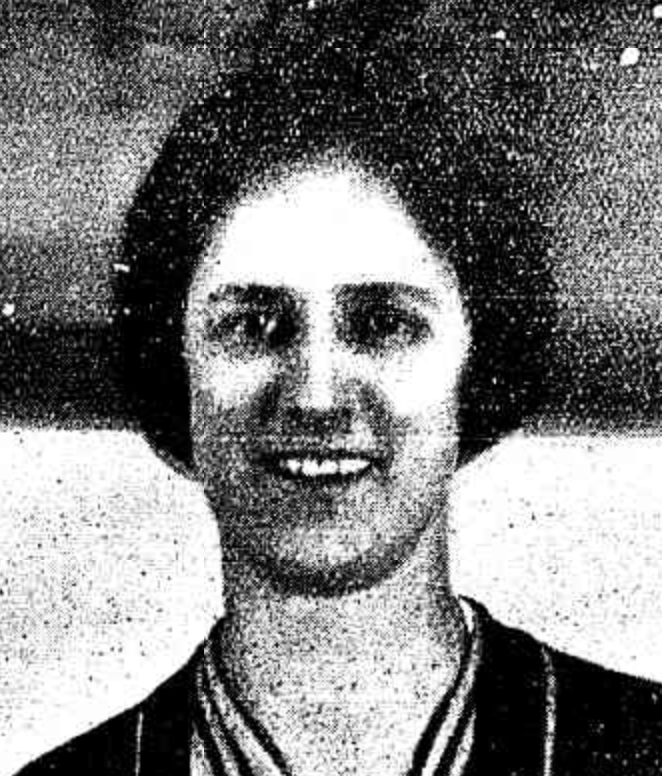
- Corder in 1930
- Born: Ada Elizabeth Freeman; 20 March 1895; Ararat, Victoria, Australia
- Died: 27 September 1987 (aged 92); Camberwell, Victoria, Australia
- Education: University of Melbourne
- Occupations: Pianist, music teacher

Ada Elizabeth Corder (20 March 1895 – 27 September 1987) was an Australian music teacher and pianist. Best known of her pupils was Nancy Weir. She performed and taught as Ada Freeman before her marriage in 1937.

== Early life and education ==
Corder was born at Ararat, Victoria on 20 March 1895, daughter of Ada (née Byrne) and railway employee James Charles Freeman. She learned piano from Mother Mary Agnes during her schooling at the Faithful Companions of Jesus convent in Richmond, where soprano Stella Power was also a pupil. At the 1909 Australian Natives Association (ANA) Musical Competitions, she won the champion under 14 for piano solo. She gained honours in her Grade III piano examination in 1910. After a concert with tenor Walter Kirby in 1911, Punch described her as "though quite a child, we have a pianist of much maturity of thought and execution". She won grand champion instrumentalist at the 1912 ANA Musical Competitions.

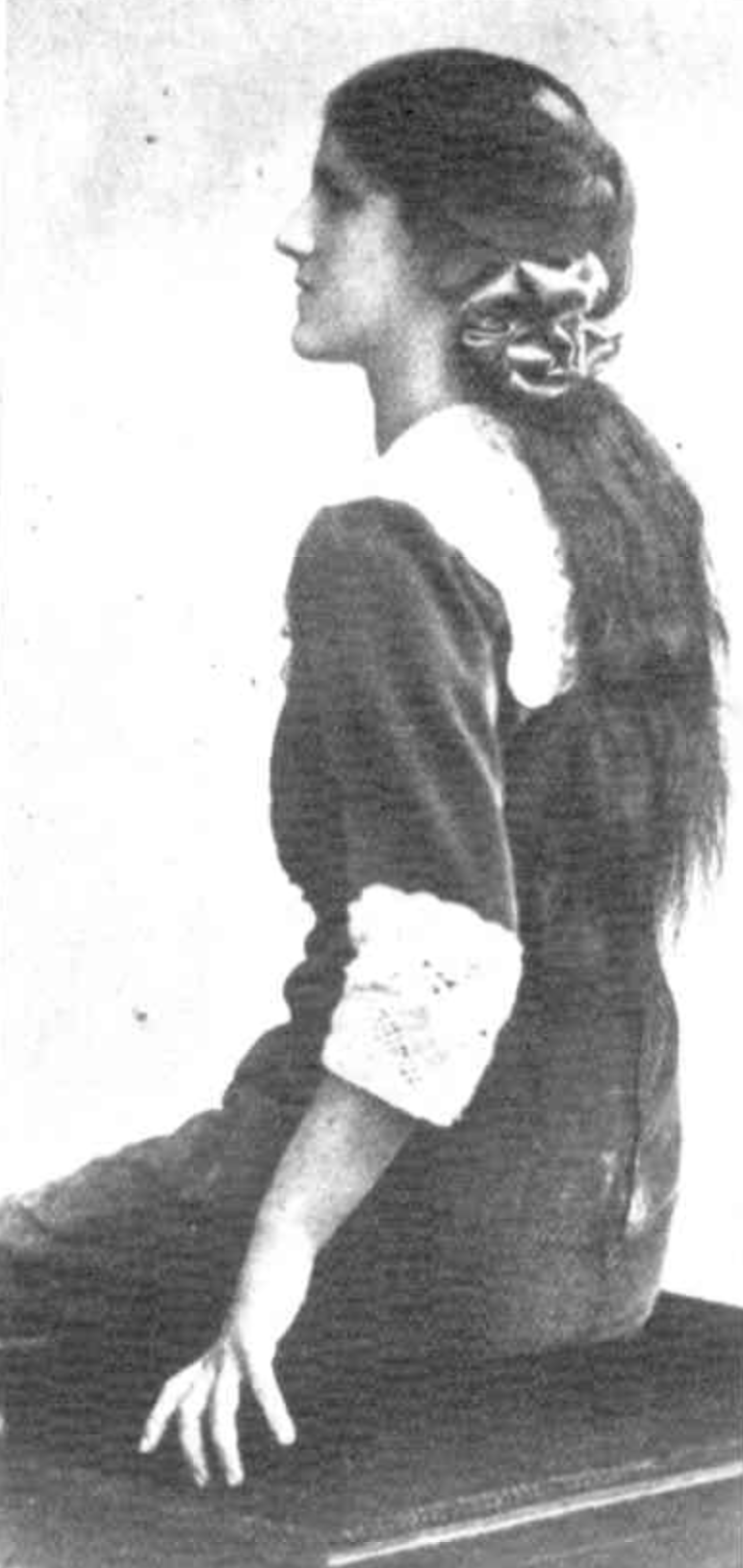
Corder in 1913

With licentiate qualifications from the LCM, she enrolled in the Melbourne Conservatorium of Music in 1913, where she was taught piano by Edward Goll. She was awarded the Ormond exhibition each year for achieving the highest marks and graduated in 1917 with a Bachelor of Music (honours).

== Career ==
Corder began teaching pianoforte before her graduation. She gave frequent concerts as a soloist and accompanist. She first performed with the Melbourne Symphony Orchestra in 1918.

She was sought after as a piano teacher and nurtured the careers of students such as Esther Rofe, Geoffrey Saba and Nancy Weir. She accompanied the latter to Berlin in 1930 where both student and teacher took lessons from Artur Schnabel. Years later she and Weir established the Australian Musicians Overseas Scholarship.

== Honours and recognition ==
Corder was awarded honorary life membership of the Victorian Music Teachers Association. She was appointed a Member of the Order of the British Empire in the 1975 New Year Honours for service to music.

== Personal and death ==
Corder married Henry Corder (died 1965) in 1937. She died at Camberwell on 27 September 1987.
