= William Lovelock =

English classical composer and pedagogue

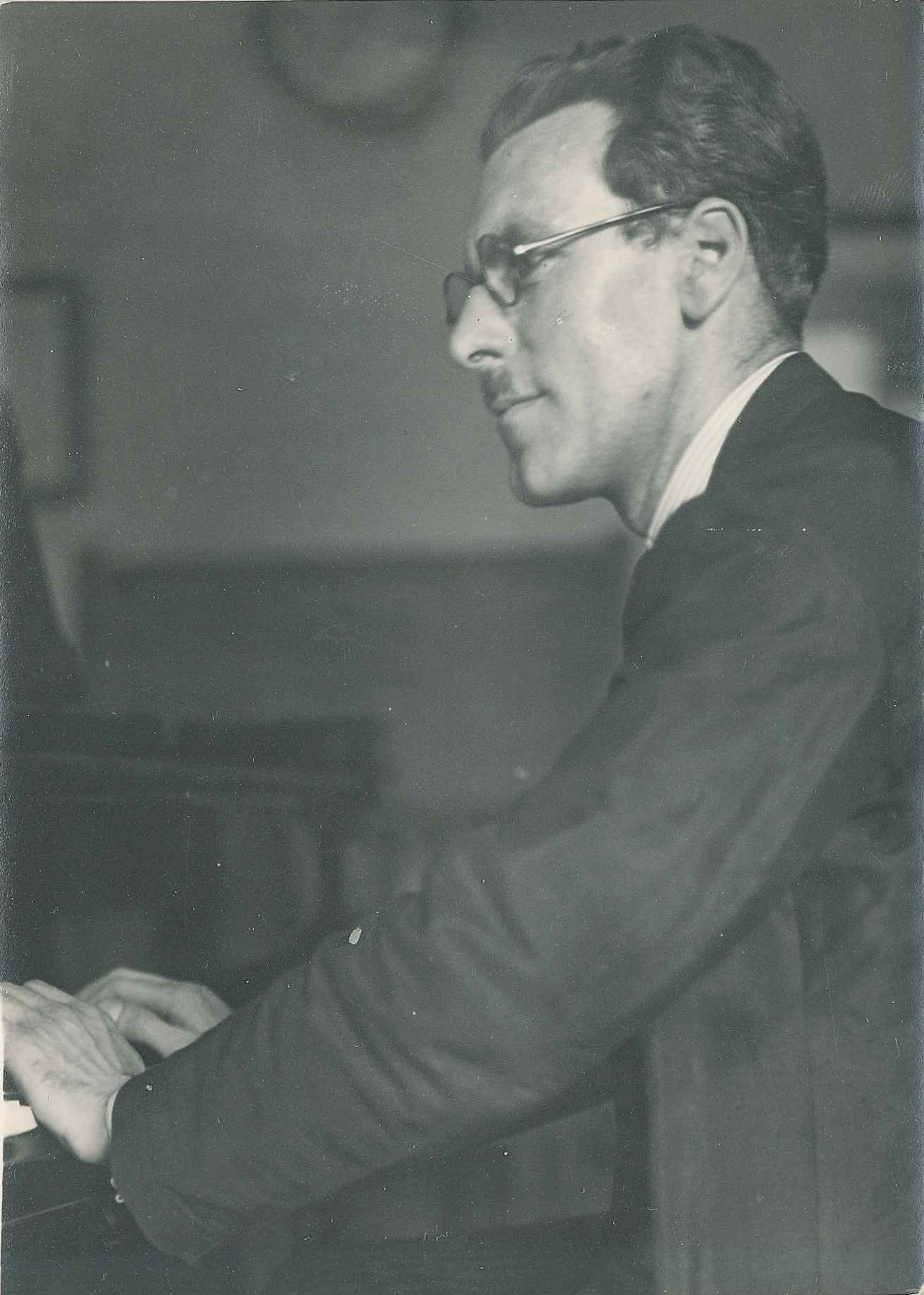
William Lovelock at the Trinity College of Music in the 1930s

William Lovelock (13 March 1899 – 26 June 1986) was an English classical composer and pedagogue who spent many years in Australia. He was the first Director of the Queensland Conservatorium of Music in Brisbane, and later became the chief music critic for The Courier-Mail newspaper while developing an independent career as a composer.

== Career ==
Though William Lovelock was born in London, his family were originally of Berkshire extraction and two of his great-uncles had emigrated to Australia in the 19th century, long before he did. He was educated at Emanuel School, Wandsworth, and started piano lessons at the age of six and organ lessons at twelve. At the age of sixteen, he won an organ scholarship to the Trinity College of Music, where he studied with C. W. Pearce and Henry Geehl. After service as an artilleryman in World War I, he returned to Trinity College and graduated with a Bachelor of Music degree in 1922. He then joined the teaching staff and later obtained a doctorate in composition in 1932. As an organist, he served at St. Clements in Eastcheap from 1919 to 1923, then as Kapellmeister to Countess Cowdray from 1923 to 1926. He was also organist at the Church of the Good Shepherd in Carshalton from 1928 to 1930.

During the 1930s Lovelock wrote the first of his numerous popular textbooks for college music students. Later, as a roving examiner for the College, he spent a six-year stint in Asia, ending up in the Indian Army Ordnance Corps during the Second World War and reaching the rank of major in 1942. While stationed in Varanasi in 1945 he sketched the beginning of a concerto for piano, the first of the many concertos to come.

On his return to London in 1946, Lovelock rejoined the faculty at Trinity College and eventually became Dean of the Faculty of Music at the University of London in 1954. In 1956, he was appointed as the first Director of the Queensland Conservatorium of Music in Brisbane, Australia, but left in 1959 after disagreement over his teaching methods. However, he chose to stay on since, for the first time, he found that he had the time and freedom to compose seriously. Meanwhile, he supported himself as a free-lance teacher, adjudicator, and as chief music critic for The Courier-Mail in Brisbane.

Lovelock was interviewed in Hazel de Berg in 1980 about his life and career. The recording can be found at the National Library of Australia.

In 1926, he had married Winifred Irene Littlejohn, by whom he had a son, Gregory (1931). After the death of his wife in 1981, Lovelock returned to England. He died in 1986 in Shipston-on-Stour, Warwickshire.

== Work ==
Lovelock's career as a composer was overshadowed by his teaching duties. Among his earlier successes was the student work Autumn Moods ("poem for full orchestra") which was praised by Musical News and Herald when it was performed in 1922, and his Second suite for orchestra broadcast by the BBC in 1937.

But it was during his residence in Australia that Lovelock wrote and had performed the bulk of his musical compositions, which range from large orchestral, choral and band works to teaching pieces for children, as well as 14 concertos. Some of his works were intended especially for Australian performers, such as his Trumpet Concerto (1968) for John Robertson (1913-76), then principal trumpetist of the Sydney Symphony Orchestra, which remains his most performed piece. A number of others filled gaps in the repertoire of certain instruments, such as tuba, double bass, and xylophone. There is a modern recording of his Sonata for alto-saxophone and piano (1974). Only occasionally a demanding composer, Lovelock considered himself a romantic and believed that "one of the most important functions of music is to provide entertainment rather than coldblooded intellectual abstractions."

Because his major music was written there, Lovelock is considered an Australian composer, although he himself commented: "I prefer to feel that I am an English composer who happens to live in Brisbane." Of his many textbooks on musical theory, history and composition, some still continue in use even beyond the English-speaking world.

== Selected works ==
Orchestral

- An English Suite (dedicated to the Bombay Symphony Orchestra, 1957)
- Sinfonietta (1964)
- Divertimento for string orchestra (1965)
- Hyde Park Shuffle (commissioned by the ABC, 1973)
- Festive Overture (1975)
- Overture for a Cheerful Occasion: for full orchestra (1979)

Concertante

- Horn concerto
- Concerto for viola and orchestra (1960)
- Concerto for flute and orchestra (1961)
- Concerto for piano and orchestra (1963)
- Concerto for saxophone and orchestra No. 1 (1963)
- Concertino for trombone and string orchestra (1965)
- Symphony in C sharp minor (1966)
- Concerto for bass tuba and orchestra (1967)
- Symphony for trumpet and orchestra (dedicated to Sir Bernard Heinze, 1968)
- Sinfonia concertante for organ and orchestra (1968)
- Saxophone Concerto No. 2 (1973)
- Raggy Rhapsody for piano and orchestra (1976)
- Rhapsody Concerto for harp and orchestra (1981)

Chamber music

- Miniature Suite for Brass Quintet (1967)
- Suite for Brass Quintet (1969)
- Brass Quintet #3 (1975)

Instrumental

- Sketches for clarinet and piano (1928)
- Sonata for alto-saxophone and piano (1974)

Solo instruments

- Introduction and fugue for organ (1957)
- Cadenza for flute (1968)
- Autumn Winds (for piano)

Choral

- The Counterparts, a poem by Ernest Briggs (1905-67) set for mixed choir and piano (1958)
- Motet for Communion, for mixed choir and organ (1972)

== Bibliography ==
- Michael Wade Lichnovsky, Australian sonatas for alto saxophone and piano: New editions and performance guides for three works by major Australian composers, The University of Iowa Ann Arbor MI, 2008 Ch 2, pp. 26–49
- Logan Place, An analysis and performance guide to William Lovelock's concerto for trumpet and orchestra, University of North Texas, 2008
- Stephen Pleskun, A Chronological History of Australian Composers and Their Compositions Vol. 2, Xlibris 2012
