= Toby Wren =

Australian jazz composer and performer

Toby Wren is an Australian jazz composer and performer. He performs in the Toby Wren Trio/Quartet, the Carnatic Jazz Experiment, which incorporates Indian music. He led the sextet 'Finders Keepers'.

== Education ==
Wren graduated from the Queensland Conservatorium in 1998.

== Career ==
He was selected for the Australian Composers Orchestral Forum twice, and has been a Composer Affiliate of The Queensland Orchestra. In 1997, he won the DIGF composition prize for his guitar piece "Nebbish". He was a finalist in the APRA Music Awards in 2011, in a jazz category. In 2006 and 2008, Wren travelled to India to learn about Carnatic music. He has written arrangements for George, Rhubarb and Chris Pickering. He has also collaborated with other artists, including saxophonist Rafael Karlen.

== Discography ==
- Fat Lip 81 (with Babel) - 2001
- Umlaut - 2006
- Everything Must Go - 2008
- Black Mountain - 2017
