= Nancy Weir =

Australian pianist and music teacher

Nancy Weir AO
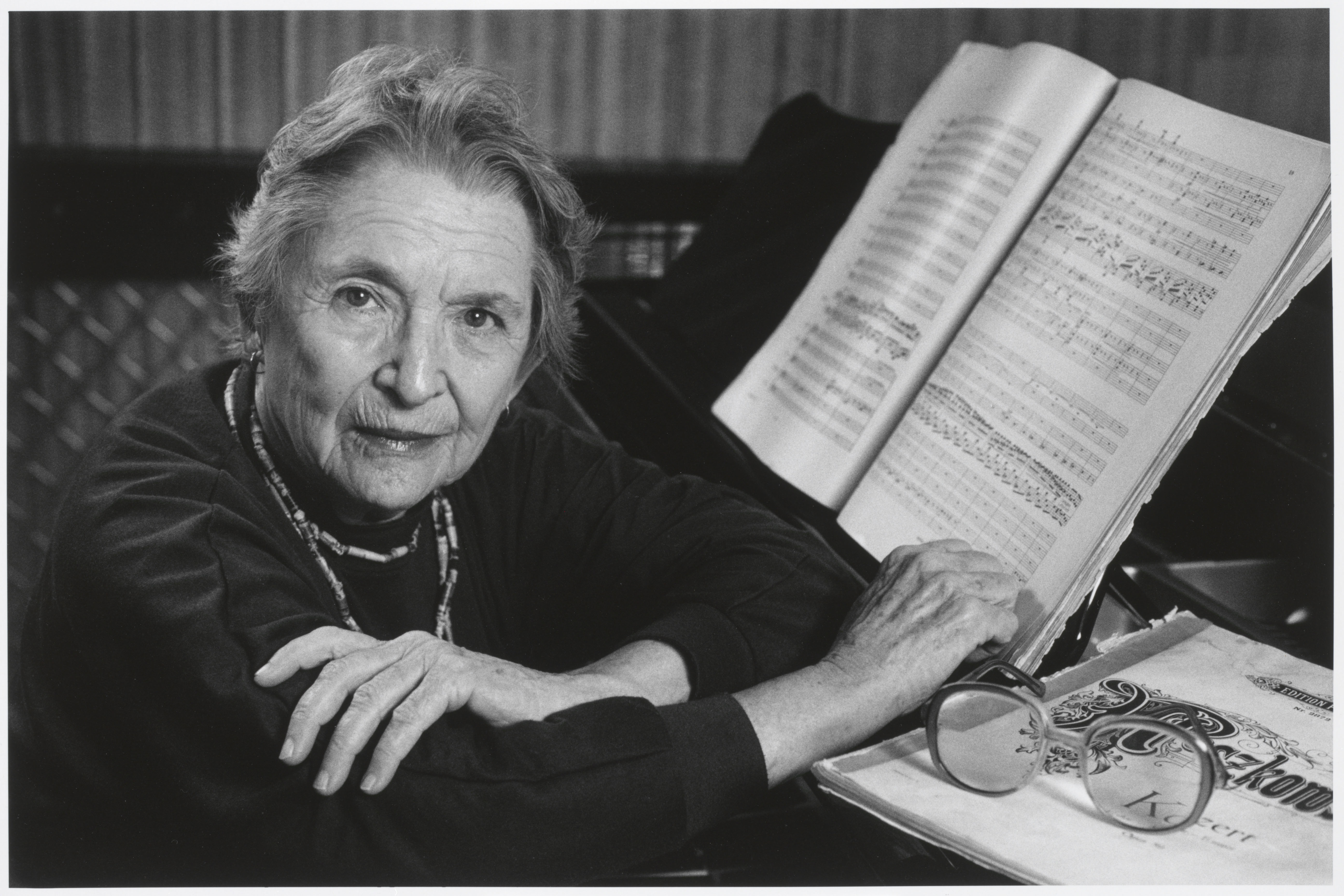

Background information
- Born: 13 July 1915; Kew, Melbourne, Australia
- Died: 14 October 2008 (aged 93) New Farm, Brisbane
- Genre: Classical
- Instrument: Piano

Nancy Mary Weir AO (13 July 1915 – 14 October 2008) was an Australian pianist and teacher.

== Biography ==
Weir was born in Kew, Melbourne, on 13 July 1915. Her father was a publican who ran a small hotel in Lockhart, near Wagga Wagga, and she grew up "behind the bar".

She studied piano in Melbourne with Edward Goll (a pupil of Emil von Sauer and grand-pupil of Franz Liszt) and Ada Corder (Freeman). She was renowned as a child prodigy, performing to great acclaim. A review of her concert performance in December 1929 noted,

With all her latent power, and natural gift for artistic expression, Nancy played Schumann's Scenes from Childhood, the work in which she exhibited her rare talent at the Town Hall some time ago. The unaffected simplicity of the child's playing, coupled with a sure grasp of the expressive and pictorial possibilities of the Scenes, constituted the charm of her renditions; The audience expressed the highest pleasure in Nancy Weir's clever playing and phenomenal success.

At age 13, she performed Beethoven's Piano Concerto No. 3, with the Melbourne Symphony Orchestra, under the English-born conductor Fritz Hart. Following this concert, the Lord Mayor of Melbourne set up a public subscription scheme for the young Weir to study with a great teacher in Europe. On arrival in Berlin, Germany, in 1930, she studied first with Edwin Fischer, but wangled her own way to studying with the legendary Artur Schnabel who she said was more fashionable. However, the "official" story is that Schnabel heard her and agreed to take her on as a student immediately. After the Nazis came to power, Schnabel left Germany in 1933, and so did Weir.

She moved to London, where she studied at the Royal Academy of Music with Harold Craxton from 1933 until 1936. She herself became the subject of several legends. One of these involved her being set to learn, by Craxton, the Bach-Busoni Chaconne in D minor. She arrived for her lesson the next week and played the work from memory. Craxton and others were astonished. She later explained that, as a student in Berlin, she had a fellow pianist neighbour who played a certain work that she did not know, for several hours every day. She learned this work by musical osmosis through the walls, and it turned out to be the Chaconne, which, until Craxton gave the music to her, she had never before seen. The work became a great financial asset for her, as she could guarantee certain competition prize monies by playing it, frequently having spent the money before she luckily, and predictably, won.

Another legend centres on her phenomenal musical ear. She could hear as many as five independent musical lines simultaneously. Most professional musicians have difficulty with three. She was described in London in the 1930s as having "the best musical ear since Mozart".

She established a career as a performer In London during the period from 1936 until 1954, making her Proms debut with the Bach Concerto in A minor for 4 pianos, conducted by Sir Henry Wood. After graduation from the Royal Academy, she also joined the Bangor Trio at the University College of North Wales.

The Second World War interrupted what promised to be a very successful career. She signed up in the Women's Auxiliary Air Force (WAAF). Her knowledge of German caused her to be transferred from the WAAF to RAF Intelligence. She eventually became what she later described as, after the 50 years exclusion period for sensitive Second World War information had expired in 1995, "a musical spy". Her wartime duties as an intelligence officer included "sitting on a hilltop in Kent listening to the chatter of young German pilots – they were as young and foolish as we were. I think I prevented a few bomb attacks." She eventually attained the rank of Flight Officer.

However, word of her musical status leaked out. She was sent to Egypt and the then Palestine to entertain the troops, accompanying such artists as Paul Robeson and Beniamino Gigli. But her ever-vigilant ear was at all times listening. At the end of the war she was in Morocco and was told that she was to be flown to Rome, to attend the German language interrogations of POWs. In her description of the event her unique sense of humour shines forth: "I was to fly into Rome, but the Allies had destroyed the airfield, so I had to parachute in. I think I am the only classical pianist in history who ever parachuted into Rome."

After the war she returned to performing in England, and she continued touring, making many appearances with famous conductors, including Willem van Otterloo, Alceo Galliera, Eugene Goossens, Arthur Fiedler and Nicolai Malko. But, again in her own words "things had gone cold by then, and it was difficult to re-start the career". When her father suffered a bout of ill-health in 1954 she returned to Melbourne to care for him, her mother having died earlier.

Her musical performances were characterised by great sensitivity and musicality and she was one of the best known Australian musical performers in the 1950s and 60s. Reviews of her performances included glowing references to "artistic integrity and musical sensibility of a high order", "fine technique and of fine interpretations" and "gradation of tone obtained with expert delicacy, and played with great subtlety".

As part of the Arts Festival for the 1956 Melbourne Olympics she performed the Schumann Piano Concerto on 5 December, with the Victorian Symphony Orchestra under Sir Bernard Heinze. She subsequently threw herself into a busy teaching and performing career, making several recordings for the Spotlight label.

In May 1966, she moved from Melbourne to take a position at the Queensland Conservatorium of Music in Brisbane. Here, her students included Piers Lane, Kevin Power, Bernadette Gorman, Norma Marshke, Robert Keane, Geoffrey Cox, Regis Danillon, Keith Crellin, Christopher Wrench, Arthur Do Rozario and the comedian Gerry Connolly. Piers Lane noted, "She could be difficult to cope with, but she had a wonderful sense of humour and a high intelligence. Quite a temper, too. But we didn’t clash, and had a stimulating relationship. I was inspired by her."

In 1968-69, Nancy Weir appeared as the piano soloist with orchestras in concerts presented by the Australian Broadcasting Corporation (then known as the Australian Broadcasting Commission).

During her Queensland years she notably led the Students' Symphonic Safaris bus tours throughout the state and, after retiring from the Conservatorium in 1980, purchased the Rialto Theatre in West End in 1983, which she ran successfully for a few years. Subsequent moves were to Townsville and Pinnacle, west of Mackay, where she bought, restored and lived in a deconsecrated church she renamed "Einsiedeln". "Einsiedeln" was the name of the area of Switzerland where her life was saved by an operation which left her partially deaf. Piers Lane and Weir performed together in this small wooden building. She was attracted to the area through the work of Dorothy Blines, a local piano teacher and co-founder of the Pinnacle Playhouse. Her final home was at Slade Point, Mackay, where for a time she ran a small grocery shop until she sold it after it had several times been invaded by burglars, whom she confronted with her faithful blue cattle dog, Digger, acting as her hearing-aid. Her previous dog, Cully, had also been a most faithful companion, and sometime stage "artiste". Both these dogs were strays who attached themselves to Weir with a tenacity only equalled by her love of them.

In 1989, there was an archival exhibition at Queensland Performing Arts Centre (QPAC) of Weir's original concert programmes, war-time photographs and personal memorabilia. Thereafter, she was awarded an Honorary Doctorate from Griffith University, Queensland Conservatorium. In 2002, she transferred to a retirement home in Brisbane and she died peacefully at Amity, New Farm, on 14 October 2008. Her funeral service began with a recording of her playing of Liszt's Bénédiction de Dieu dans la solitude from Harmonies poétiques et religieuses.

Nancy Weir was a Life Member of the Accompanists Guild of Queensland, Inc..

Her awards include Officer of the Order of Australia (1995) for services to music and music education, an honorary D Mus from Griffith University, the FRAM and the University of Melbourne Conservatorium Centennial Award. The German Government awarded her the Beethoven Commemorative Medal in 1970.

=== Early childhood years ===
Weir remembered one of the first pieces she played, a song called "Horsey, keep your tail up, keep the sun out of my eyes!" With this ditty, and others, such as "Barney Google, with the goo-goo-googley eyes!", she entertained the many visitors who passed through her father's country hotel. Amongst the commercial travellers there was also a group of internationally famous concert artists, such as the legendary pianist Ignaz Friedman, and the equally young Shura Cherkassky who at that time toured country Victoria as well as the larger metropolitan centres. Several commented on the young Miss Weir's precocious talents, until, eventually, she was sent, aged 10 years, to study with Ada Corder (née Freeman).

Teacher and pupil got on famously from the start, and Weir remained faithful to her teacher always, looking after the elderly woman to the very end. It was Ada, as Nancy referred to her, who suggested that the Beethoven Piano Concerto No 3 would be a suitable vehicle for a début concert. Corder was a perfectionist, and Weir remembered a tricky passage which she could not quite get right till Corder warned, "If you don't get it exactly correct, I will not let you play in the concert." The ruse worked, and the 13-year-old's performance on 6 July 1929, with the Melbourne Symphony Orchestra conducted by Fritz Hart, caused astonishment amongst concert-goers and music critics alike. The maturity of her performance caused hundreds of people to follow her car after the concert was over. As she remembered, "They ran behind us, all the way up Collins Street." There was an enthusiastic review of the concert in The Sydney Morning Herald, published on Nancy's 14th birthday, 13 July 1929.

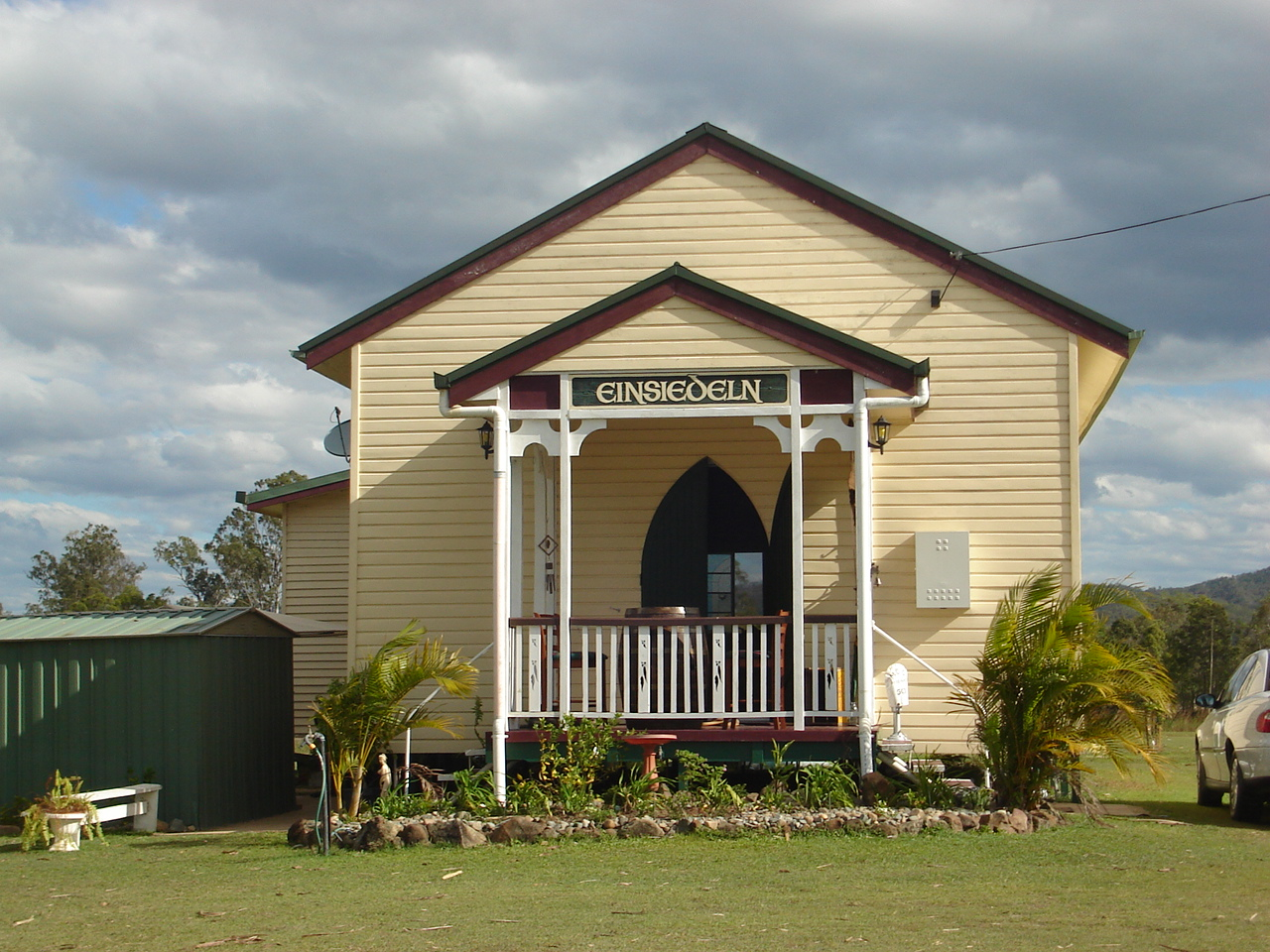
Weir's home, Einsiedeln, at Pinnacle, west of Mackay

=== List of performances ===
- Melbourne Town Hall, 6 July 1929, Beethoven: Piano Concerto No 3, Melbourne Symphony Orchestra, Fritz Hart
- Melbourne Town Hall, 5 December 1956, Schumann Piano Concerto Op 54, Victorian Symphony Orchestra, Sir Bernard Heinze
- Brisbane City Hall, 1979, Beethoven: Piano Concertos Nos 3 and 4, Queensland Symphony Orchestra, Vanco Cavdarski

=== Anecdotes ===
One of the best known anecdotes of the many anecdotes involving Weir's activities is the case of her dashing in her Volkswagen over the Story Bridge, late for a lesson, and discovering that she had left her studio keys at home. Executing a neat U-turn, mid-bridge, she was pulled over by a policeman. She explained her strategy to him, apologised and went on saying that she had a concert at the Conservatorium soon, and invited the policeman to come along. Not only did he not give her a ticket, she sold him one. He did come to the concert and they became very good friends, and he subsequently attended many of her performances.

It is reported that Weir continued to add registration stickers to her car windscreen year-by-year without removing the old ones. After they had formed a significant collection up the left-hand side of the windscreen, she was pulled over by a policeman (presumably not the same one as in the U-turn anecdote) who informed her that they had to be removed. Nancy's solution to the problem was unpredictable, as always: she bought a new car and started over!

Her much-loved dog Cully arrived at her Hamilton flat unannounced, and despite Weir's best efforts to locate the owner, Cully refused to leave. Many happy years together ensued, during which Cully appeared on stage in Bach's Coffee Cantata, Bizet's Carmen (at Innisfail, on a Symphonic Safari) and at many a concert thereafter. Cully was a part-time music critic, who regularly let students know if their performance was not up to standard by producing "the most outrageous howling", in her mistress's words. At the end of her life, Cully, crippled and very weak, was warned by her adoring and saddened owner that she "might have to make that special trip to the vet". That same evening, Cully, who never ventured far from Weir's side, ran out onto the street and was knocked down by a car.

Weir's 1887 Steinway piano has now been fully restored. It may be seen in Greg Gesch's 14-minute video on YouTube.
