= Tahu Matheson =

Australian classical pianist and conductor

Tahu John Parke Matheson (born 1977) is an Australian classical pianist and conductor. He currently resides in London.

== Early life ==
Tahu John Parke Matheson was born in London. He is a descendant of the Ngāi Tahu tribe of Te Wai Pounamu. While his early years were spent in Germany and New Zealand, he moved to Brisbane, Queensland, Australia in 1989 where he completed five years of secondary school education at Brisbane State High School.

== Career ==
=== Piano ===
Tahu began his piano studies at the age of five with his father, international conductor John Matheson. He has studied piano with Kalle Randalu in Germany, and with Oleg Stepanov and Natasha Vlassenko at the Queensland Conservatorium of Music, where he completed his Master of Music.

In 1995 Tahu won the Queensland Piano Competition and made his professional debut in 1996 with a solo recital at the New Zealand International Festival of the Arts. He performed with the New Zealand Symphony Orchestra in 1997 and was invited to record by Kiwi-Pacific Records. Tahu has also performed widely in Australia, both with the Orchestras and solo, and has toured Australia for Musica Viva. Tahu was also awarded the Hilda Woolmer Prize for Best Piano Accompaniment and is a recipient of the Brisbane Club award for 2000.

Tahu has also toured for Chamber Music New Zealand, and has been broadcast on New Zealand and Australian radio and television.

Tahu is a member of Fusion Piano Duo with Lana Higson.

=== Conducting ===
Tahu made his conducting debut in Brisbane with the Southern Cross Soloists. At the end of 2005 he was invited to London to conduct a new opera "Nelson" for the Trafalgar Bicentenary, featuring Jeffrey Black in the title role. Tahu also conducted The Australian Amadeus Players (Mozart Symphonies 40 & 41) in the opening concert for the 2006 4MBS Festival of Classics. Since 2007, Tahu has been working as a conductor with the Opera Australia.

== Trivia ==
- Tahu is known for his height – he is 2.01 metres (6 ft 7 in)
- His first name comes from the Maori tribe Ngāi Tahu
- He is 1/16 Maori
- As a teenager he wanted to grow up huge like Arnold Schwarzenegger
