= Julian Byzantine =

British classical guitarist

Julian Byzantine is a British classical guitarist who has performed all over the world at venues such as Carnegie Hall, Royal Festival Hall, Queen Elizabeth Hall, Wigmore Hall, and the Sydney Opera House.

Born in London, of Armenian descent, he was appointed a professor at the Royal College of Music (succeeding John Williams) at the age of 21, the youngest person to be awarded the post at the time. He now lives in Australia, where he is head of classical guitar studies at Queensland Conservatorium Griffith University.
