= Northern Rivers Symphony Orchestra =

The Northern Rivers Symphony Orchestra is an Australian orchestra based in Tweed Heads NSW, New South Wales.

The orchestra is the premier orchestra for the Gold Coast and Northern Rivers region. It was created in 1991 by Barry Singh, who was the orchestra's artistic director and conductor and has featured on Australian Story on ABC Television. The orchestras current Chief Conductor is Marco Bellasi.

Its performances take place in venues including:

- Queensland Performing Arts Centre (QPAC) Concert Hall
- Gold Coast Art Centre
- Seagulls, Tweed
- Tweed Civic Centre
- Empire Theatre, Toowoomba

The orchestra has performed with the Gold Coast City Ballet, Opera Queensland and Dragon Tenors.
