= Peter Musson =

New Zealand bassoonist (1940–2022)

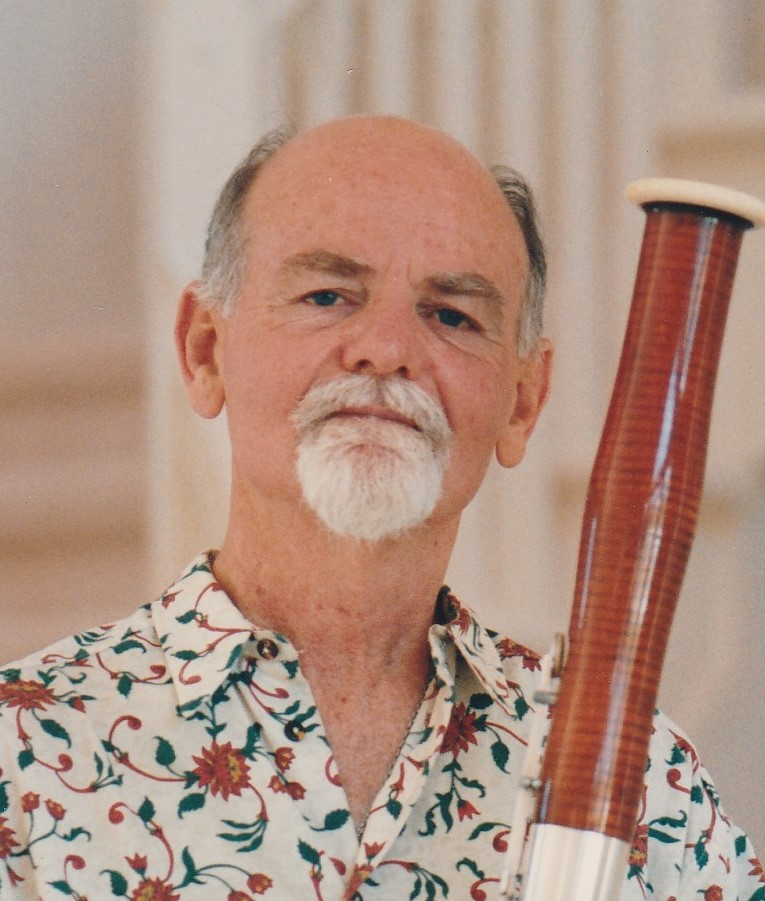
Musson in 1995

Peter Musson (21 May 1940 – 8 April 2022) was a New Zealand bassoonist and bassoon teacher. He was a principal bassoonist in the Queensland Symphony Orchestra and Senior Lecturer in bassoon at the Queensland Conservatorium and was a soloist and member of chamber music ensembles.

== Early life ==
Musson was born in Auckland, New Zealand on 21 May 1940. He received his education from Auckland Grammar School and St Peter's College. He gained a reputation as a child prodigy on clarinet, studying with George Hopkins, later moving to bassoon. In 1956, he auditioned for a position with the NZBC orchestra under James Robertson, the resident conductor of the orchestra, (who had instituted a policy of regular auditioning and reauditioning). Musson was appointed and, at the age of 16, became the youngest ever member of the NZBC Symphony Orchestra.

== Career ==
Peter remained with the NZBC Symphony Orchestra for twelve years (June 1956-March 1967), becoming Principal Bassoonist and also a member of the New Zealand Wind Quintet. In 1967, he left New Zealand in order to broaden his musical experience and travelled widely. After a period as a free-lance player in London, he was appointed to Principal Bassoon positions with, in turn, the Ulster Orchestra in Belfast, the Durban Symphony Orchestra in South Africa, the Niederrhein Sinfoniker in Germany and the Queensland Symphony Orchestra in Brisbane. Peter also appeared as Guest Principal with such orchestras as London's Royal Philharmonic Orchestra, the Gurzenich Orchestra of Cologne, the Australian Chamber Orchestra, the Tasmanian Symphony Orchestra and the Sydney Symphony Orchestra. He has also performed widely as a soloist and as a member of chamber music ensembles.

Peter also had a teaching career with former students, having held professional playing and teaching positions on four continents. He has been on staff at the Belfast School of Music, the Krefeld Musikschule and the Queensland Conservatorium where he was Senior Lecturer in Bassoon and Chamber Music until 2002.

== Personal life ==
Musson had three children: Donna, Paul and Guy. Musson died in Brisbane, Australia on 8 April 2022.

== Discography ==
- "From Fire by Fire" Queensland Wind Soloists 4MBS (1990)
- "William Hurlstone Chamber Music" Continuum (2001)
