= Esther Rofe =

Australian musician and composer (1904–2000)

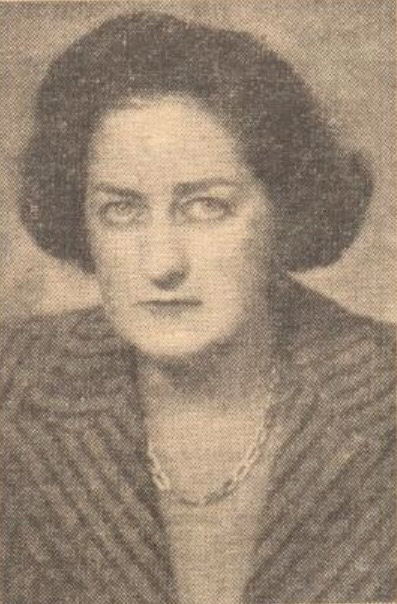
Esther Rofe in 1941

Esther Rofe (14 March 1904 – 26 February 2000) was an Australian musician and composer.

== Biography ==
Esther Rofe was born in 1904 in Melbourne, Australia.

Rofe studied piano with Harold C. Smith and Ada Freeman and violin with Alberto Zelman, Jr. Rofe studied composition with Fritz Hart and A.E. Floyd.

At age 13, Rofe appeared with the Melbourne Symphony Orchestra. She entered the Royal College of Music in London and studied with Gordon Jacob, Ralph Vaughan Williams and R.O. Morris.

During World War II Rofe worked at the Australian Broadcasting Commission (ABC), and the Colgate-Palmolive Radio Unit in Sydney where she began arranging and composing music. Rofe began composing for ballet in 1943.

The Esther Rofe Songbook was published in Melbourne in December 1999.

Rofe and her sister Edith moved to Southport where Rofe lived and worked for twenty years by the sea.

Rofe never married, but fostered a child, Carden James Rofe. Carden had two sons – Hamer Rofe and Malcolm Rofe.

Rofe died on 26 February 2000 and Hamer Rofe & his ex-wife Cathy Rofe, Malcolm Rofe and his wife Christina Rofe scattered her ashes in the Lune River in Southport Bay.

The Esther Rofe Award was established in her honor at the University of Melbourne in Australia.

== Honors and awards ==
- 1993 Composer-of-Honour in the School of Music Conservatorium at Monash University.
- 1998 Australia Day Citizen of the Year award from the City of Boroondara
- 1998 Became a represented composer at the Australian Music Centre (AMC).

== Compositions (incomplete list) ==
=== Piano solo ===
- Choral Prelude II (1927)
- Echo de Vienne
- Fugue in Four Voices
- Für Else (1989)
- Jester (1962)
- Londonderry Air
- Miniature variations (1927)
- Miniature variations on a theme in A minor (1927)
- The Island (1938)
- Pierrette at court (1938)
- Pro-tem suite (1937) - for one hand
- Three Part Invention (1927)

=== Vocal music (solo with piano) ===
- Curtain
- Dinah's song (1987) – words by Tom Rothfield
- Five songs of Walter de la Mare (1940) – words by Walter de la Mare
- Somebody ask: a spiritual for the 1990s (1998) – words by Tom Rothfield
- Tired Man (1935) – words by Anna Wickam
- Two songs of William Blake (1936) – words by William Blake
- Winds of Change (1976)

=== Chamber music ===
- Duet for two pipes - two woodwinds
- A Lament (1924) - flute with piano
- Scherzo (1929) - flute with piano
- Simple string pieces (with Margaret Sutherland) – string quartet
- Tune for three pipes – three woodwinds

=== Ballet ===
- Sea Legend (1943) ballet choreographed by Dorothy Stevenson
- Terra Australis (1946) ballet choreographed by Edouard Borovansky
- L’Amour enchantee (1950) ballet choreographed by Laurel Martyn
- Mathinna (1954) ballet choreographed by Laurel Martyn
- The Lake (1962) rework of L’Amour enchantee for television

=== Opera and operetta ===
- Mogarzea (1926) fairy operetta
