= Alex James (professor) =

Indian machine learning researcher

- Born: India
- Education: Griffith University
- Known for: AI hardware, Neuromorphic VLSI (Very-large-scale integration), Intelligent Imaging and Machine Learning, and Analog Electronics
- Awards: Senior Fellow of HEA; Fellow of British Computer Society (FBCS); Fellow of IET (FIET); Best Associate Editor Award of IEEE TCAS1 for 2020-21
- Scientific career
- Fields: Electrical engineering
- Workplaces: Digital University Kerala

Alex James is an Indian scientist who is a professor of AI hardware at School of Electronic Systems and Automation, and Dean at Digital University Kerala (IIITM-K). He is the professor in charge of Maker Village, Kochi, Chief Investigator of the centre for Intelligent IoT Sensors, and India Innovation Centre for Graphene. James features in top 1% scientists list published by Elsevier BV in the world in the field of Electrical and Electronics Engineering. He appeared in the list for the third consecutive time. He specializes in the scientific field of Memristive Systems, AI hardware, Neuromorphic VLSI (very-large-scale integration) system, Intelligent Imaging and Machine learning, and Analogue electronics.

== Education and career ==
James earned his Ph.D. degree from the Queensland Micro and Nanotechnology Centre, Griffith University, Brisbane, Australia. Since 2009, he has been working as a faculty member at different universities in Australia and India. He was a Member of IET Vision and Imaging Network, and is a Member of BCS’ Fellows Technical Advisory Group (F-TAG). He is the founding chair for IEEE Kerala Section Circuits and Systems Society, and is a fellow of British Computer Society (FBCS), and Institution of Engineering and Technology. He was an Editorial Board Member of Information Fusion (2010–2014), Elsevier, and associate editor for HCIS (2015–2020), Springer; and Guest Associate Editor for IEEE Transactions on Emerging Topics in Computational Intelligence (2017). Currently he is serving as an Associate Editor of IEEE Access, Frontiers in Neuroscience, and IEEE Transactions on Circuits and Systems I: Regular Papers journal.

== Scientific research ==
IIITM-K has achieved a breakthrough in developing Analogue Integrated circuit for implementing Generative Adversarial Networks (GAN) in a joint research project with Analogue Circuits and Image Sensors Lab, Siegen university and Fraunhofer, Germany, and Centre for Excellence in Artificial general intelligence and Neuromorphic Systems (neuroAGI). According to A. P. James, professor at the School of Electronics at IIITM-K, this complicated and meticulous AI circuits research can accelerate and operate GAN applications in low power devices. It also can be used to analyze and interpret 2019-nCoV data for a possible solution to the pandemic. An AI Semantic search engine has been created by a research team led by A.P. James to help researchers gain deeper insights into Scientific Investigation, particularly since the COVID-19 issue has necessitated the collection of a significant amount of complex scientific data. The search engine is called "www.vilokana.in, which is Sanskrit for "finding out.

== Awards and honors ==
James is a member of IEEE CASS Technical committee on Nonlinear Circuits and Systems, IEEE CASS Technical committee on Cellular Nanoscale networks and Memristor Array Computing, IEEE Consumer Technology Society Technical Committee on Quantum in Consumer Technology (QCT), Technical Committee on Machine learning, Deep learning and AI in CE (MDA) and Member of BCS’ Fellows Technical Advisory Group (F-TAG).

James was awarded best associate editor of IEEE Transactions on Circuits and Systems I: Regular Papers TCAS-I, by the IEEE Circuits and Systems Society (IEEE CASS) for the year 2020–21. He has been an associate editor for the journal since 2017. He is also an editorial board member of PeerJ CS and a Senior Member of IEEE, Life Member of ACM, Senior Fellow of HEA.
