= Peter Monteath =

Australian historian and academic

- Born: 1961 (age 64–65); Brisbane, Queensland
- Awards: Fellow of the Alexander von Humboldt Foundation (1997); Frank Broeze Memorial Maritime History Book Prize (2004)

Academic background
- Education: University of Queensland (BA [Hons]); University of Siegen (MA); Griffith University (PhD)
- Thesis: Literature, Politics and War: The Impact of Political Commitment on the International Literature of the Spanish Civil War, 1936–1939 (1990)

Academic work
- Institutions: Flinders University
- Main interests: Modern European and Australian history Prisoners of war and internment
- Notable works: P.O.W. (2011); Red Professor (2015)

Peter David Monteath (born 1961) is an Australian historian and academic. He is a professor in Modern European History at Flinders University in South Australia. Monteath's research interests are in modern European and Australian history. He has a particular interest in prisoners of war, internment, and the German presence in Australia and has written extensively on these subjects.

With Jean Fornasiero and John West-Soob, Monteath co-authored Encountering Terra Australis: the Australian Voyages of Nicolas Baudin and Matthew Flinders (Wakefield Press, 2004), which won the 2004 Frank Broeze Memorial Maritime History Book Prize.

Monteath co-authored with Valerie Munt Red Professor: The Cold War Life of Fred Rose (Wakefield Press, 2015), which was shortlisted for the 2016 Prime Minister's Prize for Australian History.

== Bibliography ==
=== Author ===
- — (1994). Writing the Good Fight: Political Commitment in the International Literature of the Spanish Civil War. Westport, Connecticut: Greenwood Press. ISBN 031328766X.
- —; Fornasiero, Jean; West-Sooby, John (2004). Encountering Terra Australis: The Australian Voyages of Nicolas Baudin and Matthew Flinders. Kent Town, South Australia: Wakefield Press. ISBN 1862546258.
- — (2005). Dear Dr Janzow: Australia's Lutheran Churches and Refugees from Hitler's Germany. Unley, South Australia: Australian Humanities Press. ISBN 0975831305.
- — (2011). P.O.W.: Australian Prisoners of War in Hitler's Reich. Sydney: Macmillan. ISBN 9781742610085.
- —; Paul, Mandy; Martin, Rebecca (2014). Interned: Torrens Island 1914-1915. Mile End, South Australia: Wakefield Press. ISBN 9781743053386.
- —; Munt, Valerie (2015). Red Professor: The Cold War Life of Fred Rose. Mile End, South Australia: Wakefield Press. ISBN 9781743053720.
- — (2017). Escape Artist: The Incredible Second World War of Johnny Peck. Sydney: NewSouth Publishing. ISBN 9781742235509.
- — (2018). Captured Lives: Australia's Wartime Internment Camps. Canberra: NLA Publishing. ISBN 9780642279248.

=== Editor ===
- —, ed. (1994). The Spanish Civil War in Literature, Film, and Art: An International Bibliography of Secondary Literature. Westport, Connecticut: Greenwood Press. ISBN 0313292620.
- Smith, Samuel (2002). — (ed.). Sailing with Flinders: The Journal of Seaman Samuel Smith. Adelaide: Corkwood Press. ISBN 1876247134.
- Creaghe, Caroline (2004). — (ed.). The Diary of Emily Creaghe Creaghe: Explorer. Adelaide: Corkwood Press. ISBN 9781876247140.
- —, ed. (2011). Germans: Travellers, Settlers and their Descendants in South Australia. Kent Town, South Australia: Wakefield Press. ISBN 9781743050101.
- Gerstäcker, Friedrich (2016). — (ed.). Australia: A German traveller in the age of gold. Mile End, South Australia: Wakefield Press. ISBN 9781743054192.
