= Computational Intelligence (journal) =

Artificial intelligence journal

- Discipline: Computer science, artificial intelligence
- Language: English

Publication details
- History: 1985-present
- Publisher: Wiley-Blackwell
- Frequency: Quarterly
- Impact factor: 0.704 (2010)

Standard abbreviations
- ISO 4: Comput. Intell.

Indexing
- CODEN: COMIE6
- ISSN: 0824-7935 (print); 1467-8640 (web)
- LCCN: 86649773
- OCLC no.: 12073389

Links
- Journal homepage; Online access; Online archive

Computational Intelligence Journal is a peer-reviewed scientific journal covering research on artificial intelligence and related areas of computer science. The journal published novel research as well as innovative applications in a broad range of AI, covering Computational Intelligence is an artificial intelligence journal publishing novel research on a broad range of experimental and theoretical topics in AI and computer science. With a broad scope, the journal covers machine learning, knowledge mining, web intelligence, AI language, and philosophical implications.

The journal was established in 1985 and is published by Wiley-Blackwell. Currently, the editors-in-chief is Diane Inkpen.

The quality of the journal as an academic publishing venue is evaluated according to public citation impact metrics. in 2022, the Computational Intelligence Journal CiteScore of Scopus was 5.3, while Clarivate's Web of Science gives it 0.39 in the Journal Citation Indicator and 2,8 in the Journal Impact Factor.
