= Australian Festival of Chamber Music =

Annual chamber music festival in Queensland, Australia

Coordinates: 19°15′27.13″S 146°49′04.23″E

The Australian Festival of Chamber Music (AFCM) is an annual international festival of chamber music in North Queensland, Australia, established in 1991. The festival, held every year at the end of July, was previously held in Townsville, but moved to Cairns-Gimuy in 2026. It is the largest festival dedicated to chamber music in the southern hemisphere.

The AFCM also incorporates an international masterclass for emerging artists, who are taught by dozens of chamber musicians from around the world.

The AFCM is held in partnership with all three levels of government, as well as several commercial, tourism, regional development, and educational organisations. The festival's patron is Jeannette Young, Governor of Queensland.

== History ==
The festival was founded in 1990 by Professor Ray Golding, vice-chancellor of James Cook University, and Theodore Kuchar, who was the AFCM artistic director for the next 16 years until 2006. The premiere edition was held in 1991. The festival began with a conservative focus on the more contemporary music of the classical and romantic periods, but over the first five years, Kuchar started inserting works of Béla Bartók, Ernest Bloch, Bohuslav Martinů, and Dmitri Shostakovich, expanding the musical breadth of the programme.

The festival has tried to resist the perception that it is aimed primarily at cultivated southerners; in 2005, the AFCM had a presence at a North Queensland Cowboys football match, and in 2006 increased local advertising.

In 2007, Piers Lane, a London-based Australian pianist, was appointed artistic director of the AFCM. The 2007 programme involved vocalists and more variety than previous years, in an attempt to appeal to a broader audience, incorporating a "lifestyle approach" focused on music, wine and food.

Piers Lane remained as artistic director until 2017, when he passed the role to Kathryn Stott, another international pianist based in Manchester. The 2022 festival was the first with British/German violinist Jack Liebeck as artistic director, a role he still occupies.

== See also ==
- List of Australian music festivals
