= Sarah Crane =

Australian operatic soprano (born 1972)

Sarah Crane (born 9 September 1972) is an Australian operatic soprano.

== Education ==
Born in Brisbane, Crane graduated in 1997 from the Queensland Conservatorioum of Music and received the Brisbane Lord Mayor's Performing Arts Fellowship. That year, Crane sang in the Australian premiere of Elliot Goldenthal's Fire Water Paper: A Vietnam Oratorio.

In 1997, Crane won Opera Foundation Australia's 1997 Lady Galleghan Memorial Encouragement Award, the German Opera Award and the Australian regional final of the Metropolitan Opera Award which enabled her to be a finalist in the 1998 Metropolitan Opera National Council Auditions in New York. In 1998 she received the American Institute of Musical Studies Award from Opera Foundation Australia which gave her the opportunity to study in Graz, Austria.

== Career ==
During the 1998/1999 and 1999/2000 seasons, Crane was engaged as a member of the Opera Studio at the Cologne Opera. In September 2000, Crane started a one-year contract as a Young Artist with the Opéra national du Rhin in Strasbourg, where she performed the roles of Gretel in Humperdinck's Hänsel und Gretel and of The Female Chorus in Britten's The Rape of Lucretia.

In September 2001, Crane worked as a full-time soloist with the Theater Freiburg in Germany. There she sang Pamina in Mozart's Die Zauberflöte, Ginevra in Handel’s Ariodante, Janthe in Heinrich Marschner's Der Vampyr, and the soprano solo in Bruno Maderna’s Hyperion. During the season, she also made guest appearances in the role of Pamina for the Basel Opera. She continued her engagements in Freiburg for the 2002/2003 season with the role of Marzelline in Beethoven's Fidelio, the title role in Benedetto Marcello’s Arianna and Micaëla in Bizet’s Carmen. She also performed the soprano solos for Frank Martin’s Maria-Triptychon as well as for Karol Szymanowski's Stabat Mater with the Philharmonic Orchestra Freiburg.

When Crane returned to Australia, she sang for Opera Queensland Juliette in Charles Gounod's Roméo et Juliette, Anna in Verdi's Nabucco, and again Pamina and Marzellina. For Opera Australia she sang the First Lady and Pamina (in separate productions) in Die Zauberflöte, Oberto in Handel's Alcina and Angelica in Orlando, the Wood Nymph in Dvořák's Rusalka and again Micäela in Carmen, and Sophie in Massenet's Werther. In 2007, Sarah Crane created the role of Hero in the Victorian Opera and Opera Queensland productions of Richard Mills' opera The Love of the Nightingale.

Her concert engagements include Handel's Messiah, Mozart’s Requiem, Beethoven's Choral Symphony, Brahms’ German Requiem, Orff's Carmina Burana (with The Queensland Orchestra), Opera Under the Stars (in Broome, Western Australia) and appearances with the Queensland Pops Orchestra. In 2006 she appeared in Opera Australia's 50th birthday gala concert at the Sydney Opera House.

== Discography ==
- 2006: Opera Australia's 50th Birthday Gala Concert at the Sydney Opera House; Roadshow Entertainment
- 2007: as Nymph in Rusalka, Richard Hickox (cond), Australian Opera Orchestra, Cheryl Barker, Rosario La Spina, Bruce Martin, Elizabeth Whitehouse, Anne-Marie Owens; Chandos Records
