= Barry Singh =

Barry Singh is the artistic director and conductor of the Northern Rivers Symphony Orchestra.

His journey from a banana plantation in the Murwillumbah Hinterland to the Queensland Conservatorium and to the establishment of the premier orchestra for the Gold Coast and Northern Rivers has been featured on Australian Story on ABC Television.

In 2001, Singh was awarded the prestigious Individual Regional TOAN (The Orchestras of Australia Network) award for fostering excellence in an orchestra in a regional area.
