= Donald Smith (tenor) =

Australian operatic tenor (1920–1998)

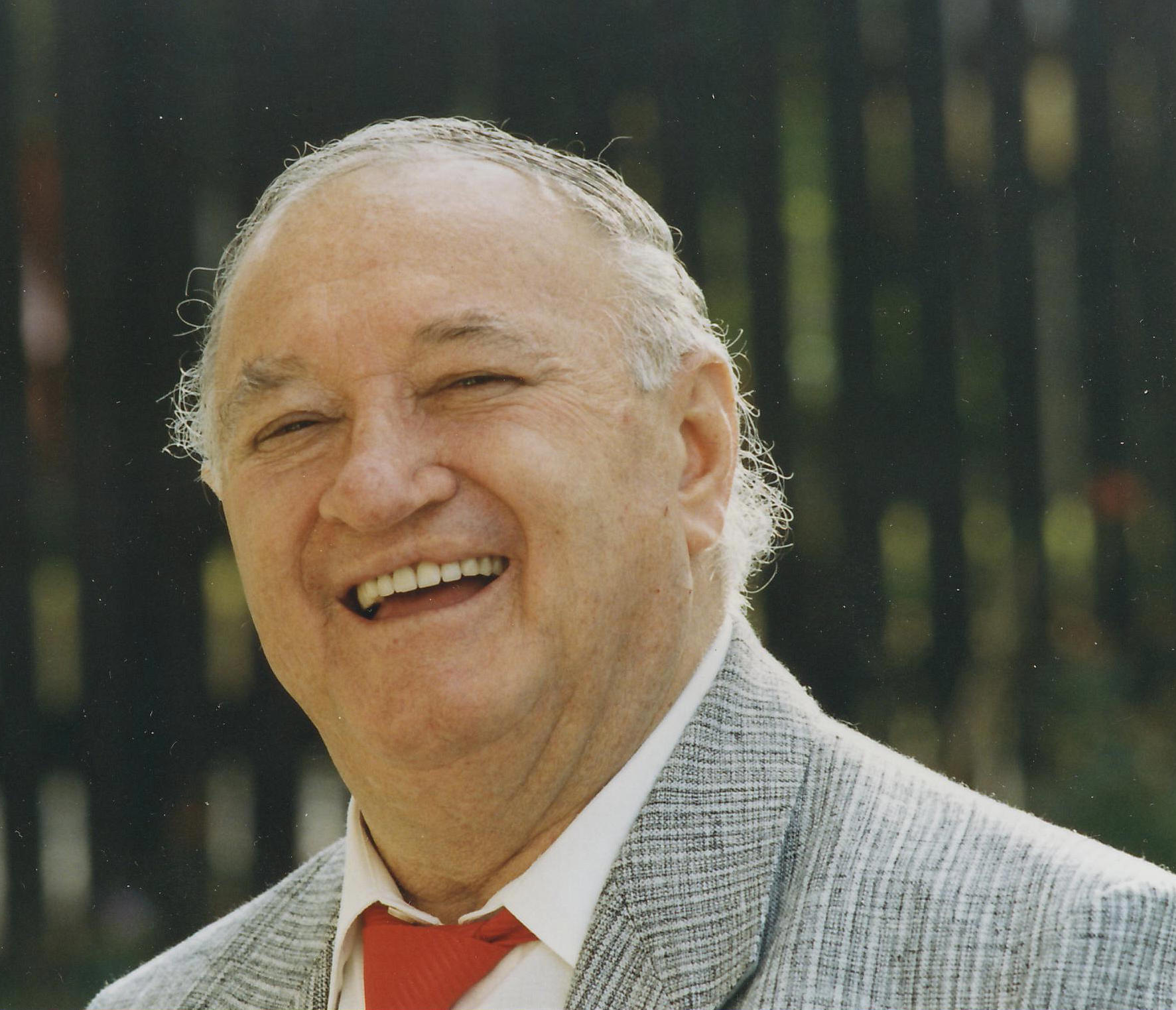
Donald Smith

Donald Sydney Smith OBE (27 July 1920 – 1 December 1998) was an Australian operatic tenor, called "the most popular star in the history of the Australian Opera" and "the second Caruso".

== Early life and education ==
Donald Sydney Smith was born in Bundaberg, Queensland, on 27 July 1920.

Smith's early schooling was spasmodic, and at around 10 years old, while in 4th grade primary school, he was removed from school by his parents to help work on his family's milk run and dairy property.

At around the age of 12 years old he was convicted of illegal use of a motor vehicle and sent to Westbrook Farm Home for boys It is said that Smith was the only youth in the group who was able to drive a motor vehicle, having learned while helping his father deliver milk. Smith was subsequently released into the care of relatives of his mother, a Mr Leslie Robertson in Toowoomba, and he then went to live with them in Brisbane.

After Smith's release from Westbrook, he continued to educate himself whilst working as a sugar cane cutter on properties in and around the Bundaberg area. At the age of 16 he gained his first employment with the Bundaberg Millaquin Sugar Mill and started training as a sugar chemist.

Smith began his singing career on the local radio station 4BU Bundaberg, singing mainly country and western. He also toured the local area with a group called Novac's Troupers.

Smith's singing career is said to have begun in 1941 when bandleader J. J. Kelly (Note: James Joseph Kelly, born in Edinburgh, Scotland on 26 September 1895, trained as a cornettist, but was also a fine tenor. He studied under Alex Owen (of Besses o' th' Barn Band), W. Rimmer and W. Halliwell. He studied harmony under one Professor Bradley of Edinburgh married Alexandrina "Lex" (died November 1974) in May 1914 and settled in Newcastle, New South Wales, sometime around 1915. He was appointed conductor of the Hamilton Citizens' Band and was bandmaster and choirmaster of the Newcastle Citizens' Brass Band, and in 1937 was appointed to lead the Bundaberg band, later led the Maryborough Federal Brass Band. He was much in demand as an adjudicator.) heard him perform at a dance hall, and was so impressed that he trained him for the leading tenor role in Edward German's Merrie England. Mrs J. Greathead was the soprano. He sang under Kelly's direction again two months later.

== World War II ==
Smith enlisted in the World War II effort on 20 December 1941, and was discharged from the 47th Australian Infantry Battalion (Service Number QX48655), of the Citizens Military Forces on 28 October 1943. During this period, he served in the Citizens Military Forces and the Australian Imperial Force, on continuous full-time war service, both in Australia and at Milne Bay, New Guinea. It was in New Guinea on 16 February 1943 that he enlisted in the Regular Army, and it was in New Guinea whilst serving as private and a machine gunner, that he was accidentally wounded in the right hand (later reports mention other injuries). He was taken to an American hospital ship for treatment, and the Australian Army was unaware of where he had been taken, so his wife, who was on her way to hospital to deliver their first daughter Deanna, was advised that he was "missing in action, believed to be deceased". During recuperation for his injuries and after being repatriated to Australia, Joyce (by which name Thelma Joyce Smith was best known) was then advised that Smith was still alive.

== Career ==
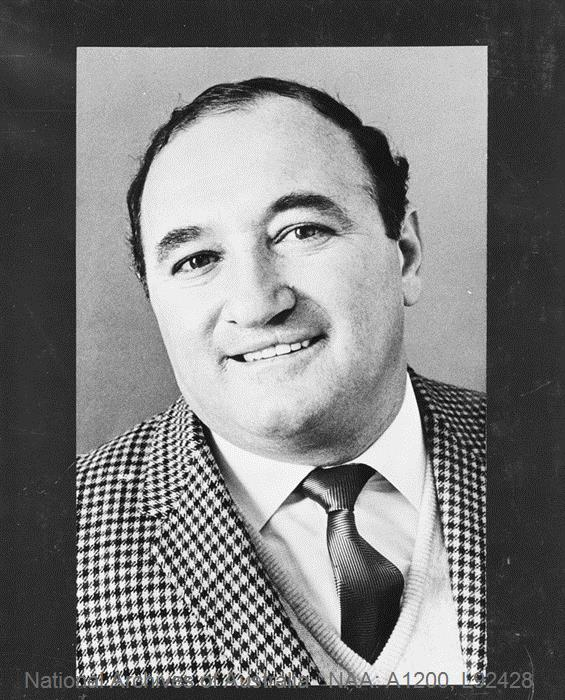
Smith in 1970

Smith had his first singing lesson in Bundaberg with Kate Greathead. It was she who helped him refine his musical ability and vocal technique for his natural tenor voice.

Following Smith's return to civilian life after being discharged from the army, he and Joyce relocated to Toowoomba and eventually to Brisbane, where he found work as a clerk with the Commonwealth Government's Repatriation Department. He found additional work in the David Jones department store as a lift driver, a role traditionally reserved for injured veterans.

In Brisbane Smith was reunited with J. J. Kelly, and under his direction began studying seriously. In May 1947 he was short-listed for a State Scholarship offered by the Queensland Government, and in the finals was one of six selected, only two being male, and both tenors. A condition of the scholarship was that it must be spent on tuition, and in Queensland

=== Brisbane Opera Society ===
In 1947, Smith joined the Brisbane Opera Society, and sang many leading tenor roles with them, including that of Don Caesar de Bazen in William Vincent Wallace's opera Maritana, followed by a "turn" in Will Mahoney's revue "Why Be Serious?" with Buster Fiddess and Joan Wilson. He played Thaddeus in Michael William Balfe's opera The Bohemian Girl (an opera famous for its Act 3 tenor aria: "When Other Lips - Then You'll Remember Me"), the title role in Charles Gounod's Faust, the Duke of Mantua in Giuseppe Verdi's Rigoletto, Don José in Georges Bizet's Carmen, Roméo in Charles Gounod's opera Roméo et Juliette and Turiddu in Pietro Mascagni's Cavalleria Rusticana and Canio in Ruggero Leoncavallo's opera Pagliacci. The role of the jilted lover Canio in particular was one which Smith would eventually "make his own" and for which he would become famous.

=== Mobil Quest ===
In 1952 he took part in the Mobil Quest for operatic voices, sponsored by the Vacuum Oil Company and conducted by a network of 57 radio stations throughout Australia. He won his way to the fifth heat in which he was up against a soprano and a contralto, each singing two arias from well-known operas. As the chosen contestant, Smith advanced to the 4^{th} semi-final, against a lyric-soprano, a mezzo-contralto and a bass-baritone. Smith then advanced to the grand final, held at the Melbourne Town Hall on 3 September. The finalists, besides Smith, were a coloratura soprano, mezzo-soprano, bass-baritone, lyric soprano, mezzo-soprano, and another tenor. Smith's winning arias were "Heaven and Ocean" from La Gioconda and "On with the Motley" from Pagliacci. His prize was $1000 (the price of a new Holden) in cash, and a first-class fare to Italy for an audition at La Scala. The finalists were then expected to participate in a round-Australia concert tour, sponsored by the oil company.

=== Europe and Great Britain ===
Smith did not immediately leave for the centres of culture in Europe. He may have never left Australia, except he was given a scholarship for the National School of Opera in London, valued at £1,500, by the famous Australian singer Joan Hammond. Leaving his family behind, he boarded the Oceania for Italy from Sydney on 2 October 1954. He toured with an Italian company in 1955, alongside singers Gabriella Tucci and Kenneth Neate. They played La Bohème in Australia for J. C. Williamson's before returning to England.

He was back in Bundaberg in November 1957, with pianist Kacrest Jorgensen and baritone Donald Cameron. In 1958 he appeared with the Elizabethan Trust Opera Company; (Note: Elizabethan Trust Opera Company became The Australian Opera Company and later Opera Australia.) and sang Count Almaviva in The Barber of Seville and Tamino in The Magic Flute. In 1960 he sang his first Pinkerton in Madama Butterfly opposite Dame Joan Hammond at Her Majesty's Theatre, Brisbane.

In 1962 Smith returned to England to join the Sadler's Wells Opera Company. Here he performed many Verdi and Puccini operas including Rigoletto, Attila, Ernani, A Masked Ball, Girl of the Golden West, Tosca and Il Trittico. He also made his debut at the Royal Opera House, Covent Garden, where he sang the role of Calaf in Turandot opposite the English soprano Amy Shuard.

After six years in Britain he returned to Australia in 1967 to sing with The Australian Opera, where he appeared as Canio in Pagliacci, Manrico in Il Trovatore, Bob Boles in Benjamin Britten's opera Peter Grimes, the Duke of Mantua in Rigoletto, Dick Johnson in La fanciulla del West, Cavaradossi in Tosca, Radames in Aida, and the King Gustavus in Un Ballo In Maschera. He also appeared in German roles, such as Florestan in Fidelio.

In 1968, the first opera telecast in Australia, Tosca, featured Marie Collier in the title role, Smith as Cavaradossi, and Tito Gobbi as Scarpia.

During the 1970s, Smith and his son Robin Donald, also a tenor, made operatic history together, alternating singing the role of Eric in The Flying Dutchman, in performance with the Australian Opera Company. On other occasions, Robin sang the role of The Steersman while Donald was singing the role of Eric, the only known instance of father and son tenors singing these roles together.

On 21 January 1973 Smith was the first voice to sing in the Sydney Opera House, when he appeared in the first test concert in the Opera Theatre, along with Elizabeth Fretwell and members of the ABC National Training Orchestra, conducted by Robert Miller. He was the first to sing in the Concert Hall and Opera Theatre of the Sydney Opera House.

While Italian opera (and particularly where sung in English) was his natural métier, Smith also performed many concerts and song recitals. Together with his son Donald Robin Smith, who performed professionally under the name Robin Donald, they presented a joint concert in 1973 with John Winther at the piano, and in 1974 a series of 'Smith & Son' concerts throughout Australia.

He was guest artist at Expo '74 at Spokane, Washington in 1974.

Smith resigned from Australian Opera in 1976; he had been unhappy with the management of the company since the appointment of John Winther as general manager in 1973. But Winther resigned, to be replaced in 1977 by Peter Hemmings, and Smith stayed on. Smith's last performance for Australian Opera was in Verdi's I masnadieri in 1980 with Joan Sutherland. While Smith and Sutherland did perform together in a number of concerts at the Sydney Opera House, I masnadieri was the only occasion when these two Australian icons performed a complete staged opera together.

His health deteriorated and in 1981 he retired from the professional operatic stage. He later became a singing teacher in Brisbane at the Queensland Conservatorium of Music.

== Personal ==
At the age of 18, Smith met Thelma Joyce Lovett, whom he married in Bundaberg in 1942. They remained together until his death in Brisbane. They had a son Donald Robin Smith, born in 1942, and two daughters, Deanna Joy Smith (born early 1944) and Coral Beth Smith (Carol?) born around 1945. His children were all talented musically, and his wife was a fine pianist, who accompanied him when practising. His son developed into a fine tenor professionally known as Robin Donald.

== Death and legacy ==
Smith died on 1 December 1998 in the Pleasantville Nursing Home in Wynnum, Brisbane, ending an illustrious operatic career. He was survived by his wife Thelma Joyce (who died on 26 November 2009) and their three children.

== Honours ==
- On 2 June 1973 Smith was appointed an Officer of the Order of the British Empire (Civil), for Music. He was the first resident member of the Australian Opera to be awarded this honour.
- In 1975 he received the Henry Lawson Festival of Arts Award for contribution to opera in Australia.

== Discography ==
Smith made many individual recordings both in England with the Sadler's Wells Opera Company and in Australia with EMI records and other recording companies. He also appears in compilation videos and CD's such as Celebration – 40 Years of Opera, and Australian Singers of Renown in Opera, Operetta & Song, compiled by John Cargher.

=== Albums ===
List of albums, with Australian chart positions
Title	Album details	Peak chart positions
Title	Album details	AUS
Donald Smith Sings	Released: 1975; Format: LP; Label: His Master's Voice (OASD-7584)	-
Serenades (with Adelaide Symphony Orchestra)	Released: 1975; Format: LP; Label: His Master's Voice (OASD-7587)	94
Donald Smith Sings for You (with Adelaide Symphony Orchestra)	Released: 1978; Format: LP, Cassette; Label: World Record Club (R-04989)	-
