= Alex James (mathematician) =

New Zealand mathematician and mathematical biologist

Alex James is a British and New Zealand applied mathematician and mathematical biologist whose research involves the mathematical modelling of wildlife behaviour, gender disparities in academia, and the epidemiology of COVID-19. She is a professor in the school of mathematics and statistics at the University of Canterbury in New Zealand.

== Education and career ==
After studying mathematics at Newcastle University in England, James earned a master's degree at University College London, and completed a PhD at the University of Leeds, working there with John Brindley on combustion engineering and catalytic converters.

She became a lecturer at Sheffield Hallam University in 2001, and moved to the University of Canterbury in 2004.

== Recognition ==
James was named a Fellow of the New Zealand Mathematical Society (NZMS) in 2015, and won the 2018 NZMS Research Award. She was on the team that won the Prime Minister's Science prize in 2020 and won the University of Canterbury Research medal jointly in 2021. She was awarded the NZIAM EO Tuck medal in 2024.
