= Christopher Wrench =

Australian organist

Christopher Wrench (born 14 October 1958 in Brisbane, Australia) is an organist and lecturer.

== Education ==
Wrench attended Brisbane Grammar School, the Queensland Conservatorium of Music (with Nancy Weir) and undertook postgraduate studies in Vienna at the Vienna Conservatorium and then at the Hochschule für Musik (with Michael Radulescu).

== Awards ==
Wrench won 1st Prize at the Melbourne International Festival of Organ and Harpsichord Bach Competition in 1985, the Audience Prize at the 1989 St Albans International Organ Festival, 2nd Prize at the Dublin International Organ Competition in 1989 and 1990, and First Prize at the 1992 Carl Nielsen International Music Competition.

== Career ==
Wrench returned to Australia in 1991 where he became lecturer in organ at the Queensland Conservatorium. He appears regularly as a recitalist throughout Australia and Europe and has performed as soloist with the Adelaide Chamber Orchestra, the Australian Chamber Orchestra, the Queensland Philharmonic Orchestra, Queensland Symphony Orchestra, the Queensland Youth Symphony Orchestra, and the Canberra Symphony Orchestra.

Wrench was Director of Music at Christ Church, Vienna (1986–89) and at St. Mary's Anglican Church, Kangaroo Point in Brisbane from 1994 until 2012. In 2013 he was appointed Director of Music at Christ Church, St Lucia in Brisbane. He is married to choral conductor Emily Cox.

== Discography ==
- 2012: Joy to the World (Christmas at the Sydney Town Hall); Move Records
- 2009: J.S. Bach Organ Sonatas, BWV 525–530, Garrison Church, Copenhagen; Melba Recordings
- 2000: One Two One (20th Century Music for Trumpet & Organ); Move Records
