= Rosario La Spina =

Australian operatic tenor

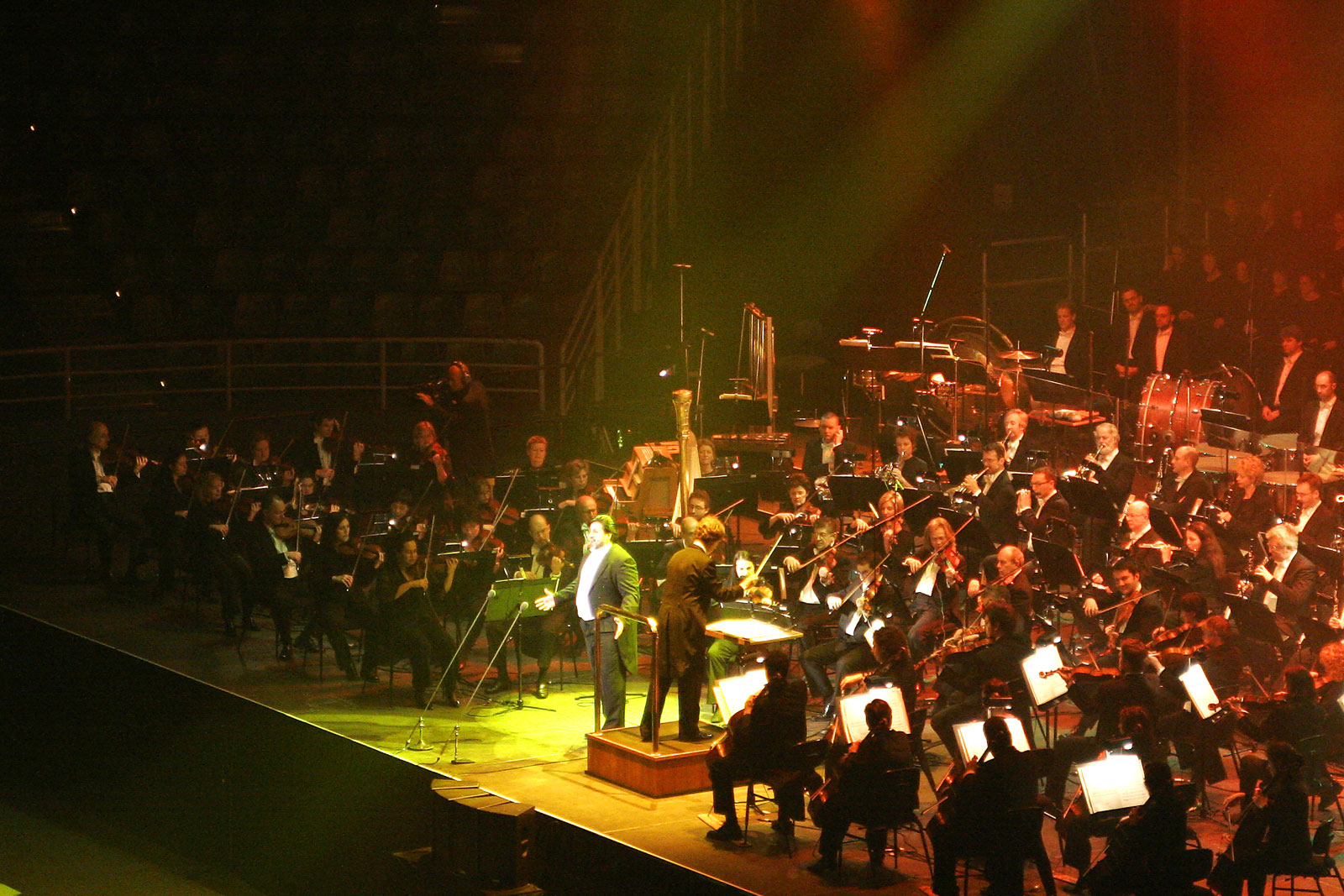
- La Spina performing in concert in the Rod Laver Arena with the Melbourne Symphony Orchestra in 2005
- Born: Brisbane, Queensland, Australia
- Education: Queensland Conservatorium
- Occupation: Operatic tenor
- Years active: 2000–present
- Spouse: Milijana Nikolic
- Website: rosariolaspina.com

Rosario La Spina is an Australian operatic tenor who has had an active international career since the early 2000s. He has worked with many leading opera houses and orchestras, singing under such conductors as Renato Palumbo, Bruno Bartoletti, Gary Bertini, Daniele Callegari and Richard Hickox. Since 2005, he has been particularly active with Opera Australia.

== Early life ==
Rosario La Spina is of Sicilian descent. He was born and raised in Brisbane, Queensland. He first became a bricklayer in his family's business until a work accident at the age of 23 gave him time to take singing lessons.

== Career ==
La Spina began singing lessons with Brisbane vocal tutor Leonard Lee. Three years later, Lee suggested La Spina attend the local music Conservatorium to gain the necessary stage experience. La Spina studied voice at the Queensland Conservatorium where he won the Elizabeth Muir Memorial Prize in 1994. After earning his degree, he pursued graduate work in voice at the Royal Northern College of Music in Manchester, England under Joseph Ward, OBE. During his training, he performed Handel's Messiah, Dvořák's Stabat Mater and Orff's Carmina Burana and made guest appearances as Arturo in Lucia di Lammermoor at the Stadttheater Bern and as soloist in operatic galas with the Ulster Orchestra, Belfast and the Cairo Symphony Orchestra, Egypt. He appeared with the SBS Radio and Television Youth Orchestra and was a member of the Ten Tenors.

In 2000, he won first prize in tenor competition at L'Accademia di La Scala. The competition win enabled him to study for two years in La Scala's young artist program under Luciana Serra and Leyla Gencer, and led to his La Scala debut as the Messenger in Camille Saint-Saëns's Samson and Delilah with Plácido Domingo and Olga Borodina in the title roles.

In 2002, La Spina took first prize in the Mario Del Monaco International Opera Competition. That same year he returned to La Scala for his first principal role at the house as Riccardo in Giuseppe Verdi's Oberto. Later that year he sang Riccardo again at the Teatro Carlo Felice, portrayed The Duke of Mantua in Rigoletto in Tuscany and Rodolfo in La bohème in Calabria.

In 2003, La Spina made his first appearance at the Teatro Regio di Parma during their summer Verdi Festival as Arvino in I Lombardi and portrayed Alfredo in La traviata for his debut at the Teatro Comunale Modena. He made his first appearance in Asia as Luigi in Giacomo Puccini's Il tabarro in Osaka, Japan. In 2004, he appeared at the Teatro Argentina in Rome as The Duke of Mantua; a role he sang again for Opera New Zealand in Auckland and Wellington later that year.

Since 2005, La Spina has been highly active appearing with opera companies and orchestras in his home country. With Opera Australia he has appeared as Alfredo, Calaf in Turandot, Don José in Carmen, the Duke of Mantua, the Prince in The Love for Three Oranges, the Prince in Rusalka, Pinkerton in Madama Butterfly, Rodolfo, and the title role in Les contes d'Hoffmann. With West Australian Opera he has performed Alfredo and Pinkerton and with the State Opera of South Australia he has sung Hoffmann. With the Sydney Symphony Orchestra he has been a soloist in Rossini's Stabat Mater and Verdi's Requiem. He has sung in concerts with The Queensland Orchestra, the Adelaide Symphony Orchestra and the Brisbane Philharmonic Orchestra.

In 2007, La Spina made his American debut as Rodolfo at the Seattle Opera. For Opera Australia under conductor Richard Hickox he performed The Prince in Rusalka which was released on compact disc.

In 2008 and 2009, he sang Don Jose and Pinkerton for Opera Australia at the Sydney Opera House and the Arts Centre Melbourne, and portrayed Radames (Aida) at both the Seattle Opera and Opera Australia. In 2009, La Spina released the solo-CD Rosario with arias and songs.

In August 2010, Rosario and his sister Anna-Maria La Spina released an orchestral/pop crossover album called Always You.

== Personal life ==
The mezzo-soprano Milijana Nikolic is La Spina's wife. The singer-songwriter Anna-Maria La Spina is his sister.

== Discography ==
=== Albums ===
List of albums, with selected chart positions
Title	Album details	Peak chart positions
Title	Album details	AUS
Rosario	Released: 2009; Format: CD; Label: ABC Classics (4763483)	—
Always You (as La Spina)	Released: August 2010; Format: CD; Label: ABC Classics (2745604)	64

=== Features on ===
- 2005: Classic Spectacular in the Rod Laver Arena, Melbourne: ("La donna è mobile", "Au fond du temple saint" (with José Carbó), "Nessun dorma" (with the Melbourne Chorale); Melbourne Symphony Orchestra, Anthony Inglis (cond.); ABC Classics Cat. no. 476 8903
- 2007: as Prince in Rusalka, Richard Hickox (cond), Australian Opera Orchestra, Cheryl Barker, Bruce Martin, Elizabeth Whitehouse, Anne-Marie Owens, Sarah Crane; Chandos Records
- 2008: Puccini Romance, Arias and duets (with Antoinette Halloran) from La bohème, Tosca, Le Villi, La fanciulla del West, La rondine, Turandot, Madama Butterfly; ABC Classics, Cat. No.: 476 6404
- 2009: The Number One Classical Album 2009 (compilation); "Recondita armonia"; Decca Records Cat. no. 480 2016
