= Sonya Marshall-Gradisnik =

Australian immunologist

Sonya Marshall-Gradisnik is a professor of immunology and the director of the National Centre for Neuroimmunology and Emerging Diseases at Griffith University. She is known for her immunological, genetic and calcium channel dysfunction work on myalgic encephelomyelitis/chronic fatigue syndrome (ME/CFS).

Her work on calcium channel dysfunction might help explain findings of natural killer cell dysfunction in ME/CFS. She co-authored the International Consensus Criteria for ME/CFS. and created the largest Australian biobank for ME/CFS research. She has also done research on Gulf War Illness, including on calcium channel dysfunction. Her work has further focussed on the overlap between ME/CFS and Long COVID, again focused on calcium ion channel dysfunction.

Marshall-Gradisnik did her Bachelor at Griffith University, and her PhD at Southern Cross University in Australia. Before her professorship at Griffith University, she was associate professor at Bond University.
