= Robin Donald =

Australian operatic tenor

- Born: Donald Robin Smith; 26 March 1942 (age 84); Bundaberg, Queensland, Australia
- Genres: Operatic tenor
- Years active: 1963–present
- Education: Queensland Conservatorium
- Parents: Donald Smith OBE; Thelma Joyce Lovett

Donald Robin Smith (born 26 March 1942) is an Australian operatic tenor who is known professionally as Robin Donald. He is the son of the Australian operatic tenor Donald Smith.

Robin performed leading operatic tenor roles, including Rudolfo in La bohème, Turridu in Cavalleria rusticana, in many major opera houses throughout Britain, including the Sadler's Wells Opera Company Theatre and the London Coliseum Theatre, Europe (Théâtre Royal de La Monnaie), Australia (Sydney Opera House), and in Christchurch New Zealand, where he sang Florestan in the opera Fidelio for the New Zealand Broadcasting Commission, during a professional operatic career spanning over 35 years.

== Career ==
Donald Robin Smith was born in Bundaberg, Queensland in 1942, the son of the tenor Donald Smith and Thelma Joyce Lovett. Robin Donald's initial studies in music, stagecraft and languages began with the Queensland Conservatorium.

A natural tenor from birth like his famous father, Robin performed in 1963 in his first opera with the Australian Elizabethan Theatre Trust Opera Company at Her Majesty's Theatre in Brisbane, in Gounod's opera Faust. He also gained some of his initial stage performing experiences, as a principal tenor with the Brisbane Gilbert & Sullivan Society and the Queensland Light Opera Company (QLOC), in the musicals Iolanthe, The White Horse Inn and No No Nanette.

Robin Donald began his solo professional international operatic career in England in 1966, as a principal tenor with the Sadler's Wells Opera Company (which later became the English National Opera). Prior to this, he had studied music, acting and stagecraft with The London Opera Centre. During this time he also performed with the Opera Centre's touring company Opera For All, performing the roles of The Duke in Verdi's Rigoletto, Nemorino in Donizetti's L'elisir d'amore, and Basilio in Mozart's The Marriage of Figaro. While at the London Opera Centre, Robin also studied and sang with the New Zealand soprano Kiri Te Kanawa in their production of Così fan tutte.

After performing with the London Opera Centre's touring company 'Opera For All' for over a year, Robin then made his professional operatic debut in London with Sadler's Wells Opera Company at the London Coliseum Theatre in 1968, in the role of 'Rodolfo' in Puccini's La bohème. After singing and touring for some ten years as a principal tenor with Sadler's Wells, in a variety of major tenor roles, as well as performing in Belgium, the Netherlands, Germany and Greece, Robin returned to Australia initially in 1973, to perform in the Australian Opera's (Opera Australia) productions for the opening of the Sydney Opera House. Here Robin sang the roles of Rinuccio in Puccini's Gianni Schicchi, and 'Walther von der Vogelweide' in Wagner's opera Tannhäuser.

Robin then returned to England to fulfill contracts there with Sadler's Wells Opera, in the role of Des Grieux in Massenet's opera Manon (with Valerie Masterson), and for performances with the Welsh National Opera Company' singing the role of Rodolfo in their production of La bohème (with Dame Josephine Barstow as his Mimi). During his years with the English National Opera, Robin also performed the opera La bohème, for several seasons, with both Valerie Masterson, and Dame Anne Evans singing the role of Violetta.

He then returned again permanently to Australia in 1974, with his wife Jeni and son Brent, to accept a contract with the Australian Opera (now Opera Australia). He performed and remained with that company singing a variety of principal tenor roles, including Rodolfo in La bohème, Pinkerton in Madama Butterfly, Gabriel Adorno in Simone Boccanegra (under the baton of Sir Edward Downes), Turiddu in Cavalleria rusticana (with Carlo Felice Cillario), and singing both the tenor roles of Eric and The Steersman in Wagner's The Flying Dutchman, and Alfredo in Johann Strauss's opera Die Fledermaus, for over ten years.

One of Robin Donald's major tenor roles during this period included singing the role of 'Turridu' in Mascagni's opera Cavalleria Rusticana, while his father tenor Donald Smith performed his famous role as 'Canio' in Leoncavallo's opera Pagliacci on the same bill. These performances at the Sydney Opera House were acclaimed at that time, as the only known occasions when a father and son operatic tenors had ever appeared together on the same 'double bill' in these operas, anywhere in the world.

During this period, both Robin Donald and Donald Smith also went on to perform on many other occasions together, in other operas, including Wagner's The Flying Dutchman. On these occasions, Robin sang either of the tenor roles of The Steersman or Eric. Robin and Donald also sang together in Puccini's opera La Fanciulla del West. Throughout 1974 Donald and Robin also performed together in their famous concert series of "Smith & Son" throughout Australia and in Sydney, Melbourne, Brisbane and Adelaide.

== Recordings ==
- Donizetti: Lucia di Lammermoor - Opera Australia (1986), Richard Bonynge conductor. (Arthaus Musik DVD 100242)
- Donizetti: Lucrezia Borgia - Opera Australia (1977), Richard Bonynge conductor. (Opus Arte DVD OAF4026D)
- Verdi: Il trovatore - Opera Australia (1983), Richard Bonynge conductor. (Arthaus Musik DVD 100276)

== Sources ==
- Kutsch, K. J and Riemens, Leo, Großes Sängerlexikon, Francke, 1987, Vol. 1, p. 768. ISBN 3-317-01638-8
- Murdoch, James, A Handbook of Australian Music, Sun Books, 1983, p. 46. ISBN 0-7251-0419-8
- Rich, Maria F., Who's who in Opera, Arno Press, 1976, p. 141. ISBN 0-405-06652-X
