= Natasha Vlassenko =

Russian-Australian pianist and teacher (born 1956)

Natasha Vlassenko OAM
- Birth name: Natalia Lvovna Vlassenko
- Born: 20 November 1956 (age 68); Moscow, USSR
- Origin: Moscow, Russian Federation
- Labels: Master Performers
- Website: www.griffith.edu.au/music/queensland-conservatorium/staff/ms-natasha-vlassenko

Natalia Lvovna "Natasha" Vlassenko OAM (Russian: Ната́лья Льво́вна Вла́сенко; born 20 November 1956) is a Russian-Australian pianist and teacher.

== Life ==
Natasha Vlassenko was born in Moscow, Soviet Russia, to pianist Lev Nikolaevich Vlassenko and English teacher Mikaella Yakovlevna Krutatsovskaya.

Vlassenko was a graduate of Moscow Central Music School under Eleonora Musaelyan. She studied in the Moscow Conservatory under the famous pianist and teacher Yakov Flier. After his death, she continued her postgraduate studies in the class of Flier's pupil professor Lev Vlassenko. She began her artistic career as a soloist of the Moscow Philharmonic Orchestra. She commenced her pedagogic activities as a piano teacher in the Central Music School.

In 1977 she won third prize at the International Beethoven Competition in Vienna. In 1985, she went on to win third prize at the Ferruccio Busoni International Piano Competition in Bolzano, Italy.

At present, Vlassenko resides in Australia. She is Head of Keyboard at the Queensland Conservatorium Griffith University. Many of her students have become prizewinners of national and international competitions and professors in music high schools in the United States, Ireland and Australia.

In 1999 Vlassenko and her husband Oleg Stepanov co-founded the Lev Vlassenko Piano Competition in memory of her father Lev Vlassenko. Vlassenko and Stepanov have since taken up the roles of artistic directors of the piano competition. The competition is the only major piano event in Australia that mirrors the requirements of an international competition and is held in Brisbane every two years since 1999.

Vlassenko has performed in Russia, Italy, Germany, Austria, Japan, New Zealand, China, Australia, Hong Kong, Taiwan, Vietnam and other countries. She has performed under the batons of many conductors such as Gennady Rozhdestvensky, Karl Österreicher, Karl Martin, Mikhail Pletnev, Vladimir Verbitsky, Richard Hickox, Edvard Tchivzhel, Veronika Dudarova and John Curro.

She has recorded a number of CDs in Russia and Australia and is a distinguished artist on the Master Performers record label.

Vlassenko was awarded the Medal of the Order of Australia in the 2022 Queen's Birthday Honours.
