= Vanessa Lee-Ah Mat =

Australian scholar (born 1971)

- Born: Vanessa Sharon Lee; 1971 (age 54–55); Thursday Island, Australia
- Education: Griffith University
- Occupation: Social Epidemiologist
- Years active: 1995-present

Vanessa Lee-Ah Mat (born 1971) is an Australian epidemiologist who was the first Aboriginal and Torres Strait Islander PhD graduate from Griffith University School of Medicine. In 2005, Lee-Ah Mat was recognised by the Parliament of Australia for her dedication and commitment to Thursday Island community, in the Torres Strait.

== Early life and education ==
Vanessa Sharon Lee was born in Thursday Island to Daisy Emily Enid AHMAT and David Jeffery LEE and grew up between Cairns, North Queensland and the Torres Strait. Much of her traditional cultural learnings are from her grandmother, Emily AHMAT (AGALE). In 1995, Lee-Ah Mat graduated with her Bachelor of Teaching Degree with an Early Childhood Major from Queensland University of Technology. She eventually returned to Thursday Island to teach. Through the co-ordination of such events as 'Clean Beach Days', 'come try sports days' and connecting it with the 'seaweed monitoring program', 'good nutrition program' and the 'environmental tree planting program' she led a social impact response to climate change on Thursday Island. The weaving of culture, through kinship, into the co-ordination of these programs has supported community self-determination as the community have expanded toward creating events and programs which support their needs today. In January 2005, the Torres Shire Council, on behalf of the Parliament of Australia, awarded Lee-AhMat with a Certificate of Recognition for her dedication and commitment to the community of Thursday Island, in the Torres Strait.

Lee-Ah Mat progressed to graduate, towards the end of 2006, with her Master of Public Health– nutrition epidemiology, majoring in Indigenous Health from the University of Queensland. This research led Lee-Ah Mat to relocate to Bangladesh for five months investigating ‘vitamin A deficiency in pregnant women’ where the research found that 2.5% of the women were sub-clinical Vitamin A deficiency. Obtaining a work study scholarship in 2007 to enroll in a PhD at Griffith University; Lee-Ah Mat focused on Aboriginal communities and services having autonomy of their health, while raising her sons She graduated as a Doctor of Philosophy, in the discipline of Medicine, in 2016.

== Career ==
Lee-Ah Mat relocated to Sydney, in 2011 for a continuing Senior Lecturer position at the University of Sydney within the Faculty of Health Sciences where she became academically instrumental in creating change for Aboriginal and Torres Strait Islander people.^{[5][6]} She led the development and implementation of Indigenous core competencies into Australian Public Health Curriculum (2005 to 2015) as the deputy chair, and later chair (2015 to 2019) of the Public Health Indigenous Leadership in Education Network. Moreover, Lee translated Indigenous knowledges into the wider public health curricula as a member of the executive board of the Council of Academic Public Health Institutions Australasia. She contributed to the first edition of the National Indigenous Public Health Curriculum Framework (the why). Then following the resignation of Bill Gennat; Lee-Ah Mat led the evaluation of how Schools of Public Health within Australia implemented the Public Health Indigenous core competencies resulting in a second edition of the Aboriginal and Torres Strait Islander Public Health Curriculum Framework (the how). Lee was instrumental in connecting the Public Health Indigenous Leadership in Education Network with Māori, New Zealand. Following completion of this instrumental work Lee-Ah Mat focused back on advocating for social change with Aboriginal and Torres Strait Islander communities.

Parallel to her Aboriginal and Torres Strait Islander curricula work, PhD, being an academic and single parenting, Lee-Ah Mat continued working toward social change through Public Health for Aboriginal and Torres Strait Islander people. She was the first Aboriginal and Torres Strait Islander Office Bearer for the National Public Health Association of Australia, holding the position of Vice President (VP) Aboriginal and Torres Strait Islander health, unofficially from 2011 to 2013 and then officially from 2013 to 2015. During her time as the VP, Lee-Ah Mat contributed in the fight for Aboriginal and Torres Strait Islander self-determination and human rights through public policy and as a public health representative on the Close the Gap advocacy. This advocacy led her to working with various Government agencies as a key advisor on various policy documents towards Closing the Gap. In 2017 Lee-Ah Mat accepted the nomination to become the first Aboriginal and Torres Strait Islander Independent Director for Suicide Prevention Australia.

Lee-Ah Mat was interviewed by Annie Gaffney in 2024 on the Australian responses to Covid-19. The recording can be found at the National Library of Australia.
