= Piers Lane =

Australian pianist (born 1958)

Piers Lane AO
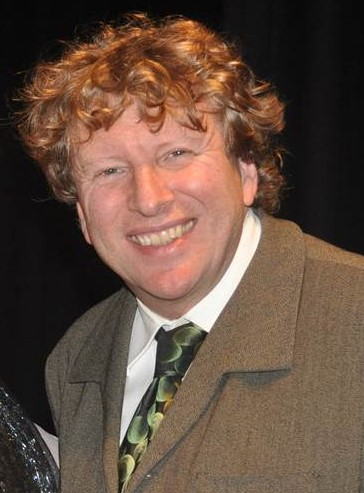
- Lane, pictured as the artistic director of the Australian Festival of Chamber Music

Background information
- Born: 8 January 1958 (age 68); London, UK
- Genres: Classical music
- Occupations: Pianist; academic; festival director
- Instrument: Piano
- Years active: 1977–present
- Website: http://www.pierslane.com/
- Education: Queensland Conservatorium

Piers Lane AO (born 8 January 1958) is an Australian classical pianist.

== Early life and education ==
Lane's English father and Australian mother met while auditioning as piano students for the Royal College of Music. Lane was born in London and he grew up in Brisbane. He graduated with a Medal of Excellence from the Queensland Conservatorium of Music, where his teacher was Nancy Weir, winning the Margaret Nickson Prize in 1978 and the Ruby C Cooling prize in 1977 and 1978. He was later awarded an honorary doctorate by the conservatorium.

He first came to prominence at the inaugural Sydney International Piano Competition in 1977, at which he was named Best Australian Pianist (he was a judge at the 2004 competition). He later studied overseas on a Churchill Fellowship.

== Career ==
Highlights of Lane's career include a standing ovation for Busoni's Piano Concerto at Carnegie Hall in New York with the American Symphony Orchestra under Leon Botstein; Beethoven's Emperor Concerto with The Queensland Orchestra, which received a Limelight Award for Best Orchestral Concert of 2007; concerto appearances with the City of Birmingham Symphony, London Philharmonic, Hallé and Ulster Orchestras; a solo recital in Birmingham's Symphony Hall for the BBC; a three-recital series called Metamorphoses and an all-Chopin recital at the Wigmore Hall in London; and appearances in many major piano festivals in the United States, the United Kingdom, France, Germany, Italy and Scandinavia. He has also played with all ABC and BBC Orchestras, the Aarhus, City of Birmingham, Bournemouth, Gothenburg and New Zealand Symphony Orchestras, the Hallé, Philharmonia, Kanazawa Ensemble and City of London Sinfonia, the London, Royal Liverpool Philharmonic and Royal Philharmonic Orchestras and the Orchestre National de France among many others. He has been soloist five times at the BBC Proms in London's Royal Albert Hall.

Engagements in Australia and New Zealand during 2008 include a second national tour with Cheryl Barker and her husband baritone Peter Coleman-Wright for Musica Viva Australia, concerto performances in Christchurch and Dunedin and solo recitals in Adelaide, Auckland, Brisbane, Newcastle, Noosa and Perth.

Recent collaborations as a chamber player have included a Musica Viva tour of Australia with violist/composer Brett Dean and performances with Anne Sofie von Otter and Bengt Forsberg in Malmö, Stockholm and the Bergen International Festival. He continues his long-standing partnership with British violinist Tasmin Little in UK recital tours. Piers Lane is Patron of the Accompanists Guild of Queensland, Inc.

Since 2007, Lane is the artistic director of the Australian Festival of Chamber Music held annually in Townsville.

Lane has an extensive discography on the Hyperion label and has also recorded for EMI, Decca, BMG, Lyrita and Unicorn-Khanchana. Recent releases from Hyperion include concertos by Eyvind Alnæs and Christian Sinding, a Delius song disc with Yvonne Kenny and a recording of Ernest Bloch's Piano Quintets with the Goldner String Quartet, which was an Editor's Choice in the December 2007 Gramophone magazine and BBC Music Magazine's Record of the Month for February 2008. He is one of the few pianists to have recorded John Ireland's Piano Concerto in E-flat major. In 2014 Hyperion released his recording of the complete piano concertos of Malcolm Williamson, including the world premiere recording of the 4th Piano Concerto. Lane is a well-known voice on BBC Radio 3, having written and presented more than 100 programs, including a 54-part series called The Piano.

In 1994 he was made an Honorary Member of the Royal Academy of Music, where he has been a professor of piano since 1989. In 2007 he received an honorary doctorate from Griffith University, Brisbane. Lane is patron and an active supporter of the Tait Memorial Trust in London, a charitable foundation to support young Australian performing artists in the UK.

Lane is the artistic director of the Myra Hess Day held annually at the National Gallery in London, and of the 2009 Bloch Festival at Wigmore Hall. Lane's recording of Ernest Bloch Piano Quintets Nos. 1 and 2 with the Goldner Quartet (Hyperion) was nominated for BBC Music Magazine Awards in 2009.

In the 2012 Queen's Birthday Honours list, Lane was named an Officer of the Order of Australia for "distinguished service to the performing arts as an internationally renowned classical pianist, to professional and cultural organisations, and to the development of emerging musicians".

In April 2015, following the death of the inaugural artistic director Warren Thomson in February, Piers Lane was announced as the artistic director of the 2016 Sydney International Piano Competition.

Lane won the Sir Bernard Heinze Memorial Award in 2022.
