= Queensland Conservatorium Griffith University =

Music school in Brisbane, Australia

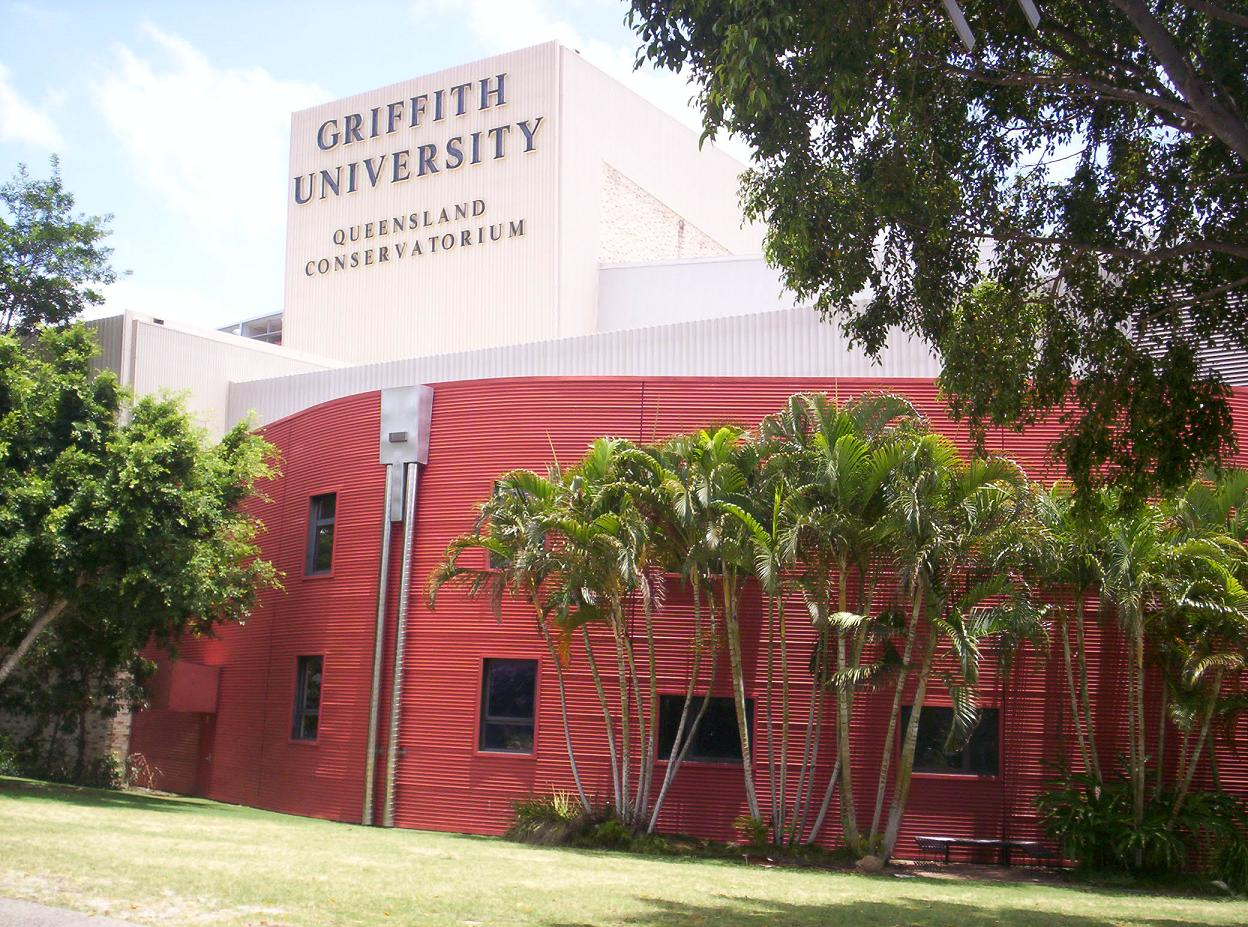
- Former name: Queensland Conservatorium of Music
- Type: Public
- Established: 1957
- Parent institution: Griffith University
- Director: Bernard Lanskey
- Students: 800
- Location: Brisbane, Queensland, Australia; 27.4766°S 153.0205°E

Queensland Conservatorium Griffith University (formerly the Queensland Conservatorium of Music) is a selective, audition based music school located in Brisbane, Queensland, Australia, and is part of Griffith University.

== History ==
The Conservatorium was established by the state government and opened on 18 February 1957, with English composer William Lovelock as director. The school was originally located in South Brisbane Town Hall. In 1971 the Conservatorium became autonomous from the state government as a College of Advanced Education, and in 1975 relocated to a new complex at Gardens Point. The school opened a second campus in Mackay in 1989, which became part of Central Queensland University in 1995.

The Dawkins Revolution led to the Conservatorium becoming an institution of Griffith University in 1991. As part of this amalgamation, the school moved into its current facility in the South Bank Parklands in 1996, and was renamed Queensland Conservatorium Griffith University. Queensland University of Technology took over the Conservatorium's Garden Point facilities, including the QUT Gardens Theatre as it became known.

The institution is affectionately known as "the Con" to students. In 1999, the Conservatorium launched its Bachelor of Popular Music program and its new Gold Coast campus, both of which were established under the direction of Associate Professor Garry Tamlyn. From 2000 this course has been taught from an information technology facility in the Gold Coast Campus of Griffith University. In 2003 the Conservatorium Research Centre (QCRC) was opened as part of the 30 innovative research centres in the University. The Research Centre aims to investigate the dynamics of contemporary musical environments.

In 2019, the Bachelor of Popular Music moved to the South Bank campus and became a subject major within the Bachelor of Music course.

== Facilities ==
Facilities include the Conservatorium Theatre—also used for smaller productions by Opera Queensland— which seats a maximum of 727 and has one of the highest fly towers in Australia, the Ian Hanger Recital Hall which seats 200 and the Basil Jones Orchestra Hall. There are also music production, post production, multimedia lab and recording facilities both in the South Bank and Gold Coast Campuses.

The Queensland Conservatorium also includes the Young Conservatorium, an external, classical based music program for pre-schoolers to year 12 students. In the past 12 months the "Young Con" has engaged more than 1500 students in performances.

In 2007 the Conservatorium celebrated its 50th anniversary with alumni reunions and visiting artists from around the world.

== Staff ==
=== Former directors ===
Former director include:

- William Lovelock (1957–1959)
- Basil Jones (1960–1980)
- Roy Wales (1981–1987)
- Anthony Camden (1988–1993)
- Simone De Haan (1996–2002)
- Peter Roennfeldt (2002–2009)
- Huib Schippers (2009–2012)
- Don Lebler (2012–2013; acting)
- Scott Harrison (2013–2020)
- Gemma Carey (2020–2021; acting)
- Bernard Lanskey (2021–2025)
- Vanessa Tomlinson (2026–present)

=== Notable staff ===
Notable staff include:

- Nora Baird MBE
- Julian Byzantine
- John Curro
- Janet Delpratt
- Margreta Elkins
- Ralph Hultgren
- Carmel Kaine
- Stephen Leek
- Peter Musson
- Max Olding
- Jan Sedivka
- Larry Sitsky
- Donald Smith, father of alumnus Robin Donald
- Paul Terracini 1982–88
- Vanessa Tomlinson
- Carl Vine
- Lev Vlassenko
- Natasha Vlassenko
- Nancy Weir
- Christopher Wrench

== Alumni ==
Notable students who attended the Queensland Conservatorium of Music include:

- Daniel Amalm
- Jason Barry-Smith
- Jeffrey Black
- Ray Chen
- Gerry Connolly
- Sarah Crane
- Tyson Illingworth (known as TyDi)
- Brett Dean
- Candy Devine
- Robin Donald, son of Conservatorium teacher Donald Smith
- Helen Donaldson
- Lisa Gasteen
- Clare Gormley and Miriam Gormley
- Dami Im
- Graeme Jennings
- Astrid Jorgensen
- Kanon (singer)
- Piers Lane
- Rosario La Spina
- Adam Lopez
- Tahu Matheson
- Kate Miller-Heidke
- Courtney Monsma
- Katie Noonan
- Barnaby Ralph
- John Rodgers (musician)
- Barry Singh
- Megan Washington
- Jonathon Welch
- Christopher Wrench
- The Kite String Tangle
- TwoSet Violin (Brett Yang and Eddy Chen)
- Toby Wren

== Awards ==
=== APRA Classical Music Awards ===
The APRA Classical Music Awards are presented annually by Australasian Performing Right Association (APRA) and Australian Music Centre (AMC).

| Year | Nominee / work | Award | Result |
|---|---|---|---|
| 2006 | Encounters: Meetings in Australian Music program – curated by Vincent Plush – Queensland Conservatorium Research Centre, Griffith University | Outstanding Contribution by an Organisation | Won |
