= John Curro =

Australian musician (1932–2019)

John Ronald Curro AM MBE (6 December 1932 – 6 November 2019) was an Australian violinist, violist, conductor and music director.

Curro was the founder (1966) and Director of Music of the Queensland Youth Orchestras, with which he established the National Youth Concerto Competition (NYCC).

== Honours and awards ==
Curro was appointed a Member of the Order of the British Empire in 1981 and a Member of the Order of Australia in 1995.

He was awarded the Centenary Medal in 2001.

=== Bernard Heinze Memorial Award ===
The Sir Bernard Heinze Memorial Award is given to a person who has made an outstanding contribution to music in Australia.

Year	Nominee / work	Award	Result	Ref.
2000	John Curro	Sir Bernard Heinze Memorial Award	awarded	

=== Don Banks Music Award ===
The Don Banks Music Award was established in 1984 to publicly honour a senior artist of high distinction who has made an outstanding and sustained contribution to music in Australia. It was founded by the Australia Council in honour of Don Banks, Australian composer, performer and the first chair of its music board.

Year	Nominee / work	Award	Result
2002	John Curro	Don Banks Music Award	Awarded

=== Queensland Greats Awards ===
The Queensland Greats Awards commenced in 2001 and recognise outstanding Queenslanders for their years of dedication and contribution to the development of the state and their role in strengthening and shaping the community in Queensland, Australia.

Year	Nominee / work	Award	Result	Ref.
2016	John Curro	Queensland Greats Awards	Awarded	
