= Bernadette Cullen =

Australian Dramatic Mezzo-soprano

Bernadette Eileen Cullen is an Australian dramatic mezzo-soprano.

== Early years ==
Born in Brisbane, she attended All Hallows' School. She received a diploma in kindergarten teaching from Kindergarten Teachers College in Sydney, New South Wales. Cullen worked as a kindergarten teacher in Brisbane and Sydney before entering what was then called the N.S.W. Conservatorium of Music (now the Sydney Conservatorium of Music) to undertake a Diploma of Operatic Art graduating in 1978. This degree was recognized by Sydney University in 2011.

== Operatic career ==
She joined The Australian Opera's (now Opera Australia) Schools Programme as a principal artist in 1979, touring NSW schools performing in Sid the Serpent. She then joined the OA chorus for a brief period in 1980. At that time, her vocal coach was American Ernest St John Metz (known as Jack Metz). In 1991, she became a full-time principal artist for the company, a position she held until 1990 when she moved to London to pursue and international career. Her principal role debut for OA was Cherubino (The Marriage of Figaro) in 1981. Other roles included Dorabella (Cosi fan tutte), Maffio Orsini (Lucrezia Borgia) with Dame Joan Sutherland and Richard Bonynge in the Sydney Opera House Concert Hall in 1982, Madrigal Singer (Manon Lescaut), Stephano (Romeo et Juliette), Lady Saphir (Patience), 2nd Lady (The Magic Flute), Antigone (Antigone), Javotte (Manon), The Muse/Nicklausse (The Tales of Hoffmann) with Dame Joan Sutherland and Richard Bonynge, Secretary (The Consul) as well as understudying a number of roles including Octavian and Adalgisa. In 1986, she sang the title role of Angelina in Rossini's La Cenerentola for OA and was chosen by Dame Joan Sutherland and Richard Bonynge to appear with them in concert in Perth. Other roles included Rosina (The Barber of Seville), Giulietta (The Tales of Hoffmann), Brangane (Tristan und Isolde), Ottavia (L'incoronazione di Poppea), and Charlotte (Werther).

During these years, she also performed Dorabella (Cosi fan tutte) for Hong Kong Festival, Adalgisa (Norma) with Ghena Dimitrova, Eboli (Don Carlos), and Amneris (Aida) all for the Victorian State Opera (VSO). In 1990, she moved to London, making her UK debut as Isolier (Le Comte Ory) for Welsh National Opera conducted by Carlo Rizzi. Other performances include Donna Elvira (Don Giovanni) with Sir Charles Mackerras for the opening of the Tyl Theatre in Prague in 1991, Leonora (La Favorita) for WNO, including a Royal Gala Performance in the presence of the Princess of Wales at the Royal Opera House Covent Garden, Zaida (Il Turco in Italia) in Lille, Brangane (Tristan und Isolde) for Scottish Opera with Sir Richard Armstrong, Dido (Dido and Aenaes) for Teatro Massimo in Palermo, Donna Elvira for Lyric Opera of Queensland, Brangane and Mistress Quickly (Falstaff) with Simone Young at the Hamburg Staatsoper, Amneris at Berlin Staatsoper, and Azucena (Il trovatore) for the Bayerische Staatsoper with Zubin Mehta. Other OA performances include Cassandre (Les Troyens), Sesto (La clemenza di Tito), Donna Elvira, Venus (Tannhäuser) Azucena, Amneris with Simone Young, Ortrud (Lohengrin) with Sebatian Weigle, Ulrica (Un ballo in maschera), Eboli (Don Carlos), Santuzza (Cavalleria Rusticana) with Simone Young, Dalila (Samson et Dalila), Komponist (Ariadne auf Naxos), and Herodias (Salome) with Simone Young and Phillippe Augin. She also performed Brangane and Amneris for West Australian Opera, Dalila for the Perth Arts Festival, and Brangane for the Brisbane Festival. She was scheduled to sing the role of Fricka in Wagner's Ring Cycle for the Adelaide Festival in 2004 however had to withdraw due to illness.

== Concert career ==
Concert repertoire includes Fricka (Das Rheingold and Die Walküre) for Sydney Symphony with Edo de Waart, Third Maid (Elektra) for OA, Mahler Symphony No. 3 with Zubin Mehta and the Israel Philharmonic in Sydney in 2009 and for the 2010 Kanazawa Festival Japan, Mahler's Symphony No. 8 with Vladimir Ashkenazy, the SSO and NZ Festival. Mahler's Symphony No. 8 with Charles Dutoit, Mahler's Symphony No. 2 with the Melbourne Symphony Orchestra and Markus Stenz and Oleg Caetani and Aldeburgh Festival with Paul Kildea, Herodias for the Hong Kong Festival with Edo de Waart, Mahler's Das Lied von der Erde with Simone Young and the Vienna State Opera, also for Adelaide Festival. Verdi Requiem for Halle Orchestra, Opera Australia, Bergen Philharmonic, Sydney Symphony, WA Symphony, Qld Symphony, at Durham Cathedral, Royal Albert Hall. Wagner's Wesendonck Lieder – Qld Symphony, Wagner's Gurrelieder for Perth International Arts festival and MSO. Dream of Gerontius in Stavanger, Belfast, Londonderry and Dublin. Beethoven's 9th Symphony Royal Scottish National Orchestra – Scotland, Janáček's Glagolitic Mass & Brahms Alto Rhapsody – WASO, Rossini Petite Messe Solennelle – SSO, Sir Paul McCartney's Liverpool Oratorio in Liverpool – UK, Bergen – Norway, Bolzano – Italy, Cracow – Poland, Handel's Jephtha for Scottish Chamber Orchestra with Sir Charles Mackerras, Berlioz Les Nuits dÉte for New Zealand Symphony Orchestra's national tour. Other notable concerts include a New Year's Eve Gala concerts with Simone Young in Antwerp and Sydney plus a Bellini Gala at the Sydney Opera House in 2002, Richard Bonynges' 80th Birthday Concert at the City Recital Hall, Sydney in 2010 for the Joan Sutherland Society.

In 2011, she judged the IFAC Australian Singing Competition and the Inaugural Joan Sutherland & Richard Bonynge Bel Canto Award, which she annually judges alongside the Elizabeth Connell Prize. She has also adjudicated the McDonald's Aria as part of the Sydney Eisteddfod, Opera Awards and New Zealand's Rotorua Eisteddfod.

== Charity Work ==
She has performed in many charity concerts throughout her operatic career and given her services as a judge and mentor, including for;

- Opera Australia;
- Australian Opera Benevolent Fund;
- Tsunami Relief Fund, Aids Research;
- Malcolm Sargent Children's Cancer Foundation;
- Pacific Opera;
- The Joan Sutherland Society of the Sydney;
- The Joan Sutherland & Richard Bonynge Foundation;
- Deaf and Blind Association;
- Cancer Council of Australia;
- Opera & Arts Support Group;
- Opera Foundation Australia;
- Elizabeth Connell Scholarship.

== Recordings ==
- Verdi Requiem with Simone Young, ABC Classics and Opera Australia,
- Mahler Symphony No.2 with Markus Stenz and Melbourne Symphony Orchestra,
- Mahler Symphony No.8 with Vladimir Ashkenazy and Sydney Symphony Orchestra,
- The Bohemian Girl by Balfe with Richard Bonynge (Decca),
- Lurline by William Vincent Wallace with Richard Bonynge (Naxos),
- Stravinsky's Pulcinella with the Australian Chamber Orchestra,
- DVD – Amneris in Aida for Opera Australia conducted by Simone Young,
- DVD – Angelina in La Cenerentola for Opera Australia.

== Awards, honours & prizes ==
- Metropolitan Opera Award
- Bayreuth Scholarship (1989)
- Vienna State Opera Award (1994)
- Marie Watson-Blake Award for Outstanding Achievement by the Women Chief's of Enterprises – International, Queensland Branch, 1997.
- Various Victorian Green Room Award Nominations
- Helpmann Award Nomination for Azucena in Il trovatore (2005) Opera Australia

== Positions ==
- A member of the Artistic Advisory Council of the Joan Sutherland & Richard Bonynge Foundation.
- Patron and Artistic Advisor of the Elizabeth Connell Scholarship Trust
- A member of the Council of Patrons for Pacific Opera.

== See also ==
- Debrett's Handbook of Australia
- Who's Who of Australian Women
- ABC Classics
- Naxos
- Decca
- Opera Australia
- Sydney Symphony
- A Prima Donna's Progress, The Autobiography of Joan Sutherland – Random House Australia
- Timing is Everything – Moffatt Oxenbould's Memoirs
- Sydney Conservatorium of Music
