= Jason Barry-Smith =

Australian operatic baritone (born 1969)

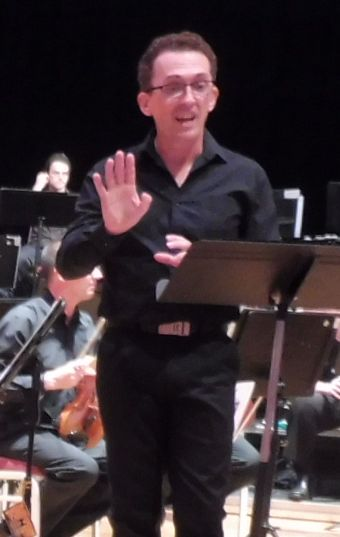
- Born: 12 December 1969 (age 56); Brisbane, Australia
- Occupations: operatic baritone, vocal coach, composer, musical director, arranger, creative director

Jason Barry-Smith (born 12 December 1969) is an Australian operatic baritone, vocal coach, composer, and arranger. He works with organisations such as Opera Queensland, the Queensland Symphony Orchestra, Seven Network, and the Queensland Youth Choir.

== Education ==
Barry-Smith, born in Brisbane, Queensland, is a former student of Kedron State High School. He graduated with a Medal of Excellence from the Queensland Conservatorium of Music in 1991. He later studied at the Hochschule für Musik und Theater München with Professor Hanno Blaschke during 1989/90 and later in London with Janice Chapman in 1999 and in Rome with Margaret Baker-Genovesi in 2002.

== Awards ==
Barry-Smith has received numerous accolades; in 1992 he won the Marianne Mathy Scholarship (The Mathy) in the Australian Singing Competition, in 2001 he won Opera Foundation Australia's Italian Opera Award, and for the first five months of 2002 he was resident at the Teatro dell'Opera di Roma, Italy.

== Concert performances ==
As a concert soloist, Barry-Smith has performed in Fauré's Requiem (Melbourne Symphony Orchestra), Haydn's Paukenmesse (Queensland Philharmonic Orchestra), Bach's St John Passion (Brisbane Chorale), Nigel Butterley's Lawrence Hargrave Flying Alone (Sydney Symphony Orchestra), Bach's St Matthew Passion, Christmas Oratorio and Purcell's Ode to St Cecilia’s Day (Bach Society of Queensland), and as the baritone soloist in the Australian composer's Richard Mills 2001 work, Symphonic Poems. In 2012, Barry-Smith was a soloist in the Australian premiere of Graun's 1755 oratorio Der Tod Jesu. He was the soloist in HK Gruber's Frankenstein!! at the 2016 Four Winds Festival in Bermagui, New South Wales.

== Stage roles ==
While still studying at the Queensland Conservatorium, he performed the title role in the Australian premiere of Billy Budd. Other roles include:

- Enjolras in Les Misérables for the Wellington Operatic Society
- Major General Stanley in The Pirates of Penzance, the Boatswain in H.M.S. Pinafore, Danilo in The Merry Widow all for Essgee Melodies
- King Melchior in Amahl and the Night Visitors for the National Trust of Queensland
- Nardo in La finta giardiniera for the Brisbane Biennial
- Escamillo in Carmen for Lyric Opera 21, Belfast
- Marullo in Rigoletto for OzOpera
- Mathieu in Andrea Chénier and Belcore in L'elisir d'amore for the State Opera of South Australia
- Geoffrey in Lawrence Hargrave Flying Alone for the Sydney Symphony Orchestra
- Mamoud in John Adams' The Death of Klinghoffer for the New Zealand Symphony Orchestra
- Morales and Dancairo in Carmen, the title role of Don Giovanni (for which he won a National Opera Award), Eisenstein and Dr Falke in Die Fledermaus, Yamadori in Madama Butterfly, the title role of The Barber of Seville, Guglielmo in Così fan tutte, Papageno in The Magic Flute, Dandini in La Cenerentola, Christiano in Un ballo in maschera, Dr Malatesta in Don Pasquale, Schaunard in La bohème, Danilo in The Merry Widow, Bello in La fanciulla del West, Banjo Paterson in Waltzing Our Matilda (which he co-wrote and directed) and Mercutio in Roméo et Juliette: all for Opera Queensland.
- Created the roles of Julian in Quartet by Anthony Richie and Samuel in Electric Lenin by Barry Conyngham.

== Directing ==
Barry-Smith made his directorial debut at the 2001 4MBS Festival with Purcell's Dido and Aeneas in which he also sang the role of Æneas; this production won him the Perform 4MBS Award for Opera Production. Barry-Smith has worked as vocal coach and musical director of the Queensland Youth Choir. Together with Narelle French, Opera Queensland's Head of Music, Barry-Smith devised several touring productions for Opera Queensland, notably The Food of Love which ran for several years since 2004, and in 2009 Waltzing Our Matilda, co-written with his wife Leisa Barry-Smith. In 2008, he re-mounted Opera Queensland's production of Hansel and Gretel for its tour of 83 schools through Queensland and northern New South Wales.

He held the position of artistic director of the Queensland Youth Choir from 2008 until 2010, taught Musical Theatre/Voice at the University of Southern Queensland's Summer Schools from 2004 until 2014, classical voice at Queensland Conservatorium's Opera school from 2003 until 2013, and from 2009 until 2012 was the Director of Opera Queensland's Young and Developing Artist Program. From 2013 until 2014 he was the Creative Director of Opera Queensland's Open Stage program.

== Recordings ==
CD

- Something to Sing About (1985) with the Queensland Youth Choir
- Encore (1992) with Vocalpoint
- Smiley – The Musical, based on the 1945 novel for the 1956 film (2003) – Original Studio Recording
- Misa Criolla – Ariel Ramírez (2005) with the Queensland Youth Choir
- Songs of Inspiration (2007) ABC Classics 476 6159
- Colours of Christmas (2007) with the Queensland Youth Choir
- Portrait of Dorian Gray – John Wikman (2011) – Original studio recording

DVD

- The Pirates of Penzance (1994) ABC Video R-14653-9
- The Mikado (1996)
- H.M.S. Pinafore – Boatswain (1997)
