= Australian Singing Competition =

The Australian Singing Competition (ASC) evolved from the Marianne Mathy Scholarship, established in 1982 through a bequest made in the will of Marianne Mathy-Frisdane, a coloratura soprano opera singer and distinguished teacher of opera and classical singing.

The ASC rules and repertoire requirements are designed for young opera and classical singers, under 26 years of age. The competition is now recognised as one of the longest-running events of its kind, offering a range of scholarships, prizes, career and network opportunities, which also make the competition one of the richest in terms of financial and career opportunities available to recipients. Since 1982 the premier award of the competition has been the Marianne Mathy Scholarship, known by its participants and within its industry as "The Mathy".

Since 1998 the final concert of the competition has taken place in various capital cities around Australia, featuring many prominent conductors and some of Australia's leading orchestras.

The competition has had the patronage of several Governors-General of Australia, most recently David Hurley. In 2014 the ASC formally welcomed Haruhisa Handa as patron of the renamed IFAC Handa Australian Singing Competition in recognition of his ongoing sponsorship and support, both personally and as chairman of the International Foundation for Arts and Culture (IFAC).

The winner of the Opera Awards (Australia) is acknowledged and invited to perform as a guest artist at the finals concert of the IFAC Handa Australian Singing Competition.

The competition is widely regarded as the most prestigious opera competition in the Australasian region and is recognised within the opera community in Australia and internationally. Many finalists have successfully established their careers, with several going on to become influential artists both in Australia and abroad.

== Marianne Mathy Scholarship winners ("The Mathy") ==
Year	Scholarship winners	Category	National adjudicator
1982	Nicola Waite	soprano	Stefan Haag
1983	Jeffrey Black	baritone	Stefan Haag
1984	Miriam Gormley	soprano	Nance Grant
1985	David Lemke	baritone	Douglas Craig
1986	Fiona Janes	soprano	Jenifer Eddy
1987	Paul Whelan	bass	Elizabeth Fretwell
1988	Joanna Cole	soprano	Ronald Maconaghie / Margreta Elkins
1989	Clare Gormley	soprano	Margreta Elkins
1990	Christina Wilson	mezzo-soprano	Joseph Ward
1991	Stuart Skelton	tenor	Loh Siew-Tuan
1992	Jason Barry-Smith	baritone	Joseph Ward
1993	Amelia Farrugia	soprano	Myer Fredman
1994	David Quah	tenor	Joseph Ward
1995	Natalie Christie	soprano	Sharolyn Kimmorley
1996	Rebecca Nash	soprano	Patricia Price
1997	Alexandra Sherman	soprano	Eilene Hannan
1998	Goknur Shanal	soprano	Geoffrey Chard
1999	Janette Zilioli	soprano	Patricia Price
2000	Rachelle Durkin	soprano	Joseph Ward
2001	Rejielle Paulo	soprano	Robert Gard
2002	Katharine Tier	mezzo-soprano	Gregory Yurisich
2003	Jessica Pratt	soprano	Marilyn Richardson
2004	Emma Pearson	soprano	Glenys Fowles
2005	Anita Watson	soprano	Glenn Winslade
2006	Duncan Rock	baritone	Fiona Janes
2007	Emily Blanch	soprano	Anson Austin
2008	Sitiveni Talei	baritone	Deborah Riedel
2009	Sam Roberts-Smith	baritone	Donald Shanks
2010	Rachel Bate	soprano	Lisa Gasteen
2011	Emma Moore	soprano	Bernadette Cullen
2012	Anna Dowsley	mezzo-soprano	Jeffrey Black
2013	Jade Moffat	soprano	Emma Matthews
2014	Isabella Moore	soprano	Jeffrey Black
2015	Maximilian Riebl	countertenor	Linnhe Robertson
2016	Nicholas Tolput	countertenor	Lyndon Terracini
2017	Filipe Manu	tenor	Catrin Johnsson
2018	Zoe Drummond	soprano	Linnhe Robertson
2019	Manase Latu	tenor	Noëmi Nadelmann
2020	The regular competition was replaced for the year 2020 by ASC@Home in which singers submitted entries that had been recorded at home. The judges selected winners in four categories: classical and opera, musical theatre, contemporary (rock and pop), and jazz. Winners received a prize of US$1000.		
2021	not held		
2022	Jeremy Boulton	baritone	Graham Pushee
2023	Emmanuel Fonoti-Fumaono (New Zealand)	tenor	Patrick Togher
2024	Eden Shifroni	soprano	Natalie Aroyan
2025	Sidra Nissen	mezzo-soprano	Jeffrey Black
2026	Hannah Burton	soprano	

The IFAC Handa Australian Singing Competition is managed by Music & Opera Singers Trust Limited (MOST).
