= Althea Bridges =

Australian actor and opera singer

Althea Bridges (born 11 January 1936) is an opera singer (soprano) and music teacher. She lives in Austria.

== Life ==
Born in Sydney, Australia, Bridges studied at the Sydney Conservatorium of Music under Marianne Mathy, and during the early 1960s was part of the Elizabethan Trust Opera Company, under artistic director Stefan Hermann Haag.

She took part in singing contests in Sydney, with the intention of furthering her career overseas, and won the ABC Concerto and Vocal Competition in 1963.

After raising money to travel, in 1965 she visited Europe and won first prize in the Munich International Vocal Competition. The prize money and media appearances allowed her to remain in Europe, and she told her family she planned to stay indefinitely in Germany.

After making her debut at the Graz Opera in 1966, Bridges was engaged there until 1970, but also sang elsewhere. She toured Europe, and appeared in televised Opera recorded by the BBC. She sang in the world premiere of Prometheus at the Staatstheater Stuttgart, conducted by the composer Carl Orff.

She worked at the Linz State Theatre between 1970 and 2002, where she appeared in major opera roles under the artistic directors Alfred Stögmüller and Roman Zeilinger.

She has also appeared on many other stages, such as the Vienna State Opera, the Hamburg State Opera, the Oper Frankfurt, and the Glyndebourne Festival Opera.

Bridges retired at the end of the 2021/2002 season and made her last appearance as "Specki" in the Franzobel opera Weils Kind Schlaf will.

Aged 81, in 2016 Bridges performed a farewell concert with her son Sven Sorring and many of her music students to raise money for charity. She lives in Austria near Rottenegg.

== Awards ==
- 1965: First prize for singing at the ARD International Music Competition
- 2004: Mostdipf Prize
