= Fiona Janes =

Australian mezzo soprano and arts administrator

Fiona Janes (mezzo soprano)
- Born: 28 December 1964 (age 61); Sydney
- Occupations: Mezzo soprano & Arts Administrator
- Employer(s): Joan Sutherland & Richard Bonynge Foundation
- Known for: International opera singer and arts administrator

Fiona Janes (born in Sydney, Australia on 28 December 1964) is an international Australian mezzo-soprano and Arts Administrator.

== Early life and training ==
Educated at Killara High School and Pittwater High School in Sydney, she studied ballet and violin before taking up singing lessons privately at the age of 15 with Margaret Garrett and then Valerie Collins-Varga at the Sydney Conservatorium of Music.

She worked as a secretary for Chartered Accountants, Routley & Routley from 1982 to 1983 and then for Opera Australia from 1984 to 1987 in the artistic and marketing departments creating the company's photographic and audio visual archives. In 1986 she was awarded the George Sautelle Prize for outstanding potential, and came second in the 32nd Shell Aria contest at the Canberra School of Music. That same year she won "The Marianne Mathy" first prize at the Australian Singing Competition (ASC). Within a year she appeared in a radio concert with the Sydney Symphony Orchestra under David Agler, She spent 1987 in London, studying singing privately with Vida Harford and numerous vocal coaches before being asked to join Opera Australia's Young Artists' Programme in 1988. That year, she was one of eight artists chosen to perform highlights of opera and operetta in the Great Hall at the opening of the new Parliament House, Canberra.

She continued her vocal studies throughout her career working with such teachers and coaches as Sena Jurinac, György Fischer, Ernest St John Metz, Rita Loving and David Harper.

== Operatic career ==
Janes performed as a principal mezzo soprano from 1988 to 2014 throughout Australia, UK and Europe.

She made her principal role debut at Opera Australia as the understudy for Mercedes in Carmen at the age of 24, becoming one of the company's youngest principal singers. Her first official role was a few weeks later as Annio in Mozart's La Clemenza di Tito in the Sydney Opera House Concert Hall with Sir Christopher Hogwood conducting, also for Opera Australia. In the following years she played Cherubino in The Marriage of Figaro, and Dorabella in Così fan tutte to Yvonne Kenny's Fiordiligi.

Other roles for that company included Adalgisa in Norma opposite Elizabeth Connell, Angelina and Tisbe in La Cenerentola, Donna Elvira and Zerlina in Don Giovanni, Rosina in Il barbiere di Siviglia, Sesto in Giulio Cesare, Isabella in L'italiana in Algieri, Komponist in Ariadne auf Naxos, Annio and Sesto in La Clemenza di Tito, Lola in Cavalleria Rusticana, Mistress Quickly in Falstaff, Lake Lost with Baz Luhrmann, Whitsunday with Neil Armfeld and the roles Javotte in Manon, Kate Pinkerton in Madama Butterfly and Tessa in The Gondoliers. She appeared as a soloist in Opera Australia's Bellini Gala & New Year's Eve Gala with Simone Young, A New Year's Eve Gala with Richard Bonynge and the 50th Anniversary Gala in 2006.

Other performances have included: Siebel in Faust for Victoria State Opera and Opera Queensland, Nero in Agrippina at the Buxton Festival, U.K., Rosina for Netherlands Opera, English National Opera and Welsh National Opera, Second Lady in The Magic Flute and Meg in Falstaff for English National Opera, Sesto in La Clemenza di Tito for Glyndebourne Touring Opera, Bertarido in Rodelinda for Joan Sutherland & Richard Bonynge Foundation, Adalgisa in Norma for West Australian Opera, Idamante in Idomeneo for Flanders Philhamonic in Antwerp, Margherite in Damnation of Faust for Royal Scottish National Orchestra and Lyric Opera of Queensland, Ascanio in Les Troyens for London Symphony Orchestra with Sir Colin Davis, Angelina at the Semperoper Dresden and Opera New Zealand and Scitalce in Meyerbeer's Semiramide for the Rossini Festival in Germany with Richard Bonynge. She has also worked for the Royal Opera House Covent Garden on La Cenerentola and Il barbiere di Siviglia and Scottish Opera on Le nozze di Figaro.

Janes has sung in concert with the Sydney Symphony Orchestra, Melbourne Symphony Orchestra, Australian Chamber Orchestra, Adelaide Symphony, West Australian Symphony, Tasmanian Symphony, Queensland Symphony, Sydney Philharmonia Choirs, Royal Scottish National Orchestra, London Symphony Orchestra, the London, Flanders, Bournemouth and Nottingham Philharmonic Orchestras, the National Orchestra of Spain in Madrid, New Zealand Symphony, Opera North, Melbourne Chamber Orchestra, Huntington Estate and at the Edinburgh Festival with Sir Charles Mackerras. Her concert repertoire includes: Verdi's Requiem, Elgar's Dream of Gerontius, Mahler's Symphony No.2, Beethoven's 9th Symphony, Mass in C and Missa Solemnis, Mozart's Requiem, Rossini's Stabat Mater, Bach's St Matthew Passion, Schubert's Mass in A Flat and Mozart's Coronation Mass, Handel's L'Allegro il Penseroso ed il Moderato and Messiah, Berlioz' Roméo et Juliette and Stravinsky's Pulcinella. She has won multiple awards and made numerous recordings.

== Joan Sutherland & Richard Bonynge Foundation and Elizabeth Connell Scholarship Trust ==
In 2010, Janes became the CEO and Artistic Director and was a founding director of the Joan Sutherland & Richard Bonynge Foundation , a Sydney based charity that provides scholarships for young singers. She created of the Joan Sutherland & Richard Bonynge Bel Canto Award in 2011, one of Australia's major operatic singing competitions. In 2014, she created the Sydney International Song Prize to encourage Art Song in Australia. To date, the Foundation has awarded over $1million in scholarships to young musicians.

In 2012, she was asked by the South African soprano Elizabeth Connell, prior to her death, to create a scholarship in her name and to be a founding trustee for the Elizabeth Connell Scholarship Trust. Janes created the Elizabeth Connell International Singing Competition for Dramatic Sopranos in 2014 which was presented under the umbrella of the Joan Sutherland & Richard Bonynge Foundation. To date it has awarded over $450,000 to aspiring female singers.

She gives Masterclasses for young emerging singers and has been a judge for many of the major singing competitions throughout Australia including the Australian Singing Competition, Sydney Eisteddfod, Bathurst Eisteddfod and the Herald Sun Aria competition. She is the principal judge for the Joan Sutherland & Richard Bonynge Bel Canto Award and the Elizabeth Connell Prize.

In 2020, she wrote the Introduction and co-produced Richard Bonynge's book Chalet Monet: Inside the Home of Joan Sutherland & Richard Bonynge, published by Melbourne Books.

== Charity work ==
In 2004, she was invited to perform at Australia House in London for the Tate Memorial Trust, conducted by Richard Bonynge in the presence of H.R.H. The Prince of Wales and Duchess of Cornwell. Throughout her performing career she has performed in concert for numerous charities including for Opera Australia, Aids research, Deaf & Blind Charity and Children's Hospital, Joan Sutherland & Richard Bonynge Foundation, Opera & Arts Support Group, Tait Memorial Trust in London.

== Positions ==
- 1988 – 2007 Principal Artist with Opera Australia
- 1992 – 2014 Freelance Principal Opera Singer
- 2010 Founding Director of the Joan Sutherland & Richard Bonynge Foundation
- 2010 – present CEO and Artistic Director of the Joan Sutherland & Richard Bonynge Foundation
- 2012 Founding Trustee for the Elizabeth Connell Scholarship
- 2012 - present CEO and Artistic Director of the Elizabeth Connell Prize
- Member of Pacific Opera's Council of Patrons

== Awards ==
- 1983 Joan Sutherland Society Scholarship – Sydney Eisteddfod
- 1986 Australian Singing Competition Marianne Mathy Award
- 1991 Remy Martin Scholarship – Opera Australia
- 1995 Vienna State Opera Award – Opera Foundation Australia and Bull Fellowship.
- 1997 Victorian Green Room Award win and MO Award nomination for Angelina the title role in La Cenerentola – Opera Australia
- 1998 Victorian Green Room Award nomination for Rosina in Il barbiere di Siviglia – Opera Australia
- 2004 Victorian Green Room Award win and Helpmann Award nomination for Adalgisa in Norma – Opera Australia

== Recordings ==
- Rodelinda by G. F. Handel – Bertarido, conducted by Richard Bonynge (ABC Classics CD)
- Lurline by William Vincent Wallace – Ghiva, conducted by Richard Bonynge (Naxos CD)
- Semiramide by Meyerbeer – Scitalce, conducted by Richard Bonynge (Naxos CD)
- Così fan tutte by Mozart – Dorabella (Opera Australia DVD)
- Don Giovanni by Mozart – Zerlina (Opera Australia DVD)
- Verdi Requiem – mezzo-soprano soloist (Royal Melbourne Philharmonic CD)
- Beethoven 9th Symphony – mezzo-soprano soloist, conducted by Sir Charles Mackerras (Signum Classics)
- Parisina by Donizetti – soloist (Opera Rara CD)
- Pulcinella by Stravinsky – soloist (Naxos CD)
- 50th Anniversary Opera Australia Gala Concert – soloist (Opera Australia DVD)
- ABC/Opera Australia Mozart Bicentennial – soloist (Opera Australia/ABC CD)

== Publications ==
- Who's Who of International Music (listed)
- Contemporary Australian Women (listed)
- Who's Who of Australian Women (listed)
- Chalet Monet: Inside the Home of Dame Joan Sutherland & Richard Bonynge – Richard Bonynge (2020 Author of the introduction)
- Timing is Everything – Moffatt Oxenbould's Memoirs (mention)
- Choir Man – Jonathon Welch – (mention)
- Joan Sutherland My Favourites 2020 CD (Decca Article piece)
- Romantic French Arias Joan Sutherland CD (Decca Article piece)
