= Jeffrey Black =

Australian opera singer (born 1962)

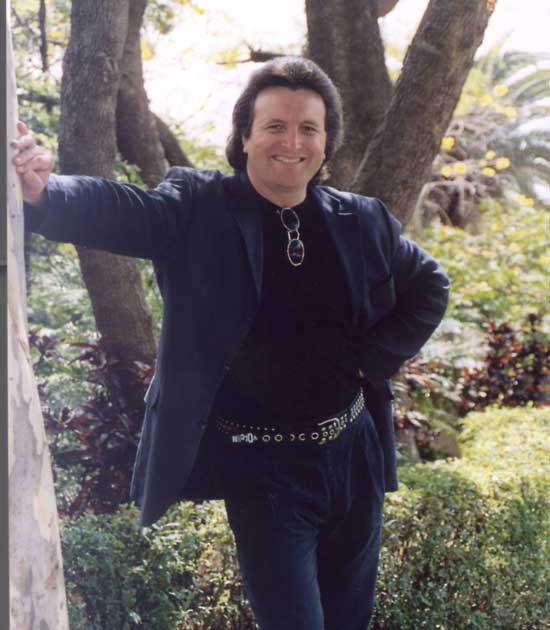
Jeffrey Black, 2004

Jeffrey Black (born 6 September 1962) is an Australian baritone who has had an active international performance career since the early 1980s. A frequent performer with Opera Australia and the Glyndebourne Festival Opera, he has performed leading role with the Metropolitan Opera, Opéra Bastille, Lyric Opera of Chicago, Bavarian State Opera, and the Royal Opera, Covent Garden, among other opera houses. He is particularly known for his portrayals of Guglielmo in Mozart's Così fan tutte, Count Almaviva in Mozart's The Marriage of Figaro, and Figaro in Rossini's The Barber of Seville.

== Early life and education ==
Born in Brisbane, Black was educated at Junction Park State School and the Anglican Church Grammar School. In his youth he was a boy soprano in the choir at the Cathedral of St Stephen, Brisbane, for several years. He studied singing at the Queensland Conservatorium of Music where graduated with a Bachelor of Music degree in 1983. At the Conservatorium he participated in opera workshops led by tenor Donald Smith whose influence oriented his career towards opera.

In 1983 Black won the Marianne Mathy Scholarship in the Australian Singing Competition which enabled him to pursue further vocal training at the National Opera Studio in London in 1984. In 1985 he was awarded the Armstrong-Martin Scholarship. He later pursued further vocal training with Audrey Langford and Jane Chapman in London.

== Performance career ==
Black began his professional career in the early 1980s as a concert baritone. He made his debut as a principal singer with the Opera Australia (OA) in 1984 as a featured soloist in a concert of works by Jean-Philippe Rameau at the Sydney Opera House. His first role in an opera with the OA was in 1985 as Mercutio in Charles Gounod's Roméo et Juliette. He notably performed the role of Nevers in Les Huguenots with OA in 1990 for the farewell performance of Joan Sutherland as Marguerite de Valois. He also performed and recorded the roles of Nerone and Ottone, both transposed down an octave from the original score, in Claudio Monteverdi's L'incoronazione di Poppea with the AO in 1988.

Black performed regularly at the Sydney Opera House with the OA for twenty years. His roles with that company included Papageno in Mozart's The Magic Flute (1986), Schaunard in Giacomo Puccini's La bohème (1986), Dr. Falke in Die Fledermaus (1986), Dandini in Rossini's La Cenerentola (1987), Figaro in The Barber of Seville (1989), Guglielmo in Così fan tutte (1990), Enrico in Donizetti's Lucia di Lammermoor (1996 and 2003), the title role of Pyotr Ilyich Tchaikovsky's Eugene Onegin (1997), Wolfram in Richard Wagner's Tannhäuser (1998) Rodrigo in Verdi's Don Carlo (1999), the Count in Richard Strauss's Capriccio (2000), Belcore in L'elisir d'amore (2001), Count Almaviva in The Marriage of Figaro (2002), and Danilo in The Merry Widow (2004). In 1991 he had a critical triumph with the OA in the title role of Mozart's Don Giovanni; later reprising the role with the company in 2003.

In 1986 Black made his first appearance in the United Kingdom with the Glyndebourne Festival Opera (GFO). He returned to the GFO numerous times, portraying such roles as Demetrius in Benjamin Britten's A Midsummer Night's Dream (1989), the Count in Richard Strauss's Capriccio (1990), and Count Almaviva in The Marriage of Figaro (1991). In 1987 he made his debut at the Royal Opera House, Covent Garden as Harlequin in Richard Strauss's Ariadne auf Naxos, and appeared at the Opera Queensland in Brisbane as Dandini in Rossini's La Cenerentola. He returned to Covent Garden as Sid in Britten's Albert Herring (1989), Figaro in Rossini's The Barber of Seville (1990), and Dandini in Rossini's La Cenerentola (1991).

Black made his first appearance in the United States as Guglielmo in Così fan tutte with the Los Angeles Opera in 1988; a role which he repeated at the Lyric Opera of Chicago (1993), the Salzburg Festival (1993), and the Aix-en-Provence Festival. In 1991 he made his debut at the Opéra Bastille in Paris as Lescaut in Puccini's Manon Lescaut. In 1992 he portrayed the Pirate King in Gilbert and Sullivan's The Pirates of Penzance with the Victoria State Opera. He performed the role of Fieramosca in Berlioz's Benvenuto Cellini at the Grand Théâtre de Genève in 1992, and returned there in 1995 as Riccardo in Bellini's I puritani.

In 1995 Black made his debut at the Metropolitan Opera in New York City as Figaro in The Barber of Seville; a role which he has also performed with the San Francisco Opera (1992), the San Diego Opera (1993), and the Bavarian State Opera (1995). In 1994 he returned to the San Diego Opera in the title role of Pyotr Ilyich Tchaikovsky's Eugene Onegin, appeared in Los Angeles as Marcello in La bohème', and performed the role of Demetrius in Britten's A Midsummer Night's Dream with the Israeli Opera.

In 2000 Black made his debut with the Michigan Opera Theatre as Captain Balstrode in Benjamin Britten's Peter Grimes. In 2004 he portrayed Escamillo in Opera Queensland's production of Georges Bizet's Carmen with Yvonne Fontane in the tile role. In 2005 he performed the role of Danilo in a staging celebrating the 100th anniversary of The Merry Widow with the Welsh National Opera.

In 2009 Black sang the title role in a concert version of Verdi's Simon Boccanegra with the Chelsea Opera Group at Queen Elizabeth Hall. That same year he performed the role of Frank in Die Fledermaus with the London Lyric Opera. In 2010 he portrayed Gianciotto in Riccardo Zandonai's Francesca da Rimini with Opera Holland Park.

Black has also performed in operas with the Dutch National Opera, Vlaamse Opera, Opéra de Monte-Carlo, Washington National Opera, Teatro Colón, and Opera North. His stage repertoire also included the role of Ford in Falstaff.

== Personal life ==
Black's son has diabetes, and he has been active in fundraising in support of this cause.
