= Opera Awards (Australia) =

The Opera Awards is an singing competition for professional Australian opera singers. It was established in 1986 with the purpose of assisting and developing professional Australian opera singers. This is achieved through programs of study with selected international educational institutions, engagements with professional opera companies, as well as through introduction, networking and educational opportunities with prominent members of the international operatic community.

The Opera Awards consists of a group of awards, including the Youth Music Foundation (YMF) Australia Award and the Armstrong-Martin Scholarship, amongst others. Major sponsors and supporters of the awards have included YMF Australia, the Armstrong-Martin Estate, Haas Foundation, The Glyndebourne Festival Opera (UK), the Royal Over-Seas League (UK) and the Australian Elizabethan Theatre Trust.

== History ==
In 1986/87, the Music & Opera Singers Trust (MOST) created the Opera Awards as a competition within the Australian SInging Competition, and then as a separate, stand-alone competition in 2001.

The competition provides cash prizes, scholarships and career opportunities to professional Australian opera singers, enabling the study of grand opera and related music overseas.

Since 2007, the primary award within the Opera Awards is the YMF Australia Award, sponsored by YMF Australia. The recipient of the Opera Awards receives a group of awards, scholarships and opportunities which include the YMF Australia Award, the Armstrong-Martin Scholarship, the Haas Foundation Award and the Editorial Resources Prize.

Runners-up receive prizes and opportunities which include (in 2011) The Royal Over-Seas League (UK) Music Bursary, the Britten-Pears Young Artists Programme, the Glyndebourne Festival Prize, and the 4MBS Classic FM Award.

The recipient of the Opera Awards (Australia) is acknowledged and invited to perform at the Finals Concert of the Australian Singing Competition.

== Recipients ==
Year	Opera Awards recipient (Note: The Opera Awards Recipient is defined as the individual who has received the major award within the Opera Awards. This has changed over the years: 1986–1997 (Armstrong-Martin Scholarship); 1998–2001 (Handa Scholarship and the Armstrong-Martin Scholarship); 2002–2006 (Armstrong-Martin Scholarship with the Australian Elizabeth Theatre Trust); 2007–2016 (YMF Australia Award and the Armstrong-Martin Scholarship).)	Category	Adjudicators (chair)
1986	Francesco Fabris	baritone	Jenifer Eddy
1987	Helen Adams	soprano	Elizabeth Fretwell
1988	Stephen Ibbotsen	tenor	Ronald Maconaghie, Margreta Elkins
1989	Lucas de Jong	baritone	Margreta Elkins
1990	Akiko Nakajima	soprano	Joseph Ward
1991	not awarded		
1992	Elisa Wilson	soprano	Joseph Ward
1993	Douglas McNichol	baritone	Joseph Ward
1994	Fiona Campbell	soprano	Stephen Barlow
1995	Ingrid Silveus	soprano	Myer Fredman
1996	Amelia Farrugia	soprano	Myer Fredman
1997	Donna-Marie Dunlop	soprano	Myer Fredman
1998	Jamie Allen	tenor	Myer Fredman
1999	Adrian McEniery	tenor	Roderick Brydon
2000	Han Lim	baritone	Andrew Greene
2001	Nicole Youl	soprano	Myer Fredman
2002	Hyeseoung Kwon	soprano	Vladimir Kamirsky
2003	not held		
2004	José Carbó	baritone	Richard Bonynge
2005	Tamsyn Stock-Stafford	soprano	Patrick Thomas
2006	Amy Wilkinson	soprano	Imre Palló
2007	James Homann	baritone	Vladimir Kamirsky
2008	Shane Lowrencev	bass	Richard Bonynge
2009	Emma Pearson	soprano	Jonathan Darlington
2010	Lorina Gore	soprano	Richard Bonynge
2011	Zara Barrett	soprano	Andrea Molino
2012	Nicole Car	soprano	Brian Castles-Onion
2014	Jonathan Abernethy	tenor	Greg Hocking
2017	Adrian Tamburini	bass-baritone	Simon Kenway
2019	Anna Dowsley	mezzo-soprano	Benjamin Northey
2023	Eleanor Greenwood	soprano	Dr Di Bresciani OAM
