= Helen Adams (soprano) =

Australian soprano (born 1956)

Helen Adams (born 29 September 1956) is an Australian soprano. She won the 1987 Australia Opera Awards.

== Life and career ==
Born in Geelong, Adams was trained of the Melbourne Conservatorium of Music at the University of Melbourne where she was a voice student of soprano Joan Hammond. After graduating from the Melbourne Conservatorium in 1982, she studied with Antonio Moretti-Pananti of the Victorian Opera. She later studied with Audrey Langford in England.

Adams made her professional opera debut in 1983 at the State Opera of South Australia as Pamina in Wolfgang Amadeus Mozart's The Magic Flute. She was a resident artist with that company for the next three years, appearing as Zerlina in Don Giovanni, Susanna in The Marriage of Figaro, and the title roles in Jules Massenet's Manon and Emmerich Kálmán's Grafin Mariza. In 1985 she was the soprano soloist in Johann Sebastian Bach's St Matthew Passion with the Canberra Choral Society at Llewellyn Hall.

In 1986, Adams made her debut with Opera Australia at the Sydney Opera House as Nanetta in Giuseppe Verdi's Falstaff; and remained a frequent artist with that company. One of the other roles she sang with Opera Australia included Gilda in Verdi's Rigoletto (1990).

In 1989, Adams gave her first performance in the United Kingdom at Queen Elizabeth Hall singing the title role in a concert performance of Donizetti's Anna Bolena. That same year she was a finalist in the BBC Cardiff Singer of the World competition. In 1991, she made her debut with the English National Opera as Donna Elvira in Don Giovanni. That same year she was a featured soloist at the Bath Mozartfest and toured Holland and Belgium in concerts.
