= Voiceworks =

Voiceworks may refer to:

- VoiceWorks (choir), an ensemble of the Queensland Youth Choir
- Voiceworks (magazine), an Australian literary journal for young writers
