= Jon Weaving =

Australian opera singer

Jon Weymouth Weaving (23 February 1931 – 19 October 2011) was an Australian opera singer, initially a bass-baritone but later a tenor.

== Early life and career ==
He was born on 23 February 1931 in the Melbourne suburb of Kew. This was the very day on which his great forebear Dame Nellie Melba died. His maternal cousin was the tenor Ken Neate. He studied singing with Jessye Schmidt and Browning Mummery before leaving for further studies in London with Dino Borgioli, Joan Cross, Herman Simberg, Audrey Langford, Andrew Field and Glyndebourne's Jani Strasser. During this time he also worked as a rehearsal singer with Sir Thomas Beecham for two years before his friend Richard Bonynge assisted enormously in developing a tenor voice from his former bass-baritone. After a further two years with Bonynge, Weaving was engaged by the Sadler's Wells Opera and made his debut as Danilo in The Merry Widow opposite June Bronhill at the London Coliseum, the first of many hundreds of performances of the role.

At Sadler's Wells Weaving also sang Lensky in Eugene Onegin, Alfredo in La traviata, and Roméo et Juliette opposite Elsie Morison, as well as other operetta appearances including Pluto in Orpheus in the Underworld, Raoul de Gardefeu in La Vie parisienne and Danilo, all of which were recorded by His Master's Voice at Abbey Road studios. In this time he made various recordings with the BBC, the first of which was as Eisenstein in Die Fledermaus direct from a stage performance at the Wells. He also sang again with June Bronhill when he appeared as Sir Walter Raleigh in Merrie England. In 1962, Jon began a tour of Australia and New Zealand for Sadler's Wells, which had become the English National Opera Company. During this time he starred in a weekly television series with Suzanne Steele, which ran on the ABC for three years. He sang with the All-State Symphony Orchestra during this period and on his third tour of New Zealand, directed and sang Frederick in The Pirates of Penzance at Her Majesty's Theatre in Auckland.

Returning to Europe in 1966 he was engaged by Benjamin Britten after many Covent Garden auditions for the role of MacHeath in Britten's adaptation of The Beggar's Opera and sang this role under the baton of Norman Del Mar in London, France and in Montreal at the World Expo in 1967. After study with Modesti in Paris he was engaged for his first Wagnerian role, Lohengrin, which he sang first at the Kiel Opera House in 1967. In Kiel, he went on to sing Herman in Tchaikovsky's The Queen of Spades, Otello, Andrea Chénier, Hoffman, Canio, Gounod's Faust, Don Jose, Florestan, Macduff in Macbeth etc., as well as singing classical operetta roles such as Sou Chong in The Land of Smiles, Danilo in The Merry Widow, The Count of Luxembourg and The Gypsy Baron. He also created roles in four world premieres during this time and later Rashomon for the Olympic Games in Munich. He was constantly offered Wagnerian roles and finally agreed to sing Siegmund under the baton of Hans Zender and Klaus Tennstedt. This was a success and was followed by Loge in Das Rheingold and Erik in The Flying Dutchman. During this time in Kiel he guested all over Europe and returned to London for performances of Pluto in Orpheus in the Underworld and Bacchus in Ariadne auf Naxos under Sir Charles Mackerras. He made numerous television appearances during this time also e.g. The Phil Silvers Show, where he sang arias and appeared in a duet with his former idol, Sergeant Bilko. He made his debut at the Bavarian State Opera, Munich as Dimitri in Boris Godunov under Rafael Kubelík and then returned to Australia for concerts and a recording of Malcolm Williamson's The Violins of Saint-Jacques with the Sydney Symphony Orchestra, which was also released on video. Returning to Europe he finally decided to accept offers to sing both Siegfrieds and sang his first Ring in London under the batons of Sir Charles Mackerras and Sir Reginald Goodall. His first German Ring was in Wiesbaden and he was offered numerous contracts to sing the two roles in Italy, Germany, Switzerland and France. He continued every year to sing the Siegfrieds and Siegmund in the famous English Ring in London and went on to create the Siegfrieds in the Herz Ring in Wagner's birthplace, Leipzig. He sang in this famous production for several seasons before deciding to take his family back to Australia, where he was to sing a recital tour with Geoffrey Parsons, record two albums and sing numerous concerts for the ABC throughout Australia. He sang Siegmund and Siegfried for the Australian Opera, again under Sir Charles Mackerras and performed Die Walküre with both Hiroyuki Iwaki and Leif Segerstam. With his wife, the Swedish soprano Monique Brynnel, he made a television series and appeared in numerous concerts and sang with her in seasons with the Victorian and Queensland Opera companies. He lived in Kew in Melbourne and made a career teaching singing privately, having numerous successful students enter the opera world. He had two sons; Jon (b. 1955 to first wife soprano Margaret Nisbett) and Jack (b. 1974).

Jon was offered numerous film roles, the highlight of which was to be invited to Rome by Federico Fellini to screen test for the lead in Fellini's Casanova. This he declined in order to continue his operatic career. He had many very successful singing students.

In May 2011, Jon Weaving and Monique Brynnel emigrated from Australia to Sweden. They established a singing school in their new home town. Jon Weaving died of pancreatic cancer in Sweden on 19 October 2011, aged 80.

== Sources ==
- The Age, "Operetta Team Back for a New Series", 22 October 1964, p. 3
- Kelly, Frances, "Merry Widow Met her Match" The Sun-Herald, 2 September 1973, p. 78
- Vincent, Peter (12 July 2006). "Put a song in your heart". Sydney Morning Herald.
