= Oxenbould =

Oxenbould is an English surname which derives from the Anglo-Saxon given name Osƿeald from os 'god' and ƿeald 'rule', god is my ruler. This name was an Early form of the English given name Oswald or the Old Norse form Ásvaldr. Notable people with the surname include:

- Ben Oxenbould (born 1969), Australian actor and comedian
- Ed Oxenbould (born 2001), Australian actor, nephew of Ben
- Moffatt Oxenbould (born 1943), Australian opera director
