= Amelia Farrugia =

Australian opera singer

- Born: 28 July 1970 (age 56); Sydney, Australia
- Occupation: Opera singer (soprano)
- Website: ameliafarrugia.com

←

Amelia Farrugia (often misspelled as Ferrugia; born 28 July 1970) is an Australian soprano opera singer of Maltese descent. She won awards in the Sydney Eisteddfod and the 1996 Australian Singing Competition, and the 1995 Metropolitan Opera National Council Auditions in New York where she covered leading roles at the Metropolitan Opera in 2012 and 2015. She was a finalist at the Neue Stimmen competition in Germany in 2001.

Born in Sydney, Farrugia, attended Loreto Kirribilli and then studied at the Sydney Conservatorium of Music, graduating in 1992. After winning awards in such events as the Sydney Eisteddfod and the Australian Singing Competition, she started performing with Opera Australia, first performing lead roles in 1994. She earned a nomination for the 2006 ARIA Award for Aria Best Classical Album for her solo album Joie de vivre!.

Farrugia sang the title role in Opera Australia's 2010 staging of Giles Havergal's production of The Merry Widow opposite David Hobson's Danilo. She sang Cunegonde, again opposite Hobson, in Lindy Hume's production of Bernstein's Candide for Opera Queensland in 2015.

== Discography ==
=== Albums ===
List of albums, with selected details
Title	Details
Joie de vivre!	Released: 2005; Format: CD; Label: Decca (9875237)

== Awards and nominations ==
=== ARIA Music Awards ===
The ARIA Music Awards is an annual awards ceremony that recognises excellence, innovation, and achievement across all genres of Australian music. They commenced in 1987.

Year	Nominee / work	Award	Result	Ref.
2006	Joie De Vivre	Best Classical Album	Nominated	
