= Meribeth Dayme =

Meribeth (Bunch) Dayme (April 20, 1938 – October 28, 2019) was an internationally known voice consultant/strategist, speaker, author, and founder of CoreSinging®.

== Early life and education ==
Meribeth Bunch studied vocal performance at Salem College, Winston-Salem, North Carolina (1960) and studied for a Masters at Union Theological Seminary, New York, New York. She received her PhD in Music at the University of Southern California, Los Angeles, California.

In 1979, she was awarded a National Institutes of Health post-doctoral fellowship to conduct research on the voice at the Royal College of Surgeons of London, London, England. She studied voice with Audrey Langford in London.

== Teacher and author ==
Dayme was an instructor teaching Singing in the School of Music and Anatomy in the Dental School at the University of Southern California (1968-1974). While there, she studied singing and pedagogy with William Vennard. In 1974, she began teaching at the University of Delaware, where she had a joint appointment as Associate Professor in the Department of Music and in the School of Life and Health Sciences (1974-1982) Her first book, Dynamics of the Singing Voice, was published in 1982. It became popular for use as text in many university music departments around the world and as a resource for other authors. She wrote The Performer's Voice, which further established her authority in the field of the singing voice.

In 2004, her book The Singing Book, with co-author Cynthia Vaughn, was published and the 3rd edition, released in February 2014.

Articles by Dayme have been published in refereed professional journals, such as The Journal of Voice, The Journal of Singing, Folia Phoniatrica, and online magazines Operagasm, and The Musical Theatre Magazine.

== Later life ==
In 2004, Dayme moved from London to the French Alps, near Lake Annecy, France. In 2010, she founded Alchemy Programmes Sarl, in Geneva, Switzerland. CoreSinging was founded in 2009. In 2016 she relocated to Rancho Santa Fe, California, where she lived until her death on October 28, 2019 at the age of 81.

CoreSinging® is an approach to vocal teaching and singing. It incorporates eastern concepts and practices taken from Qigong and Taichi and studies in consciousness, traditional western vocal practices, and Meribeth Dayme's teaching experience in a holistic and energy-based approach to vocal training, with focus on energy, awareness, imagination, practice, and performance. Before her death on October 28, 2019 in Rancho Santa Fe, California, she consulted for companies and individuals on presentation and speaking, taught CoreSinging® courses and gave lectures and workshops for schools, organizations and private companies.

== Honors ==
- Van Lawrence Fellowship, Philadelphia, Pennsylvania 2001
- Human Communication International Communications Award 2000
- National Institutes of Health Post-Doctoral Fellow 1979-81
- Listed in Outstanding Young Women in America 1968

== Bibliography ==
- Dayme, Meribeth (5th ed. 2009). Dynamics of the Singing Voice. Springer-Verlag Publishers. ISBN 978-3-211-88729-5
- Dayme, Meribeth (2006). The Performer's Voice. WW Norton Publishers. ISBN 978-0-393-97993-0
- Dayme, Meribeth and C. Vaughn (3rd ed. 2014). The Singing Book. WW Norton Publishers. ISBN 978-0-393-92025-3
- Dayme, Meribeth (2012). Presence, Confidence and Personal Power. E-book, self-published. ISBN 978-0-9534752-1-6
- Bunch, Meribeth (1989). Speak with Confidence. Kogan Page Ltd. ISBN 978-1-85091-823-3
- Dayme, Meribeth (2006). The Little Book About the Voice. FC Cake Publishing, E-book
