= Jack Gleeson (television executive) =

Australian television executive

Jack Gleeson AM KSG
- Born: 12 July 1922; Warwick, Queensland, Australia
- Died: 30 January 2018 (aged 95); Townsville, Queensland, Australia
- Occupation(s): television and radio executive
- Known for: bringing television to North Queensland
- Awards: Queensland Great (2015)

John Fredolin Gleeson AM KSG (12 July 1922 – 30 January 2018) was an Australian television executive.

Gleeson had an extensive career in the radio and television industry but is perhaps best known for his lengthy tenure as chairman of Telecasters North Queensland, of which he was also a major shareholder.

In this position, he is credited with introducing the first television service to Northern Australia with the inauguration of the first television station north of Brisbane in 1962.

== Life and career ==
Gleeson commenced his career working as a technician before buying radio station 4AY in the 1950s.

Gleeson then moved into television, becoming chairman of Telecasters North Queensland which saw Townsville become the first city north of Brisbane to receive television with the launch of TNQ-7 on 1 November 1962. Telecasters North Queensland then purchased Cairns station FNQ-10 with both stations sharing a programming schedule and sharing the name NQTV.

Gleeson saw NQTV through aggregation which saw the station change its name to QTV and expand into southern areas of regional Queensland. However, a tense battle with the Nine Network ensued with Telecasters North Queensland attempting to secure an affiliation agreement to have Nine's programs broadcast on QTV.

Despite promising negotiations with Kerry Packer which saw QTV begin to promote Nine's programs on air, Gleeson ultimately lost out when Packer terminated an agreement with Telecasters North Queensland on 24 December 1990, just days before aggregation commenced.

QTV was forced to enter a quick supply agreement to secure a Network Ten affiliation instead. Although disappointed by Nine's decision to pull out of the deal they had made with QTV, Gleeson described the arrangement with Network Ten as "satisfactory" citing the network's improved ratings nationally which he believed would enhance QTV's future.

Gleeson died on 30 January 2018 at the age of 95. His funeral service was held at the Sacred Heart Cathedral in Townsville on 5 February 2018.

== Honours ==
In the 1985 Australia Day Honours, Gleeson was made a Member of the Order of Australia in recognition of his service to the Australian radio and television industry.

He was conferred with an honorary doctorate from the Australian Catholic University in 2005.

Gleeson was named as a Queensland Great in 2015.

In 2006, he was awarded a papal knighthood in the Order of St. Gregory the Great by Pope Benedict XVI.
