= Audrey Langford =

British soprano, conductor and voice teacher

Audrey Langford (28 June 1912, Rochdale — 5 August 1994, Bromley) was an English soprano, conductor, and voice teacher. Musicologist Elizabeth Forbes wrote, "Audrey Langford will no doubt go down in musical history as a superb singing teacher over a period of 50 years, but she also had two other successful careers, as a soprano who sang at Covent Garden in the late 1930s and, after the war, as a conductor, most particularly of the Bromley Philharmonic Choir and the Kentish Opera Group, both of which organizations she founded."

== Life and career ==
Born in Rochdale, Greater Manchester, Langford earned degrees in piano and voice from the Royal College of Music. She was committed to the Royal Opera House, Covent Garden under Sir Thomas Beecham where she performed mainly in comprimario roles from 1936 through 1939. Some of the roles she performed at that opera house included Madeleine in Louise (1936) a Flower Maiden in Parsifal (1936, 1937, and 1939), and the Dew Fairy in Hansel and Gretel (1937).

After opera ceased at that theatre with the outbreak of World War II, Langford spent the war years performing as a member of the Entertainments National Service Association. A perforated ear drum ended her performance career shortly after the end of war, and she then began a long distinguished career as a voice teacher which lasted more than five decades. In addition to teaching privately out of the Cantica Voice Studio in Bromley, Langford was a member of the voice faculty at the Royal Northern College of Music and taught masterclasses internationally.

Langford also had a career as a professional conductor. She notably founded and directed both the Bromley Philharmonic Choir and the Kentish Opera Group. With the latter organization she conducted the United Kingdom premieres of two operas by Gian Carlo Menotti: The Old Maid and the Thief on July 14, 1960, and The Saint of Bleecker Street on July 27, 1962. In 1974 she conducted the Bromley Philharmonic Choir and Handel Chamber Orchestra at Queen Elizabeth Hall for a recording of Jules Massenet's Marie-Magdeleine. She was also David Parry's first conducting teacher.

Langford was also a guest conductor with the Scottish Opera; conducting performances of Handel's Partenope (1964) and Bastien und Bastienne (1966).

== Personal life and death ==
Langford's first husband was violist Frederick Riddle. In 1949 she married bass-baritone Andrew Field. Her daughters are mezzo-soprano Sally Langford-Broadley (also known professionally as Elizabeth Langford) and Anne Langford. She died in Bromley on 5 August 1994.

== Pupils ==
The following singers studied voice with Langford:

- Helen Adams
- Richard Warner Best
- Susan Bickley
- Jeffrey Black
- Christine Bunning
- Meribeth (Bunch) Dayme
- Elisabeth Erikson
- Helen Gasztowt-Adams
- Sheri Greenawald
- Hugh Hetherington
- Martyn Hill
- Ann Hood
- Richard Jackson
- Janis Kelly
- Dorothy Maddison
- Maureen Morelle
- Arwel Huw Morgan
- Josephine Nendick
- Joan Rodgers
- Ghillian Sullivan
- Torhild Staahlen
- Josephine Veasey
- David Wakeman
- Jon Weaving

== Bibliography ==
- J. P. Wearing (2014). The London Stage 1930-1939: A Calendar of Productions, Performers, and Personnel. Rowman & Littlefield. ISBN 9780810893047.
