= Joan Rodgers =

English operatic soprano

Joan Rodgers C.B.E. (born 4 November 1956 in Cleator Moor, Cumbria, England) is an English operatic soprano.

== Early life ==
She attended Whitehaven Grammar School, gaining French, German and Russian A-levels.

She read Russian at the University of Liverpool and studied at the RNCM. She studied singing with Audrey Langford.

== Career ==
She made her professional opera debut at the Aix-en-Provence Festival in 1982 as Pamina in Mozart's The Magic Flute; a role she later sang for her debut at the Metropolitan Opera in New York in 1995. In 1983 she made her debut at the English National Opera as the Wood Nymph in Rusalka, and performed for the first time at the Royal Opera House as the princess in L'enfant et les sortilèges. She made her debut at the Glyndebourne Festival Opera in 1989 as Susanna in Mozart's The Marriage of Figaro.

== Personal life ==
She was married to the conductor Paul Daniel, and married Alan Samson in 2013.

She was created a CBE in 2001.
