= Torhild Staahlen =

Norwegian operatic mezzo-soprano (1947–2021)

Torhild Staahlen (25 September 1947 – 17 December 2021) was a Norwegian operatic mezzo-soprano who was employed at Norwegian National Opera from 1967 to 1969 and from 1971 to 2000. She had her solo debut as Suzuki in Madam Butterfly with The Norwegian National Opera in Oslo in 1971.

Staahlen was born in Skien Norway on 25 September 1947. She studied at Oslo Conservatory of Music and graduated from the Norwegian College of Opera in Oslo in 1971. She was a pupil of Audrey Langford in London. She also studied with famous opera singers, including Astrid Varnay, Ingrid Bjoner and Aase Nordmo Løvberg.

She sang in more than sixty roles, including the title role in Carmen in three productions, Octavian in Der Rosenkavalier, Azucena in Il trovatore, Amneris in Aida and Ulrica in Un ballo in maschera.

Staahlen sang in Sweden, Denmark, Finland, Germany, Scotland, England and the United States, and performed many oratorios and concerts. She also sang on radio and television. Her repertoire of more than twenty works included Bach's Mass in B Minor, Händel’s Messiah, Brahms’ Alto Rhapsody, Beethoven’s 9th Symphony and Elgar’s Sea Pictures.

She established her own scholarship for singers, musicians and composers. It was awarded for the first time on 17 May 1997. She was married to the Scottish musician Neil David Percival Dodd (1939–2005), who was first répétiteur and conductor on The Norwegian National Opera.

Staahlen later moved back to Skien, and was partnered to Steinar Syverud. She died on 17 December 2021, at the age of 74.

== Sources ==
- International Who's Who in Classical Music, pp 746, David M. Cummings, Europa Publications, 2003, ISBN 1-85743-174-X
- Cappelens Musikkleksikon, Vol. 6, pp 213, J.W Cappelens Forlag as, 1980, ISBN 82-02-03689-5 (A Norwegian Music Dictionary)
- Maud Hurum's Opera Survey (In Norwegian)
- Aase Nordmo Løvberg on Norwegian Wikipedia.
