= 1985 Australia Day Honours =

The 1985 Australia Day Honours were announced on 26 January 1985 by the Governor General of Australia, Sir Ninian Stephen.

The Australia Day Honours are the first of the two major annual honours lists, announced on Australia Day (26 January), with the other being the Queen's Birthday Honours which are announced on the second Monday in June.

== Order of Australia ==
Order of Australia (Civil) ribbon

Order of Australia (Military) ribbon

=== Companion of the Order of Australia (AC) ===
| Recipient | Citation | Notes |
|---|---|---|
| Peter Graham Faithfull Henderson | For distinguished public service, particularly as Secretary to the Department of Foreign Affairs. | |
| The Honourable Sir Richard Clarence Kirby | For distinguished service to the advertising industry in Australia and to the Herbert Vere Evatt Memorial Foundation. | |
| The Honourable Charles Leycester Devenish Meares | For distinguished public service to the Australian honours system and for continued distinguished service in the field of social welfare. | |
| Lloyd Frederic Rees CMG | For distinguished service to the arts in Australia, particularly in the field of landscape painting. | |

=== Officer of the Order of Australia (AO) ===
==== General Division ====
| Recipient | Citation | Notes |
|---|---|---|
| Cecil Roy Abbott QPM | For public service, particularly with the NSW Police Force. | |
| Ronald Moore Bannerman | For public service, particularly as Commissioner of Trade Practices and chairman of the Trade Practices Commission. | |
| Dr Harold Felix Bell OBE | For service to commerce and for public service. | |
| Joseph Brender | For service to secondary industry and the community. | |
| Keith Frederick Brigden | For public service, particularly with the Australian Taxation Office and as Commonwealth Auditor General. | |
| Desmond Eoghan Byrne | For public service and for service to the community. | |
| Michael John Maxwell | For service to the arts, particularly to the Art Gallery of South Australia. | |
| Verner Thomas Christie | For service to the banking industry. | |
| Professor Gerard William Crock | For service to medicine, particularly in the field of ophthalmology. | |
| Alan Woodhouse Crompton | For service to industry and to the community. | |
| John Geoffrey Donaldson | For service to the petroleum industry. | |
| Graham Barton Feakes | For public service as a diplomatic representative and in the development of Australian relations with South and South-East Asia. | |
| Laurie John Ferguson | For service to government and to the NSW Parliament. | |
| John Charles Finemore OBE | For public service as Chief Parliamentary Counsel for Victoria. | |
| Dr Peter Ian Alexander Hendry | For service to medicine. | |
| Dr Ursula Hoff OBE | For service to the arts, particularly to art scholarship in Australia. | |
| James Frank Kirk | For service to industry, particularly to the development of Australia's natural resources. | |
| James Bruce Kirkwood | For public service, particularly as foundation chairman of the National Energy Research Development and Demonstration Council. | |
| William David McPherson | For service to industry and to the community. | |
| Victor Eadric Martin | For service to the banking industry, particularly as chairman of the Committee of Review of the Australian Financial System. | |
| Emeritus Professor Robert George Neale | For public service, particularly as Director General of the Australian Archives. | |
| Julius Lockington Patching OBE | For service to sport, particularly as secretary general of the Australian Olympic Federation. | |
| Clifton Ernest Pugh | For service to Australian art. | |
| Professor Keith Val Sinclair | For service to education, particularly the study of modern languages. | |
| Professor Robert Street | For service to learning, particularly as Vice Chancellor of the University of Western Australia. | |
| Professor Graham Douglas Tracy | For service to medicine, particularly in the field of surgery. | |
| Reginald Frank William CMG | For service to commerce and to the community. | |
| Alan John Woods | For public service, particularly as Secretary to the Department of Resources and Energy. | |

==== Military Division ====
| Branch | Recipient | Citation | Notes |
|---|---|---|---|
| Navy | Rear Admiral David James Martin | For service as the Chief of Naval Personnel and Flag Officer Naval Support Command. | |
| Navy | Rear Admiral Brian Tremayne | For service as the Director-General of Naval Health Services and chairman of the Services Health Policy Committee. | |
| Army | Major-General Kevin George Cooke | For service to the Army Reserve, particularly as Commander, 3rd Division. | |
| Army | Major-General Kenneth Joseph Taylor | For service to the Australian Army, particularly as Chief of Materiel. | |
| Air Force | Air Vice-Marshal Billie Hicks Collings | For service to the Royal Australian Air Force, particularly as Air Officer Commanding Support Command. | |

=== Member of the Order of Australia (AM) ===
==== General Division ====
| Recipient | Citation | Notes |
|---|---|---|
| Judith Alison Adam | For service to the community health, particularly to the Royal Women's Hospital, Victoria. | |
| Professor John Stuart Allman | For service to science, particularly surveying and mapping. | |
| John Rushworth Anderson | For service to the avocado industry. | |
| Dr William Arthur Barclay | For service to medicine, particularly in the field of psychiatry. | |
| Bryan William Birch | For public service, particularly to the ACT Electricity Authority. | |
| Arnold Bloch | For service to the Jewish community in Australia. | |
| Anthony Bonnici | For service to the Maltese community in Australia. | |
| Sonia Ingeborg Borg (Mrs Fankhanel) | For service to the film and television industry. | |
| The Reverend Dr Lewis Arnold Born | For service to religion and to the community, particularly in the field of youth affairs. | |
| Joan Brewer | For service to library education. | |
| Colin Hordern Bull | For service to manufacturing industry. | |
| Robert Marshall Cameron | For service to the community. | |
| Alan Henry Cash | For service to education and to the community. | |
| Alfred Thomas Speakman Clarke RFD ED | For service to the welfare of ex-service personnel. | |
| Peter John Davidson | For service to secondary industry and commerce, particularly in the field of accountancy. | |
| Jack Leonard Davis BEM | For service to Aboriginal literature and theatre. | |
| Dr David Denham | For service to seismology. | |
| William Edward Leembruggen de Vos | For service to the pastoral industry of the Northern Territory. | |
| Dr Peter David Drysdale | For service to international relations and trade. | |
| Paul Bruce Free | For public service in the field of science and technology. | |
| Dr William John Garrett | For service to medicine, particularly the science of obstetric ultrasound. | |
| Emeritus Professor Martin Fritz Glaessner | For service to geology, particularly micropalaeontology. | |
| John Fredolin Gleeson | For service to the radio and television industry. | |
| Albert Jaime Grassby | For service to community relations. | |
| Barry Joseph Grear | For service to the community, particularly through administering natural-disaster relief. | |
| Neville Bruce Gruzman | For service to architecture. | |
| Clive Arthur Hamer | For service to education, particularly as headmaster of Wesley College, Perth. | |
| Eric Herbert Hanfield | For public service, particularly as Administrator of the Cocos (Keeling) Islands. | |
| Clarence Lindsay Hermes | For services to youth in the ACT. | |
| James Hickey | For public service, particularly in the field of Commonwealth-State relations. | |
| William John Hoffmann | For service to the Olympic Federation as competitor and official, particularly as general manager of the 1984 Australian Olympic Team. | |
| Irene Faith Hooper | For service to the Country Women's Association. | |
| William Howard-Smith | For service to the Australian shipping industry. | |
| Professor Dharmasoka Laksiri Jayasuriya | For service to community relations. | |
| William James Job | For service to the community. | |
| Jeffry Joynton-Smith | For service to the performing arts. | |
| Dr Alice Hazel Kelso King | For service to the study of Australian history. | |
| Rollo Kingsford-Smith DSO DFC | For service to the Australian aviation industry. | |
| Dr James Wilfred Knight | For service to industry, particularly in the field of food research. | |
| Gilles Thomas Kryger | For service to commerce. | |
| Dr John Charles Lane | For service to aviation medicine and to road-safety standards. | |
| Peter Stroud Langford | For service to air-safety standards. | |
| Alfred Lionel Lazer | For service to athletics. | |
| Judge John Francis Lincoln | For service to the community, particularly in the field of prisoner rehabilitation. | |
| Kaye Elizabeth Loder | For service to the community, particularly in the field of women's affairs. | |
| Robert Henry Luke | For service to bushfire prevention and control. | |
| Noel Lynagh | For public service to the Northern Territory. | |
| Hugh George McCredie | For service to sport in Australian universities. | |
| Walter Patrick McGrath | For service in drug rehabilitation, particularly through Odyssey House. | |
| Margaret Grace McNair | For service to nursing. | |
| Hector Iain Munro MacFarlane | For service to religion. | |
| John Thomas Maher | For public service to Queensland. | |
| Dr Ernest Cosmo Manea | For service to the community of Bunbury and to local government. | |
| Raymond David Marginson | For service to university administration. | |
| Dr Giorgio Masero | For service to the Italian community in Australia. | |
| Graeme William Matthews | For service to the finance industry, particularly in the development of new technology. | |
| John Peter Maynes | For service to the trade-union movement. | |
| Richard Graham Meale MBE | For service to music. | |
| Patrick Dalgety Moore | For service to the wool industry. | |
| Frank Thomas Moorhouse | For service to Australian literature. | |
| Cr Bernard Anthony Mullane MBE | For service to the community of Baulkham Hills Shire. | |
| Gerald Anthony Murphy | For service to the legal profession. | |
| John Robert Neil | For service to the Returned Services League. | |
| Donald Geoffrey Neilson | For service to accountancy. | |
| Phyllis Margaret Newnham | For service to nursing. | |
| Dr Thomas Henry O'Donnell | For service to medicine, particularly in the field of otolaryngology. | |
| Moffatt Benjamin Oxenbould | For service to opera. | |
| Mahla Liane Pearlman | For service to the legal profession, particularly the NSW Law Society. | |
| Gail Gordon Radford | For service to women's affairs, particularly in the Equal Employment Opportunity Bureau. | |
| Emeritus Professor Tyndale John Rendle-Short | For service to medicine, particularly in the field of child health. | |
| Myra Ellen Roper | For service to international relations. | |
| Peter Frederick Rushforth | For service to the ceramic arts, particularly pottery. | |
| Charles Richard Rye | For public service, particularly in the field of economic policy. | |
| Colin Howard Sandison | For service to the community, particularly in the control of anaesthetic-gas contamination in hospital operating theatres. | |
| Reuben Francis Scarf OBE | For service to the community and to philanthropic organisations. | |
| James Edward Schofield | For public service to the aviation industry in Australia and Papua New Guinea. | |
| David Herbert Standen | For service to the development of uniform practice standards in architecture. | |
| Leonard Buttell Swinden | For service to hospital administration. | |
| Dr Joseph Julius Hubert Szent-Ivany | For service to science, particularly in the field of entomology in Australia and the South Pacific. | |
| Stephen Walker | For service to sculpture. | |
| Francis John Waters | For service to the trade-union movement. | |
| Dr Arthur Farquhar Webster | For service to veterinary science. | |
| Morris Langlo West | For service to literature. | |
| Neil Malcolm Westaway | For service to the Scout Association of Australia. | |
| Dr Henry Norman Burgess Wettenhall | For service to the community, particularly in the field of natural history. | |
| Richard Norman Wheeler | For service to commerce and the community. | |
| James Galarrwuy Yunupingu | For service to the Aboriginal community. | |

==== Military Division ====
| Branch | Recipient | Citation | Notes |
|---|---|---|---|
| Navy | Rear-Admiral Ian McLean Crawford | For service as the Director-General of Supply, Navy. | |
| Navy | Principal Chaplain John Elliot Jones | For service as Fleet Command Chaplain. | |
| Navy | Lieutenant-Commander Terence John Makings | For service as the Marine Engineering Officer of HMAS Stuart. | |
| Navy | Commodore Malcolm Steward Unwin | For service as Commanding Officer, HMAS Stalwart. | |
| Army | Colonel John Edward Colvin RFD ED | For service to the Army Reserve in NSW. | |
| Army | Lieutenant-Colonel Peter John Cosgrove MC | For service as Commanding Officer, 1st Battalion, Royal Australian Regiment. | |
| Army | Major Ronald James Crewe | For service with the Australian Defence Staff, Papua New Guinea. | |
| Army | Colonel Maxwell John Lemon | For service in Joint Communications Electronics Branch. | |
| Army | Major Donald John Lynch | For service to the Royal Australian Infantry Corps. | |
| Army | Major Kathryn Ann McQuarie | For service to the Royal Australian Corps of Transport. | |
| Army | Colonel Ian Charles Miller | For service as Director of Medical Services, 5th Military District. | |
| Army | Lieutenant-Colonel Christopher Andrew MacDonald | For service as Commanding Officer, Special Air Services Regiment. | |
| Army | Colonel John Murray Sanderson | For service as Director of Plans, Army Office. | |
| Army | Lieutenant-Colonel Brook Ellery Powell Thorpe | For service as Officer Commanding 18 Field Squadron (Light), Royal Australian Engineers. | |
| Air Force | Squadron Leader Margaret Joy Hine | For service to the Royal Australian Air Force Nursing Service. | |
| Air Force | Squadron Leader Stephen Thomas Low | For service in the field of flying safety. | |
| Air Force | Wing Commander Daniel Lawrence MacFarlane | For service as the Staff Officer Control and Reporting, Air Force Office. | |
| Air Force | Wing Commander Christopher Laurie Mills | For service to Resources Management Branch, Air Force Office. | |
| Air Force | Wing Commander William Norton Robertson DFC | For service as Commanding Officer, No 5 Squadron, RAAF. | |
| Air Force | Air Commodore Stuart Sutton Noel Watson | For service as Officer Commanding RAAF Richmond. | |

=== Medal of the Order of Australia (OAM) ===
==== General Division ====
| Recipient | Citation | Notes |
|---|---|---|
| Cyril Charles Adams MBE | For service to local government and to the community. | |
| Charles Arthur Allen | For service to local government and to the community | |
| Kenneth Baguley | For service to the community | |
| Eric Henry Ivo Baldwin | For service to the community | |
| Dr Warwick Carl Bateman | For service to the community | |
| Robert George Bennett | For service to the sawmilling industry | |
| Chief Superintendent Colin Benson | For service to the SA Police Force | |
| Tessa Daphne Birnie | For service to music | |
| Jack Bisas | For service to the Greek community | |
| The Reverend Father James Daniel Boberg | For service to the community | |
| Elizabeth Jane Boland | For service to the community | |
| Mary Grace Cummings Bouquet | For service to education administration | |
| James Henry Brooks MBE | For service to the welfare of ex-service personnel | |
| Philip George Brown | For service to sport and conservation | |
| Helen Margaret Brownlee | For service to the sport of canoeing | |
| Helena Martha Brunner | For service to the sport of swimming | |
| Dr Cuong Trong Bui | For service to the Vietnamese community in Australia. | |
| Wahin Bynie | For service to the Cocos (Keeling) Islands community of Australia | |
| Eva Grace Byrne | For service to the community, particularly in the field of ethnic affairs | |
| Margaret Francis Carnegie | For service to art, literature and to local history | |
| Sister Mary Milfred Casey | For service to religion | |
| Bernard Keith Chapman | For service to the Public Service | |
| Dr Maurice Patrick Cleary | For service to medicine | |
| Emanuel John Comino | For service to the Greek community | |
| Sister Mary Joachim Cook | For service to children's welfare | |
| Donald Walter Cooley | For service to the trade-union movement | |
| Mervyn Lawrence Cooper | For service to the welfare of ex-service personnel | |
| Molly Courts | For service to the community. | |
| Robert Cecil Cugley | For service to the arts through printing | |
| Mavis Pearl Daniels | For service to the sport of lawn bowls | |
| Arnold Fred Delbridge | For service to the welfare of the ageing | |
| John William Dickinson | For service to the Public Service | |
| Gordon Robert Dowling | For service to the community | |
| Father Gerard Patrick Dowling | For service to the community, particularly in the field of family welfare | |
| Minnie Catherine Drayton | For service to the community, particularly to those with disabilities | |
| Ethel Marshall Dunphy | For service to the community, particularly to those with impaired vision | |
| Peter Kevin Edmunds | For service to local government | |
| Stefan Einhorn | For service to the community | |
| Sergeant 2nd Class William Charles Fahey QPM | For service to the NSW police force | |
| Dr Jeffrey Rowe Faulkner | For service to the community, particularly in the field of welfare | |
| DrThomas Joseph Fennell | For service to the community | |
| Nancy Isobel Fischer | For service to the community | |
| Roger Anthony Fordham | For service to the Indo Chinese community | |
| Dorothy Eleanor Fullarton | For service to the community and to local government | |
| Basil Tsicos Galettis | For service to the Greek community | |
| George Samuel Gardner | For service to the community and to conservation | |
| Lindsay John Casson Gaze | For service to the sport of basketball | |
| Antonio Giancaspro | For service to the community | |
| Bernard James Giles | For service to the sport, particularly athletics and football | |
| Ronald Moreton Grant | For service to the sport of long distance running | |
| Phillip McGill Greene | For service to the community | |
| Michael Ronald Grenda | For service to the sport of cycling | |
| Garry Stewart Gudgeon | For service to the sport of swimming | |
| Rose Guruplatham | For service to the community | |
| Cree Haig | For service to the Cocos (Keeling) Islands community of Australia | |
| Jean Anne Halcrow | For service in the field of occupational therapy | |
| Stanley Frederick Hardy | For service to the community | |
| Willis Harper | For service to the community | |
| Mona Georgina Harris | For service to youth welfare | |
| William Frederick Harry | For service to the automotive industry in Western Australia | |
| Barbara Jean Hawkins | For service to nursing | |
| Kenneth Victor Hile | For service to the community particularly with the Salvation Army. | |
| Valerie Emily Hiscox | For service to the welfare of children with disabilities. | |
| Gordon Frederick Hitchick | For service to primary industry. | |
| Francis Richard Graham Hodgetts | For service to the rehabilitation of those with disabilities. | |
| Eleanor Joan Hogben | For service to the welfare of ex-service personnel. | |
| Reo Wallace Humphrys | For service to the community. | |
| Clarence Frederick Ireland | For service to the welfare of ex-service personnel. | |
| Kevin George Jacobsen | For service to the performing arts. | |
| Kenneth Ralph James | For service to primary industry and to local government. | |
| Dr Vernon Allen James | For service to medicine, particularly in the field of vascular surgery. | |
| Dorothy Louisa Johnstone | For service to the sport of croquet. | |
| Maurice Roy Jones | For service to the community. | |
| Geraldine Whittle Kaminski | For service to science, particularly in the field of mycology. | |
| Belford Alan Keir | For public service. | |
| William Kennedy | For service to the sport of golf. | |
| Edwina Jane Kennedy | For service to the sport of golf. | |
| Colin Kerby | For service to the community. | |
| Sarah Murdoch King | For service to the trade union movement and to the community. | |
| Aubrey McDiarmid Knowles | For service to the banking industry | |
| Curnow Andrew Knuckey | For service in the field of hospital administration. | |
| Elizabeth Dudley Kosmala | For service to the sport of air rifle shooting | |
| Henry Jan Krzymuski | For service to the Polish community in Australia. | |
| Raymond William Harrold Kutcher | For service to the sport of Australian football | |
| John William Leight | For service to the community | |
| Nadia Lozzi-Cuthbertson | For service to the community, particularly in the field of ethnic affairs | |
| Thomas Murray Ludlow | For service to the sport of fishing | |
| Dinko (Dean) Lukin | For service to the sport of weightlifting | |
| Estelle Bridson Lyons | For service to the community particularly in the field of librarianship | |
| Stanley John MacKay | For service to the development of the banana industry in Northern Queensland | |
| Roy Bede Mahony | For service to the hotel industry and to the sport of horse racing. | |
| Malcolm George Maitland MBE | For service to scouting | |
| Thomas Charles Marshall | For public service and for service to the community | |
| Arnold Hatherleigh Matters | For service to music, particularly as an opera singer and teacher. | |
| Hugh McCarthy | For service to the trade union movement. | |
| Douglas Lyall McColl | For service to the community | |
| Russell Keith McDonald | For service to local government and to the community | |
| The Reverend Douglas Gordon McKenzie | For service to religion | |
| John Harold Medway | For service to the Australian meat industry and to the trade union movement | |
| Joseph John Menegola | For service for sport | |
| Peter Mihailovich | For service to the community, particularly as a court interpreter | |
| Leopoldine Mimovich | For service to sculpture | |
| John Wood Mitchell | For service to the community | |
| Dorothy Leoni Moore | For service to music | |
| John Irvine Moorhead | For service to the community and to local government. | |
| Jill Mortimer | For public service | |
| Ikram Husain Naqvi | For service to the community | |
| Kevin John Nichols | For service to the sport of cycling | |
| Dr Dorothy Celia Nolan | For service to medicine and to the community | |
| William James Child North | For service to secondary industry and to the community | |
| Glynis Leanne Nunn | For service to athletics | |
| William James O'Reilly | For service to the community in the field of single parent welfare. | |
| Mary Madeleine Ormsby | For service to the sport of lawn bowls | |
| Herbert Parker | For service to the Aboriginal community | |
| Stanley Walter Parks | For service to local government | |
| Dorothy Jean Pash | For service to the community, particularly to the welfare of the ageing | |
| Dr Anthony Constantine Michael Paul | For service to medicine, particularly through the Flying Surgeon Service and investment development in Queensland | |
| Herbert Harry Pearson | For service to the community in the field of social welfare | |
| Elinor Jean Penney | For service to the community, particularly to those with impaired vision | |
| Jack Ambrose Perini | For service to the community through financial support to health and welfare organisations | |
| John Graham Porter | For service to the trade union movement | |
| Raymond Alan Price | For service to the sport of Rugby League football | |
| Robert Keith Purdam | For public service, particularly with the Department of Aviation | |
| William Joseph Purtell | For service to the community in the field of social welfare | |
| Dr Marta Judith Rado | For service to linguistics and to multicultural education | |
| Dr John Allan Raschke | For service to the sport of basketball | |
| William Henry Ratcliffe | For service to local government | |
| Elsie Elizabeth Read | For service to the community | |
| Anne Elizabeth Gundry Reeves | For service to local government, to conservation and to women's affairs | |
| Ann Houghton Roberts | For service to ballet, particularly as a dancer and teacher | |
| Lindsay Buckley Robertson | For service to the community | |
| Lee Robinson | For service to the Australian film and television industry | |
| Norman Russell | For service to the community and to sport | |
| Leo William Ryan | For public service, particularly with the Department of Territories and Local Government | |
| Douglas Eduard Schahinger | For service to the rehabilitation of those with disabilities | |
| Gisella Scheinberg | For service to the arts | |
| Oscar Schurmann | For service to the community | |
| Thomas George Secker | For service to local government and to the community | |
| Lindsay Delma Sevenoaks | For service to nursing and to the NSW Civil Defence and State Emergency Service | |
| Austin William Shiner | For service to the sport of Rugby League football | |
| Jonathon Scott Sieben | For service to the sport of swimming | |
| Isabelle Simpson | For public service and for service to the community | |
| Nessie Mary Skuta | For service to the Aboriginal community | |
| Paul William Smith | For service to the sport of surf lifesaving | |
| Maxine Grace Smith | For service to the community | |
| Melinda Jane Smith | For service to the community, particularly to those with disabilities | |
| Noel Richard Spurr | For service to the community, particularly to those with disabilities | |
| Dr Peter John Terence Cathcart Stanbury | For service to science and to the community | |
| Anne-Marie Maude Stuart | For service to the welfare of the ageing | |
| John Digby Sutter | For service to the sport of Australian football | |
| Maria Szajewski | For service to the welfare of ethnic communities | |
| Ronald Condon Tallon | For service to the sport of surf lifesaving | |
| Howard Raymond Clifton Taylor | For service to the community | |
| Phillip Cecil Thompson | For service to the welfare of ex-service personnel | |
| Georgina Margaret Thompson | For service to the Aboriginal community | |
| Samuel Warren Thorning | For service to the community | |
| Donald Noel Thurlow | For public service and for service to the community. | |
| Dudley Charles Tuckey | For service to local government and to the community | |
| Lorraine Tuckwell | For service to the community | |
| Michael Colin Turtur | For service to the sport of cycling | |
| Agnes May Tweedie | For service to the community particularly to those with impaired vision | |
| Norman Guy Von Nida | For service to the sport of golf | |
| John Michael Waldron | For public service particularly in the field of military engineering | |
| James George Waldron | For service to the community, particularly to those with disabilities | |
| Winsome Shirley Ward | For public service, particularly with the Department of Veterans Affairs and for service to the community | |
| Senior Sergeant Francis Warner | For public service with the South Australian Police Force and to the Aboriginal community | |
| John Sydney Warrington | For service to scouting | |
| Mary Wilson | For service to the sport of hockey | |
| Dean Anthony Woods | For service to the sport of cycling | |
| Lial James Woods | For service to the community and to the newspaper industry | |
| Frederick William Wright | For service to conservation and to the preservation of Aboriginal sites | |
| Parson Yapat | For service to the Cocos (Keeling) Islands community of Australia | |

==== Military Division ====
| Branch | Recipient | Citation | Notes |
|---|---|---|---|
| Navy | Chief Petty Officer Arthur Gordon Brimelow | For service as the Petty Officer Cook, HMAS Moreton. | |
| Navy | Chief Petty Officer William John Callingham | For service to the Fleet Air Arm. | |
| Navy | Warrant Officer Bruce Malcolm Campbell | For service to Naval Support Command. | |
| Navy | Leading Seaman Brendan Michael Keane | For service to the Mine Countermeasures Squadron. | |
| Navy | Chief Petty Officer Leslie John Kinnest | For service to the Royal Australian Naval College. | |
| Navy | Chief Petty Officer Graham Godfrey Stuart Thurstans | For service as Assistant Marine Engineer Officer, HMAS Hobart. | |
| Army | Warrant Officer Class II Gregory John Bacon | For service in the office of the Garrison Engineer for the NSW region. | |
| Army | Warrant Officer Class II Jillian Margaret Canton | For service in the office of the Military Secretary. | |
| Army | Warrant Officer Class II Peter Charles Diamond | For service as the Quartermaster-Sergeant of the 6th Training Group. | |
| Army | Warrant Officer Class I John Wesley Dowse | For service in the trade training of apprentices. | |
| Army | Warrant Officer Class II Garrick Thomas Evans | For service with the 21st Supply Battalion. | |
| Army | Warrant Officer Class II Joseph Stuart Fawcett | For service as bandmaster of the Queensland University Regiment Band. | |
| Army | Warrant Officer Class II Norman John Hanney | For service as the chief clerk of the Directorate of Army Health. | |
| Army | Warrant Officer Class II Charles Alick Marsland | For service with 1st Commando Regiment. | |
| Army | Warrant Officer Class II Ki Franz Schoene | For service with the 4th Field Regiment, Royal Australian Artillery. | |
| Army | Warrant Officer Class I Graham John Sheehan | For service to the 1st Ordinance Services Unit. | |
| Army | Warrant Officer Class I Bryan Allen Smith | For service as Regimental Sergeant Major of the 1st Battalion, Royal Australian Regiment. | |
| Army | Warrant Officer Class II Graham George Spring | For service with 91st Forestry Squadron, Royal Australian Engineers. | |
| Army | Warrant Officer Class II Michael Waldron | For service as Regimental Quartermaster Sergeant of Headquarters, 8th Brigade. | |
| Army | Lance-Corporal Catherine Monica Witney | For service to the Joint Services Staff College. | |
| Air Force | Warrant Officer Maurice Kelly Bohan | For service to the Royal Australian Air Force in the field of motor transport support. | |
| Air Force | Warrant Officer Robert Doyle | For service as a clerk, equipment accounts, at RAAF Base Richmond. | |
| Air Force | Sergeant Alan Michael Jeffery | For service as an electrical fitter. | |
| Air Force | Sergeant Keith William Raison | For service as a supply supervisor with No 6 Squadron. | |
| Air Force | Warrant Officer Warren John Russell | For service in the field of aircraft maintenance. | |
| Air Force | Warrant Officer Rodney Kenneth Walter Shepherd | For service to the RAAF School of Technical Training. | |
| Air Force | Sergeant Robert Malcolm Umstad | For service as an airframe fitter with No 77 Squadron. | |
