= Monique Brynnel =

Swedish-Australian operatic soprano

Monica Margareta Weaving, stage name Monique Brynnel, is a Swedish-Australian operatic soprano and teacher of singing. She was married to the Australian baritone/tenor Jon Weaving.

Brynnel first came to public notice in Australia in 1971, when she and the Melbourne-born Weaving were engaged with Sadlers Wells opera and appeared on ABC-TV in the documentary film Monique and Jon. In 1979 Weaving returned with Brynnel to the city of his birth and appeared together in a number of concerts, including a "Concert for the People" at the Sidney Myer Music Bowl and later with the Melbourne Symphony Orchestra under conductor John Hopkins, and made an LP record World of Operetta.

She made her debut with Australian Opera (now Opera Australia) in 1981, when she played Adele to Joan Sutherland's Rosalinde in Die Fledermaus. This production on 10 July 1982 was Australia's first simulcast, relayed throughout the country on ABC-FM radio and ABC TV live from the Sydney Opera House. It was also released by Decca Records as a two-LP set "Strauss: Die Fledermaus Live from the Sydney Opera House".

Weaving and Brynnel founded a business in Fyshwick, ACT, preserving trees, a process that takes several years to complete and with no guarantee of a sale, meanwhile continuing to perform. She played a "harsh voiced" Despina in Così fan tutte, and starred in a Vienna-styled New Year's Eve concert.

In 1992 they founded the Academy of Singing in Melbourne.

In 1994 they were living at Mount Martha, Victoria, when they separately declared themselves bankrupt.

In 2011 they left Australia for Sweden, where Weaving died.

== Publications ==
- Monique Brynnel and Jon Weaving, with Gillian Nikakis (2010), Music and Love, ISBN 9780646950273
