= Myer Fredman =

British-Australian conductor (1932–2014)

Myer Fredman (29 January 1932 – 4 July 2014) was a British-Australian conductor.

He studied at Dartington Hall and in London with Peter Gellhorn, Vilém Tauský, Sir Adrian Boult, and was assistant conductor to Otto Klemperer, Vittorio Gui, Sir John Pritchard and Sir Charles Mackerras.

Fredman was conductor at the Glyndebourne Festival from 1963 to 1974. He was involved in the creation of Glyndebourne Touring Opera, where he was musical director for seven years, 1968–74. After moving to Australia, Fredman became musical director of the State Opera of South Australia 1974–80, and conductor and artistic associate with Opera Australia 1983–98. In 1988, he directed the International Summer Vocal School in Salt Lake City.

Myer Fredman conducted the Australian premieres of Sir Michael Tippett's opera The Midsummer Marriage (in the presence of the composer), and Benjamin Britten's opera Death in Venice, at consecutive Adelaide Festivals. His world-premiere recordings include Arnold Bax's 1st and 2nd symphonies and Havergal Brian's 6th symphony, all with the London Philharmonic Orchestra, and Brian's 16th symphony with the Royal Philharmonic Orchestra; and Peter Sculthorpe's piano concerto and a television opera, Quiros. His other recordings included the music of Britten, Delius, Vaughan Williams, Respighi, Rubbra, Sir Eugene Goossens, Arthur Benjamin, Richard Meale, Robert Still, and Ross Edwards.

Fredman also conducted the premieres of other Havergal Brian symphonies, and he was a vice-president of the Havergal Brian Society.

Myer Fredman orchestrated and arranged instrumental and operatic music by J. S. Bach, John Dowland, Mozart, Donizetti, Tchaikovsky, Puccini and Elgar, and he was the first person to write extensively of the role of the conductor in the operas of Mozart, in From Idomeneo to Die Zauberflote; A conductor's commentary.

The Italian Government awarded Myer Fredman the medal Per Servizio della Musica e Cultura Italiana.

Fredman was a teacher to many musicians, including Kim Sutherland and Derek Williams. He moved to Hobart, Tasmania, where he conducted and taught as adjunct professor at the University of Tasmania's Conservatorium of Music. He was also involved in creating The Tasmanian Discovery Orchestra. He died in Hobart on 4 July 2014, aged 82.
