= Marianne Mathy =

German-born singer

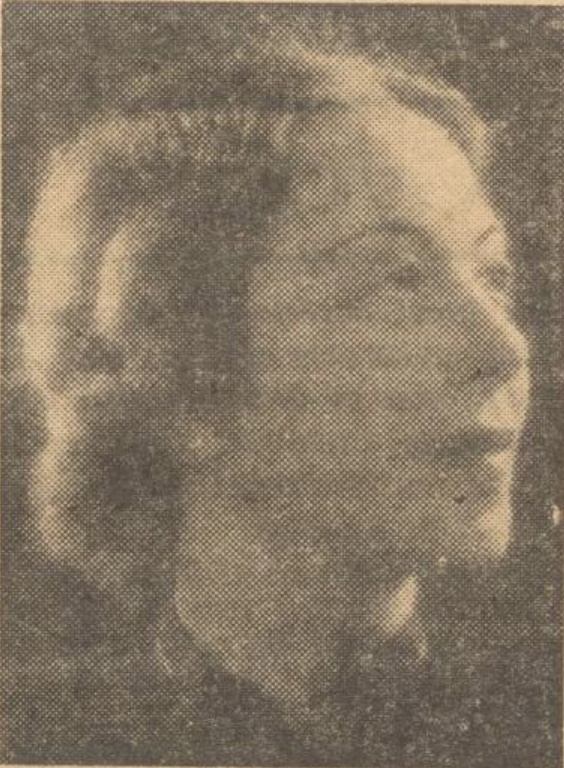
- Marianne Mathy in 1939
- Born: Marianne Helene Sara Kahn; 23 June 1890; Mannheim, Germany
- Died: October 15, 1978 (aged 88); Double Bay, New South Wales, Australia

Marianne Mathy (pronounced [marɪanə matiː]; 23 June 1890 – 15 October 1978) was a German-born coloratura soprano opera singer and distinguished teacher of opera and classical singing.

== Germany ==
She was born Marianne Helene Sara Kahn in Mannheim, Germany on 23 June 1890. She was baptised as a Lutheran in 1896, though her father's family were Jewish. In 1913, Marianne married Colonel Erich Mathy, an officer of Kaiser Wilhelm II's Imperial German Army. Though they divorced the next year, with Eric killed in action shortly thereafter, Marianne retained Mathy's name for the remainder of her life. In 1921, she married Berlin architect, Franz (Francis) Martin Friendenstein. They later changed this name by deed poll in February 1945 from Friendenstein to Frisdane.

Her musical education included piano, theory, speech training, interpretation and voice production, with a special course for the treatment of damaged vocal cords. Though her initial formal training emphasised piano, Marianne showed early promise as an opera and classical singer. In 1918 Marianne was offered her first engagement singing at a provincial opera, as Gretel in Engelbert Humperdinck's Hansel and Gretel. She became well known as an interpreter of Lieder and of early music. She went on to perform in Germany during the 1920s and 1930s. In 1929, Mathy received the State Certificate, Berlin, with Honourable Mention in recognition of her public performances and as a teacher of singing.

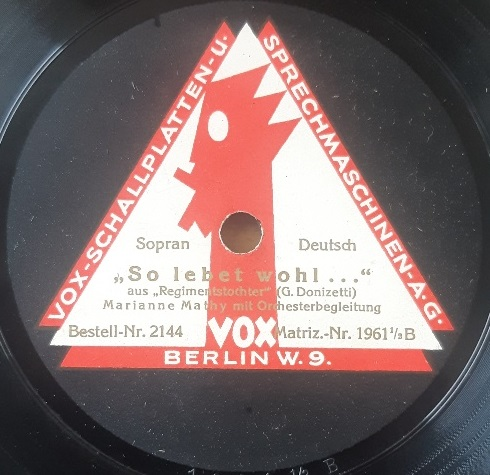
Record of Marianne Mathy (Berlin 1923)

== Australia ==
On Malcolm Sargent's advice, the couple emigrated in 1939 to Sydney, Australia. They were naturalized in 1944. From 1959, Mathy taught for three years at the National Institute of Dramatic Art (NIDA), and from 1954 until 1972 at the NSW State Conservatorium of Music (now Sydney Conservatorium of Music), and participated in the inaugural meeting for the short-lived New South Wales National Opera, the predecessor of the Australian Opera (now Opera Australia). In 1963, she was commissioned by the Australian Elizabethan Theatre Trust to make a new English translation of Charles Gounod's opera Faust.

A highly respected teacher of opera and classical singers, Mathy taught fifteen winners of the Melbourne Sun Aria. In 1965 she wrote The Singer's Companion. Many of her pupils became nationally and internationally renowned opera singers and include Althea Bridges, June Bronhill, Joan Sutherland, Peter Cousens and Lyndon Terracini.

== Legacy ==
Mathy left in her will a bequest from which the Marianne Mathy Scholarship for young opera and classical singers was established. First awarded in 1982 to New Zealand soprano Nicola Waite, the Scholarship, also known as The Mathy, is one of the longest-running, recognised and respected scholarships of its type in Australia and New Zealand. The Mathy is the major award in the Australian Singing Competition. These are both managed by Music & Opera Singers Trust (MOST).

The 1-hour documentary The Legacy of Madame Marianne Mathy was premiered in 2022 at the Jewish International Film Festival in Sydney.
