= Marie Watson-Blake =

Marie Watson-Blake (6 August 1927 - 21 April 1993) was a business leader in the tourism and travel industries in Queensland, Australia.

She founded Jetset Travel and ran its Queensland operation. She also had an interest in philanthropy and the arts.

At the time of her death, she was the deputy chairman of the Queensland Tourist and Travel Corporation.

Watson-Blake was made an Officer of the Order of the British Empire by Queen Elizabeth II and the Labor government of Australia.
