= Hanno Blaschke =

German baritone

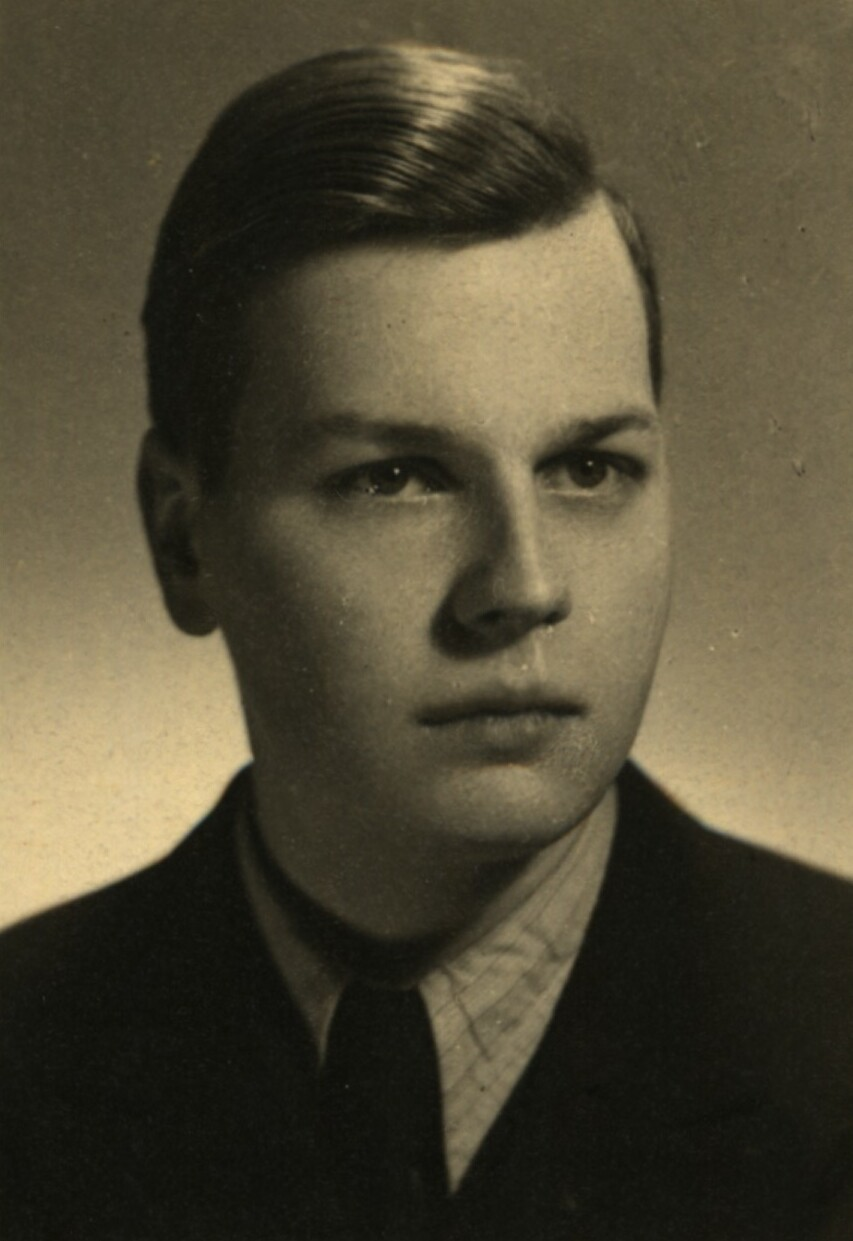
Hanno Blaschke

Hanno Blaschke (22 April 1927 – 18 November 2017) was a German baritone and professor of singing. Blaschke most recently held a professorship for singing at the University of Music and Performing Arts Munich.

== Life ==
Born in Danzig, Blaschke took private singing lessons with the Kammersänger Robert Büssel in Dresden. There, he experienced the Bombing of Dresden. He studied at the University of Breslau, the University of Warsaw and the Stanisław Moniuszko Academy of Music in Gdańsk (at that time still in Sopot). He subsequently worked as a concert singer and singing teacher and gained international renown. His special inclination to promote young talent led him first to Warsaw (assistant to Ada Sari). In 1961, he began teaching at the University of Music and Performing Arts Munich, which appointed him full professor in 1975. Until his retirement in 1992, he trained numerous singers who went on to international careers. He was in demand as a leader of master classes and as a juror worldwide until his death.

== Honours ==
- Cross of the Order of Merit of the Federal Republic of Germany, "as one of the essential music educators in the German-speaking world" (15 October 1981)
- Officer's Cross of the Order of Merit of the Federal Republic of Germany (27 August 1998)
- Medal of Honour of the University of Music and Theatre Munich (2006)
