= Queensland Youth Choir =

- Origin: Brisbane, Qld, Australia
- Genres: Contemporary; Classical; Popular; Folk; Rock; Gospel; Jazz; Art music Musical theatre Australiana
- Years active: 1984–present
- Labels: Independent label
- Past members: Jason Barry-Smith; Leisa Barry-Smith; Tarita Botsman; Michael Falzon; Ian Stenlake; Karen Williams; Craig Allister Young; David Kidd
- Website: Official site

The Queensland Show Choir was founded by Robert Clark in 1984, originally as a training program for young singers. It was then called the Queensland Youth Choir. The choir has since evolved into three performance choirs: Poco Voci, Stella Voce, and Vivace . The Queensland Show Choir also run a community choir Vox Populus, and an early childhood music program Bambino Music. The choir's home is the Old Museum Building, and over the years, the choir has produced many well-known music professionals such as Jason Barry-Smith and Tarita Botsman.

== Name Change ==
Official Queensland Youth Choir logo

In 2012, the choir officially changed its name to the Queensland Show Choir. Since the introduction of Vox Populus and More Than Words it was thought that the name no longer suited the organisation, which now catered for all ages. The name change also helped reaffirm the artistic style Robert Clark founded QYC on in 1984. The organisation was inspired by the Show Choir movement in the United States and in particular, a group called the Singing Hoosiers

== Ensembles ==
There are several vocal ensembles which are part of the umbrella group of the Queensland Show Choir.

=== VoiceWorks ===
VoiceWorks was the Queensland Youth Choir's flagship ensemble, with members from 17 to 25 years of age. This ensemble performs all year round, and has had the experience of performing with many famous people, including Michael Crawford, Tina Arena, and Frank Sinatra. In 2008 VoiceWorks competed in Channel 7's Battle of the Choirs where they advanced to the semi-finals and finished in the top four behind University of Newcastle, Vox Synergy and Harambee. After being inactive for a number of years, VoiceWorks recommended in 2018 as an ensemble for young adults. This group of school leavers and university students come together during term time to make music together. They perform year round, at community and private events, Christmas Caroles, in QSC's annual concert series and at the annual Brisbane Sings. No audition is required for entry into the VoiceWorks choir.

=== Queensland Young Voices ===
Created in 2019, this ensemble is the combined product of Stella Voce and Vivace. The choir is for children in Year 5 to Year 12, and is non-auditioned.

=== Vivace ===
Students from Year 8 to Year 12 perform in Vivace. This ensemble also performs all year round at community and private events, Christmas Carol concerts, and in QSC's annual concert series. An audition is required for entry into the Vivace Choir. This ensemble was discontinued at the end of 2018.

=== Stella Voce ===
Formerly known as The Queensland Children's Choir, the group was renamed to StellaVoce in 2005, and remains under that name today. This choir is for children in Year 4 through to Year 9, and performs in both public and private concerts. The group was founded by Rhonda Coady, and choristers in this group are auditioned.

This ensemble was discontinued at the end of 2018.

=== Poco Voci ===
Poco Voci is a non-auditioned group for students from pre-school through to Year 4. The main aim of this group is to develop music skills in young children, and as such, this choir performs less frequently.

=== Vox Populus ===
Vox Populus is a non-auditioned, SATB, community choir for anyone over the age of 18. The aim of the group is to encourage community singing in a fun environment.

=== More Than Words ===
More Than Words is a corporate vocal group, started for the express purpose of catering to functions which require a smaller ensemble. Membership does not usually exceed 12 members. More Than Words perform at many events around Brisbane, such as the Best of the Pops concert at QPAC in 2016 with the Queensland Pops Orchestra.

== Brisbane Sings ==
Brisbane Sings has been held since 2012. The Queensland Show Choir produces this annual massed choir event, held in the Queensland Performing Arts Centre (QPAC).

== President's Trophy Night ==
President's Trophy Night is a special annual event designed to showcase individual performers within QSC. Entrance into the finals of this event is possible after performers complete a heat in either solo, duet, or small ensemble format.

Prizes are also given to those who place 1st, 2nd and 3rd in their respective age group. In addition to this, encouragement awards are also presented to performers in the junior and senior categories.
