= Stefan Haag =

Australian theatre director and singer

Stefan Haag CH CBE
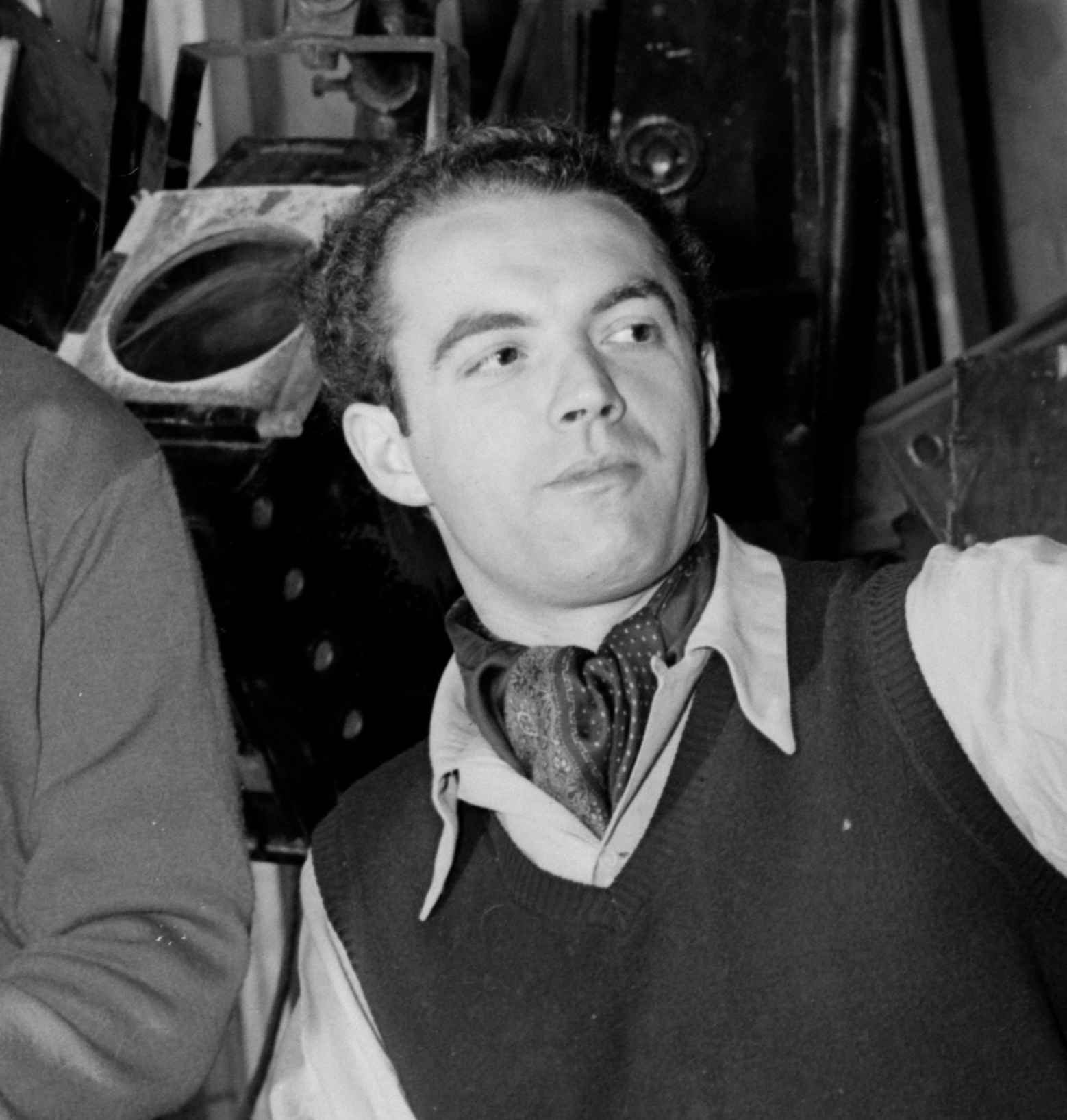
- Portrait of Stefan Haag, Australia, 1952
- Born: Stefan Hermann Haag; 26 March 1925; Vienna, Austria
- Died: 25 December 1986 (aged 61); Sydney, New South Wales
- Occupations: Theatre director and singer
- Spouse: Helen Mitchell McAra

Stefan Hermann Haag OBE (26 March 1925 – 25 December 1986) was an Austrian-born Australian singer; opera, theatre, and television director and producer; lighting and set designer; and arts administrator.

== Biography ==
Stefan Hermann Haag was born on 26 March 1925 in Vienna, Austria.

As a child he sang with the Vienna Boys Choir and Vienna Mozart Boys Choir. The choir found itself stranded in Australia at the outbreak of World War II in 1939, and Haag, then aged around 14, decided to stay.

== Career ==
Haag sang baritone roles with the National Opera Theatre (possibly under the name Louis Waters) and later became a producer for the National Theatre Movement (1948–50). In 1950 he returned to Europe on a Victorian Government scholarship to study arts production.

In 1956 Stefan Haag became production director of the newly formed Elizabethan Theatre Trust Opera Company, the forerunner of Opera Australia. In 1957 he directed its production of Offenbach’s The Tales of Hoffmann. From 1960 to 1962 he was opera company's artistic director. From 1963 to 1969 he was executive director of the Elizabethan Theatre Trust.

He later worked as a television and theatre producer and was artistic director of several arts festivals. He promoted successful productions such as Hair and Jesus Christ Superstar and promoted Aboriginal theatre. He was also a director of the New Zealand Drama Council summer school.

== Honours ==
In the 1968 Queen's Birthday Honours, Haag was appointed an Officer of the Order of the British Empire for his development of the performing arts.
