= Moffatt Oxenbould =

Australian opera director (born 1943)

Moffatt Benjamin Oxenbould AM (born 18 November 1943) is a retired Australian opera director.

The Sydney-born Oxenbould was artistic director of Opera Australia from 1984 until his retirement in 1999. In 1962 he joined the company – known as Elizabethan Theatre Trust Opera Company – after graduating from the National Institute of Dramatic Art in theatre production. After his retirement he directed with Opera Australia and Houston Grand Opera and was a presenter with the classical music radio station ABC Classic FM.

Oxenbould was made a Member of the Order of Australia in January 1985 for his services to opera. In 2005 he released his memoirs Timing is Everything, describing his 37 years in opera in Australia. The Sydney Morning Herald's reviewer Andrew Riemer found it "a well-written, comprehensive and absorbing account". His long-term domestic partner is operatic tenor Graeme Ewer.

== Bibliography ==
- Oxenbould, Moffatt (2005), Timing Is Everything: a Life Backstage at the Opera, City of Sydney Archives, ISBN 0733317138
