= Sydney Eisteddfod =

Australian not-for-profit organisation

Sydney Eisteddfod is an independent, community-based, not-for-profit organisation in Sydney, Australia. It aims to promote the performing arts through competitions and public performances.

== About ==
The Sydney Eisteddfod is an annual musical competition, supported by professionals in arts and education. The event features categories for singers, dancers, actors, musicians, choirs, bands and orchestras, along with creative categories for composers, writers and poets.

Established in 1933 as the City of Sydney Eisteddfod, the inaugural competition took place from 9 to 26 August in the Sydney Town Hall and Paling's Concert Hall. The event attracted significant public interest, with an illustrated souvenir programme sold for one shilling.

In addition to competitions, the Sydney Eisteddfod collaborates with arts organizations to provide opportunities for emerging artists. It hosts recital, concerts, and fosters interest in the performing and creative arts to engage future audiences.

In 2011, the Sydney Eisteddfod won the City of Sydney Business Award in the Cultural and Creative Services category.

== History ==
The Sydney Eisteddfod originated from the Music Week Festival, first held in 1930. By 1932, representatives from the Music Week Festival and the Citizens of Sydney Organising Committee announced plans for a larger-scale eisteddfod, which officially launched in August 1933. This event sought to bring together talent from across Australia, supported by the New South Wales State Conservatorium (now the Sydney Conservatorium of Music).

The first executive meeting of the Eisteddfod was held on 20 February 1933, and the first official program included 84 vocal, choral, speech, and musical events, drawing 5,410 entries. The opening ceremony on 19 August 1933 featured performances by notable artists such as Joan Hammond, Ernest Llewellyn, and Joy Nichols.

The Eisteddfod was suspended for four years during the Pacific War but resumed again afterwards. In 1949, the Sun News-Pictorial began sponsoring the aria, coinciding with the Melbourne Sun Aria contests. Renowned performers such as Joan Sutherland (1949) and June Bronhill (1950) were among the winners of this competition.

In 1988, McDonald's Australia became a naming rights sponsor, marking a long-term partnership. The 2020 competition was cancelled due to the COVID-19 pandemic in Australia, but resumed in subsequent years.
