= Opera Australia =

Principal opera company in Australia

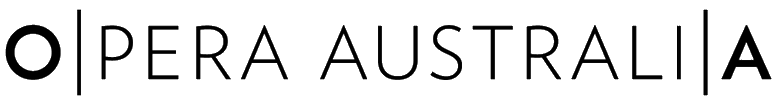
Logo of the company

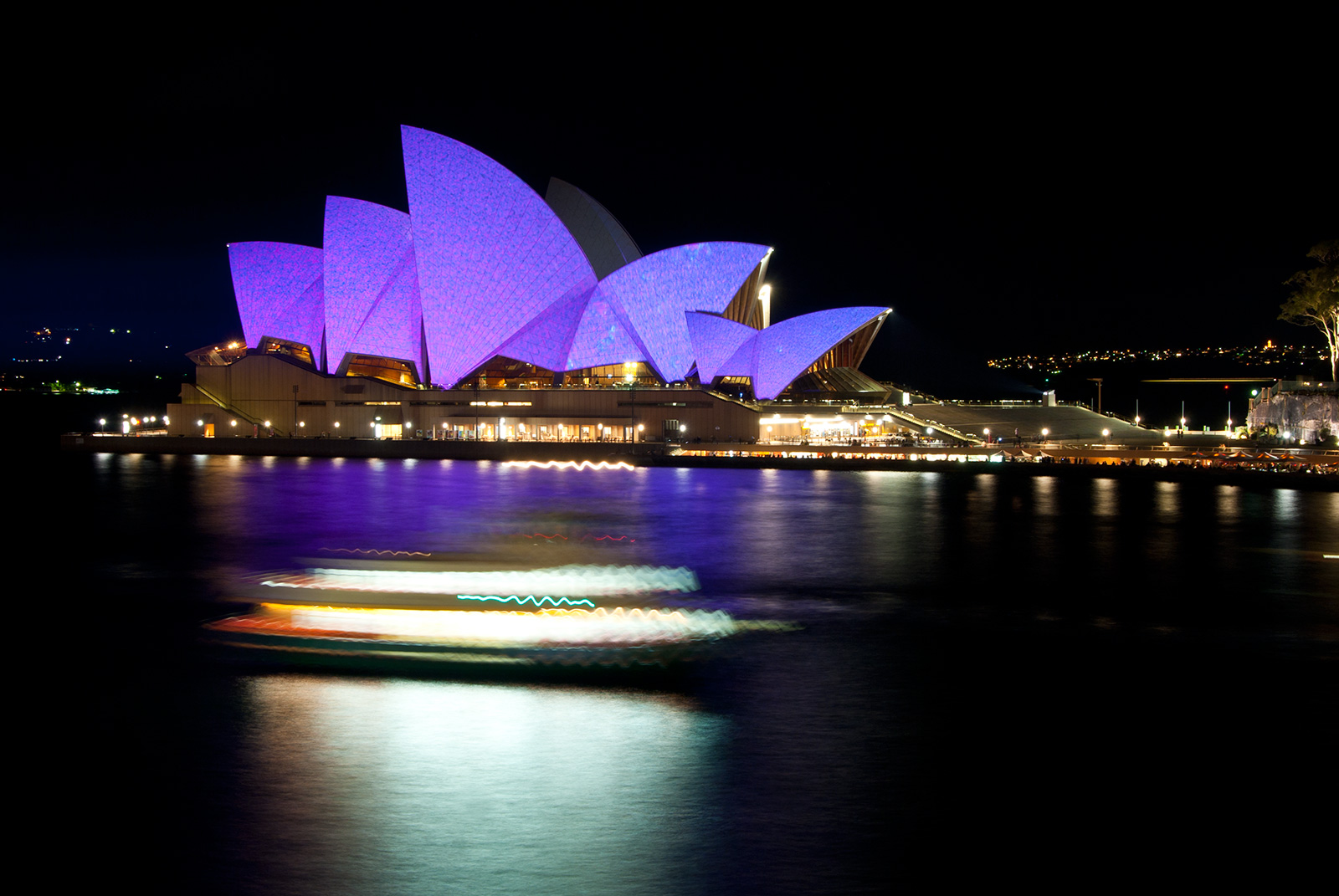
Sydney Opera House, home of Opera Australia, illuminated at night

Opera Australia is the principal opera company in Australia. Based in Sydney, New South Wales, its performance season at the Sydney Opera House accompanied by the Opera Australia Orchestra runs for approximately eight months of the year, with the remainder of its time spent at the Arts Centre Melbourne, where it is accompanied by Orchestra Victoria. In 2004, the company gave 226 performances in its subscription seasons in Sydney and Melbourne, Victoria, attended by more than 294,000 people.

It is funded by government grants, corporate sponsorship, private philanthropy, and ticket sales. The proportion of its revenue from ticket sales is considerably higher than that of most companies, approximately 75 per cent. The company is perhaps best known internationally for its association with Dame Joan Sutherland, for Baz Luhrmann's production of Puccini's La bohème in the early 1990s and more recently, for, apart from performances inside the opera house, large scale outdoor performances on Sydney Harbour.

Many thousands of Australians also experience the company's work through television, radio, video, compact disc, DVD, and the annual free performance of opera in the Domain in Sydney. The company also performs in an annual outdoor event at Mrs Macquarie's Chair, Handa Opera on Sydney Harbour, where since 2012 operas such as La traviata, Madama Butterfly, Turandot, Aida and Carmen have played.

== History ==
=== Australian Opera Company, 1956–57 ===
In 1956, the Australian Opera Company was formed in Sydney under the auspices of the Australian Elizabethan Theatre Trust. It commemorated the Mozart bicentenary by presenting four Mozart operas in all capital cities, travelling more than 10,000 kilometres, and giving 169 performances.

=== Elizabethan Theatre Trust Opera Company, 1957–70 ===
By 1957, it changed its name to the Elizabethan Theatre Trust Opera Company.

In 1959 the company's laid-off singers gave the first of many regional tours (presented by state Arts Councils) with Rossini's The Barber of Seville using reduced scenery and conducted from the piano by Georg Tintner (Victoria, New South Wales, Queensland). Subsequent Arts Council tours included Rigoletto (1960; Victoria, Queensland, New South Wales), Così fan tutte (1961; New South Wales, Queensland) and La traviata (1962; New South Wales, Queensland), all conducted by Tintner. However, by 1963 a permanent nucleus of singers and staff was retained throughout the year and the company had made appearances at regional festivals, including the Adelaide Festival. It was also able to establish the first Elizabethan Trust Orchestra for the company by 1967 with additional government aid. During this time, Stefan Haag played an important role in the development of the company.

A major milestone for the company was a television recording of Puccini's Tosca filmed in 1968 at the Adelaide Festival. This starred Tito Gobbi as Scarpia alongside two Australian singers, soprano Marie Collier in the title role, and tenor Donald Smith as Cavaradossi, with the Argentinian born, Italian conductor Carlo Felice Cillario conducting. This was the commencement of a long and fruitful association between the Australian Opera and Cillario until his retirement in 2003. Some of his first rehearsals in the country involved conducting the Elizabethan Sydney Orchestra and the Australian Opera Chorus, both newly formed and on permanent contracts.

While not yet appearing with this company, Joan Sutherland, then an internationally known Australian soprano, and her husband, the conductor Richard Bonynge, helped the cause of opera in general in Australia during the 1960s. Sutherland's name was also linked to the progress of the Sydney Opera House, begun in 1957 and still undergoing a lengthy and controversial construction. By the time "La Stupenda" appeared there in 1974, one year after the opening of the theatre, the company was a leading repertory company with a large chorus and a roster of experienced Australian principals supplemented by guest singers and conductors.

=== The Australian Opera, 1970–96 ===
In 1970, the company became known as The Australian Opera. The 1970s saw considerable changes both in administration and location. In 1972, Edward Downes, formerly associated with London's Royal Opera House, became musical director, and his first new production was the Australian premiere of Richard Strauss's Der Rosenkavalier at the Princess Theatre, Melbourne, followed closely by Prokofiev's War and Peace as the opening night performance of the Sydney Opera House, a short time before the building's official opening.

The Sydney Opera House, as well as quickly becoming a distinctive cultural landmark in that city, gave the company a permanent performance home and thus helped to expand its repertoire and develop local audiences. Audiences were boosted by Joan Sutherland's performances with The Australian Opera in Offenbach's The Tales of Hoffmann. In the 1974 season, three Australian works were performed: The Affair by Felix Werder, Lenz by Larry Sitsky, and Rites of Passage by Peter Sculthorpe. (Rites of Passage was to have been the inaugural opera presentation at the Sydney Opera House, but was not ready in time.)

By 1976, Richard Bonynge had become musical director and he led the company on its first overseas tour to New Zealand with Verdi's Rigoletto and Janáček's Jenůfa, the latter conducted by Georg Tintner. This was followed in 1978 by the first Australian Opera country tour with orchestra to north-eastern New South Wales (Don Pasquale with the Queensland Theatre Orchestra, conducted by Tintner). The principal tenor for this tour was Robin Donald. From 1977 to 1990, the resident director was Elke Neidhardt.

In 1977, the New South Wales Friends of the Australian Opera and the Australian Elizabethan Theatre Trust established the Armstrong-Martin Scholarship to further the musical education of professional opera singers.

During the 1980s, after many years of recording performances by the Australian Opera for television, the Australian Broadcasting Corporation (ABC) and The Australian Opera presented their first live simulcast, Johann Strauss's Die Fledermaus, and it was seen by more than two million people. Over the following years a series of simulcasts reached millions of Australian homes.

Luciano Pavarotti and Joan Sutherland appeared at the Concert Hall of the Sydney Opera House in 1983, with the Elizabethan Sydney Orchestra conducted by Richard Bonynge (the sister orchestra in Melbourne was known as the Elizabethan Melbourne Orchestra. Now they are known respectively as the Australian Opera and Ballet Orchestra, Sydney and Orchestra Victoria, Melbourne). Another successful concert with Sutherland and Marilyn Horne was held in the Concert Hall.

Several innovative features characterised this period of the 1980s. The first, Esso Opera in the Park in the Sydney Domain, quickly became an annual event, and it is now called "Opera in the Domain". Typically, it attracts almost 100,000 people each year. A similar annual outdoor event, which attracts more than 25,000 people, is held in Melbourne. The second was the establishment of The Esso Young Artists' Development Program for the Australian Opera while the third was the Australian Compositions Program launched with a new production of Brian Howard's Metamorphosis.

Another innovative program, The National Opera Workshop, was established to enable selected Australian composers to present works in workshop form with artists from the Australian Opera. Lastly, OperaAction, the Youth Education Program, established a program of events, including three youth performances of Puccini's Madama Butterfly and, in 1986, Winds of the Solstice, an original youth opera created by 70 students working on libretto, music, choreography and orchestration and presented at the Sydney Opera House.

The company re-organised its administration gradually throughout the decade, appointing Moffatt Oxenbould as artistic director in 1984, and announcing that Bonynge would become Musical Director Emeritus and principal guest conductor from 1987, after his decade long contract as musical director expired.

In 1988, in association with the Australian Bicentennial Authority, the company toured Brisbane, Darwin, Hobart, Melbourne, Perth and the National Opera Workshop in Melbourne with The Ra Project, a music-theatre work composed with the direct participation from the earliest stages by the singers who performed it and marking director Baz Luhrmann's first association with the Australian Opera.

Sutherland gave her farewell performances for the Australian Opera in 1990 in a production of Meyerbeer's Les Huguenots. Two years later, the company named its major rehearsal studio after Dame Joan.

Also in 1990, Baz Luhrmann's La bohème premiered in Sydney, establishing Cheryl Barker and David Hobson as important principals in the company. Such was its impact that the production went on to play at the Broadway Theatre in New York in 2002 for 228 performances.

The early 1990s were to see two important changes in the way that the company worked: firstly, in 1991, with the formation of the Artistic Associates of The Australian Opera, a body of people was created which comprised some of the most important figures in the Australian musical and performing arts world. Secondly, the Australian Opera and Ballet Orchestra was integrated with the Australian Opera to produce a permanent opera and ballet orchestra for the company.

In its first performances outside Australasia in 1994, the company performed Britten's A Midsummer Night's Dream at the Edinburgh International Festival. In addition, the Baz Luhrmann production of La bohème was screened over more than 300 North American television stations, followed by worldwide video release and a later Broadway version.

== Opera Australia, since 1996 ==
Opera Australia (OA) was formed by the merger of the Australian Opera and the Victoria State Opera (VSO) companies in 1996, following the financial collapse of the Melbourne-based VSO. Adrian Collette was appointed general manager of the new company, and developed a three-year plan to restructure the company involving twice yearly seasons in both Sydney and Melbourne, integrating the OA and VSO staff and planning a viable financial structure so as to manage the inherited debt.

The first few years of the present century saw the retirement of Moffatt Oxenbould, Opera Australia's artistic director for 15 years, and the appointment of Simone Young as musical director. Immediately on taking up her position in 2001, Simone Young appointed the Australian director Stuart Maunder to the position of artistic director. Young proceeded to develop the company's core repertoire, including more German operas in the repertoire and diversifying the types of productions mounted and the standards of international and local artists employed. By late 2002 however, the OA board, faced with mounting deficits, announced that Young's future visions for the company were "unsustainable" and decided not to renew her contract after the end of 2003.

At the end of 2003, Richard Hickox was named music director-designate of Opera Australia, and took up the post full-time from January 2005. During his tenure, Hickox diversified the repertoire with the addition of more 20th-century works such as The Love for Three Oranges, Rusalka and Arabella, recording live performances of many of these works for Chandos Records. The company's 50th anniversary was celebrated in 2006 with a gala concert in which tributes were paid to Joan Sutherland and Richard Bonynge, the principal artists, the chorus, production staff and the Australian Opera and Ballet Orchestra (the AOBO) for their "artistry and talent" and the "ensemble nature" of the company. In mid-2008, Hickox and Opera Australia were criticised by a singer for what she perceived as a decline in artistic standards since the start of Hickox's tenure. The board expressed complete confidence in Hickox. On returning to the UK in November 2008 following the Sydney winter season, Hickox died suddenly from a heart attack after conducting a rehearsal in Swansea. On 30 June 2009, Lyndon Terracini was announced as the new artistic director.

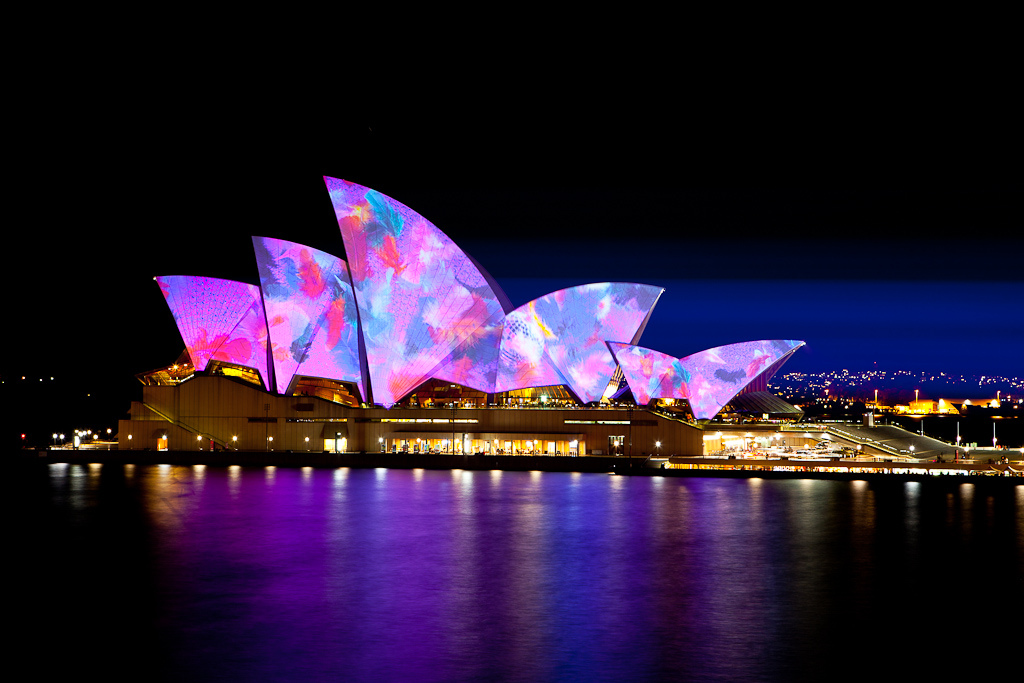
Sydney Opera House, 2010

=== "Change for survival" ===
In 2011, Terracini gave a controversial speech as part of the annual Peggy Glanville-Hicks Address, in which he announced that Opera Australia had to change in order to survive. "Opera companies and orchestras of significance world wide are closing at an alarming rate ... We can blithely ignore the fact ... or we can change ... brave programming is having the courage to programme what critics will criticise you for, but will make a genuine connection to a real audience."

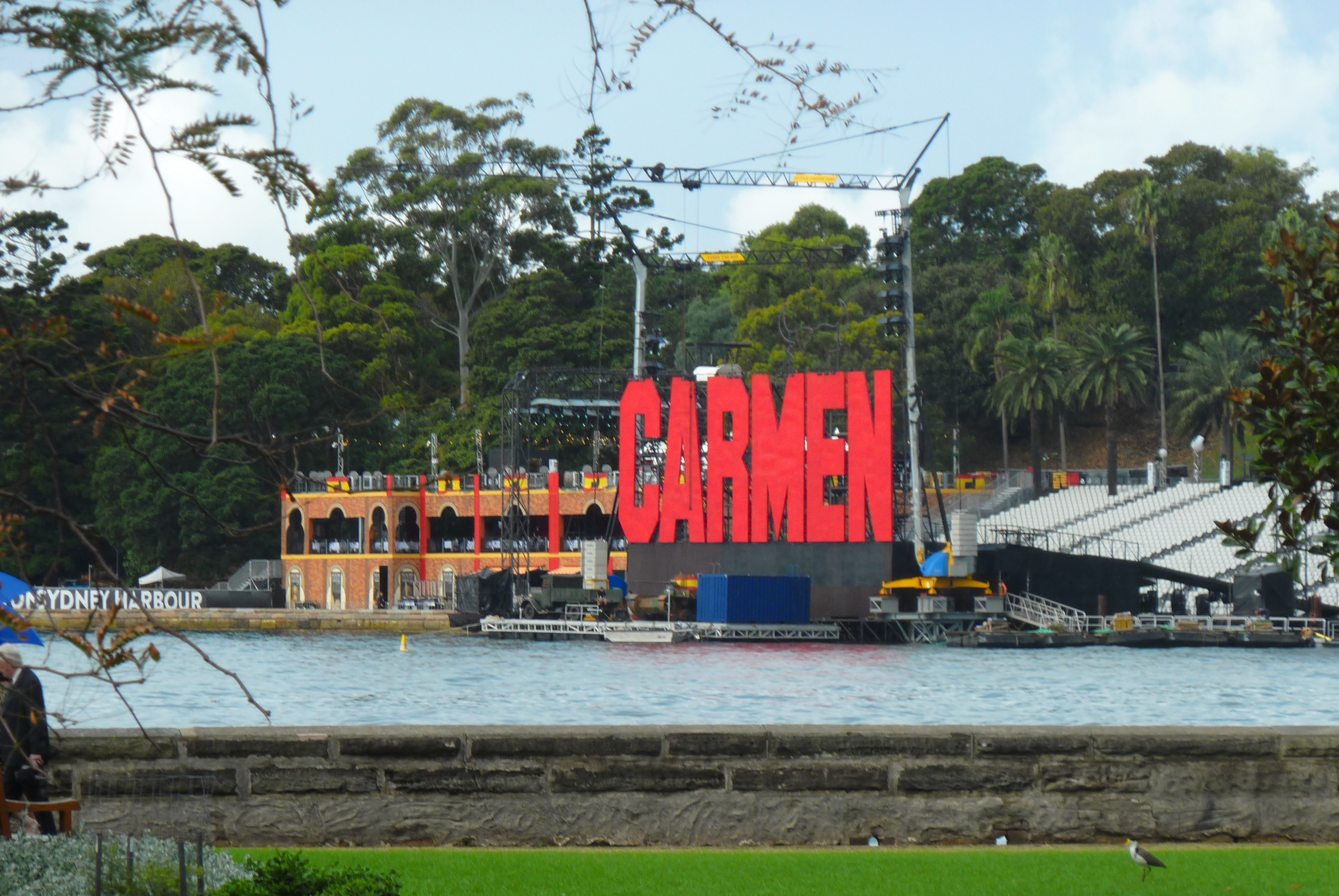
Stage of Handa Opera on Sydney Harbour 2013

Terracini pursued a program designed to bring opera to wider audiences. In 2012 through the sponsorship of Haruhisa Handa and Destination NSW, Opera Australia staged the first Handa Opera on Sydney Harbour, a three-week season of a fully produced and staged opera, designed to be an opera "event". The production of La traviata was directed by Francesca Zambello and attracted an audience of 40,000 people. In 2013, Opera Australia staged an open-air production of Carmen on Sydney Harbour, directed by Gale Edwards. It reached similar audience numbers. The harbour has since received annual stagings, followed by Madama Butterfly (2014), Aida (2015), and Turandot (2016), a new production of Carmen in 2017, La bohème (2018), West Side Story (2019), La Traviata (2020, 2021), The Phantom of the Opera (2022), Madama Butterfly (2023), West Side Story (2024), Guys & Dolls (2025).

In 2012, Opera Australia replaced the regular Gilbert and Sullivan productions that had formed part of the company's repertoire for some years with a series of Broadway musicals. A Lincoln Center Theatre production of South Pacific played at the Sydney Opera House and Melbourne's Princess Theatre in 2012, kicking off a national tour which continued in 2013.

An extensive philanthropic drive enabled the company to program its first full-length Ring Cycle, which was performed in Melbourne over four weeks at the end of 2013. After tickets to the event sold out in just one day, ABC Classic FM and Opera Australia announced the radio station would live broadcast the Ring Cycle to audiences across the country.

In April 2013, Opera Australia announced a 44 per cent growth in total revenue based on an increase in box office sales of more than 55 per cent. For the second year in a row, the company reported an operating profit following two successive deficits.

In January 2013, the board of Opera Australia announced they would extend Lyndon Terracini's contract as artistic director for five more years. Later that year, Terracini announced that singers on 12-month contracts will be "rested" without pay for a period of six to twelve weeks in 2014.

Terracini resigned in October 2022 and in December Opera Australia announced Welsh-born Jo Davies as his replacement. She was the first woman to be appointed artistic director of the company, but left in August 2024, following "differences of opinion" with the CEO.

=== Educational outreach ===
Oz Opera was established after the merger of the AO with the VSO in 1996 with Lindy Hume as its director. Its aim is to present opera to audiences throughout metropolitan and regional Australia. It presents performances in primary schools across New South Wales and Victoria, adapting large-scale scores to suit young audiences.

Oz Opera, now called Opera Australia Touring and Outreach (Opera Australia's education, access and development arm), presented the La bohème production in Victoria, the Northern Territory and Western Australia, attended by 13,350 people, while OzOpera's Schools Company performed to over 63,500 primary age children in more than 360 performances in urban and regional New South Wales and Victoria. Since then the touring and outreach arm of the company has performed to a great many more people around Australia and toured other states, including South Australia, Queensland and Tasmania.

=== Modern Australian opera ===
Opera Australia is committed to the long-term development and performance of modern Australian operas. Since 1974, OA has fully staged 12 new Australian operas and workshopped over 20 new works in various stages of development. The main new works staged by the company have been The Little Mermaid by Anne Boyd (1985); Metamorphosis by Brian Howard (1985); Voss by Richard Meale (1986); Whitsunday by Howard (1988); Mer de glace by Richard Meale (1992); The Golem by Larry Sitsky (1993); The Eighth Wonder by Alan John (1995); Summer of the Seventeenth Doll by Richard Mills (1999); Batavia by Richard Mills (2001); Love in the Age of Therapy by Paul Grabowsky (OzOpera 2002); Lindy by Moya Henderson (2003); Madeline Lee by John Haddock (2004); Bliss (2010) by Brett Dean; and The Rabbits by Kate Miller Heidke (2015). In 2015, OA produced the television opera The Divorce by Elena Kats-Chernin and Joanna Murray-Smith based on an original idea by Terracini for ABC Television.

=== Digital strategy ===
In 2011, Opera Australia launched a digital strategy in order to bring high-definition recordings of its operas to cinemas (in collaboration with CinemaLive), as well as launching DVD, Blu-ray and CD releases on its own label and broadcasting these recordings on ABC Television.

== Awards and nominations ==
=== ARIA Music Awards ===
The ARIA Music Awards is an annual awards ceremony that recognises excellence, innovation, and achievement across all genres of Australian music. They commenced in 1987.

Year	Nominee / work	Award	Result	Ref.
1988	Voss	Best Classical Album	Won	
1992	Mozart Arias & Scenes	Best Classical Album	Nominated	
1994	Puccini: La bohème	Best Original Soundtrack, Cast or Show Album	Nominated	
1999	Hansel & Gretel (with Christine Douglas & Suzanne Johnston)	Best Original Soundtrack, Cast or Show Album	Nominated	
2000	Amoureuse: Sacred and Profane Arias (with Rosamund Illing, Richard Bonynge and Ballet Orchestra)	Best Classical Album	Nominated	
2002	Verdi: Requiem (with Simone Young)	Best Original Soundtrack, Cast or Show Album	Nominated	
2015	Bliss	Best Original Soundtrack, Cast or Show Album	Nominated	
2016	This Kiss (with Nicole Car, Ballet Orchestra and Andrea Molino)	Best Classical Album	Nominated	

== Home media ==
Opera Australia has released numerous video recordings, on VHS, DVD and Blu-ray, of whole productions and of thematic selections, including:

- Handa Opera on Sydney Harbour — The Collection: boxed set of five complete operas: Carmen, La Traviata, Aida, Madama Butterfly, and Turandot.
- Opera Australia Favorites: two-DVD set of highlights, including performances by Cheryl Barker, Monique Brynnel, Joan Carden, Christine Douglas, Lauris Elms, Glenys Fowles, Robert Gard, Richard Greager, David Hobson, Marilyn Horne, Rosamund Illing, Fiona Janes, Suzanne Johnston, Yvonne Kenny, Eva Marton, Leona Mitchell, Luciano Pavarotti, John Pringle, Neil Rosenshein, Ghillian Sullivan, Joan Sutherland, Huguette Tourangeau, Victoria Vergara, and John Wegner.
- Stars of Opera Australia (2014): popular arias and duets from various OA productions, including the 2013 Handa opera La traviata
