= Helpmann Award for Best Male Performer in an Opera =

Annual Australian opera award

The Helpmann Award for Best Male Performer in an Opera is an award presented by Live Performance Australia (LPA) (the trade name for the Australian Entertainment Industry Association (AEIA)), an employers' organisation which serves as the peak body in the live entertainment and performing arts industries in Australia. The accolade is handed out at the annual Helpmann Awards, which celebrates achievements in musical theatre, contemporary music, comedy, opera, classical music, theatre, dance and physical theatre.

== Winners and nominees ==
In the following list winners are listed first and marked in gold, in boldface, and the nominees are listed below with no highlight.

Winners are listed first and marked in a separate colour, in boldface.

Year	Actor	Production	Character(s)
**2001** (1st)
**2001** (1st)	**Grant Smith**	**The Eighth Wonder**	**The Architect**
**2001** (1st)	Jonathan Summers	Simon Boccanegra	Simone Boccanegra
**2001** (1st)	Jonathan Summers	Wozzeck	Wozzeck
**2001** (1st)	Timothy DuFore	Così fan tutte	Guglielmo
**2002** (2nd)
**2002** (2nd)	**Jonathan Summers**	**Parsifal**	**Amfortas**
**2002** (2nd)	Glenn Winslade	Lohengrin	Lohengrin
**2002** (2nd)	Angus Wood	The Gypsy Princess	Count Boni Káncsiánu
**2002** (2nd)	Bruce Martin	Batavia	Francisco Pelsaert
**2003** (3rd)
**2003** (3rd)	**Peter Rose**	**Der Rosenkavalier**	**Baron Ochs auf Lerchenau**
**2003** (3rd)	Glen Winsdale	Lohengrin	Lohengrin
**2003** (3rd)	Julian Gavin	Andrea Chénier	Andrea Chénier
**2003** (3rd)	Michael Lewis	Il trovatore	Count di Luna
2004 (4th)
2004 (4th)	**Teddy Tahu Rhodes**	**Dead Man Walking**	**Joseph De Rocher**
2004 (4th)	Dennis O'Neill	Cavalleria rusticana	Turiddu
2004 (4th)	Dennis O'Neill	Pagliacci	Canio
2004 (4th)	Jonathan Summers	Otello	Iago
2005 (5th)
2005 (5th)	**John Wegner**	**The Ring Cycle**	**Wotan**
2005 (5th)	Peter Rose	Der Rosenkavalier	Baron Ochs
2005 (5th)	Michael Lewis	Madeline Lee	The Major
2005 (5th)	Peter Coleman-Wright	Tosca	Baron Scarpia
2006 (6th)
2006 (6th)	**Philip Langridge**	**Death in Venice**	**Gustav von Aschenbach**
2006 (6th)	Teddy Tahu Rhodes	Don Giovanni	Don Giovanni
2006 (6th)	David Walker	Flight	Refugee
2007 (7th)
2007 (7th)	**Jonathan Summers**	**Rigoletto**	**Rigoletto**
2007 (7th)	Adam Goodburn	Satyagraha	Mahatma Gandhi
2007 (7th)	Julian Gavin	Rusalka	The prince
2007 (7th)	Tobias Cole	Giulio Cesare	Giulio Cesare
2008 (8th)
2008 (8th)	**Teddy Tahu Rhodes**	**Dead Man Walking**	**Joseph De Rocher**
2008 (8th)	John Wegner	Les Contes d'Hoffmann	Miracle, Dapertutto
2008 (8th)	Peter Coleman-Wright	Arabella	Mandryka
2008 (8th)	Jonathan Summers	Il trittico	Luigi
2009 (9th)
2009 (9th)	**John Wegner**	**Billy Budd**	**John Claggart**
2009 (9th)	Philip Langridge	Billy Budd	Captain Vere
2009 (9th)	Jonathan Summers	Otello	Iago
2009 (9th)	David Hansen	The Coronation of Poppea	Nerone
2010 (10th)
2010 (10th)	**Stuart Skelton**	**Peter Grimes**	**Peter Grimes**
2010 (10th)	John Wegner	Tosca	Baron Scarpia
2010 (10th)	John Wegner	The Flying Dutchman	The Dutchman
2010 (10th)	Peter Coleman-Wright	Bliss	Harry Joy
2011 (11th)
2011 (11th)	**John Wegner**	**La fanciulla del West**	**Jack Rance**
2011 (11th)	Peter Coleman-Wright	The Marriage of Figaro	Count Almaviva
2011 (11th)	Teddy Tahu Rhodes	Tosca	Baron Scarpia
2011 (11th)	John Bolton-Wood	The Bear	Grigory Stephanovich Smirnov
2012 (12th)
2012 (12th)	**Anthony Dean Griffey**	**Of Mice and Men**	**Lenny Small**
2012 (12th)	Jay Hunter Morris	Moby-Dick	Captain Ahab
2012 (12th)	Rosario La Spina	Turandot	Calàf
2012 (12th)	Gianluca Terranova	La traviata	Alfredo Germont
2013 (13th)
2013 (13th)	**John Wegner**	**Salome**	**John the Baptist**
2013 (13th)	Dmytro Popov	Carmen	Don José
2013 (13th)	Giorgio Caoduro	Lucia di Lammermoor	Lord Enrico Ashton
2013 (13th)	Byron Watson	Midnight Son	Ray
2014 (14th)
2014 (14th)	**Terje Stensvold**	**Melbourne Ring Cycle**	**Wotan/ The Wanderer**
2014 (14th)	Yonghoon Lee	Tosca	Mario Cavaradossi
2014 (14th)	Riccardo Massi	La Forza del Destino	Don Alvaro
2014 (14th)	Barry Ryan	Nixon in China	Richard Nixon
2014 (14th)	Stefan Vinke	Melbourne Ring Cycle	Siegfried and The Rhinemaidens
2015 (15th)
2015 (15th)	Michael Fabiano	Faust	Faust
2015 (15th)	Adam Diegel	Madama Butterfly	Pinkerton
2015 (15th)	Christopher Purves	The Perfect American	Walt Disney
2015 (15th)	Teddy Tahu Rhodes	Don Giovanni	Don Giovanni
2015 (15th)	Claudio Sgura	Tosca	Scarpia
2016 (16th)
2016 (16th)	Carlo Vistoli	Agrippina	
2016 (16th)	Andrei Bondarenko	The Marriage of Figaro	Il Conte
2016 (16th)	Ferruccio Furlanetto	Don Carlos	Philip II
2016 (16th)	Yonghoon Lee	Turandot	Calaf
2017 (17th)
2017 (17th)	Christopher Purves	Saul	Saul
2017 (17th)	Michael Honeyman	King Roger	King Roger
2017 (17th)	Yonghoon Lee	Carmen	Don Jose
2017 (17th)	George Petean	Simon Boccanegra	Boccanegra
2018 (18th)
2018 (18th)	Allan Clayton	Hamlet	Hamlet
2018 (18th)	Kanen Breen	Black Rider: The Casting of the Magic Bullets	Wilhelm
2018 (18th)	Ferruccio Furlanetto	Don Quichotte	Don Quichotte
2018 (18th)	Barry Ryan	The Cunning Little Vixen	Forester
2019 (19th)
2019 (19th)	Michael Honeyman	Wozzeck	Wozzeck
2019 (19th)	Aaron Blake	The Magic Flute	Tamino
2019 (19th)	Michael Fabiano	Werther	Werther
2019 (19th)	David Hansen	Artaserse	Arbace
2019 (19th)	Simon Lobelson	Metamorphosis	Gregor
