= 12th Helpmann Awards =

2012 Australian live performance awards

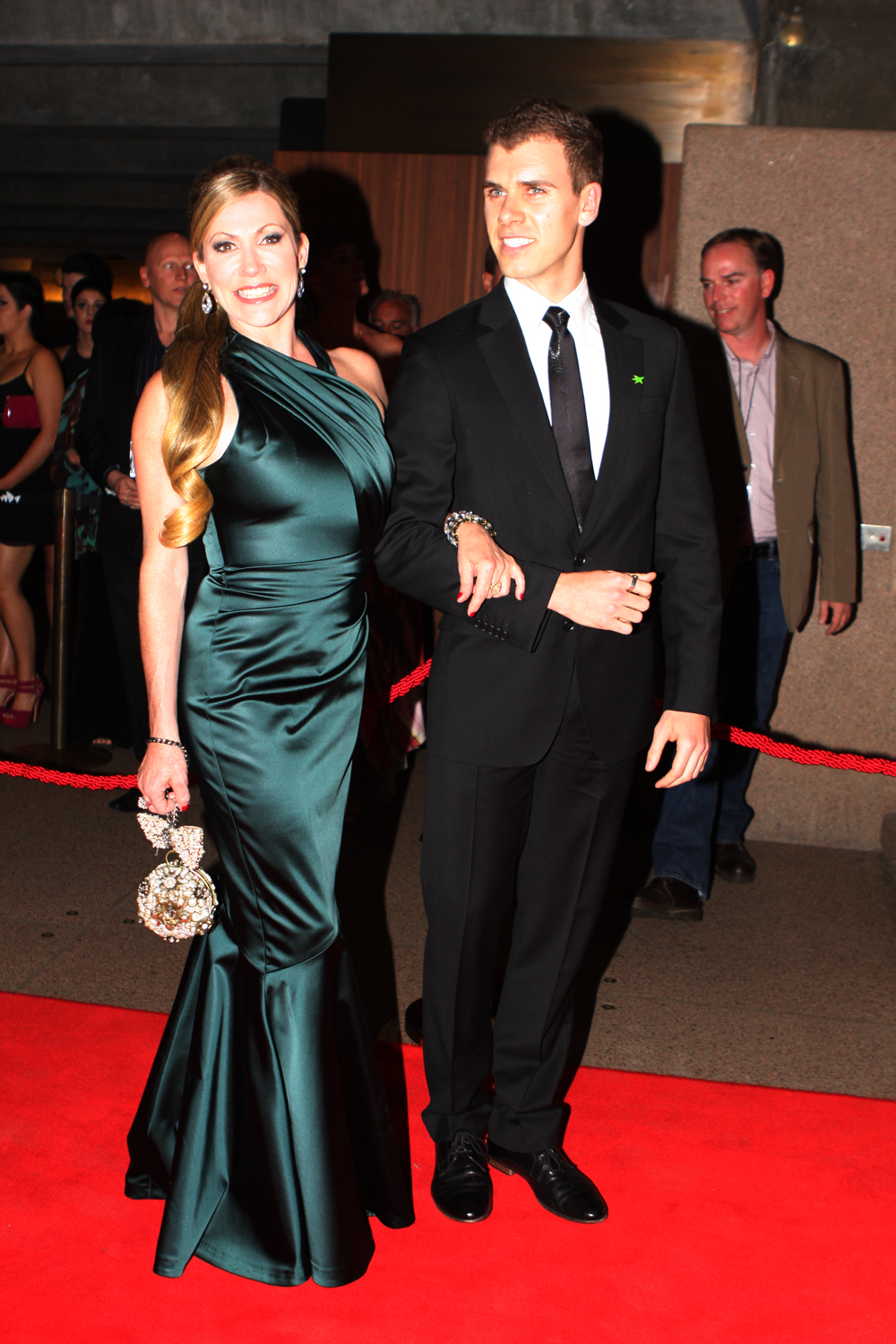
- Anita Louise Combe at the Helpmann Awards, 2012
- Date: 24 September 2012
- Location: Sydney Opera House, Sydney, New South Wales
- Hosted by: Simon Burke

Television/radio coverage
- Network: STUDIO

The 12th Annual Helpmann Awards was held on 24 September 2012 at the Sydney Opera House, in Sydney, New South Wales. Administered by Live Performance Australia (LPA), accolades were presented for achievements in disciplines of Australia's live performance sectors, for productions during the season between 1 March 2011 – 31 May 2012.

Awards were handed out in forty-two categories for achievements in theatre, musicals, opera, ballet, dance and concerts.

With the 2012 edition, LPA established the Helpmann Awards Travel Fund which seeks to provide a greater opportunity for productions outside of Melbourne and Sydney to become Nominated for an Award. The Fund provides travel assistance to members of the voting panel, allowing them to attend productions outside of their home states.

== Schedule ==
Date	Deadline
Monday, 13 August 2012	Helpmann Awards nomination announcement and media launch
Monday, 24 September 2012	12th Annual Helpmann Awards ceremony at the Sydney Opera House

== Winners and nominees ==
In the following tables, winners are listed first and highlighted in boldface.

=== Theatre ===
Best Play	Best Direction of a Play
**Ganesh Versus the Third Reich – Back to Back Theatre, Malthouse Theatre and Melbourne Festival**; Neighbourhood Watch – Belvoir; The Boys – Griffin Theatre Company in association with Sydney Festival; The Importance of Being Earnest – Melbourne Theatre Company	**Benedict Andrews – Gross und Klein (Big and Small) (Sydney Theatre Company)**; Rachael Maza Long – Jack Charles V The Crown (ILBIJERRI Theatre Company); Simon Phillips – Songs For Nobodies (Melbourne Theatre Company in association with Duet); Sam Strong – The Boys
Best Female Actor in a Play	Best Male Actor in a Play
**Cate Blanchett – Gross und Klein (Big and Small)**; Robyn Nevin – Neighbourhood Watch; Bernadette Robinson – Songs For Nobodies; Helen Thomson – Summer of the Seventeenth Doll (Belvoir)	**Paul Capsis – Angela's Kitchen (Griffin Theatre Company)**; Bille Brown – The Histrionic (Malthouse Theatre & Sydney Theatre Company); Jack Charles – Jack Charles V The Crown; Colin Friels – Red (Melbourne Theatre Company)
Best Female Actor in a Supporting Role in a Play	Best Male Actor in a Supporting Role in a Play
**Robyn Nevin – Summer of the Seventeenth Doll**; Justine Clarke – Les liaisons dangereuses (Sydney Theatre Company); Kris McQuade – Neighbourhood Watch; Miranda Otto – The White Guard (Sydney Theatre Company)	**Bob Hornery – The Importance of Being Earnest (Melbourne Theatre Company)**; Patrick Brammall – Clybourne Park (Melbourne Theatre Company); Alex Menglet – Julius Caesar (Bell Shakespeare); Trevor Stuart – As You Like It (La Boite Theatre Company)

=== Musicals ===
Best Musical
**A Chorus Line – Tim Lawson in association with the Adelaide Festival Centre**; An Officer and a Gentleman – Sharleen Cooper Cohen & John Frost; Rock of Ages – Rodney Rigby^{[A]}; Grey Gardens – The Production Company
Best Direction of a Musical	Best Choreography in a Musical
**Roger Hodgman – Grey Gardens**; Michael Bennett – A Chorus Line; Kristin Hanggi – Rock of Ages; Simon Phillips – An Officer and a Gentleman	**Kelly Devine – Rock of Ages**; Kelly Aykers – Annie (John Frost, Power Arts, QPAC and Two Left Feet Productions); Michael Bennett – A Chorus Line; Andrew Hallsworth – An Officer and a Gentleman
Best Female Actor in a Musical	Best Male Actor in a Musical
**Pamela Rabe – Grey Gardens**; Anita Louise Combe – A Chorus Line; Amanda Harrison – An Officer and a Gentleman; Amy Lehpamer – Rock of Ages	**Mitchell Butel – The Mikado (Opera Australia)**; Trevor Ashley – Fat Swan (Showqueen Productions); Justin Burford – Rock of Ages; Anthony Warlow – Annie
Best Female Actor in a Supporting Role in a Musical	Best Male Actor in a Supporting Role in a Musical
**Nancye Hayes – Grey Gardens**; Francine Cain – Rock of Ages; Debora Krizak – A Chorus Line; Tara Morice – Fat Swan	**Bert LaBonte – An Officer and a Gentleman**; Euan Doidge – A Chorus Line; Brent Hill – Rock of Ages; Todd McKenney – Annie

=== Opera ===
Best Opera	Best Direction of an Opera
**Moby-Dick – State Opera of South Australia**; The Barbarians – MONA FOMA and IHOS Opera; The Rake's Progress – Victorian Opera; Elektra – West Australian Opera, ThinIce, Perth International Arts Festival and Opera Australia	**Leonard Foglia – Moby-Dick**; Bruce Beresford – Of Mice and Men (Opera Australia); Matthew Lutton – Elektra; Francesca Zambello – La Traviata - Handa Opera on Sydney Harbour (Opera Australia)
Best Female Performer in an Opera	Best Male Performer in an Opera
**Emma Matthews – La Traviata - Handa Opera on Sydney Harbour**; Rachelle Durkin – The Tales of Hoffmann (West Australian Opera); Susan Foster – Turandot (Opera Australia); Eva Johansson – Elektra	**Anthony Dean Griffey – Of Mice and Men**; Jay Hunter Morris – Moby-Dick; Rosario La Spina – Turandot; Gianluca Terranova – La Traviata - Handa Opera on Sydney Harbour
Best Female Performer in a Supporting Role in an Opera	Best Male Performer in a Supporting Role in an Opera
**Orla Boylan – Elektra**; Lorina Gore – Moby-Dick; Suzanne Johnston – Albert Herring (Victorian Opera); Dominica Matthews – The Marriage of Figaro (Opera Australia)	**Grant Doyle – Moby-Dick**; James Clayton – The Tales of Hoffmann; Conal Coad – The Marriage of Figaro; Douglas McNicol – The Girl of the Golden West (Opera Queensland)

=== Dance and Physical Theatre ===
Best Ballet or Dance Work	Best Visual or Physical Theatre Production
**Can We Talk About This? – DV8 Theatre and Sydney Opera House, co-produced by Theatre de la Ville and Festival d'Automne Paris, National Theatre of Great Britain and Dansens Hus Stockholm**; Aviary: A Suite for the Bird – Phillip Adams BalletLab in Melbourne Festival; Mass – Dancenorth; Anatomy of an Afternoon – Martin del Amo, Performing Lines and Sydney Festival	**Circa – Circa**; Raoul – La Compagnie du Hanneton presented by Perth International Arts Festival; The Adventures of Alvin Sputnik: Deep Sea Explorer by Tim Watts – Perth Theatre Company presents a Weeping Spoon production; The Man the Sea Saw by Wolfe Bowart – SpoonTree Productions
Best Choreography in a Ballet or Dance Work
**Stephen Page – ID from Belong (Bangarra Dance Theatre)**; Phillip Adams – Aviary: A Suite for the Bird; Danielle Micich – Driving into Walls; Lloyd Newson – Can We Talk About This?
Best Male Dancer in a Ballet or Dance Work	Best Female Dancer in a Ballet or Dance Work
**Paul White – Anatomy of an Afternoon**; Waangenga Blanco – Belong (Bangarra Dance Theatre); Daryl Brandwood – HELIX (The HELIX Project); Chen Wen – 2 One Another (Sydney Dance Company)	**Charmene Yap – 2 One Another (Sydney Dance Company)**; Kirstie McCracken – Double Think (Force Majeure and Arts House in association with Melbourne Festival); Tara Soh – Proximity (Australian Dance Theatre); Brooke Stamp – Aviary: A Suite for the Bird

=== Classical music ===
Best Symphony Orchestra Concert	Best Chamber and Instrumental Ensemble Concert
**Evgeny Kissin Plays Chopin – Sydney Symphony Orchestra**; Master 3, Fire Music – Adelaide Symphony Orchestra; Schubert's Great C Major: Signature Sound – Sydney Symphony Orchestra; Beethoven's Pastoral Symphony – Australian Chamber Orchestra	**Tafelmusik - 'The Galileo Project: Music of the Spheres' – Musica Viva Australia**; KURSK: An Oratorio Requiem – Melbourne Festival and Melbourne Recital Centre; Syzygy Ensemble – Black Angels – Melbourne Recital Centre & Syzygy Ensemble; Evgeny Kissin – Sydney Symphony & Brisbane Festival
Best Individual Classical Performance
**Evgeny Kissin** (Sydney Symphony and Brisbane Festival); Matthias Goerne – Die Winterreise (Melbourne Recital Centre); Susan Graham – The Tempest (Melbourne Recital Centre and Sydney Opera House); Anne-Sophie Mutter – Beethoven with the Sydney Symphony Orchestra (Sydney Symphony)

=== Contemporary Music ===
Best International Contemporary Concert	Best Australian Contemporary Concert
**Prince – Prince Welcome 2 Australia**; Foo Fighters – Foo Fighters with special guests Tenacious D Stadium Tour 2011; Roger Waters – Roger Waters' The Wall Live; Sade – Sade Live	**Kylie Minogue – Aphrodite: Les Folies Tour**; Cold Chisel – Light the Nitro Tour; Keith Urban – Get Closer 2011 World Tour; Kylie Minogue – Anti Tour
Best Contemporary Music Festival
**MONA FOMA**; Future Music Festival (Australian tour); The 23rd Annual Bluesfest Byron Bay; Vivid Live 2011 curated by Stephen Pavlovic

=== Other ===
Best Presentation for Children	Best Regional Touring Production
**Boats – Terrapin Puppet Theatre**; White – Arts Centre Melbourne, Sydney Opera House, Adelaide Festival Centre, Windmill Theatre Company and Casula Powerhouse Arts Centre; The Red Tree – Barking Gecko Theatre Company and Perth International Arts Festival; Statespeare – shake & stir theatre co	**Namatjira – Big hART**; Julius Caesar – Bell Shakespeare; Africa – My Darling Patricia, Marguerite Pepper Productions, Performing Lines; Rainbow's End – Riverside Productions
Best Cabaret Performer	Best Comedy Performer
**Meow Meow – Little Match Girl (Malthouse Theatre in association with Meow Meow Revolution)**; Trevor Ashley – Diamonds are for Trevor (Showqueen Productions, Luckiest Productions and Sydney Gay and Lesbian Mardi Gras); Moira Finucane, with Rhonda Burchmore, Deborah Conway, Die Roten Punkte, Pamela Rabe, Phillip Adams' BalletLab, Meow Meow, Vika and Linda Bull, Kamahi Djordon King as Constantina Bush & The Bushettes, Sosina Wogayehu and Burlesque Hour artistes Maude Davey, Holly Durant and Harriet Ritchie – Finucane & Smith's Burlesque Hour LOVES Melbourne (Finucane & Smith, fortyfivedownstairs, Auspicious Arts); Caroline Nin – Caroline Nin - Hymne A Piaf (Melbourne Recital Centre)	**Tim Minchin – Tim Minchin vs The Orchestras Round II (Fox in the Snow)**; Wil Anderson – Wilarious (Token Events); Judith Lucy – Nothing Fancy (Token Events); Sam Simmons – About The Weather (Token Events)
Best Special Event
**La traviata - Handa Opera on Sydney Harbour – Opera Australia**; **Place Des Anges by Les Studios De Cirque – Perth International Arts Festival**

=== Industry ===
Best New Australian Work
**Paul Capsis, Julian Meyrick & Hilary Bell – Angela's Kitchen**; David Chisholm – Kursk: An Oratorio Requiem; Mark Deans, Marcia Ferguson, Bruce Gladwin, Nicki Holland, Simon Laherty, Sarah Mainwaring, Scott Price, Kate Sulan, Brian Tilley & David Woods – Ganesh Versus the Third Reich; Elena Kats-Chernin – Symphonia Eluvium; Joanna Murray-Smith – Songs For Nobodies
Best Original Score	Best Musical Direction
**David Page** and **Steve Francis – Belong (Bangarra Dance Theatre)**; Clint Bracknell, David Salvaire and Dylan Hooper – The Red Tree; Jake Heggie – Moby-Dick; Alan John – The White Guard	**Iain Grandage – Little Match Girl**; Ian McDonald – Songs For Nobodies; Richard Mills – Elektra; Timothy Sexton – Moby-Dick
Best Costume Design	Best Scenic Design
**Toni Matičevski** and **Richard Nylon – Aviary: A Suite for the Bird**; Laurel Frank – Steampowered (Circus Oz); Akira Isogawa – Romeo and Juliet (The Australian Ballet); Tony Tripp and Tracy Grant Lord – The Importance of Being Earnest	**Brian Thomson – La traviata - Handa Opera on Sydney Harbour**; Robert Brill – Moby-Dick; Gypsy Taylor – The Red Tree; Tony Tripp and Richard Roberts – The Importance of Being Earnest
Best Lighting Design	Best Sound Design
**Paul Jackson – Little Match Girl**; Paul Jackson – Elektra; Matthew Marshall – The Red Tree; Nick Schlieper – Gross und Klein (Big and Small)	**Tony David Cray – La traviata - Handa Opera on Sydney Harbour**; Gareth Fry – Kevin Spacey: Richard III (THE BRIDGE PROJECT, produced by The Old Vic, BAM & Neal Street, Australian Season presented by Andrew Kay & Liza McLean); Peter Hylenski – Dreamworks How To Train Your Dragon Arena Spectacular (DreamWorks Animation and Global Creatures); Bryan Worthen – Foo Fighters with special guests Tenacious D Stadium Tour 2011 (Foo Fighters and The Frontier Touring Company)

== Special awards ==
The JC Williamson Award, a lifetime achievement award, was awarded to the late Indigenous Australian musician Jimmy Little (1 March 1937 – 2 April 2012) and Katharine Brisbane, a theatre journalist and publisher. The Brian Stacey Award, for emerging conductors of live theatre, opera and ballet, was given to Daniel Carter.

== See also ==
- 66th Tony Awards
- 2012 Laurence Olivier Awards

== Notes ==
A: The full producing credit for Rock of Ages is Rodney Rigby, Michael Cohl, Reagan Silber, Peter Gordon, Barry Habib, Matthew Weaver, Scott Prisand, Carl Levin, Jeff Davis, S2BN Entertainment in association with Janet Billing Rich, Sar Mercer, Michael Minarik, Mariano Tolentino and Hilary Weaver.
