= Helpmann Award for Best Cabaret Performer =

Annual Australian award

The Helpmann Award for Best Cabaret Performer is an award, presented at the annual Helpmann Awards since 2010. It recognises excellence in cabaret performance in Australia by a performer and/or group in a work created or co-created by the performer/group.

== Winners and nominees ==
Winners are listed first and marked in a separate colour, in boldface. Nominees are listed with no highlight.

Year	Performer(s)	Production
**2010** (10th)
**2010** (10th)	**iOTA**	**Smoke and Mirrors**
**2010** (10th)	Moira Finucane	The Burlesque Hour
**2010** (10th)	Meow Meow	Meow to the World: Crisis is Born (Again)
**2010** (10th)	Paul Capsis, Martin Martini, Le Gateau Chocolat, Lady Carol, Christine Johnston and Simone Page Jones	A Company of Strangers
**2011** (11th)
**2011** (11th)	**Eddie Perfect**	**Misanthropology**
**2011** (11th)	Moira Finucane (with Maude Davey, Caroline Lee, Paul Cordeiro, Toni Lamond, Shirley Cattunar, Brian Lucas, Sosina Wogayehu, Derek Ives, Azaria Universe, Harriet Ritchie, Holly Durant, Lily Paskas, Carolyn Connors, Lois Olney, Yumi Umiumare, David Pidd, Margaret Dobson and Yvette Coppersmith)	Finucane and Smith's Carnival of Mysteries
**2011** (11th)	Ursula Yovich	Magpie Blues
**2011** (11th)	Paul Capsis	Paul Capsis - Make Me a King
**2012** (12th)
**2012** (12th)	**Meow Meow**	**Little Match Girl**
**2012** (12th)	Trevor Ashley	Diamonds are for Trevor
**2012** (12th)	Moira Finucane, with Rhonda Burchmore, Deborah Conway, Die Roten Punkte, Pamela Rabe, Phillip Adams' BalletLab, Meow Meow, Vika and Linda Bull, Kamahi Djordon King as Constantina Bush & The Bushettes, Sosina Wogayehu and Burlesque Hour artistes Maude Davey, Holly Durant and Harriet Ritchie	Finucane & Smith's Burlesque Hour LOVES Melbourne
**2012** (12th)	Caroline Nin	Hymne A Piaf
**2013** (13th)
**2013** (13th)	**Robyn Archer**	**Robyn Archer in Concert: QUE RESTE-T-IL?**
**2013** (13th)	Tommy Bradson	The Men My Mother Loved
**2013** (13th)	Christopher Green	TINA C: Sorry Seems to be the Hardest Word
**2013** (13th)	Mark Nadler	I'm A Stranger Here Myself
**2014** (14th)
**2014** (14th)	**Sarah Ward**	**Yana Alana Between the Cracks**
**2014** (14th)	Jerick Hoffer (as Jinkx Monsoon)	The Vaudevillians starring Jinkx Monsoon
**2014** (14th)	Lady Rizo	Lady Rizo
**2014** (14th)	Tommy Bradson	REG
**2015** (15th)
**2015** (15th)	**Camille O'Sullivan**	**Camille O'Sullivan - Changeling**
**2015** (15th)	David Campbell & John Bucchino	David Campbell Sings John Bucchino
**2015** (15th)	Beccy Cole and Libby O'Donovan	The Cowgirl and The Showgirl
**2015** (15th)	Kim Smith	Nova Noir
**2016** (16th)
**2016** (16th)	**Michael Griffiths**	**Cole**
**2016** (16th)	Michaela Burger and Greg Wain	Exposing Edith
**2016** (16th)	Alan Cumming	Alan Cumming Sings Sappy Songs
**2016** (16th)	Phil Scott	Reviewing the Situation
**2017** (17th)
**2017** (17th)	**Hope Haami, Juanita Duncan, Ofa Fotu, Crystal Stacey, Alexis West, Ghenoa Gela, Lisa Fa'alafi and Kim 'Busty Beatz' Bowers**	**Hot Brown Honey**
**2017** (17th)	Jimmy Barnes	Working Class Boy: An Evening of Stories & Songs
**2017** (17th)	Betty Grumble	Grumble: Sex Clown Saves the World
**2017** (17th)	Sven Ratzke	Starman
**2018** (18th)
**2018** (18th)	**Taylor Mac**	**A 24-Decade History of Popular Music**
**2018** (18th)	Reuben Kaye	Journey to the Centre of Attention
**2018** (18th)	Queenie van de Zandt	BLUE: The Songs Of Joni Mitchell
**2018** (18th)	Briefs Ensemble	Briefs: Close Encounters
**2019** (19th)
**2019** (19th)	**Ali McGregor**	**Yma Sumac — The Peruvian Songbird**
**2019** (19th)	Michaela Burger	A Migrant's Son
**2019** (19th)	Libby O'Donovan	Kate Leigh — The Worst Woman in Sydney
**2019** (19th)	Dickie Beau	Re-Member Me

== See also ==
- Helpmann Awards
