= 11th Helpmann Awards =

2011 Australian live performance awards

- Date: 1 August 2011
- Location: Sydney Opera House

Television/radio coverage
- Network: Studio

The 11th Annual Helpmann Awards for live performance in Australia were held on 1 August 2011 at the Joan Sutherland Theatre, Sydney Opera House.

== Winners and nominees ==
In the following tables, winners are listed first and highlighted in boldface. The nominees are those which are listed below the winner and not in boldface

=== Theatre ===
Best Play	Best Direction of a Play
**The Wild Duck – Belvoir**; The Diary of a Madman – Belvoir; Do Not Go Gentle – fortyfivedownstairs; Uncle Vanya – Sydney Theatre Company in association with Bell Shakespeare	**Neil Armfield – The Diary of a Madman**; Benedict Andrews – Measure for Measure (Belvoir); Wesley Enoch – Waltzing the Wilarra (Yirra Yaakin Theatre Company); Simon Stone – The Wild Duck
Best Female Actor in a Play	Best Male Actor in a Play
**Cate Blanchett – Uncle Vanya**; Robin McLeavy – Measure for Measure; Robyn Nevin – Long Day's Journey into Night (Sydney Theatre Company and Artists Repertory Theatre); Ursula Yovich – Waltzing the Wilarra	**Geoffrey Rush – The Diary of a Madman**; Richard Roxburgh – Uncle Vanya; Toby Schmitz – Much Ado About Nothing (Bell Shakespeare); Lucas Stibbard – boy girl wall (The Escapists presented by La Boite)
Best Female Actor in a Supporting Role in a Play	Best Male Actor in a Supporting Role in a Play
**Anita Hegh – The Wild Duck**; Anne Phelan – Do Not Go Gentle; Yael Stone – The Diary of a Madman; Helen Thomson – In the Next Room, or The Vibrator Play (Sydney Theatre Company)	**Anthony Phelan – The Wild Duck**; John Bell – Uncle Vanya; Colin Moody – Measure for Measure; Dennis Olsen – Entertaining Mr Sloane (State Theatre Company of South Australia)

=== Musicals ===
Best Musical
**Mary Poppins – Disney and Cameron Mackintosh**; Doctor Zhivago – John Frost, Anita Waxman/Tom Dokton, Latitude Link, Power Arts, Chun-Soo Shin, Corcoran Productions; Love Never Dies – The Really Useful Company Asia Pacific and Arts Capital Trust; Hairspray – Paul Dainty, Dainty Group and Joel Pearlman, Roadshow Live
Best Direction of a Musical	Best Choreography in a Musical
**Richard Eyre and Matthew Bourne – Mary Poppins**; David Atkins – Hairspray; Des McAnuff – Doctor Zhivago; Simon Phillips – Love Never Dies	**Matthew Bourne and Stephen Mear – Mary Poppins**; Jason Coleman – Hairspray; Kelly Devine – Doctor Zhivago; Graeme Murphy – Love Never Dies
Best Female Actor in a Musical	Best Male Actor in a Musical
**Verity Hunt-Ballard – Mary Poppins**; Jaz Flowers – Hairspray; Lucy Maunder – Doctor Zhivago; Jemma Rix – Wicked (Marc Platt, David Stone, Universal Pictures, The Araca Group, Jon B. Platt and John Frost)	**Matt Lee – Mary Poppins**; David Harris – Wicked; Ben Lewis – Love Never Dies; Anthony Warlow – Doctor Zhivago
Best Female Actor in a Supporting Role in a Musical	Best Male Actor in a Supporting Role in a Musical
**Esther Hannaford – Hairspray**; Alinta Chidzey – West Side Story (Michael Brenner for BB Promotion GmbH, Howard Panter for Ambassador Theatre Group, The Bartner Group, Norman Tulchin, Lunchbox Theatrical Productions and David Atkins Enterprises); Marina Prior – Mary Poppins; Taneel Van Zyl – Doctor Zhivago	**Philip Quast – Mary Poppins**; Martin Crewes – Doctor Zhivago; Simon Gleeson – Love Never Dies; Scott Irwin – Hairspray

=== Opera and Classical Music ===
Best Opera	Best Direction of an Opera
**Partenope – Opera Australia**; La Fanciulla del West – Opera Australia; Maria de Buenos Aires – State Opera of South Australia and Leigh Warren & Dancers; The Threepenny Opera – Malthouse Theatre and Victorian Opera	**Nigel Jamieson – La Fanciulla del West**; Christopher Alden – Partenope; Michael Kantor – The Threepenny Opera; Leigh Warren – Maria de Buenos Aires
Best Female Performer in an Opera	Best Male Performer in an Opera
**Emma Matthews – Partenope**; Patricia Racette – Madama Butterfly (Opera Australia); Rinat Shaham – Carmen (Opera Australia); Rachelle Durkin – La Sonnambula (West Australian Opera)	**John Wegner – La Fanciulla del West**; Peter Coleman-Wright – The Marriage of Figaro (Opera Australia); Teddy Tahu Rhodes – Tosca (West Australian Opera); John Bolton Wood – The Bear (Victorian Opera)
Best Female Performer in a Supporting Role in an Opera	Best Male Performer in a Supporting Role in an Opera
**Elizabeth Campbell – Aida (State Opera of South Australia)**; Nicole Car – Carmen; Emma Pearson – Der Rosenkavalier (Opera Australia); Dimity Shepherd – The Threepenny Opera	**Kanen Breen – Partenope**; Andrew Collis – The Bear; Andrew Jones – La Boheme (Opera Australia); Douglas McNicol – Aida
Best Symphony Orchestra Concert	Best Chamber and/or Instrumental Ensemble Concert
**Berlin Philharmonic Orchestra – Sydney Opera House and the Perth Concert Hall**; Thomas Ades and Melbourne Symphony Orchestra – Melbourne Festival and Melbourne Symphony Orchestra; The Creation – Academy of Ancient Music presented by Perth International Arts Festival; Britten's War Requiem – Melbourne Symphony Orchestra	**Garrick Ohlsson in Recital as part of the Sydney Symphony International Pianists in Recital Series – Sydney Symphony**; Bach and Beyond – Australian Chamber Orchestra; The Rest Is Noise – Australian Chamber Orchestra; Scharoun Ensemble Berlin – Melbourne Recital Centre
Best Individual Classical Performance
**Sir Simon Rattle – Berlin Philharmonic Orchestra (Sydney Opera House and the Perth Concert Hall)**; Lilli Paasikivi – Mahler Song of the Earth with the Sydney Symphony (Sydney Symphony); Stuart Skelton – Mahler Song of the Earth with the Sydney Symphony (Sydney Symphony); Cecilia Bartoli – Cecilia Bartoli (Sydney Opera House, UMCMP & Andrew McManus Presents)

=== Dance and Physical Theatre ===
Best Ballet or Dance Work	Best Visual or Physical Theatre Production
**Where The Heart Is – Expressions Dance Company and Queensland Performing Arts Centre**; Amplification – BalletLab and Phillip Adams (with C.U.B Malthouse); Sutra – Sydney Opera House and Brisbane Festival; Vertical Road – Melbourne Festival and Akram Khan Company	**Not in a Million Years – Force Majeure**; Propaganda – HotHouse Theatre and Acrobat; Shanghai Lady Killer – Stalker Theatre presented by Brisbane Festival; Wunderkammer – Circa presented by Brisbane Festival
Best Choreography in a Dance or Physical Theatre Production
**Natalie Weir – Where the Heart Is**; Phillip Adams – Amplification; Akram Khan – Vertical Road; Frances Rings – Artefact (of earth & sky) (Bangarra Dance Theatre)
Best Female Dancer in a Dance or Physical Theatre Production	Best Male Dancer in a Dance or Physical Theatre Production
**Kristina Chan – In Glass (Sydney Opera House and Artful Management)**; Lucinda Dunn – Cinderella (The Australian Ballet); Madeleine Eastoe – Halcyon (The Australian Ballet); Brooke Stamp – Amplification	**Paul White – In Glass**; Richard Causer – Where the Heart Is; Robert Curran – Madame Butterfly (The Australian Ballet); Stuart Shugg – Human Interest Story (Lucy Guerin Inc, Malthouse Melbourne and Perth International Arts Festival)

=== Contemporary Music ===
Best Australian Contemporary Concert	Best Contemporary Music Festival
**Powderfinger – Sunsets The Farewell Tour – Powderfinger and Secret Service & Village Sounds**; The Church – "A Psychedelic Symphony" – 30th Anniversary Concert – Sydney Opera House Concert Hall – The Church and International Music Concepts (IMC) in association with MAX; Akira – Regurgitator and Sydney Opera House; Angus & Julia Stone "Down the Way Tour" – Angus & Julia Stone and International Music Concepts	**Splendor in the Grass 2010 – Village Sounds and Secret Service**; MONA FOMA 2011 – MONA – Museum of Old and New Art; Vivid Live 2010 – Sydney Opera House; Byron Bay Bluesfest – Peter Noble
Best International Contemporary Music Concert
**Leonard Cohen @ Hanging Rock – Leonard Cohen and Frontier Touring Company**; U2 360 Tour – U2 and Live Nation in association with Michael Coppel; Gorillaz 'Plastic Beach' Tour (Australia) – Gorillaz and Chugg Entertainment; Metallica World Magnetic Tour '10 – Metallica and Michael Coppel Presents; Sufjan Stevens – Sufjan Stevens and Sydney Festival

=== Other ===
Best Cabaret Performer	Best Comedy Performer
**Eddie Perfect – Misanthropology (Sydney Festival)**; Paul Capsis – Paul Capsis - Make Me a King (the Arts Centre and Deborah Tobias Creative Management); Moira Finucane (with Maude Davey, Caroline Lee, Paul Cordeiro, Toni Lamond, Shirley Cattunar, Brian Lucas, Sosina Wogayehu, Derek Ives, Azaria Universe, Harriet Ritchie, Holly Durant, Lily Paskas, Carolyn Connors, Lois Olney, Yumi Umiumare, David Pidd, Margaret Dobson and Yvette Coppersmith) – Finucane and Smith's Carnival of Mysteries (Melbourne Festival); Ursula Yovich – Magpie Blues (Melbourne Festival)	**Denise Scott – Regrets (Token Events)**; Wil Anderson – Man vs Wil (Token Events); Hannah Gadsby – Mrs Chuckles (Token Events); Tom Gleeson – Up Himself (Token Events)
Best Presentation for Children	Best Regional Touring Production
**Me and My Shadow – Patch Theatre Company**; Dinosaur Petting Zoo – Erth Visual & Physical presented by Ten Days on the Island; GRUG – Windmill Theatre and Queensland Performing Arts Centre's Out of the Box Festival; Wombat Stew – Garry Ginivan Attractions in association with Regional Arts Victoria	**Mathinna – Bangarra Dance Theatre**; Red Sky Morning – Red Stitch Actors Theatre and Performing Lines; Tuesdays with Morrie – Ensemble Productions; Untrained – Lucy Guerin Inc

=== Industry ===
Best New Australian Work
**Tim Minchin and Sydney Symphony – Tim Minchin vs Sydney Symphony (Sydney Symphony)**; Moira Finucane and Jackie Smith – Finucane and Smith's Carnival of Mysteries; Declan Greene – Moth (Malthouse Theatre and Arena Theatre Company); Eddie Perfect – Songs from the Middle (Sydney Opera House and ANAM in partnership with Melbourne Cabaret Festival); Lachlan Philpott – Silent Disco (Griffin Theatre, Australian Theatre for Young People and Hothouse Theatre); Natalie Weir – Where the Heart Is
Best Original Score	Best Music Direction
**Alan John – The Diary of a Madman**; David Milroy – Waltzing the Wilarra; Regurgitator – Akira (Sydney Opera House); John Rodgers – Where the Heart Is	**Stephen Brooker and Michael Tyack – Mary Poppins**; Christian Curnyn – Partenope; Guy Simpson – Love Never Dies; Ben Walsh – My Bicycle Loves You (Sydney Festival and Perth International Arts Festival)
Best Scenic Design	Best Costume Design
**Gabriela Tylesova – Love Never Dies**; Kim Carpenter – SNOW on MARS (Kim Carpenter's Theatre of Image and Sydney Festival); Bob Crowley – Mary Poppins; Brian Thomson – La Boheme (Opera Australia)	**Gabriela Tylesova – Love Never Dies**; Bob Crowley – Mary Poppins; Tracy Grant Lord – In the Next Room, or The Vibrator Play; Janet Hine – Hairspray
Best Lighting Design	Best Sound Design
**Nick Schlieper – Love Never Dies**; Howard Harrison – Mary Poppins; Nick Schlieper – Baal (Sydney Theatre Company and Malthouse Melbourne); Adam Silverman – Partenope	**Peter Grubb – Mary Poppins**; Clair Brothers – U2 360º Tour; Stefan Gregory – Baal; Mick Potter – Love Never Dies
