= Terrapin Puppet Theatre =

Terrapin Puppet Theatre is an Australian visual theatre company based in Hobart, known for utilizing puppetry and modern technology.

It was founded by Jennifer Davidson in 1981 following the demise of the Tasmanian Puppet Theatre. Mainly creating productions for children and their families, the company has occasionally created work for adult audiences.

Terrapin frequently tours internationally, including to the United States, New Zealand, Ireland, China, Singapore, Hungary, Denmark, Malaysia and Taiwan.

Its production Boats won the Helpmann Award for Best Presentation for Children at the 2012 Helpmann Awards.
