= Moira Finucane =

Australian actor and burlesque performer

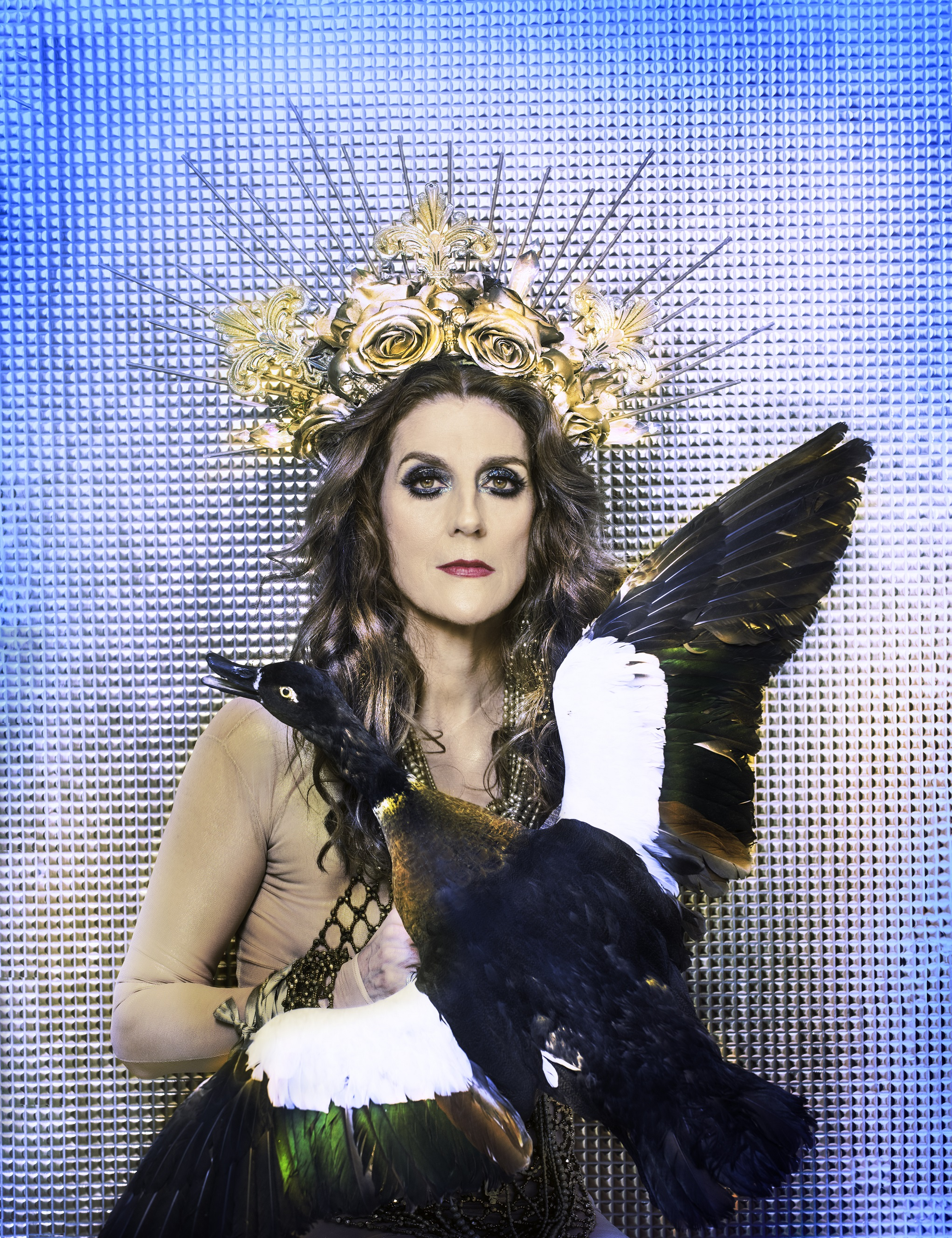
Moira Finucane in 2019

Moira Finucane is an Australian actress and burlesque performer, best known for works including The Burlesque Hour, Carnival of Mysteries and Glory Box.

Finucane was raised in Western Australia. Before acting, she worked as an environmental scientist specialising in wetland rehabilitation and environmental law.

Finucane was nominated in the Best Cabaret Performer category for the 10th Helpmann Awards in 2010 for The Burlesque Hour, the 11th Helpmann Awards in 2011 for Finucane and Smith's Carnival of Mysteries and the 12th Helpmann Awards in 2012 for Burlesque Hour LOVES Melbourne.
