= List of Foo Fighters concert tours =

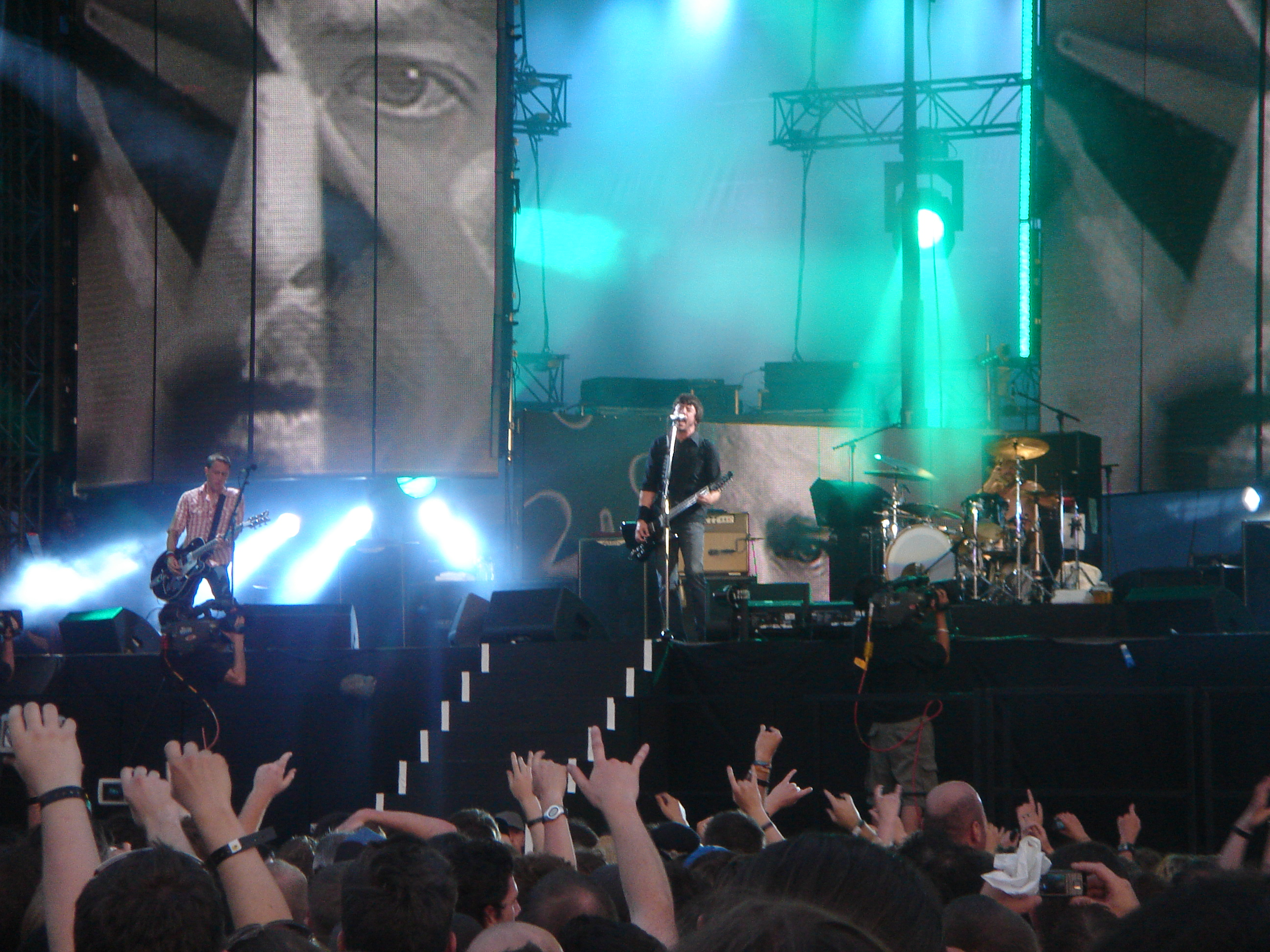
Foo Fighters performing at Hyde Park, London, in 2006.

Foo Fighters is an American alternative rock band, founded in 1994 by musician Dave Grohl. After recording the debut album by himself, Grohl recruited a band to tour with him and promote the album. The original line-up consisted of Nate Mendel, as bassist, and William Goldsmith, as the drummer, of the band Sunny Day Real Estate. Pat Smear, who had toured with Nirvana alongside Grohl, joined the band as a second guitarist.

While recording their second album, Goldsmith left the band and Smear expressed wanting to leave. Taylor Hawkins joined as the drummer and stayed with the band until his death in 2022. Smear did leave in late 1997 and was replaced with Franz Stahl until he parted with the band in 1999. After recording their third album, the band recruited Chris Shiflett as a guitarist. Smear rejoined as a touring guitarist in 2005 and later became an official member again in 2011. Rami Jaffee was also a touring musician with the band and officially became in 2015.

More recently, after Hawkins died in 2022, Josh Freese played the drums from 2023-2024 and Ilan Rubin has played drums for the band since late 2025.

== Foo Fighters tour (1995–96) ==
The first Foo Fighters show took place on February 19 above a boat house in Seattle and was performed for friends and family; the band's first public show took place on February 23 on the Jambalaya Club in Arcata, California; the band was in the area mixing the album and a local promoter asked the cover band The Unseen if Foo Fighters could open for them, which they agreed to; Grohl also played drums with The Unseen on a cover of Slow Down. In the spring of 1995 (starting on April), the Foo Fighters embarked on their first ever United States tour supporting Mike Watt along with fellow tour newbies Hovercraft, whose line-up included Pearl Jam frontman Eddie Vedder at the time. As well as performing with their own bands, Grohl and Vedder each picked up a role as a member of Watt's backing band throughout the tour, supplying drums and guitar respectively. The band's first show outside the United States took place in Vancouver at the Commodore Ballroom on May 12]; they played their first show outside of North America on June 3 in the King's College London; after playing two songs, Grohl discounted the media rumors at the time, telling the audience that none of his songs were about Kurt Cobain. Foo Fighters was released July 4, 1995, on Roswell Records, distributed by Capitol Records. The band promoted the release that summer by completing another US tour with Wool, Skiploader, and Shudder to Think, with 25 concerts in little over a month. During this tour, Foo Fighters played several of their largest shows up to that point, making their debut on the festival circuit with performances at Pukkelpop, Reading and Lowlands. Foo Fighters made their network television debut on The Late Show with David Letterman August 14, 1995, when they performed "This Is a Call".

That fall, the band continued to tour extensively, completing a European tour with Built to Spill. Amid the tour, Foo Fighters filmed the MTV special I'm OK, Eur-OK: Foo Fighters Live in London which featured exclusive footage recorded on November 15, 1995, at the Brixton Academy in London, England, with the majority of the broadcast featuring songs culled from the debut album. Foo Fighters appeared as the musical guest on Saturday Night Live for the first time on December 2, 1995, with host Anthony Edwards, and performed both "I'll Stick Around" and "For All the Cows". The band then closed out the year with their first trips to Japan and Australia.

Foo Fighters continued to tour in support of the album on into 1996, performing at the Summersault Festival that January. The band made an infamous appearance on the March 18, 1996 Rockline radio broadcast, where they performed acoustically. Included in the set was a version of "Wattershed" that contained improvised lyrics by Grohl, delivered in the vocal style of Fred Schneider from The B-52's. That same month Foo Fighters embarked on yet another US tour, this time with a revolving door of supporting acts, including that dog., Ween, Jawbreaker and The Amps. Most shows featuring That Dog on the bill included member Petra Haden joining Foo Fighters on stage during "Floaty" to provide violin. Foo Fighters made an appearance at the first ever Tibetan Freedom Concert on June 15, 1996, a high-profile festival organized by the Beastie Boys to benefit the cause of Tibetan independence, followed by a final tour of Europe that July, to close out support of the album.

== The Colour and the Shape Tour (1997–99) ==
During the recording of The Colour and the Shape, William Goldsmith left and Pat Smear expressed interest in leaving the band. Taylor Hawkins became the new drummer, while Smear remained with the band as a replacement was to be found.

The tour started in May 1997 with dates in Europe and Japan, before going to the United States in June and July. Another overseas tour followed in August before a return to the United States in September. During the September 4, 1997, concert at Radio City Music Hall, right before that year's 1997 MTV Video Music Awards, Smear announced his departure and gave his instrument for the new guitarist, Franz Stahl, to finish the set. Stahl, who played with Grohl in Scream, flew from a tour he was performing in Japan after getting the invitation to join the band.

== There Is Nothing Left to Lose Tour (1999–2001) ==
Despite recording There Is Nothing Left to Lose as a three-piece, Grohl felt the band needed a second guitarist for the tour. After auditioning many players, Chris Shiflett of punk band No Use for a Name was hired. The North American leg of the tour included a support slot on the Red Hot Chili Peppers' Californication Tour. "We went out and opened for the Red Hot Chili Peppers in these arenas, for the first time playing larger venues over a consistent period…" recalled Nate Mendel. "It became obvious: 'Okay, the rules are different now – you have to do things differently to project what you're doing to fill that larger space.' Dave's sharp and motivated and ambitious. It didn't take him long to go, 'Okay, I know what to do here.' He grew into it pretty quickly."

In July 2001, the band interrupted sessions for their fourth studio album to play at British festivals. This was cut short when Hawkins suffered a drug overdose and fell into a coma for two weeks, leading the rest of the concerts of the tour to be canceled. Nonetheless, the band performed a large quantity of shows on this tour, which tired the band and helped influence the sound of their following album.

== One by One Tour (2002–03) ==
Initial sessions for the Foo Fighters' fourth studio album were unproductive, with escalating tensions and the band considering a break-up, but the band members decided to give another chance to the record after their performance at the Coachella Valley Music and Arts Festival in April. One month later, the band rerecorded the album One by One. Following a UK mini-tour in August – which included the T in the Park 2002, Reading and Leeds Festivals – and a Paris concert in September, the album was released on October 22, 2002, with the promotional tour starting that same day at the Los Angeles Wiltern Theatre. Following dates in North America, which included Neil Young's Bridge School Benefit concert on October 26, came a European tour from November 16 to December 19. The Foo Fighters started 2003 with the Big Day Out festival tour in Oceania. From April to July, the band had concerts in North America. V Festival in August.

Five concerts of the tour were turned into the 2003 DVD Everywhere but Home.

Supporting acts

- Cave In, Supergrass

== In Your Honor Tour (2005–06) ==
As the band's fifth studio album, In Your Honor (2005), was a double album featuring a disk of the band's regular rock sound and another with acoustic rock tracks, the related tour included this duality on the concerts, featured two shows per city, an electric one in arenas and an acoustic in smaller venues. The tour began in the summer of 2005, and ran through to June 2006. The late 2005 concerts included the Foozer tour co-headlined with Weezer. The acoustic tour lead to an extended band, featuring the return of Pat Smear on the guitar, plus some of the collaborators on the album: violinist Petra Haden, keyboardist Rami Jaffee, and percussionist Drew Hester. Smear remained for another six years as a touring musician before rejoining as a full-time member for the recording of Wasting Light. An unplugged tour ran in eight cities in the United States between July and August 2006. The acoustic shows from August 29, 30 and 31, 2006 at the Pantages Theater in Los Angeles were turned into the live album Skin and Bones. The June 17 concert in London's Hyde Park was released as both a complementary DVD on Skin and Bones, and a separate release.

== Echoes, Silence, Patience & Grace Tour (2007–08) ==
Echoes, Silence, Patience & Grace Tour
- Tour by Foo Fighters
- Location: Oceania; North America; Europe
- Associated album: Echoes, Silence, Patience & Grace
- Start date: March 27, 2007
- End date: December 3, 2008
- Legs: 9
- No. of shows: 131

The promotional tour for Echoes, Silence, Patience & Grace begun in September 2007, after some concerts in the United Kingdom during the summer, and lasted until Fall 2008. The band performed shows throughout the United States, Canada, Europe, Australia, New Zealand and Asia, including headlining the Virgin Mobile Festival in Baltimore on August 9. At the European MTV Music Awards in 2007 Pat Smear confirmed his return to the band.

While the back-up band compiled for the In Your Honor tour – though with Jessy Greene instead of Petra Haden on the violin – remained to perform complex songs such as "Come Alive", a few tracks had more stripped-down arrangements. The tour lasted 131 concerts in 9 legs spread across Oceania, North America and Europe, from September 2007 to December 2008.

In June 2008, the band performed two sold-out nights on Wembley Stadium in London, which became the DVD Live at Wembley Stadium.

Supporting acts

- Against Me! (2007-2008)
- Supergrass (2008)

== Wasting Light Tour (2011–12) ==
Wasting Light World Tour
- World tour by Foo Fighters
- Start date: May 14, 2011
- End date: September 29, 2012
- Legs: 10
- No. of shows: 51 in North America; 34 in Europe; 10 in Oceania; 4 in South America; 99 in total

On December 21, 2010, the same day the band's seventh album, Wasting Light, was finished, the band played a secret gig at a bar called Paladino's in Tarzana, California, at which four songs from the new record made their live debuts. Other warm-up shows in California followed. Then, a show in London for the NME Awards occurred followed by other promo shows in Europe. Next, the band headed to Australia and New Zealand to play benefit and promo shows. The band then head to North America for the first proper leg of the Wasting Light Tour. with most concerts having the album played in its entirety along with other hit songs by the band. Given the album was recorded in Dave Grohl's garage, the band held a contest for which some shows of the promotional tour would be performed in eight fans' garages. This leg was followed by a run of European Festival and headlining dates, including two sold-out shows at the Milton Keynes National Bowl. Then band then played at the 20th Anniversary of Lollapalooza in Chicago, during which part of their set was played in a rainstorm. The band then played some more European festival dates followed by an extensive North American tour. The band then closed out 2011 with a tour of Australia and New Zealand. The band had a tour of Asia scheduled, but the dates were cancelled due to Dave being ill. Then band then commenced a tour of South America in Spring 2012. Throughout the summer, the band appeared at sporadic North American festivals. The band returned to Europe in August 2012. This tour marked the returns of songs that the band hadn't played in a long time such as "Butterflies", "Winnebago", and "Exhausted".

Supporting acts

- Doughboys – (Leg 4, North America, select dates)
- Rise Against – (Leg 6, North America, select dates)
- Mariachi El Bronx – (Leg 6, North America, select dates)
- Cage the Elephant – (Leg 6, North America, select dates)
- Social Distortion – (Leg 6, North America, select dates)
- The Joy Formidable – (Leg 6, North America, select dates)
- Tenacious D – (Leg 7, Oceania)
- Fucked Up – (Leg 7, Oceania)
- Kvelertak – (Leg 3, Europe)
- Joan Jett and The Blackhearts – (Leg 8, South America)

== Sonic Highways Tour (2014–15) ==
Sonic Highways World Tour
- World tour by Foo Fighters
- Start date: December 10, 2014
- End date: November 13, 2015
- Legs: 6
- No. of shows: 43 in North America; 18 in Europe; 8 in Oceania; 7 in South America; 2 in South Africa; 2 in Asia; 80 in total

The Foo Fighters reunited on February 1, 2014, headlining the "Bud Light Hotel Amphitheatre" built alongside West Side Manhattan for Super Bowl XLVIII. On May 5, the band performed a surprise gig in Washington, D.C.'s 9:30 Club. Thirteen days later, while recording at New Orleans' Preservation Hall for their upcoming album Sonic Highways, the Foo Fighters held another unannounced concert at the venue, with the collaboration of the Preservation Hall Jazz Band. In June, the band headlined Firefly Music Festival in Delaware. In September the Foo Fighters played at the closing of the Invictus Games in London, which was preceded by three intimate gigs in English clubs, and a crowdfunded concert in Richmond, Virginia.

For the premiere of the HBO TV series Foo Fighters: Sonic Highways in October, a private concert was held at the Cubby Bear Bar in Chicago. The promotional tour for the album runs through 2015. In January, the band plays South America in January, Australia and New Zealand in February and March, Ireland and the United Kingdom in May, Europe in June, and North America from July to October. While doing a series of European concerts in November, the November 2015 Paris attacks led the Foo Fighters to cancel 11 remaining gigs due to both respect for the victims and subsequent border closures across the continent. While performing in Sweden on June 12, Dave Grohl fell from the stage during the second song of the set and broke his leg. He was taken off stage for a brief moment before coming back to finish the show as a Swedish doctor held his leg in place. The injury caused the band to cancel their performance at the 2015 Glastonbury Festival which they were to headline that year. The band made a return to the stage on July 4, 2015 at the RFK Stadium in Washington DC to commemorate the 20th anniversary of their debut album. The North American Leg of the tour was retitled to the Broken Leg Tour.

== Concrete and Gold Tour (2017–18) ==
Concrete and Gold Tour
- World tour by Foo Fighters
- Start date: October 14, 2017
- End date: October 18, 2018
- Legs: 8
- No. of shows: 30 in Europe; 5 in Asia; 66 in North America; 6 in Oceania; 6 in South America; 113 in total

Two years after the last tour, the Foo Fighters started another Spring Tour to promote the unnamed and unannounced album Concrete and Gold before its release. The Oceania leg had the band supported by Weezer, who had just put out the album Pacific Daydream. The tour kicked off on October 14 in Richmond, VA. Initially planned to run until September 2018, the tour got the addition of seven more North American concerts in October. Singers Laura Mace, Samantha Sidley, and Bobby Gruska were brought in for the vocal harmonies in "The Sky is a Neighborhood", with Dave Grohl's daughter Violet also joining them on occasion.

== 26th Anniversary/Medicine at Midnight Tour/Live in North America 2022 (2021–22) ==
To celebrate their 25th anniversary, there were plans for a "The Van Tour 2020", performing in the same cities of the Foo Fighters' first North American tour, only in larger venues. However, those wound up cancelled due to the COVID-19 pandemic. The concerts were eventually changed to a 26th Anniversary Tour, starting in July 2021.

In 2021, the band announced a tour promoting Medicine at Midnight that would happen the following year, featuring 17 stadium dates in North America (Live in North America 2022). However, the tour ended up cancelled early during a South America trip, once Taylor Hawkins died in Colombia.

== Australia & New Zealand 2023/24 ==
Australia & New Zealand 23/24
- Antipodean tour by Foo Fighters
- Start date: 29 November 2023
- End date: 27 January 2024
- Legs: 2
- No. of shows: 9

The Foo Fighters toured Australia in late November and December 2023 and continued to New Zealand in mid-January 2024 featuring music from their 2023 album But Here We Are with a total of 9 dates and 8 cities.

== Everything or Nothing at All Tour (2024) ==
Everything or Nothing at All Tour
- Antipodean tour by Foo Fighters
- Start date: 01 May 2024
- End date: 18 August 2024
- Legs: 1
- No. of shows: 19

== Foo Fighters: Live in 2025 ==
Foo Fighters: Live in 2025
- Antipodean tour by Foo Fighters
- Start date: 13 September 2025
- End date: 14 November 2025
- Legs: 3
- No. of shows: 12

== Take Cover Tour (2026) ==
Take Cover Tour
- Antipodean tour by Foo Fighters
- Start date: 10 January 2026
- End date: 26 September 2026
- Legs: 4
- No. of shows: 30
