= Angela's Kitchen =

Play written by Paul Capsis

- Author: Paul Capsis, Hilary Bell and Julian Meyrick
- Language: English
- Genre: Play
- Publisher: Currency Press
- Publication place: Australia
- Media type: Print (Paperback)
- ISBN: 978-0-86819-946-7

Angela's Kitchen is an Australian play by Paul Capsis, Hilary Bell and Julian Meyrick. It won the Best New Australian Work at the 12th Helpmann Awards.

== First production ==
Angela’s Kitchen was first produced by the Griffin Theatre Company at The Stables Theatre, Sydney, on 5 November 2010, with the following participants:

Performer, Paul Capsis

Director, Julian Meyrick

Associate Writer, Hilary Bell

Designer, Louise McCarthy

Lighting Designer, Verity Hampson

Music, Sound and AV Designer, Steve Toulmin
