= T in the Park 2002 =

Music festival in Scotland

T in the Park
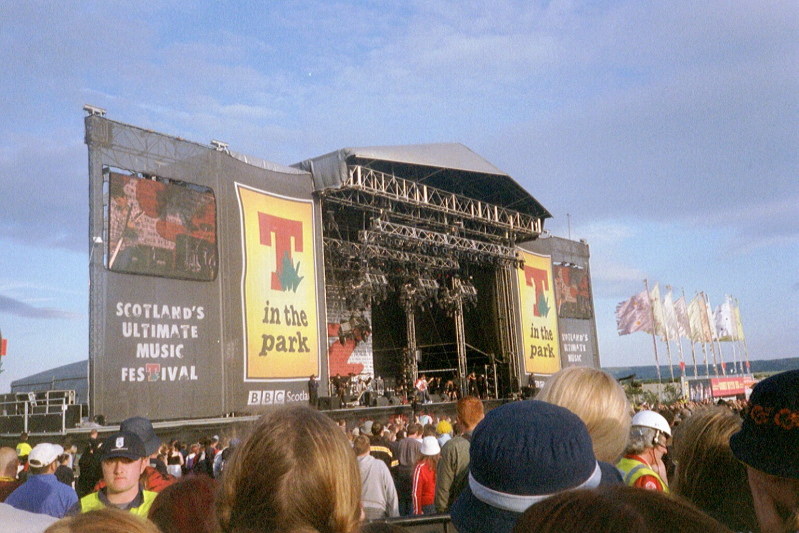
- Dates: 13–14 July 2002
- Locations: Balado, Scotland
- Years active: 1994 - present
- Website: https://tinthepark.com/

T in the Park 2002 was held on 13–14 July 2002.

== Line up ==
The 2002 line-up was as follows:

=== Main Stage ===
Saturday 13 July	Sunday 14 July
Oasis; Primal Scream; Gomez; No Doubt; Starsailor; The Dandy Warhols; The Polyphonic Spree; Proud Mary; DJ Arthur Baker	The Chemical Brothers; Foo Fighters; Green Day; The Hives; Jimmy Eat World; Mull Historical Society; Beverley Knight; DJ Arthur Baker

=== BBC Radio 1/NME Stage ===
Saturday 13 July	Sunday 14 July
Basement Jaxx; Morcheeba; Idlewild; A; Less than Jake; The Cooper Temple Clause; Rival Schools; Hoobastank; Halo	Air; Doves; The Beta Band; SWR (Shaun Ryder); Hundred Reasons; Spunge; Seafood; The Parkinsons

=== King Tuts Wah Wah Tent ===
Saturday 13 July	Sunday 14 July
Badly Drawn Boy; Black Rebel Motorcycle Club; Tricky; Joe Strummer & The Mescaleros; Haven; The Music; The Coral; Athlete; Leaves; Ashton Lane	Ian Brown; Mercury Rev; Sonic Youth; The Electric Soft Parade; The Shining; Cornelius; Delta; Kid Galahad

=== Slam Tent ===
Saturday 13 July	Sunday 14 July
Groove Armada; Slam (Orde Meikle & Stuart McMillan); The Youngsters; Harry 'Choo Choo' Romero; Tom Middleton's Cosmos; Dot Allison; DJ Q; Harri & Domenic	Orbital; Richie Hawtin; Marco & Gaetano; Green Velvet; Layo & Bushwacka!; Percy X; FC Kahuna; Master H; Cinephile

=== T Break Tent ===
Saturday 13 July	Sunday 14 July
Cholo; Major Major; Kain; 1" Volcano; The Day I Snapped; Policechief; The Grim Northern Social; Degrassi; Nerve; Julia Thirteen; MC Sleazy	X-Tigers; Jetstar; Workshy; Cannon; Snodgrass; Odeon Beat Club; Tippi; Monica Queen; Eska; Vera Cruise; August 81; Bendy Toy
