= Melissa Madden Gray =

Australian cabaret artist

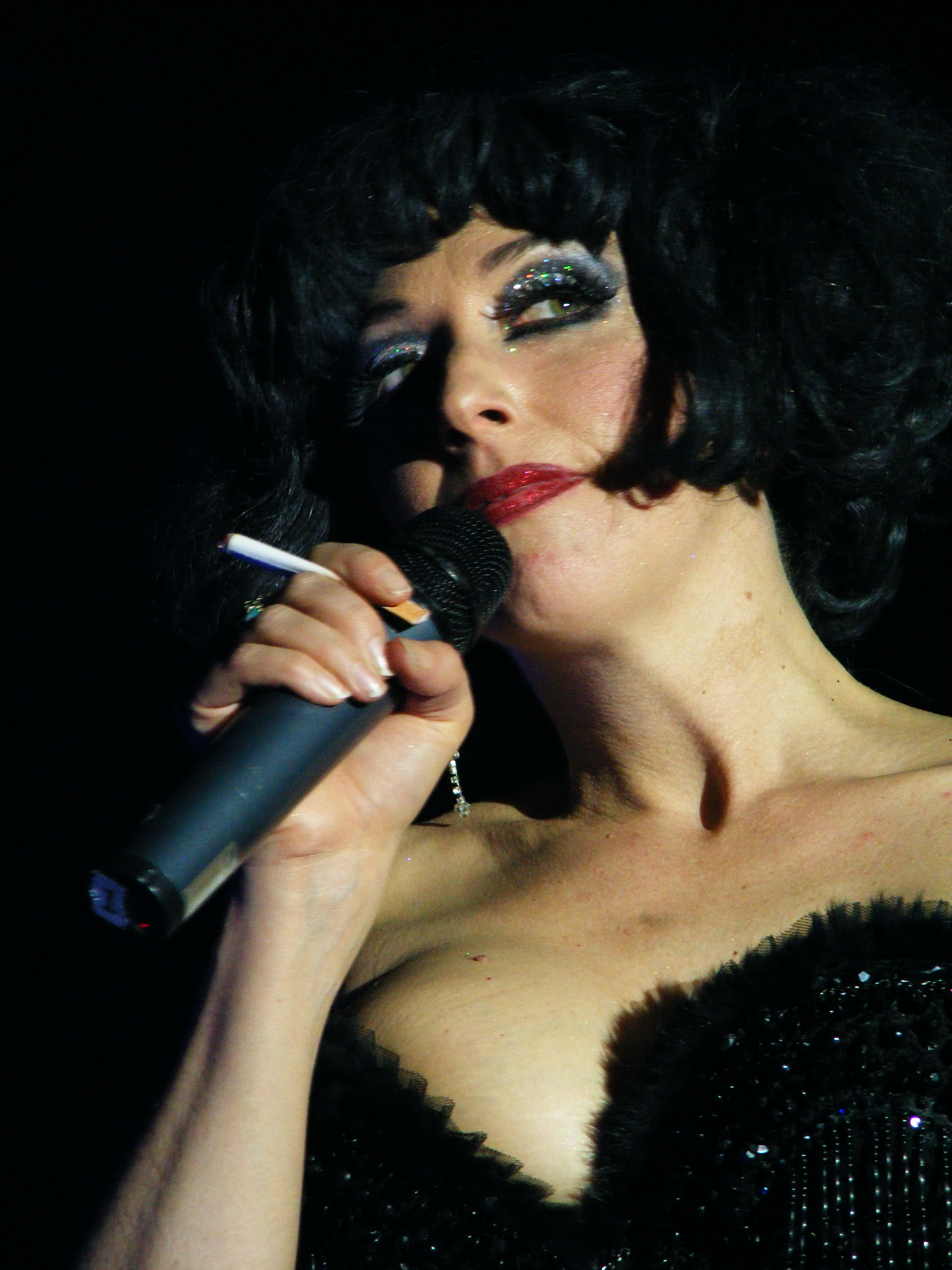
- Meow Meow

Background information
- Born: Australia
- Genres: Cabaret, kabarett
- Occupations: Singer; actor

Melissa Madden Gray, stage name Meow Meow, is an Australian-born actress, dancer and cabaret performer who tours internationally. Gray has been particularly active in the UK where she appeared in La Clique at the Roundhouse and created the role of the Maîtresse in the West End musical adaptation of The Umbrellas of Cherbourg at the Gielgud Theatre. In 2010 Meow Meow was awarded the Edinburgh Festival Fringe Prize. In January 2011 she premiered "Meow Meow in Concert" for three nights at the Apollo Theatre on London's West End. She was named Best Cabaret Performer at the 2012 Helpmann Awards for her show, Little Match Girl. She debuted "An Audience with Meow Meow" at the Berkeley Repertory Theatre in California as part of their Fall 2014 season.

== Training ==
As an undergraduate, Gray studied at the University of Melbourne where she was a resident student at Trinity College. She took the degrees of Bachelor Laws and Bachelor of Arts in Fine Arts and German (with honours).

Gray is also a graduate of the Western Australian Academy of Performing Arts, and has been a soloist with the Young Dancers Theatre (Victoria).

== Style ==
Gray performs a style of cabaret that has been called "kamikaze cabaret". She may stagger onto the stage, appear later than scheduled, experience wardrobe malfunctions, shout unexpected things, and interact with audience members. However, "... this is a polished presentation of the spectacle of failure – a ruse that underlines the necessary collaboration between performer and audience, and creates a shabby frame within which Meow Meow's exquisite voice can shine all the brighter", as written in a 2018 Guardian article.

== Theatre ==
Year	Show	Role	Notes
2001	Dennis Cleveland		Opera, Octagon Theatre, Perth Festival
2008	Vamp	Herself	Malthouse Theatre Sydney Opera House
2008	Insert the Person You Love	Herself	Pilgrim Theatre (Sydney Festival)
2009	La Clique	Herself	Roundhouse
2010	Meow Meow	Herself	Cabaret show, Edinburgh Festival Fringe
2011	Meow Meow in Concert	Herself	Cabaret show, Apollo Theatre, London (3 nights)
2011–12	Meow Meow's Little Match Girl	Herself	Commissioned by Malthouse Theatre (2011) Spiegeltent (Sydney Festival 2012) Southbank Centre (2012)
2011	The Umbrellas of Cherbourg	Maîtresse	Dir: Emma Rice at the Gielgud Theatre
2014–15	An Audience with Meow Meow	Herself	Berkeley Repertory Theatre, California (2014) Cutler Majestic Theatre, Boston (ArtsEmerson, 2015)
2016–17	Souvenir	Herself	Theatre Royal, Hobart (Festival of Voices 2016) Theatre Royal, Brighton (Brighton Festival 2017) Her Majesty's Theatre, Adelaide (2017)
2016	A Midsummer Night's Dream	Hippolyta / Titania	Dir: Emma Rice
2016	Meow Meow's Little Mermaid	Herself	Malthouse Theatre
2017	The Black Rider: The Casting of the Magic Bullets		Malthouse Theatre (in conjunction with Victorian Opera)
2014–19	Apocalypse Meow: Crisis is Born	Herself	Commissioned by Southbank Centre (2014) Sam Wanamaker Playhouse (2017) Malthouse Theatre (2019) Brooklyn Academy of Music (BAM Next Wave Festival 2019) [Presented as BAM: A Very Meow Meow Holiday Show]
2015–21	Meow Meow's Pandemonium	Herself	With Oregon Symphony at Arlene Schnitzer Concert Hall (Time-Based Art Festival 2015) With London Philharmonic Orchestra at Royal Festival Hall (2016–17) With Bergen Philharmonic Orchestra at Grieg Hall (Berlin Festival 2018) With Sydney Symphony Orchestra at Sydney Opera House (Sydney Festival 2018) With Seattle Symphony at Benaroya Hall (2019) With Melbourne Symphony Orchestra at Hamer Hall, Melbourne (2021)
2025	Meow Meow's The Red Shoes	Herself	Malthouse Theatre
2026	Sweeney Todd: The Demon Barber of Fleet Street	Mrs Lovett	Birmingham Repertory Theatre

== Filmography ==
=== Film ===
Year	Show	Role	Notes
2019	Cats	Griddlebone	Feature film
2012	Little Match Girl		TV fim
2003	The Honourable Wally Norman	Rebecca-Jane Thompson	Feature film
2000	Risk	Colleen	Feature film

=== Television ===
Year	Show	Role	Notes
1998	Murder Call	Rowena Brewster	TV series, S2E19: Bone Dead
2015	The Divorce	Ellen	TV miniseries, 4 episodes
2010	Lowdown	Receptionist	TV series, 1 episode
2003-04	Big Bite	Various characters	TV series, 15 episodes

== Reviews ==
- Barry Humphries' Weimar Cabaret, Cadogan Hall, London, reviewed by Tim Ashley The Guardian July–August 2016
- Apocalypse Meow, Southbank Centre, London, reviewed by Claudio Giambrone, South Bank London December 2014
- The Umbrellas of Cherbourg, Gielgud Theatre, London, reviewed by Paul Taylor, The Independent, 24 March 2011
- The Umbrellas of Cherbourg, Gielgud Theatre, London, reviewed by Michael Billington, The Guardian, 23 March 2011
- Soho Theatre, London, reviewed by Brian Logan, The Guardian, 29 March 2010
