= Melbourne Cabaret Festival =

The Melbourne Cabaret Festival is a not-for-profit cabaret festival that has been held each year since 2010 in the city of Melbourne in Australia and that by 2013 had grown to become the world's second-largest event of its kind.

The festival was launched in 2010 by the former Melbourne nightclub owners Neville Sice and David Read and has been run each year since then by them. It was the first Australian festival to use "crowdfunding" as its main source of seed money.

The American singer Mary Wilson of The Supremes was the headliner artist in 2013 when the festival was reported to have attracted total audiences of more than 15,200.

The fifth annual Melbourne Cabaret Festival took place between 19 June and 6 July 2014 at various nightclub venues across the city and was reported to have featured more than 100 performers in 30 separate shows by cabaret and burlesque artists from Australia and the United Kingdom.
