= Yonghoon Lee =

South Korean opera singer (born 1973)

- 이용훈
- Born: 22 November 1973 (age 53); South Korea
- Citizenship: Korean
- Education: Seoul National University; The New School
- Occupation: Opera singer (tenor)

Korean name
- Hangul: 이용훈
- Hanja: 李勇勳
- RR: I Yonghun
- MR: I Yonghun

Yonghoon Lee (born 22 November 1973) is a South Korean operatic tenor. He has performed at many of the most prestigious theaters in the world, including the Royal Opera House, Covent Garden, Metropolitan Opera, Deutsche Oper Berlin, Vienna State Opera, Rome Opera, Dutch National Opera in Amsterdam, Bavarian State Opera in Munich, Teatro alla Scala in Milan, Semperoper Dresden, Lyric Opera of Chicago, San Francisco Opera, Opera Australia, amongst others.

== Biography ==
Lee studied music at Seoul National University and the Mannes School of Music. He made his international debut in the title role of Don Carlo at the Teatro Municipal in Santiago, Chile. He made his debut at the Metropolitan Opera in November 2010 in the same role.

== Opera roles ==
Role	Composer	Opera
Alfredo	Verdi	La Traviata
Arrigo	Verdi	La Battaglia di Legnano
Calaf	Puccini	Turandot
Cavaradossi	Puccini	Tosca
Don Alvaro	Verdi	La Forza del Destino
Don Carlo	Verdi	Don Carlo
Don José	Bizet	Carmen
Hagenbach	Catalani	La Wally
Luigi	Puccini	Il tabarro
Manrico	Verdi	Il trovatore
Pollione	Bellini	Norma
Radamès	Verdi	Aida
Rodolfo	Puccini	La Bohème
Ruggero	Puccini	La Rondine
Turiddu	Mascagni	Cavalleria rusticana
Canio	Leoncavallo	Pagliacci
