= Madeline Lee (opera) =

2004 opera by John Haddock and Michael Campbell

Madeline Lee is a one act Australian opera, composed by John Haddock to a libretto written by the composer and Michael Campbell. It premiered at the Sydney Opera House on 8 October 2004 in an Opera Australia production directed by Michael Campbell and conducted by Tom Woods.

== Plot ==
The story of the opera is based on the disappearance of the B-24 bomber Lady Be Good in 1943 over Libya in North Africa. Taking elements of the story as portrayed in the television movie Sole Survivor, it enlarges on the themes of dislocation, memory, isolation and identity, and concentrates on the internal relationship between the dead crew and the Major, who heads the search and rescue party sent to survey the wreck. The revelation of their intertwined fate culminates in a dramatic re-enactment of the Madeline Lee’s final bombing mission over the Mediterranean and the recovery by the Major of his suppressed memories of the event.

== History ==
The piece was first drafted in 1990, but gained creative impetus after the composer survived the Port Arthur massacre in 1996 along with six other colleagues from Opera Australia. In partnership with the director and dramaturg Michael Campbell, the script was re-written, focussing on how traumatic events alter the way humans remember things, especially the feeling of dislocation of time and the loss of identity.

The creators then workshopped the score in the Centre for Performance Studies at the University of Sydney by means of a grant from the Australia Council for the Arts and private sponsorship in 1999, and two years later scene four of the completed score was given a concert performance in the Sydney Opera House in September 2001, conducted by the Australian composer Richard Mills. In an odd twist of fate, this scene (in which the bomber crashes), was given its first orchestral rehearsal on the morning of 9/11. After further work on the score, the opera was scheduled for its world premiere in October 2004. See below for information concerning original cast, production and reception.

In October 2019, the State Opera of South Australia performed Madeline Lee in their series of Lost Australian Operas at the rehearsal space of the State Opera of South Australia in Netley, Adelaide. The opera was performed twice, with a two-piano accompaniment. It was directed by Douglas McNicol, (the Lieutenant in the original production), and was conducted by Warwick Stengårds. It starred Warwick Fyfe as the Major, and featured Robert Macfarlane, Nicholas Cannon, Eddie Muliaumaseali'i and Pelham Andrews. The cast also included Thomas Millhouse, Joshua Rowe and Robert England.

== Cast ==
The premiere was staged by Opera Australia as part of its 2004 Sydney Winter season. The cast was as follows:

Roles, voice types, premiere cast
Role	Voice type	Premiere cast, 8 October 2004 Conductor: Tom Woods
The Boy	tenor	Christopher Lincoln
The Major	dramatic baritone	Michael Lewis
Lieutenant	baritone	Douglas McNicol
Pat	bass-baritone	Nicolas Todorovic
Ben	bass	Judd Arthur
1st Officer	baritone	José Carbó
2nd Officer	baritone	James Payne
3rd Officer	bass	Richard Anderson
Director	Michael Campbell	Michael Campbell
Designer	Brian Thomson	Brian Thomson
Lighting	Stephen Wickham	Stephen Wickham
Assistant Director	Matthew Barclay	Matthew Barclay
Stage Manager	Crissie Higgins	Crissie Higgins
Orchestra	Australian Opera and Ballet Orchestra	Australian Opera and Ballet Orchestra
Production	Opera Australia	Opera Australia

== Reception ==
The opera received widespread critical acclaim. Critics called it "a forceful account of an encounter between a person and his memories... a strange, strong statement, built on sound operatic understanding by a promising new operatic talent." Others described it as "a compelling and haunting work about the power of memory and how it affects our lives. Haddock and Campbell's lyrical and elegiac libretto is so good that, at times, it rises to the level of poetry. Madeline Lee is an important achievement in Australian Opera..." and... "Madeline Lee is one of those rare operas where music, drama and emotion synthesize into moments that feel incredibly immediate and real...a truly riveting piece." The audience reception was also noteworthy. "It was a rare enough occasion that Opera Australia presented the world premier of an Australian opera, and an even rarer instance that the audience leapt to their feet at the end and gave both the composer and the co-librettist/director a standing ovation....Easily the best thing we have seen at the opera all year."

The final performance was recorded by ABC Classic FM and broadcast nationwide on 12 December 2004 and again in 2005.

Madeline Lee was subsequently nominated for seven Helpmann Awards in July 2005. The nominations were José Carbó (Best Male Performer in a Supporting Role in an Opera), Christopher Lincoln (Best Male Performer in a Supporting Role in an Opera), John Haddock (Best Original Score), Tom Woods (Best Music Direction), Michael Lewis (Best Male Performer in an Opera), John Haddock and Michael Campbell (Best New Australian Work), and lastly Madeline Lee was nominated as Best Opera.

In October 2006 Opera Australia celebrated its 50th birthday with a gala concert in the Sydney Opera House, performing scenes, arias and ensembles from some of the company's extensive repertoire in concert form. Modern Australian operatic composition was represented on that occasion by a performance of scene two from Madeline Lee, sung by Michael Lewis and conducted by Richard Hickox. The concert was recorded live by ABC for broadcast the following year.

== Photo gallery ==
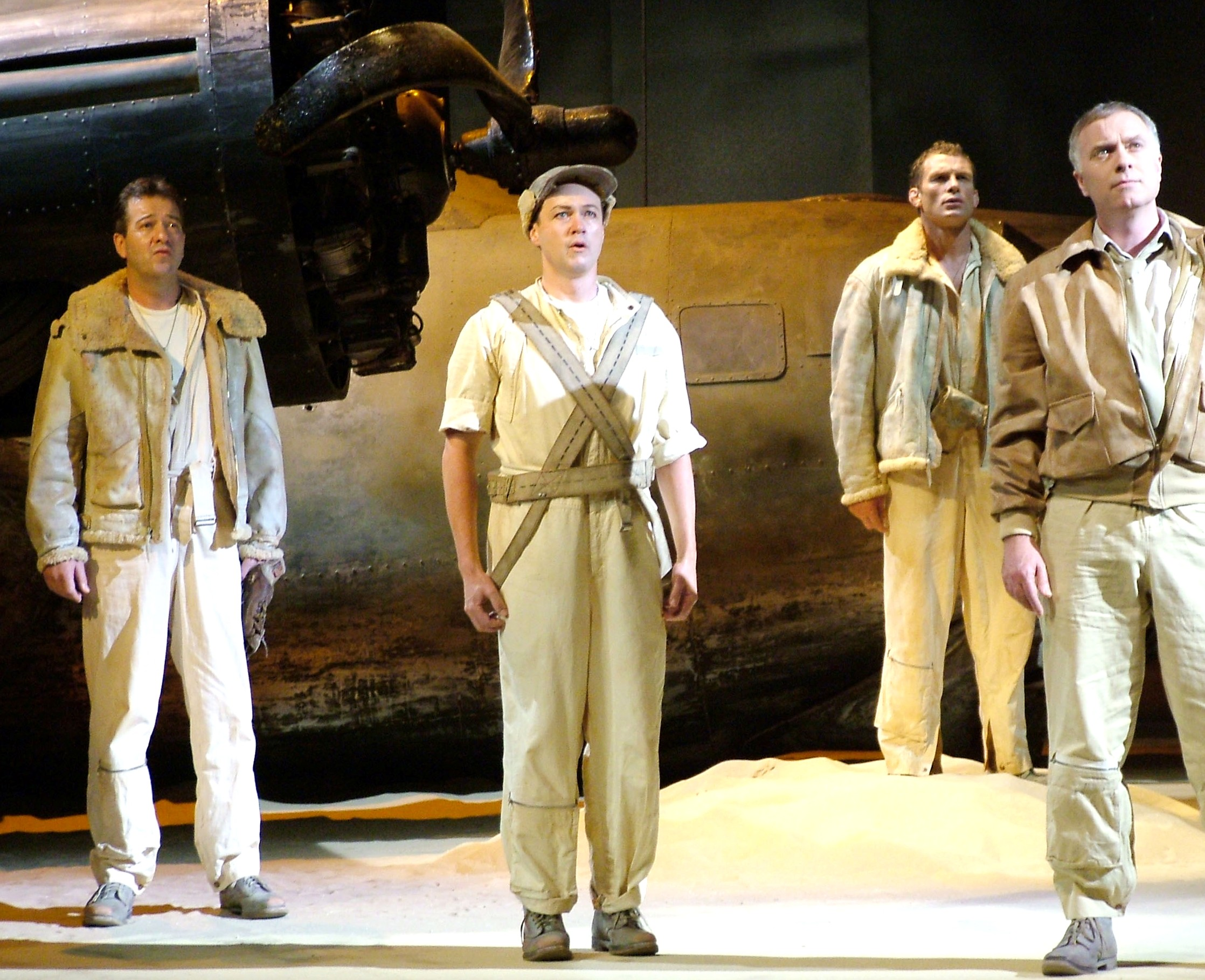
The crew wait to be rescued.

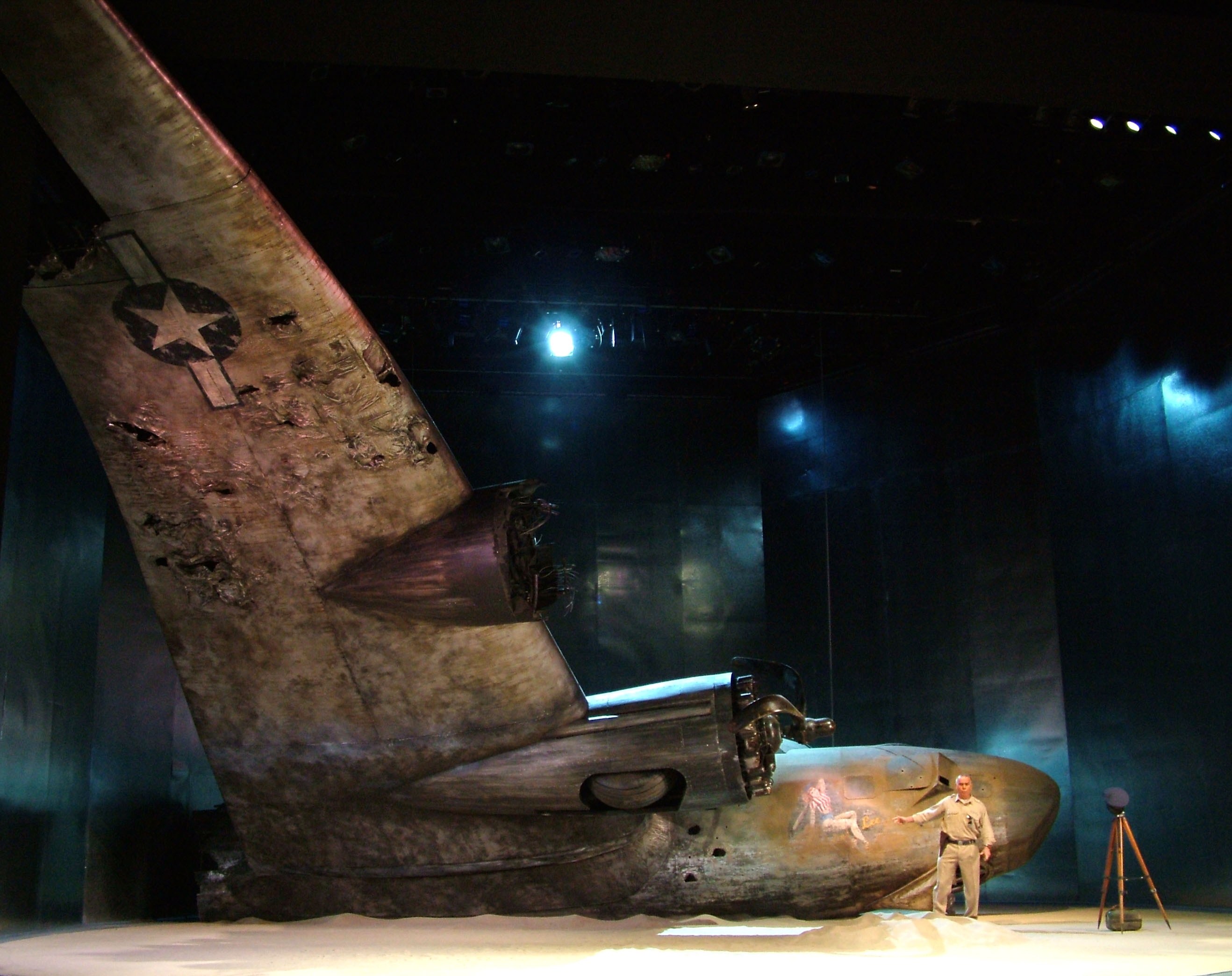
The Major recognises the bomber.

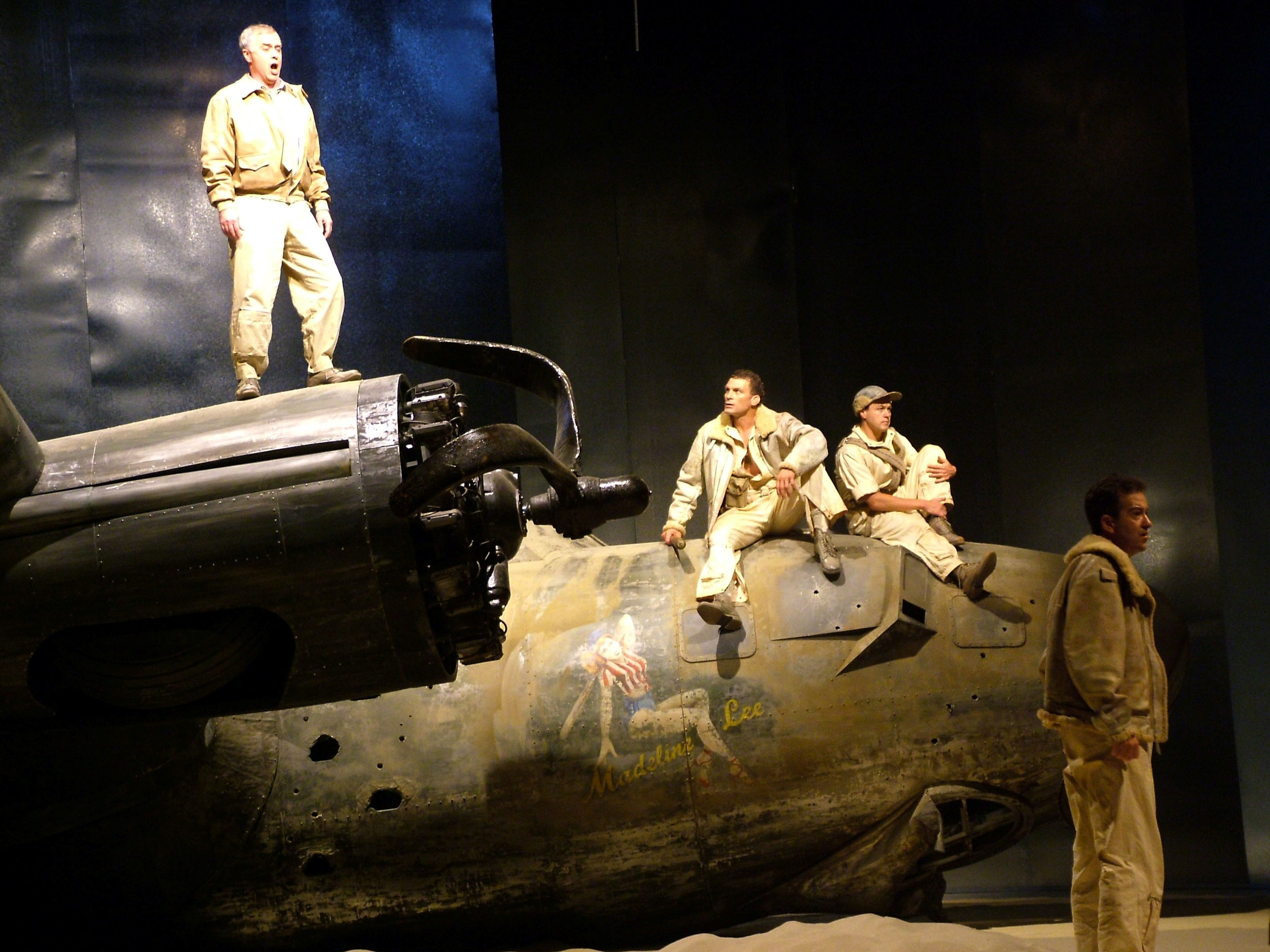
The crew recognise the Major.

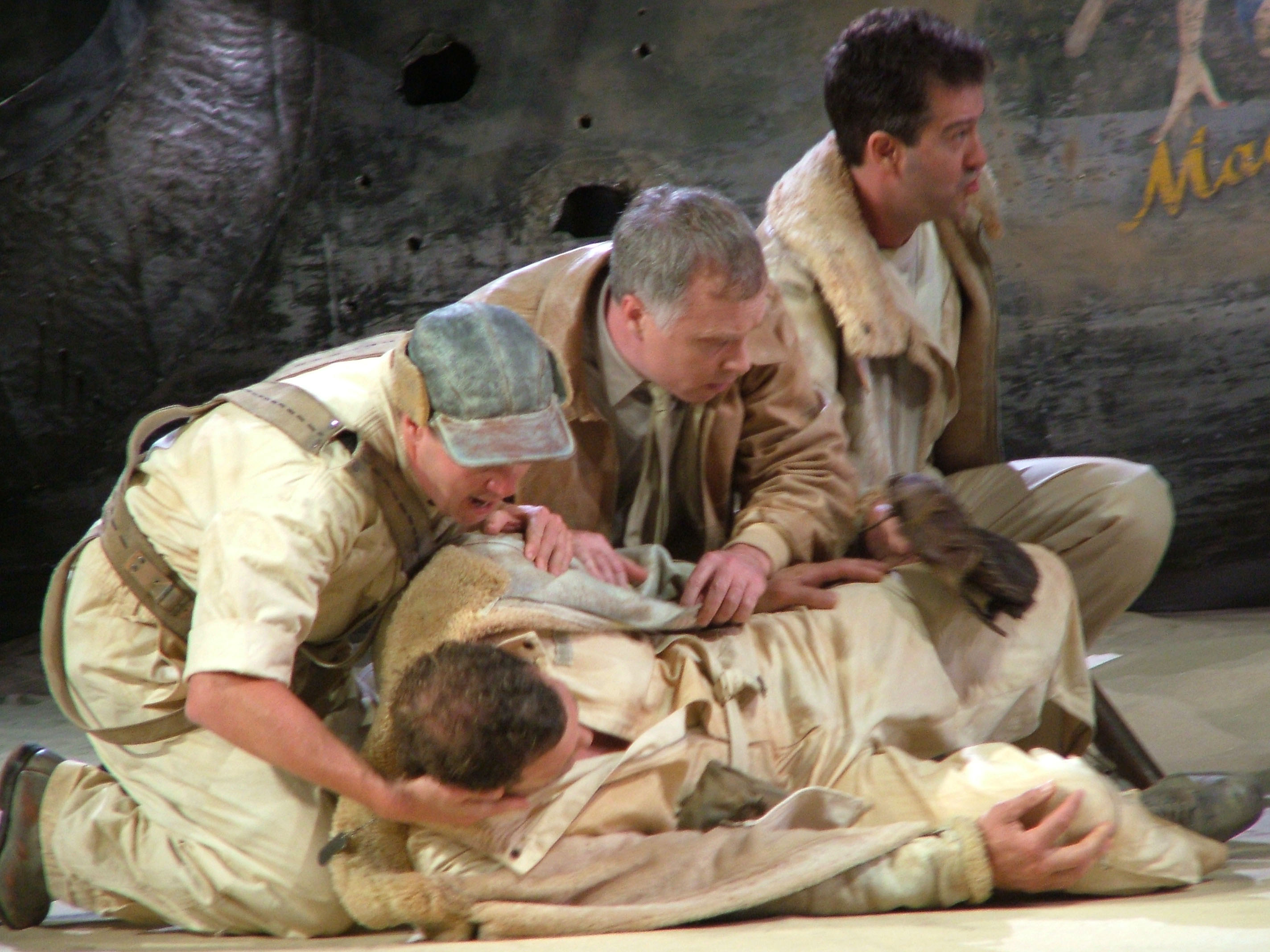
Argument

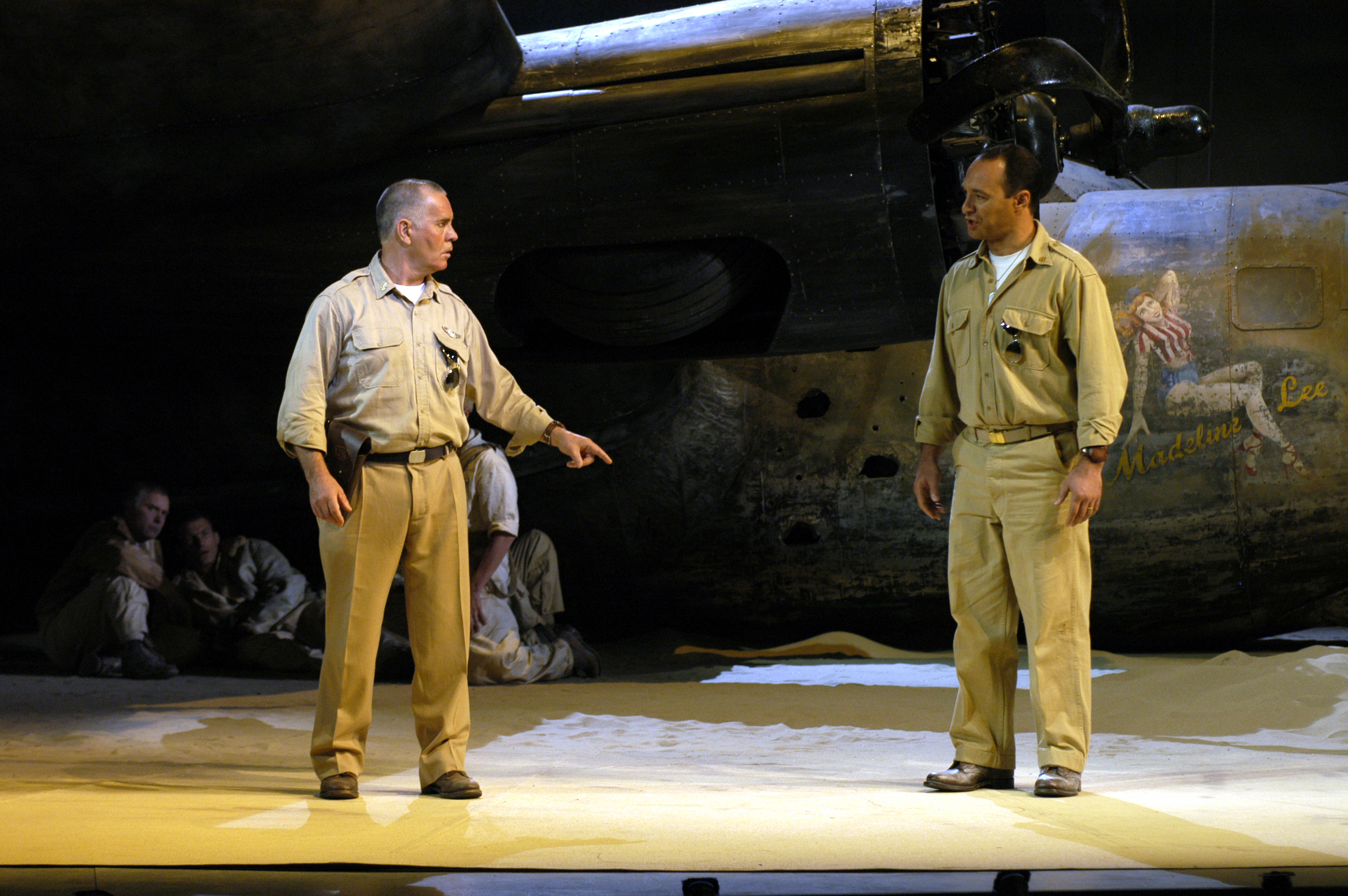
The 1st Officer questions the Major.

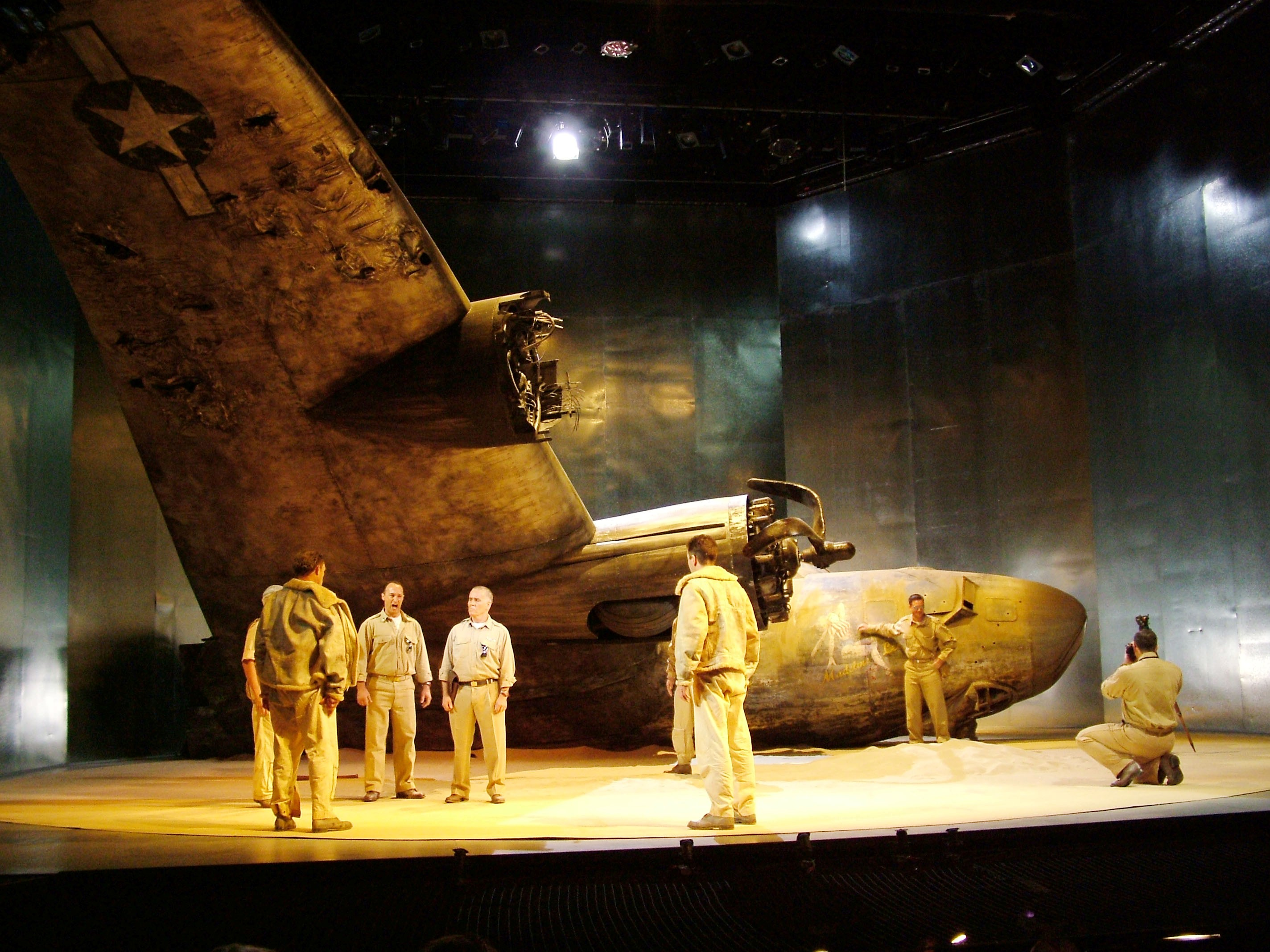
Ensemble

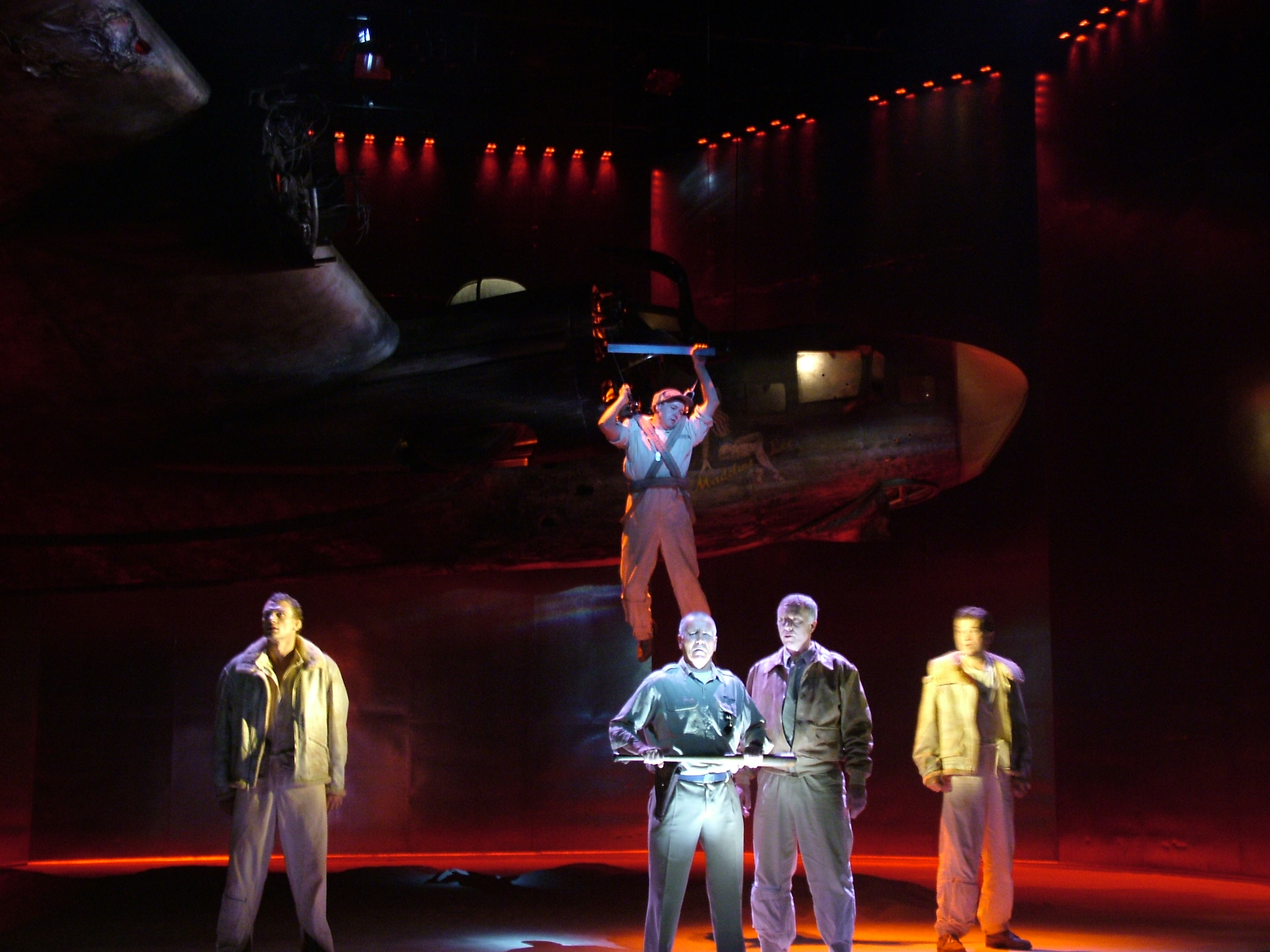
Reliving the mission

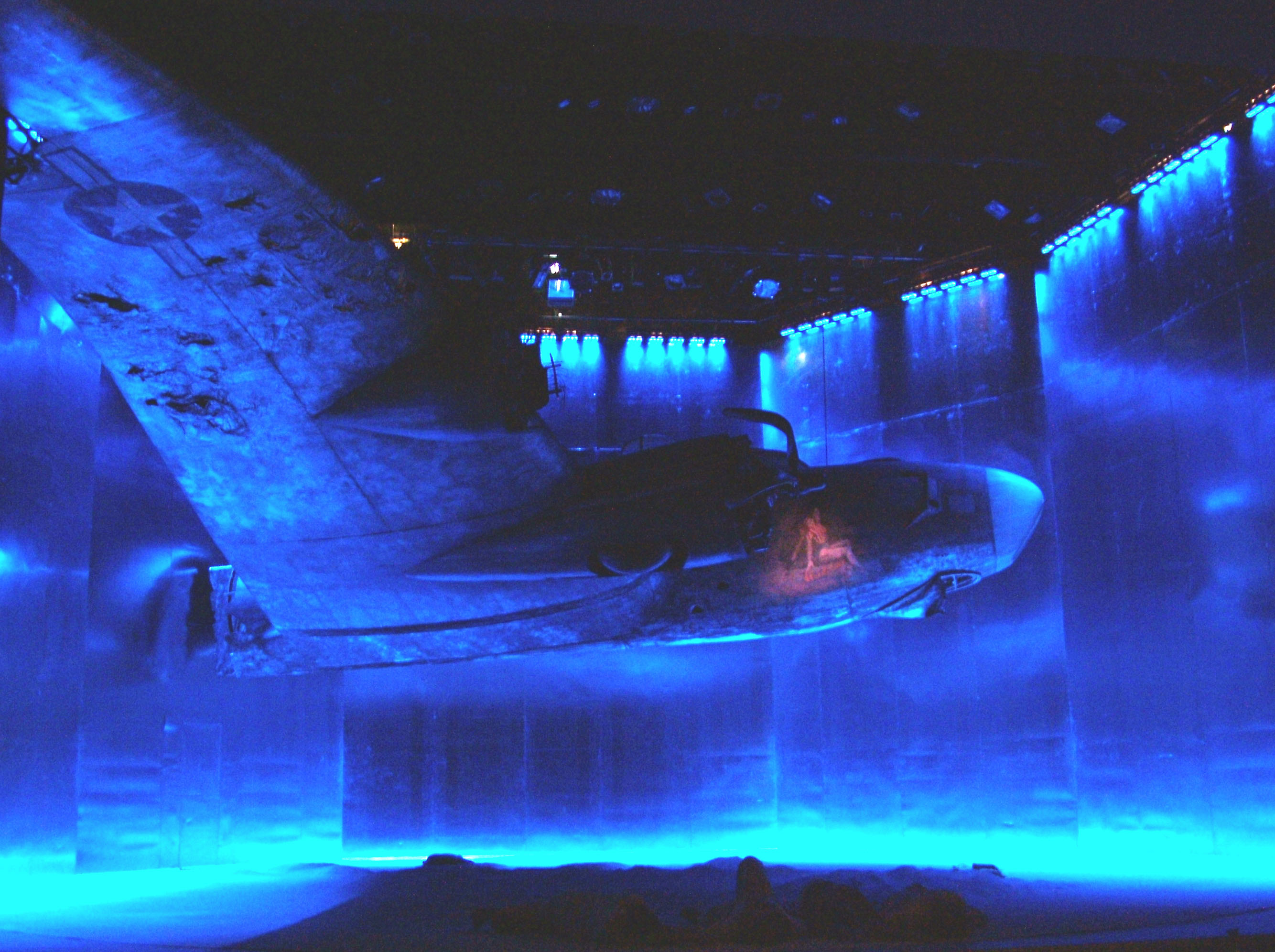
The final resolution
