= Riccardo Massi =

Italian operatic tenor

Riccardo Massi is an Italian operatic tenor who has performed at the prestigious Italian theaters Giuseppe Verdi Theatre and La Scala. He became known for his role as Mario Cavaradossi in Tosca, which he performed in autumn of 2011 at the Bavarian State Opera and performed again at the Berlin Opera Theatre in November of that year. His United States debut was in February 2012 as Radames in Aida at the Metropolitan Opera following by another summer performance that year. In the autumn of 2012, he sang in Il trovatore staged by the Canadian Opera in Toronto and in February 2013 sang Calaf in Turandot produced by the Royal Swedish Opera. He also became known for his performance as Don Alvaro in La forza del destino at the Australian Opera and the same year sang in another Aida production, this time at the Michigan Opera Theatre. From 2013 to 2014 he performed at the Royal Opera House and as Cavaradossi at the Liceu in Barcelona. Later on, he returned to Royal Swedish Opera where he sang the title role in Andrea Chenier and then Radames at the Houston Grand Opera. At the Opernhaus Zurich, he sang Calaf in December 2015. He sang Calaf again at the Teatro Degollado in Guadalajara, Mexico in November/December 2018.
