= Paul Capsis =

Australian singer and actor

- Born: 1963 or 1964 (age 62–63); Sydney, New South Wales, Australia
- Occupations: Actor; singer; playwright
- Years active: 1988–present
- Notable work: Angela's Kitchen

Paul Capsis (born 1964) is an Australian actor, singer and playwright who mainly works in cabaret and musical theatre. He has also released four albums, Paul Capsis Live (2004), Boulevard Delirium, Everybody Wants to Touch Me (2008) and Make Me a King (2010). His film work includes roles in Head On (1998) and The Boy Castaways (2013). Capsis appeared in the telemovie Carlotta (2014). At the Helpmann Awards he has won five accolades: Best Live Music Presentation for Capsis vs Capsis (2002), Best Performance in an Australian Contemporary Concert for Boulevard Delirium (2006), Best Male Actor in a Supporting Role in a Play for Diana in The Lost Echo (2007), Best Male Actor in a Play and Best New Australian Work for Angela's Kitchen (2012).

== Biography ==
Paul Capsis was born in 1963 or 1964 as the second child of father Chris (Greek heritage) and mother Mary (Maltese). During childhood his parents were divorced and Capsis was partly raised in Surry Hills by his maternal grandmother Angela in a "conservative, religious environment".

In the Belvoir Street Theatre adaptation of the Indonesian-based The Cockroach Opera (1992) Capsis took the role of Kumis, a street gang leader. Helen Musa of The Canberra Times praised Capsis' singing as "especially notable". In his solo show, Burning Sequins, at Budinski's, Carlton in 1995 he variously impersonated Shirley Bassey, Bette Midler, Madonna, Tina Turner, Diana Ross, Judy Garland, Barbra Streisand and Janis Joplin. Capsis appeared in an Australian production of The Caucasian Chalk Circle, written by Bertolt Brecht, which was performed at the Belvoir in September 1998. His role was described by The Australian Jewish News' Peter Morrison as "an androgynous, dual-voiced Arkadi".

Capsis' film work includes roles in Head On (1998) opposite Alex Dimitriades, where he took the supporting role of Johnny/Toula. Angela's Kitchen is an autobiographical one-man play with Capsis portraying multiple roles from his childhood. It was first performed at Stables Theatre, Darlinghurst in November 2010. During 2012 Angela's Kitchen had four runs: Beckett Theatre, Melbourne (May–June, September), Lennox Theatre, Parramatta (August) and Visy Theatre, New Farm, Queensland. Rebecca Harkins-Cross of The Sydney Morning Herald reviewed the Beckett Theatre performance, "Like memory itself, there is no overarching narrative here but short vignettes that move across time and continents. The familial story speaks to a wider history of Australia as a migrant nation." At the 12th Helpmann Awards in 2012 he won both Best Male Actor in a Play and Best New Australian Work. He appeared in Michael Kantor's film The Boy Castaways (2013), starring Megan Washington and Tim Rogers. He provided a supporting role as Stefan in the 2014 telemovie Carlotta, screened on ABC TV.

== Discography ==
- Paul Capsis Live at Angel Place City Recital Hall (2004) – Black Yak Records (BYOA-33)
- Everybody Wants to Touch Me (2008) – Black Yak Records (BYOA-36)
- Make Me a King (2010) – ABC Records (2744643

== Theatre roles ==
Credits:

- Grace Among the Christians (1988)
- St Rose of Lima (1990, 1992)
- Fun and Games with Oresteia (1991)
- Shadow Me, Shadow You (1991)
- The Lady Is a Camp (1992) – also devised by Capsis
- The Cockroach Opera (1992) – Kumis
- Paul Capsis and His Pack of Divas (1993)
- The Wedding Song (1994)
- The Emerald Room (1994)
- Burning Sequins (1995–1996) – also devised by Capsis
- Playgrounds (1996)
- Paul Capsis in Cabaret (1997)
- The Burlesque (1998) – co-created and co-written by Capsis
- The Caucasian Chalk Circle (1998)
- The Resistible Rise of Arturo Ui (1999)
- Paul Capsis (1999)
- Can We Afford This / The Cost of Living (2000)
- Sweet 'n' Hot (2001)
- Paul Capsis in Concert (2001)
- aLive (2001)
- Spoofed Up (2001)
- Capsis v Capsis (2002)
- Volpone (2002)
- Capsis (2003)
- Thyestes (2004)
- Boulevard Delirium (2005)
- Paul Capsis Under a Sawtooth Roof (2005)
- Three Furies: Scenes from the Life of Francis Bacon (2006)
- The Lost Echo Part One (2006)
- The Lost Echo Part Two (2006)
- Paul Capsis (2007)
- Tales from The Vienna Woods (2007)
- The Rocky Horror Show (2008) – Riff Raff
- A Company of Strangers (2009)
- The Threepenny Opera (2010)
- All About My Mother (2010)
- Angela's Kitchen (2010, 2012, 2017) – also co-written by Capsis
- Die Winterreise (2011)
- Pinocchio (2014–2015)
- Little Bird (2014)
- Calpurnia Descending (2014)
- The Wizard of Oz (2015)
- The Popular Mechanicals (2015)
- Resident Alien (2016)
- Rumpelstiltskin (2016)
- Cabaret (2017)
- The Black Rider: The Casting of the Magic Bullets (2017)
- Good Omens (2017)

== Awards and nominations ==
- 1998 AFI Best Actor in a Supporting Role nomination for Head On
- 1998 Film Critics Circle Awards – Best Supporting Actor for feature film Head On
- 2002 Helpmann Award for Best Live Music Presentation for Capsis vs Capsis'
- 2004 Green Room Award – Best Cabaret Artiste
- 2006 Green Room Award – Best Cabaret Artiste for Boulevard Delirium
- 2006 Helpmann Award for Best Performance in an Australian Contemporary Concert for Boulevard Delirium
- 2007 Helpmann Award for Best Male Actor in a Supporting Role in a Play for The Lost Echo
- 2012 Helpmann Award for Best New Australian Work for Angela's Kitchen (with Julian Meyrick and Hilary Bell)
- 2012 Helpmann Award for Best Male Actor in a Play for Angela's Kitchen
- 2013 ACON - Media, Arts and Entertainment Honour Award
