= Die Roten Punkte =

Australian musical comedy duo

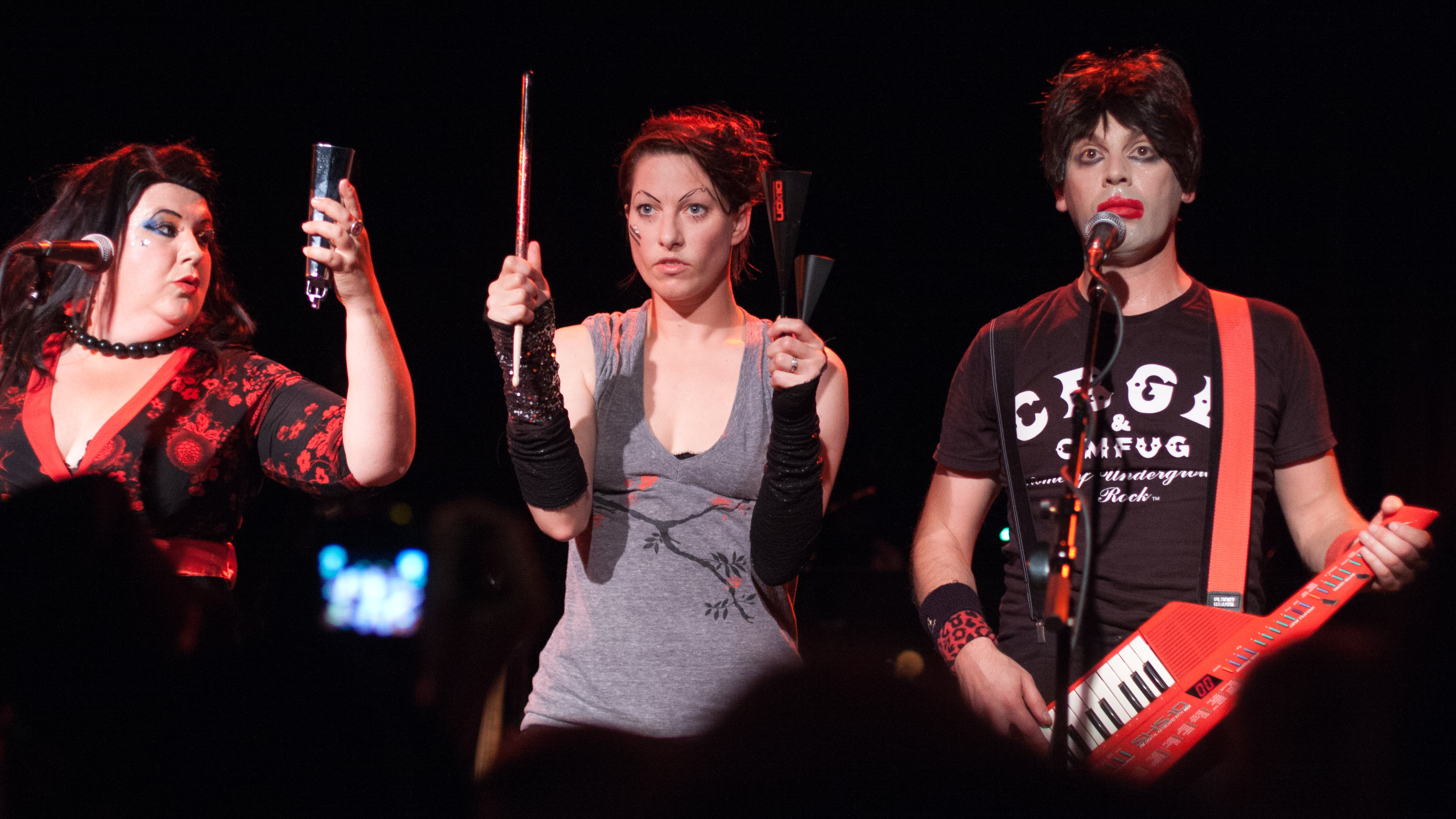
Die Roten Punkte perform "Ich Bin Nicht Ein Roboter (I Am a Lion)" with Amanda Palmer at The Roxy, Los Angeles, 18 July 2012.

Die Roten Punkte (German for "The Red Dots") is a pop-music comedy duo composed of Australians Clare Bartholomew and Daniel Tobias, in the tradition of Spinal Tap and Flight of The Conchords. Like The White Stripes, the band members (Bartholomew and Tobias) claim to be a brother and sister, named Otto Rot and Astrid Rot, and they banter and sing in German accents of questionable authenticity.

The band has released four studio albums.

== Band members ==
- Astrid Rot – vocals, drums, glockenspiel, accordion
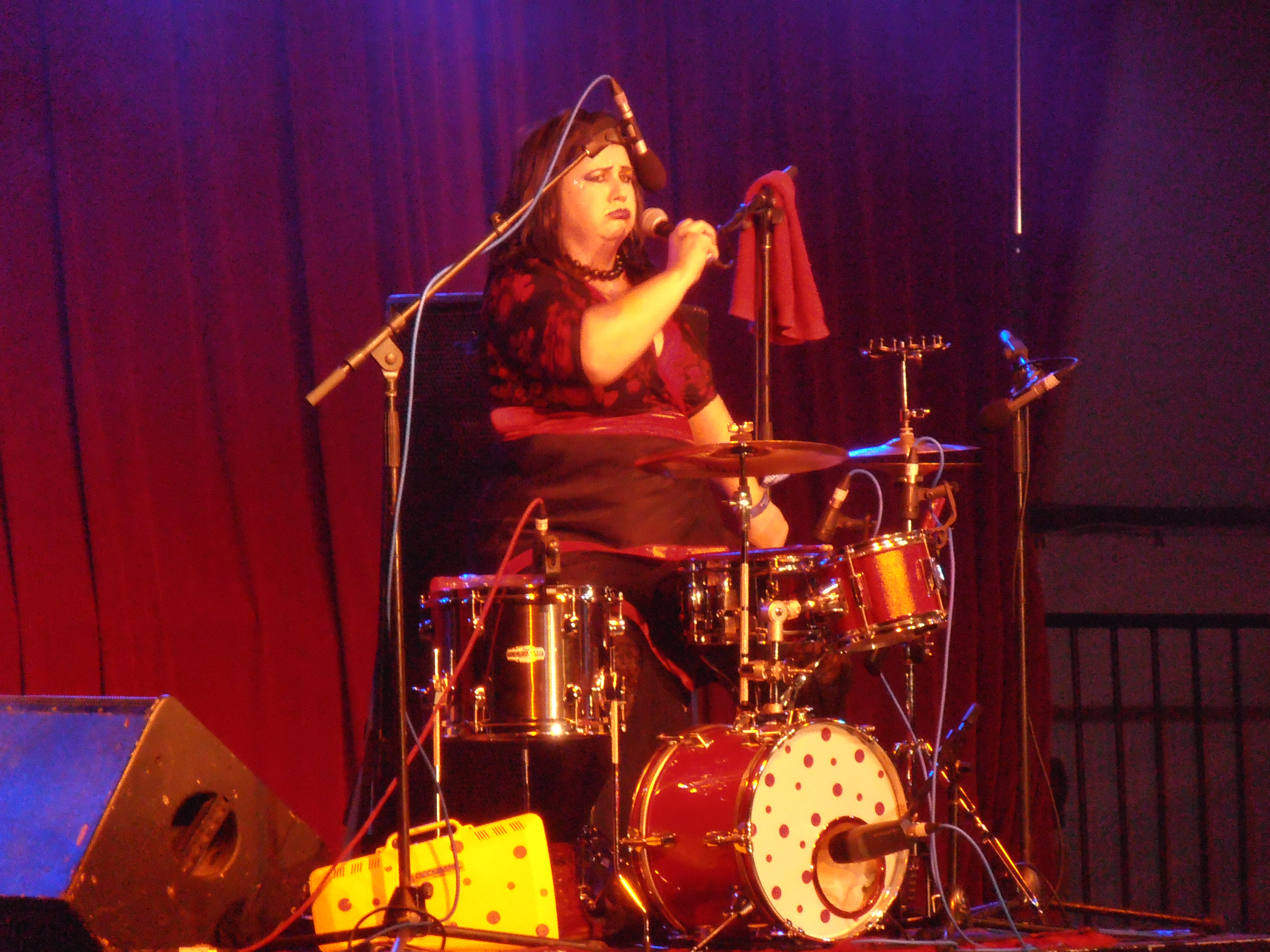
  Astrid Rot performing at the Woodford Folk Festival in 2011
- Otto Rot – vocals, guitar, keytar, loops
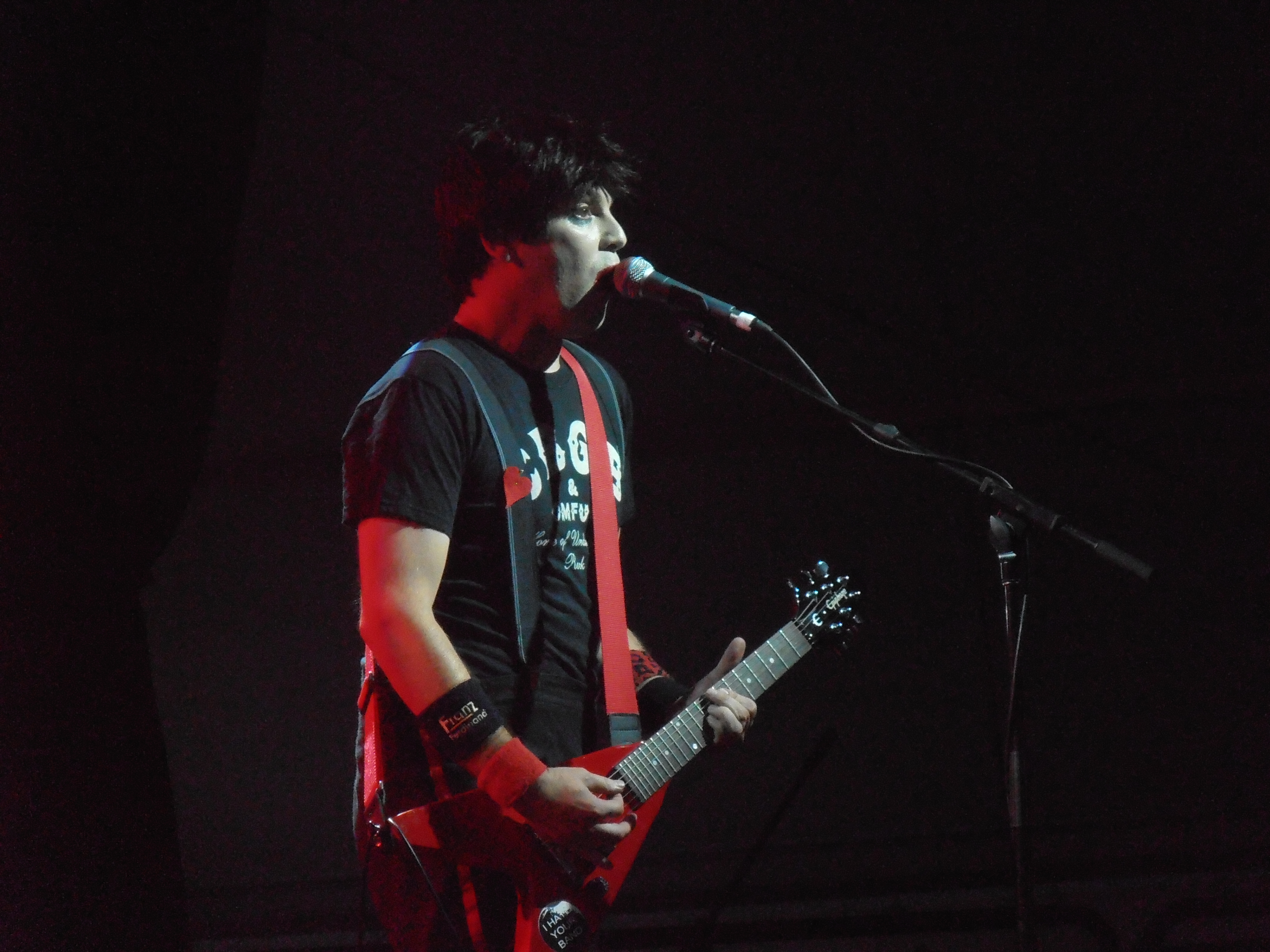
  Otto Rot performing at the Woodford Folk Festival in 2012

== Discography ==
- Die Roten Fahrten ("The Red Journeys", 2006)
- Super Musikant ("Super Musician", 2008)
- Kunst Rock (Art Rock) 2010
- Eurosmash! 2014

== Songs ==
- "Ich Bin Nicht Ein Roboter (I Am a Lion)"
- "Rock Bang!"
- "Burger Store Dinosaur"
- "Bananenhaus (Banana House)"
- "Second Best Friend"
- "The Situation"
- "The 4:15 To Spandau Will Not Run Today"
- "Super Musikant (Super Musician)"
- "Straight Edge Girl"
- "Prince & Princess of Rock 'n' Roll"
- "It's Bad, It's Good"
- "Trying Not To Die"
- "Grunewald"
- "Automatic Door"
- "Rock 'n' Roll Monster"
