= Caroline Nin =

Caroline Nin is a French jazz singer and chanteuse, notable for her interpretations of the songs of Marlene Dietrich and Edith Piaf.

== Career ==
Nin was born in Paris and studied at Lille University. She started her career in the Paris jazz venue The Hollywood Savoy in the Place de la Bourse, interpreting the songs of Ella Fitzgerald, Billie Holiday, and Sarah Vaughan. In 1991, she moved to London, where she became involved in the London pub jazz scene, supplementing her income from club and pub gigs by working as a life model at the Slade School of Art.

She was spotted by British singer Marc Almond, who asked her to perform at his Freedom Theatre venue in Soho. The French Institute, which promotes French culture in Britain, booked her for tours around England in 1994–5. A breakthrough for her career came when Vidal Sassoon spotted her as a suitable musical act to put on at his worldwide hairdressing conventions. She made her first international tour of Japan, China, Taiwan, Germany, Greece, and Finland in 1995. In the same year she performed both her Piaf show and her Scarlet Stories show at Don't tell Mamma on 43rd Street, New York.

In 1998 she won an Edinburgh Festival Herald Angel Award for Best Cabaret Show with The Last Show and at the 1999 Edinburgh Festival, The Scotsman gave her show, Lush Life, a five-star review.

Nin has toured the world extensively, performing at the Royal Festival Hall (London), and the Sydney Opera House.
