= John Wegner =

German-born Australian operatic baritone (1950–2019)

- Born: 16 January 1950; West Germany
- Died: 17 November 2019; Sydney
- Education: Victorian College of the Arts; Parade College
- Occupation: Operatic baritone

John Wegner AO (16 January 1950 – 17 November 2019) was a German-born Australian operatic baritone.

== Awards ==
In the 2016 Queen's Birthday Honours Wegner was appointed an Officer of the Order of Australia (AO) for "distinguished service to the performing arts as a world renowned operatic bass-baritone, and as an ambassador for the cultural reputation of Australia".

=== Mo Awards ===
The Australian Entertainment Mo Awards (commonly known informally as the Mo Awards), were annual Australian entertainment industry awards. They recognise achievements in live entertainment in Australia from 1975 to 2016.

Year	Nominee / work	Award	Result (wins only)
1998	John Wegner	Operatic Performance of the Year	Won
