= Alberto Remedios =

British operatic tenor (1935–2016)

- Born: Alberto Telisforo Remedios; 27 February 1935; Liverpool, Lancashire, England, UK
- Died: 11 June 2016 (aged 81); Sydney, New South Wales, Australia
- Occupation: Opera singer
- Spouses: Shirley Swindells (m. 1958; div. 1965); Judy Hosken (m. 1966)
- Children: Antony, Richard, Tonina
- Awards: Commander of British Empire (appointment 1981)

Alberto Remedios CBE (27 February 1935 – 11 June 2016) was a British operatic tenor, especially noted for his interpretations of Wagner's heldentenor roles.

== Biography ==
Alberto Remedios was born in Liverpool and began his working life as a shipyard welder. He left school at 15 to play football semi-professionally for New Brighton at Wallasey. He also studied singing with Edwin Francis, who also taught Rita Hunter. Following National Service, he was offered a place at the Royal College of Music with Clive Carey, where he won the Queen's Prize in 1957. He sang a wide variety of roles with the Sadler's Wells Opera—the forerunner of English National Opera—including Alfredo in La traviata, the title role in Gounod's Faust, Samson in Saint-Saëns' Samson and Delilah, Bacchus in Ariadne auf Naxos and Max in Der Freischütz.

Remedios went to Australia with the Sutherland-Williamson company in 1965. The company led by Richard Bonynge included Lauris Elms, John Alexander, and Luciano Pavarotti. The offer to tour came about by chance. Remedios, dining in an Italian restaurant in London was offered a free meal if he sang; fortuitously Joan Sutherland was also in the restaurant that night. The tour included La traviata, Lucia di Lammermoor, Semiramide and Faust. A recording of Remedios singing Alfredo in La traviata, with Joan Sutherland's Violetta, was released by Desiree Records in 2014.

He is especially remembered for his performances in Wagner, especially as Siegfried in the Glen Byam Shaw production of The Ring for Sadler's Wells Opera, conducted by Reginald Goodall. These performances were recorded in 1973, preserving Remedios' partnerships with Norman Bailey as Wotan and Rita Hunter as Brünnhilde. He later became the first English tenor to sing Siegfried at Covent Garden since Walter Widdop in the 1930s. He was also memorable as Walther von Stolzing in the ground-breaking 1968 Sadler's Wells The Mastersingers of Nuremberg, also conducted by Reginald Goodall.

Most remarkable of all was the occasion when Remedios, despite a slight chest infection, and due to the illness of another singer, played the roles of both Siegmund in Die Walküre, the title role in Siegfried, and also Siegfried in Götterdämmerung, within a complete cycle of the Ring during one week, these being at the Empire Theatre, Liverpool performances of the tour.

Remedios sang the role of Mark in the first recording of Tippett's The Midsummer Marriage.

Remedios performed in many of the world's leading operatic venues, including the Metropolitan Opera in New York City, Seattle, Frankfurt, San Francisco and Buenos Aires.

He was the subject of This Is Your Life in 1976 when he was surprised by Eamonn Andrews.

== Recordings ==
- Tippett: The Midsummer Marriage Mark, in the first recording .
- Excerpts from Semiramide, Faust, La Traviata, La Sonnambula. Joan Sutherland, Elizabeth Harwood, Monica Sinclair, Lauris Elms; Luciano Pavarotti, John Alexander, Alberto Remedios, Opthof, Rouleau, Cross, others. Sutherland-Williamson Grand Opera Company Orchestra and Chorus, Bonynge/Weibel. Desirée Records CD 2965 (Norbeck, Peters & Ford, dist., 802-868-9300)
- Bizet: Carmen (In English) - Pring, Remedios, Curphey, Chard; Braithwaite. London, 1975
- Cilea: Adriana Lecouvreur (In English) - Carlyle, Remedios, Bainbridge; Erede. London, 1971
- Massenet: Manon (In English) - Harwood, Remedios, Chard, Blackburn, Dowling; Mackerras. London, 1974
- Wagner: Die Walküre (In English) - Hunter, June, Bailey, Remedios, Howard, Grant; Goodall. ENO, 1970
- Wagner: Götterdämmerung (In English) - Hunter, Remedios, Grant, Bailey, Hammond-Stroud; Goodall. ENO, 1971
- Wagner: Lohengrin (In English) - Remedios, Curphey, Turner, Sharpe, Herincx, Grant; Braithwaite. London, 1971
- Wagner: Siegfried (In English) - Remedios, Hunter, Garrard, Dempsey, Hammond-Stroud, Grant, Masterson; Goodall. London, 1973
- Wagner: The Ring Cycle (In English) Hunter, Remedios, Bailey/Garrard; Goodall/Mackerras. London, 1970- 1973
- Wagner: Lohengrin sung in English; Lohengrin – Alberto Remedios, Elsa – Karen Bureau, Ortrud – Nance Grant, Telramund – Geoffrey Chard, King Henry – Noel Mangin, Herald – David Brennan; Melbourne Symphony Orchestra, conductor Richard Divall. Australian Radio Broadcast November 1985. CD91241
- Hector Berlioz: Les Troyens – sung in English; Margreta Elkins (Cassandre), Robert Allman (Chorèbe), Alberto Remedios (Enée), Suzanne Johnston (Ascagne), Lauris Elms (Didon), Heather Begg (Anna), Richard Greager (Iopas/Helenus), Noel Mangin (Priam/Narbal), John Wood (Panthée); Melbourne Symphony Orchestra, Melbourne Chorale & Victoria State Opera Chorus, Richard Divall

== Personal life, retirement, and death ==
He married his second wife, Judy Hosken, an Australian dancer, in 1966. Remedios performed regularly in Australia – he sang in concert performances of Götterdämmerung at the Sydney Opera House in the late 1970s with Rita Hunter, conducted by Sir Charles Mackerras, and sang Lohengrin for Victoria State Opera in 1985 conducted by Richard Divall, in a production by August Everding. His brother Ramon also had a singing career as a tenor; on many occasions they both appeared in performances by English National Opera of The Mastersingers. In 1999 Remedios emigrated to Sydney, Australia. He died in Sydney on 11 June 2016, aged 81.

== Awards ==
- Queen's Prize, Royal College of Music, 1957.
- First prize in the Bulgarian International Opera Contest, 1963.
- Appointed a Commander of the Order of the British Empire (CBE), 1981 Birthday Honours.
