= Richard Divall =

Australian conductor and musicologist

Richard Divall AO OBE
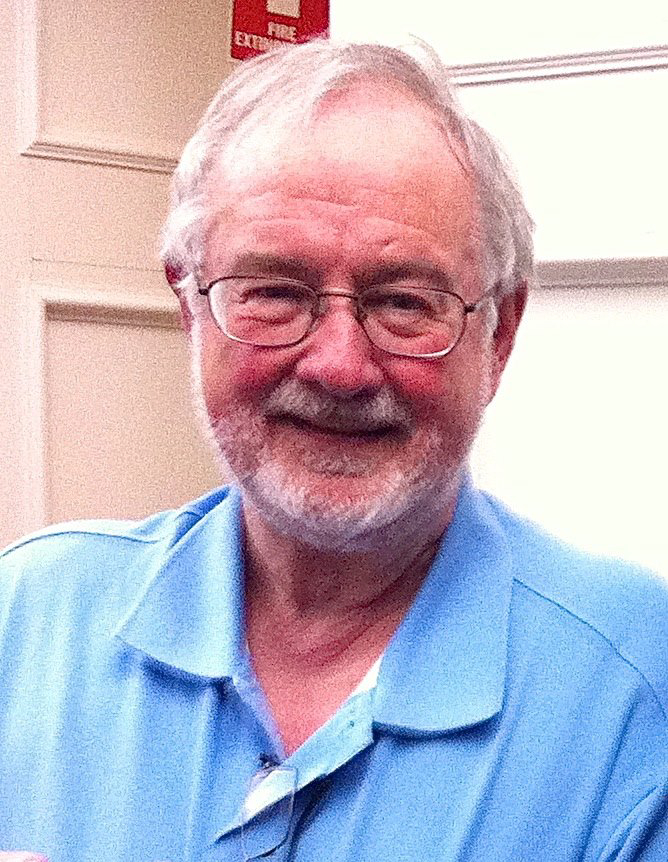
- Born: 9 September 1945; Sydney
- Died: 15 January 2017 (aged 71)
- Occupations: Conductor and musicologist

Richard Sydney Divall AO OBE (9 September 1945 – 15 January 2017) was an Australian conductor and musicologist.

Born in Sydney, and after leaving Manly Boys High School, Divall joined the Australian Broadcasting Commission as a music producer in the early 1960s for nine years before working as a trainee conductor for Opera Queensland. In 1972, on the invitation of Dame Joan Hammond and Peter Burch, he became the inaugural music director of the Victoria State Opera in Melbourne, where he remained for 25 years. A further five years were spent as principal resident conductor of Opera Australia. His teachers included Joseph Post, Nikolaus Harnoncourt, Sir Charles Mackerras, Sir Reginald Goodall and Wolfgang Wagner. He was the chief adjudicator for the Herald Sun Aria, an annual Australia-wide competition for young opera singers held at Hamer Hall, Melbourne. Divall was a regular guest conductor of the Hong Kong Philharmonic Orchestra.

== Repertoire ==
Divall conducted many concerts, ballets and 151 operas, particularly works of the late baroque, Mozart, Handel, Gounod, Berlioz and Verdi. These included the complete operas of Claudio Monteverdi, Berlioz's Les Troyens and Richard Strauss' Elektra. He conducted Verdi's Don Carlos, the first opera to be staged in the State Theatre of the Victorian Arts Centre in 1984.

His repertoire included Lohengrin and Tannhäuser by Wagner. The most recent operas he directed were Donizetti's Maria Stuarda, Hasse's Antonio e Cleopatra, Bizet's Les pêcheurs de perles, and Puccini's final opera Turandot at Monash University.

== Academic career ==
Divall was a vice-chancellor's professorial fellow at Monash University and an honorary principal fellow in music at the University of Melbourne, and the University of Malta.

As a musicologist he edited over 150 works of early Maltese composers especially from the period of the knights, including the complete sacred music and operas by Nicolas Isouard (1773–1818). He was editing the sacred music and operas of Girolamo Abos (1715–1760).

Four volumes in his editions of 24 works of Michelangelo Vella have been published by Lyrebird Press [Paris/Melbourne]. Divall was associated with several residential colleges of the University of Melbourne, first Queen's College (of which he was a fellow) and later Newman College (where he was a member of the SCR). In 2014, he was appointed an honorary research fellow at the University of Divinity, Melbourne, and in September 2014 a visiting professor of music at King's College London.

For 45 years, Divall pioneered the study of, and edited and published many volumes of early Australian music. He was the chairman of the Marshall-Hall Trust, and was completing an edition of the complete works of the English baroque composer Michael Christian Festing, and the complete sacred music of Girolamo Abos. Divall worked in several fields at Monash, was a member of the committee for the construction of the new Sir Zelman Cowen School of Music, as well as assisting the staff and students at that school. In 2015 he was the co-producer of the ANZAC Commemorative CD Gallipoli – A Tribute, which was sponsored by the Ian Potter Foundation and Monash University.

== Publications ==
- Complete works of Carl Linger, 1971
- Symphonies, Cipriani Potter, Samuel Wesley, 1980
- Concerto for Violin and Orchestra, Op. 29 by Charles Edward Horsley (Melbourne: Lyrebird Press, 2008)
- Edited works by Gluck, Rameau, Handel, Wesley, Bellini, Verdi, the complete sacred music of Nicolo Isouard, and the complete works of Michael Christian Festing (1705–1752).

== Recordings ==
=== Audio ===
- Lohengrin by Richard Wagner, sung in English; Lohengrin – Alberto Remedios, Elsa – Karen Bureau, Ortrud – Nance Grant, Telramund – Geoffrey Chard, King Henry – Noel Mangin, Herald – David Brennan; Melbourne Symphony Orchestra, conductor Richard Divall. Victoria State Opera. Australian Radio Broadcast November 1985. CD91241
- Les Troyens by Hector Berlioz, sung in English; Margreta Elkins (Cassandre), Robert Allman (Chorèbe), Alberto Remedios (Enée), Suzanne Johnston (Ascagne), Lauris Elms (Didon), Heather Begg (Anna), Richard Greager (Iopas/Helenus), Noel Mangin (Priam/Narbal), John Wood (Panthée); Victoria State Opera, Melbourne Symphony Orchestra, Melbourne Chorale & Victoria State Opera Chorus, Richard Divall
- Maria Stuarda by Gaetano Donizetti, sung in English; Elizabeth I – Nance Grant, Mary Stuart – June Bronhill, Earl of Leicester – David Parker, Lord Talbot – John Bolton-Wood, Lord Cecil – Barry Clark, Ann Kennedy – Janet Dawson, Victorian State Opera, Victorian State Opera Orchestra and Chorus. Melbourne 24 July 1976, conductor: Richard Divall
- Roméo et Juliette by Charles Gounod; Leanne Kennealy – Julian Gavin; conducted by Richard Divall – Sydney 1999

=== DVD ===
- Alcina by George Frideric Handel, Joan Sutherland, Sally-Anne Russell, Wendy Dixon, Elizabeth Campbell, Glen Winslade, Stephen Bennett; conducted by Richard Divall. Australian Opera, Australian Opera Chorus. Sydney 1987

== Honours ==
Divall was awarded honorary degrees from Monash and Australian Catholic University and a PhD in theology by the University of Divinity [Catholic Theological College] in church history and 18th century Maltese sacred music. He was an officer of the Order of Australia (2009), an officer of the Order of the British Empire (1981 Birthday Honours) and was awarded a Spanish knighthood in 2008.

He was a fellow of Queen's College, Melbourne, and was on the SCR of Newman College at the University of Melbourne. He was a Knight of Malta in solemn religious profession and was active in hospitaller and charitable works in that order.

- Professor Richard Divall AO, OBE
- Officer of the Order of the British Empire, OBE (1981)
- Officer of The Order of Australia, AO (2009)
- Officer of the Most Venerable Order of St John, OStJ (2012)
- Fellow, Royal Numismatic Society (1985)
- Fellow, Royal Asiatic Society (1985)
- Fellow, Queen's College, University of Melbourne in 1987
- D. Lett (Hon Causa) Monash (1992)
- Doc. Univ. (ACU) 2005)
- PhD. UD. (2014)
- Dame Joan Hammond Award in 1988
- Bayreuth Prize in 1990
- Cavaliere di Giustizia (Order of Malta), Cavaliere di San Giorgio (Spain)
- Commendatore al Merito Melitense, DLett (Hon Mon) in 1989, for historical research
- FRAS, FRNS.
- Professor Richard Divall AO OBE D Lett (Hon Mon) Doc Univ (ACU) PhD (UD) FRNS FRAS

=== Bernard Heinze Memorial Award ===
The Sir Bernard Heinze Memorial Award is given to a person who has made an outstanding contribution to music in Australia.

Year	Nominee / work	Award	Result	Ref.
2004	Richard Divall	Sir Bernard Heinze Memorial Award	awarded	
