= Victoria State Opera =

Opera company in Victoria, Australia

The Victoria State Opera (VSO), based in Melbourne, Australia, was founded in Melbourne in 1962. The company, founded by Leonard Spira, was a move into grand opera by the then amateur Gilbert and Sullivan-oriented Victorian Light Opera Co. The name changed to the Victorian Opera Company in 1964 to reflect the company's broader repertoire.

== Early years Victoria Opera 1962–1976 ==
An attempt to professionalise the company as the Victorian Opera Co was made by Alfred Ruskin, foundation chairman and Peter Burch, general manager (1970–1974), who in 1971 appointed Dame Joan Hammond to the board. In 1972 she brought Richard Divall to Melbourne. Richard Divall was to remain with the company as Music Director until 1996. In 1976 Dame Joan Hammond accepted a position at the Victorian College of the Arts and was replaced as chairman by John Day (1976–1982).

Richard Divall instantly made his mark on the company, raising it to a new level of professionalism with a landmark production Of Monteverdi's Coronation of Poppea directed by Rod Anderson and starring Marilyn Richardson. Through these early years the company made a major contribution to the popularization of Opera through its highly successful schools touring productions of specially commissioned works employing and giving work and experience to younger singers from the company. Another highlight of these years was a production of Donizetti's Maria Stuarda in July 1976, directed by Robin Lovejoy with a cast including Nance Grant and June Bronhill conducted by Richard Divall. This was to be the last opera produced under the Victoria Opera Company banner.

== Victoria State Opera 1976–1995 ==
1996 Company letterhead of the Victoria State Opera

In 1976 the new chairman John Day added the word 'State' to its title to become Victoria State Opera. He is quoted in The Age on 29 July 1976, saying that the new title had "more prestige" and "a more official cachet." He stated further that, "The State Opera would not seek to emulate the lavishness of Australian Opera Company productions." It would concentrate on attracting younger audiences with modern and experimental productions combining opera with music and drama.

The subsidy from the Victorian State Government in 1975 was AUD165,000. In 1976 the VSO sought an increase to AUD$280,000 with an unchanged Federal Government subsidy of AUD56,000.

The first production under the new banner was Gluck's Orfeo and Eurydice, starring Margaret Field, which opened at the National Theatre, St Kilda on 30 July 1976.

Significant appointments in these early years include:

- Ken Mackenzie-Forbes who joined the company as general manager in 1976. Ken Mackenzie-Forbes was Chief Executive from 1976 until 1995.
- Jeffrey Sher QC became chairman from 1979 to 1982
- Sir Rupert Hamer AC KCMG ED was chairman from 1982 to 1995

In 1977 Robin Lovejoy was appointed Artistic Advisor to the Victoria State Opera. VSO productions he directed include:

- Monteverdi's L'Orfeo (1977) Princess Theatre, Melbourne
- Debussy's Pelléas et Mélisande (1977) Princess Theatre, Melbourne
- Mozart's Idomeneo, designed by John Truscott, starring Australian tenor, Ronald Dowd (1978) Princess Theatre, Melbourne
- Bizet's The Pearl Fishers, John Truscott (1979) Princess Theatre, Melbourne
- Monteverdi's The Return of Ulysses (1980) Princess Theatre, Melbourne
- Johann Strauss' Die Fledermaus, for which he also adapted the dialogue (1981)

In 1982 Sir Rupert Hamer, the former premier of Victoria, became Chairman of the Victoria State Opera and was to remain in this position until 1995. It was a fitting appointment as Sir Rupert had been a vigorous supporter of the building of the Arts Centre Melbourne complex. From 1984 the company performed in the newly built State Theatre, part of the Arts Centre Melbourne, where it presented at least four to five operas a year over two seasons, which eventually rivalled those of the Australian Opera given in the same space. At its height, the VSO had over 13,000 season subscribers. In 1985 Brian Stacey was appointed as Head of Music.

Other notable production highlights include appearances by Suzanne Steele, most notably in the lead role of La belle Hélène and as Eurydice in Orpheus in the Underworld. There were also Don Giovanni, Tannhäuser, The Pearl Fishers (which toured to Sydney), The Tales of Hoffmann, Faust, Aida, Il trovatore, The Barber of Seville, The Magic Flute, Andrea Chénier, Turandot, Madama Butterfly (the traditional production by Andrew Sinclair or the Ken Russell production in 1986, as part of the Spoleto Festival) and a production of Lohengrin produced by August Everding. Acknowledging their Gilbert and Sullivan heritage, 1995 saw Rhonda Burchmore star in a production of Ruddigore at the State Theatre.

As the VSO designed their productions for the State Theatre, a 2077-seat theatre with one of the largest stages in the world, they were able to make full use of the facilities i.e. revolving stage, hydraulic stages and were able to create imaginative and exciting effects in their productions. Their first opera in the State Theatre was the new John Copley production of Verdi's Don Carlos in 1984. The curtains remained open during set changes so the audience could marvel at the machinery.

== World premieres ==
- Inner Voices (chamber opera) by Brian Howard and Louis Nowra, 2 October 1979 (Grant Street Theatre, Melbourne), conducted by Richard Divall; cast included Lyndon Terracini
- Hunger by Neil Clifton, 1982
- Metamorphosis, opera by Brian Howard and Steven Berkoff, 30 September 1983 (St Martin's Theatre, Melbourne), conducted by Graham Cox; cast included Lyndon Terracini
- Fly, an opera in two acts and four scenes by Barry Conyngham and Murray Copland, 25 August 1984 (State Theatre, Victorian Arts Centre, Melbourne), conducted by John Hopkins; cast included Anthony Roden

== Merger with Australian Opera 1996 ==
The company decided to merge with the Australian Opera. In that merger Richard Divall was appointed Principal Resident Conductor of Opera Australia from 1996 until 2001, Lindy Hume was appointed Associate Artistic Director with overall control, remaining in Sydney with Moffatt Oxenbould. That merger, which was to cover opera in New South Wales and Victoria, was not a success, and the newly named Opera Australia cut back the staff in Melbourne, and, while retaining an office in Melbourne, returned the great majority of its operations to Sydney.

The Elizabethan Trust Melbourne Orchestra, formed in 1969 to support the Australian Opera and the Australian Ballet, survived the merger. In 1987 it was renamed the State Orchestra of Victoria (now Orchestra Victoria) and continues to support opera and ballet in the State Theatre. Opera Australia took on the responsibilities of performing opera in both the states of Victoria and New South Wales. More recently, the Victorian Opera has been formed with funding from the Victorian government to provide an opera company for Melbourne and Victoria.

== Recordings ==
- Lohengrin – Richard Wagner sung in English; Lohengrin – Alberto Remedios, Elsa – Karen Bureau, Ortrud – Nance Grant, Telramund – Geoffrey Chard, King Henry – Noel Mangin, Herald – David Brennan; Melbourne Symphony Orchestra, conductor Richard Divall. Australian Radio Broadcast November 1985. CD91241
- Les Troyens – Hector Berlioz sung in English; Margreta Elkins (Cassandre), Robert Allman (Chorèbe), Alberto Remedios (Enée), Suzanne Johnston (Ascagne), Lauris Elms (Didon), Heather Begg (Anna), Richard Greager (Iopas/Helenus), Noel Mangin (Priam/Narbal), John Wood (Panthée); Melbourne Symphony Orchestra, Melbourne Chorale & Victoria State Opera Chorus, Richard Divall
- Maria Stuarda – Gaetano Donizetti sung in English; Elizabeth – Nance Grant, Mary Stuart – June Bronhill, Earl of Leicester – David Parker, Lord Talbot – John Bolton-Wood, Lord Cecil – Barry Clark, Ann Kennedy – Janet Dawson; Victorian State Opera Orchestra and Chorus. Melbourne, 24 July 1976, conductor Richard Divall
