= Rosina (opera) =

Opera by William Shield

Rosina is a 1782 comic opera by William Shield to an English-language libretto by Frances Brooke. The opera was written in 1771/72 but first performed at the Theatre Royal, Covent Garden, on 31 December 1782.

It was intended to be used as a light afterpiece to a more "serious" work sung in Italian. Such works were common at the time, although Rosina is the only one that has survived in the form of a complete score. Rosina has many features associated with later English comic opera, and even modern musical comedy – including the use of English, spoken dialogue, lightness of theme, and the use of folk as well as popular melodies. At least to that degree, it may be regarded as one of the ancestors of the musical, and Shield as one of the first composers of musicals.

It was popular at the time. On 27 January 1808 the opening performance of the Sunderland Theatre featured The Cure for the Heart Ach and Rosina in a benefit performance for sailors from Tyne and Wear held prisoners of war in France.

== Source material ==
The music for "Henry Cull'd The Flowrets Bloom" is taken from "Torna pure al caro bene" in Sacchini's Rinaldo (1780).

== Recordings ==
- Rosina – complete recording with original instrumentation but on modern instruments. With Margreta Elkins (Rosina), Elizabeth Harwood (Phoebe), Monica Sinclair (William), Robert Tear (Mr. Belville), Kenneth MacDonald (Captain Belville), Ambrosian Singers and London Symphony Orchestra, Richard Bonynge conducting. Decca 1966, 50 minutes.
