= Rita Hunter =

British operatic dramatic soprano

Rita Hunter CBE (15 August 1933 – 29 April 2001) was a British operatic dramatic soprano.

== Biography ==
Rita Hunter was born in Wallasey, Merseyside and lived in Limekiln Lane. During her childhood, her parents, both fans of music hall, would take Rita to many of the final tours of the last music-hall artists. She studied singing in Liverpool with Edwin Francis and later in London with Redvers Llewellyn and Clive Carey. She joined the Sadler's Wells Opera Company in 1957 and sang in the chorus with them for two years before touring with the Carl Rosa Opera Company. She then obtained a grant from the Countess of Munster Trust, which made it possible for her to study for a year with Dame Eva Turner. After this she went back to the Company as a principal, where her roles included Senta in The Flying Dutchman, Musetta in La bohème, Odabella in Attila, Fata Morgana in The Love for Three Oranges, Donna Anna in Don Giovanni, Amelia in A Masked Ball, Santuzza in Cavalleria rusticana, Elizabeth in Don Carlos and Leonora in Il trovatore.

Rita Hunter will be remembered as one of the major Wagnerian sopranos of the later 20th century, especially for her performances as all three of the Brünnhildes in the Ring cycle, conducted by Reginald Goodall at the English National Opera. In this production she was partnered by Alberto Remedios (who had studied singing at the same time as Hunter in Liverpool with Edwin Francis) as Siegfried, and Norman Bailey as Wotan. The recordings based on this production, with the same artists, are regarded as amongst the finest available, even though they are sung, in accordance with ENO practice, in English.

In an interview in 1979 Hunter expressed her dissatisfaction with having to sing the same part in both English and the original languages. "I find it very difficult learning a role in different languages. The phrasing is different - one has to take breath in a different place." She also recalled having to know "Santuzza in three different English translations as well as in Italian". She found Italian easier to learn and memorize than German.

In the Glen Byam Shaw Ring production, the quality of Hunter's singing and interpretation enabled audiences to set aside her outsize stature (which conformed to all prejudices about Wagnerian sopranos), and few have matched her conviction as Brünnhilde. She made her debut at the New York Metropolitan Opera on 19 December 1972, in Die Walküre, with great success (conductor Erich Leinsdorf and Dame Gwyneth Jones as Sieglinde). She performed the Götterdämmerung Brünnhilde at Covent Garden, and also sang the part of Senta there at short notice. Hunter's later Metropolitan Opera performances of Die Walküre in 1975 featured Birgit Nilsson as Sieglinde and were conducted by Sixten Ehrling.

She also performed in Wagner and other operas in Munich, Seattle, New Orleans, San Francisco, and with the Welsh National Opera.

Among conductors with whom she worked whom she found sympathetic to the singer, she cited Sir Simon Rattle, Carlo Felice Cillario and Richard Bonynge.

== Honours ==
In 1980 she was appointed a Commander of the Order of the British Empire (CBE). She was also the recipient of Hon. RAM. Hon. DMUS (Doctor of Music Liverpool University) and Hon.DLIT (Doctor of Letters Warwick University)

== Autobiography ==
In 1981 she moved to Sydney and joined the Australian Opera. Her autobiography, Wait till the sun shines, Nellie, was published by Hamish Hamilton in 1986. She died in Sydney in 2001, aged 67 and is survived by her daughter, Mairwyn Curtis (nee Hunter-Thomas) and her two grandchildren.
