= Norman Bailey (bass-baritone) =

British-American opera singer (1933–2021)

Norman Bailey CBE
- Born: 23 March 1933; Birmingham, England
- Died: 15 September 2021 (aged 88); Rexburg, Idaho, U.S.
- Education: Rhodes University; Vienna Music Academy
- Occupation: Operatic baritone
- Organizations: Deutsche Oper am Rhein; English National Opera

Norman Stanley Bailey CBE (23 March 1933 – 15 September 2021) was a British operatic bass-baritone who appeared in leading roles in major opera venues. After an early career in Austria and Germany, he settled in England and was associated with the English National Opera. One of his signature roles was Hans Sachs in Wagner's Die Meistersinger von Nürnberg, which he performed at La Scala in Milan in 1968 and at the Bayreuth Festival the following year. Later that year he was called upon at the last minute to play the part at the Royal Opera House in London when Hubert Hoffman had to pull out with a sore throat. He also played this part in his debut at the Metropolitan Opera in New York City in 1976.

== Career ==
Bailey was born in Birmingham, England on 23 March 1933. He emigrated to South Africa with his parents after the Second World War. His talent was first recognised when he was studying theology at Rhodes University in Grahamstown. He changed to music on the advice of his singing teacher after only 2 lessons. Bailey later received vocal training at the Vienna Music Academy. He finished his studies with Josef Witt, Adolf Vogel and Julius Patzak in Vienna, with F. Carvino in Düsseldorf and Clemens Kaiser-Breme in Essen.

In 1959, he made his stage debut as Tobias Mill in Rossini's La cambiale di matrimonio at the Vienna Chamber Opera. He was engaged at the Landestheater Linz from 1960 until 1963. From 1964 to 1967, he was a member of the Deutsche Oper am Rhein. He appeared in the title roles of Verdi's Rigoletto, Nabucco and Simon Boccanegra, among others.

In 1967, he first performed at La Scala in Milan, in the title role of Dallapiccola's Job, followed by Hans Sachs in Wagner's Die Meistersinger von Nürnberg the following year. He first performed in the UK in Manchester in 1967, in the title role of Mozart's Le nozze di Figaro, appearing the same year in London in the same role at Sadler's Wells (later English National Opera or ENO).

Bailey has been particularly associated with Richard Wagner's operas, including the title role of Der fliegende Holländer, which he recorded with the Chicago Symphony conducted by Georg Solti, and the role of Wotan in the Ring cycle which he sang in the ENO production conducted by Reginald Goodall. In these performances he appeared alongside Rita Hunter as Brünnhilde and Alberto Remedios as Siegfried. The recordings from live performances in English at the London Coliseum are often regarded as constituting a classic audio Ring cycle. Another major Wagner role was Hans Sachs in Die Meistersinger von Nürnberg, which he sang in many opera houses including the Bayreuth Festival in 1969 and 1970, the ENO and the New York City Opera. He recorded it with the Vienna Philharmonic conducted by Solti on Decca/London, and in English from the ENO conducted by Goodall on Chandos. In 1976, he made his Metropolitan Opera debut in this role. In 1971, he sang Amfortas in Parsifal at Covent Garden, again under Reginald Goodall's Baton, alongside Jon Vickers, Donald McIntyre and Amy Shuard.

He appeared as Barak in Die Frau ohne Schatten by Richard Strauss in a 1981 Welsh National Opera production, and as the Father in Humperdinck's Hänsel und Gretel at the ENO. Also in the 1980s, he was heard in the role of Dr. Engel in the first recording of the complete score of the operetta The Student Prince by Sigmund Romberg and Dorothy Donnelly. He also performed with the Royal Opera House and in many other opera houses around the world. In 1985, he participated in the world premiere of Alexander Goehr's Die Wiedertäufer (Behold the Sun) at the Duisburg house of the Deutsche Oper am Rhein. He made his debut with the Glyndebourne Opera in Alban Berg's Lulu in 1996 at age 65, and celebrated his seventy-fifth birthday by singing the role of Sarastro in Mozart's Die Zauberflöte at the Eliza R. Snow Performing Arts Center in Rexburg, Idaho.

Bailey appeared on BBC television and radio almost 100 times, including both performances and interviews. He was a castaway on an October 1976 edition of Desert Island Discs, and was pictured, alongside Patricia Johnson, on the cover of the 3–9 December 1977 edition of the Radio Times.

An American citizen at the time of his death, he was appointed a Commander of the Order of the British Empire (CBE) in the 1977 New Year Honours. In 1981, he was appointed Honorary Member of the Royal Academy of Music (Hon RAM).

Bailey built up a sizable teaching studio and taught for several years at the Royal College of Music, London. In Teton Valley, he joined the adjunct staff at Brigham Young University, Idaho.

== Personal life ==
In 1957, Bailey married Doreen Simpson, whom he had met in a choir. They had two sons and one daughter and divorced in 1980. He met his second wife, Kristine Ciesinski, in another musical capacity, while appearing as Hans Sachs for Cincinnati Opera in 1983. He married the American soprano in 1985, and they remained together until her death in a glider accident in June 2018. He is survived by his three children, five grandchildren, and three great-grandchildren in the UK, and in the U.S. by his sister-in-law mezzo-soprano Katherine Ciesinski (American conductor Mark Powell) and his brother-in-law IT federal sales expert Raymond Ciesinski (journalist Phoebe Eliopoulos). Bailey was a resident of Driggs, Idaho.

He died in Rexburg, Idaho, US, on 15 September 2021, at the age of 88.

== Awards ==
- 1977 Commander of the Order of the British Empire (CBE) by her Majesty, Queen Elizabeth II
- 1977 Sir Charles Santley Award
- 1981 Honorary member of the Royal Academy of Music
- 1986 Honorary doctorate from Rhodes University
- 2020 Sir Reginald Goodall Memorial Award for outstanding service to Wagner and his music from The Wagner Society of London
