= Montezuma (Graun) =

- opera seria by Carl Heinrich Graun
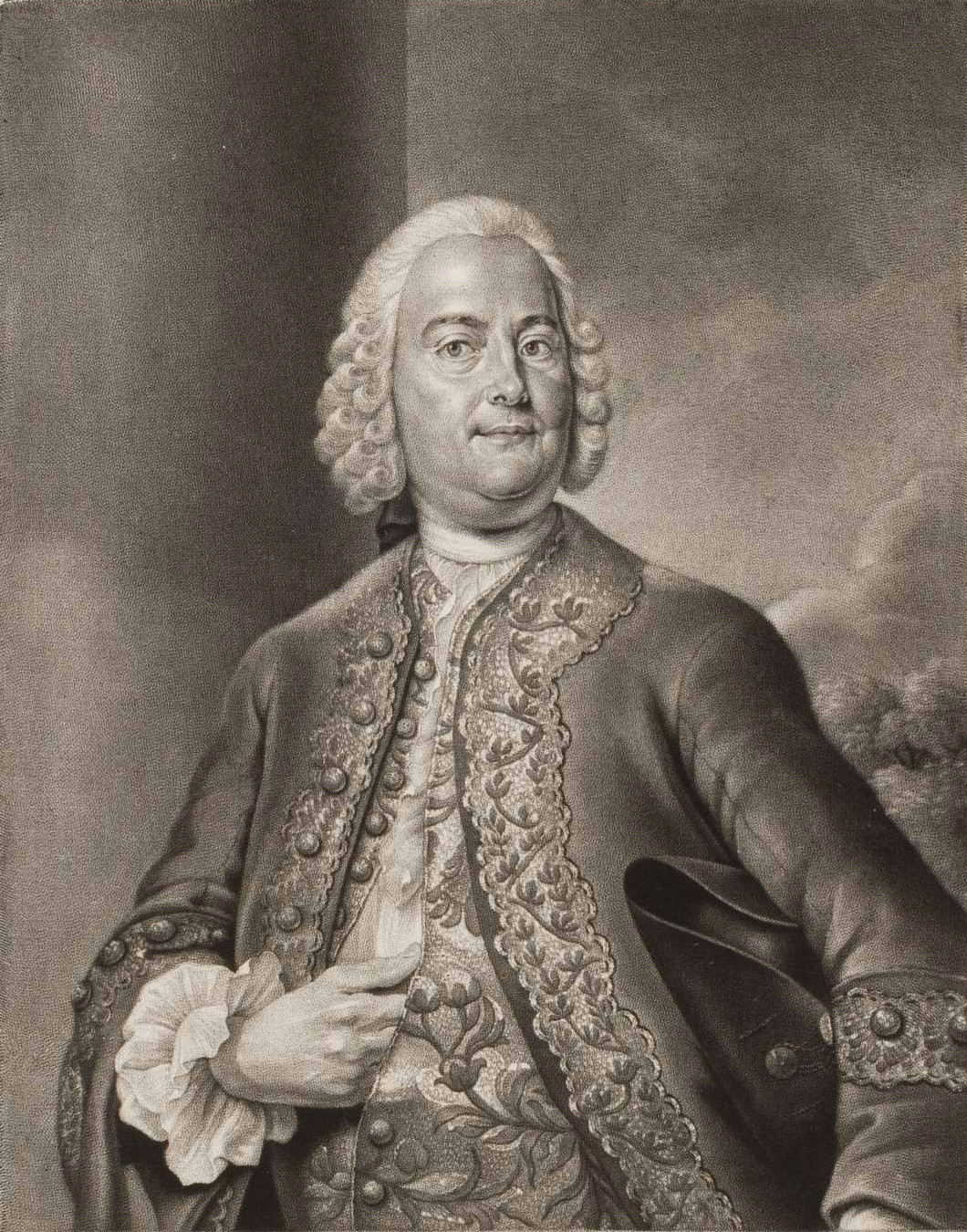
- The composer in 1752
- Librettist: Frederick the Great; Giampetro Tagliazucchi
- Language: Italian
- Premiere: 6 January 1755; Königliches Opernhaus, Berlin

Montezuma is an opera seria in three acts by the German composer Carl Heinrich Graun. The libretto was written in French by Graun's patron, Frederick the Great, the King of Prussia, and turned into an Italian libretto by Giampetro Tagliazucchi.

The work's plot concerns Hernán Cortés's conquest of Mexico and the defeat of the Aztec emperor Montezuma. It was first performed at the Königliches Opernhaus (Royal court opera) in Berlin on 6 January 1755. The title role was originally performed by a castrato, but today is performed by either a male countertenor or a female mezzo-soprano. The seven roles are Erissena (s), Eupaforice (s), Montezuma (ms), Tezeuco (alto), Pilpatoè (s), Narvès (t) and Cortès (b). In the original production, Giovanni Cinzio Tedeschi, a musico who sang under the stage name Amadori, and whose tenure in Berlin lasted only about a year, created the role of Montezuma. Giovanna Astrua portrayed Eupaforice. Antonio Huber (also spelled Uber), a musico known as Porporino, sang Cortes. The tenor Antonio Romani sang Tezeuco; the musico Paulo Bedeschi, known as Paulino, sang Pilpatoe; the musico Carlo Martinengo sang Narves; and Maria Giovanna Gasparini sang Erissena.

== Performances and recordings ==
The U.S. premiere was given on 14 February 1973 by the Associate Artists Opera Company at the Cyclorama of the Boston Center for the Arts. Ernest Tripplett (founder of the company) sang the title role, supported by Richard Conrad, Mary Strebing, Wayne Riviera, Alexander Stevenson and Luther Enstad. John Minor conducted, with scenery by William Fregosi. Montezuma was performed in Montpellier in 1990 (under Latham-König) and in Edinburgh and Madrid in 2010 (under Garrido, who made cuts), and it will be performed by Berlin's Staatsoper at the Schiller Theater in January 2012, led by Michael Hofstetter.

The first studio recording of the complete opera was made in 1991 and released on the Capriccio label. It was conducted by Johannes Goritzki. Another complete recording had been made live the previous year in Montpellier and broadcast by Radio France. One of the 2010 Madrid performances was recorded, too, and later broadcast by Czech Radio and possibly other broadcasters. Extended highlights from the opera, without the character Narvès, were recorded in 1966 by Decca: Lauris Elms in the title role, and Joan Sutherland, Elizabeth Harwood and Joseph Ward, conducted by Richard Bonynge.
