= Spiro Malas =

American bass-baritone and actor

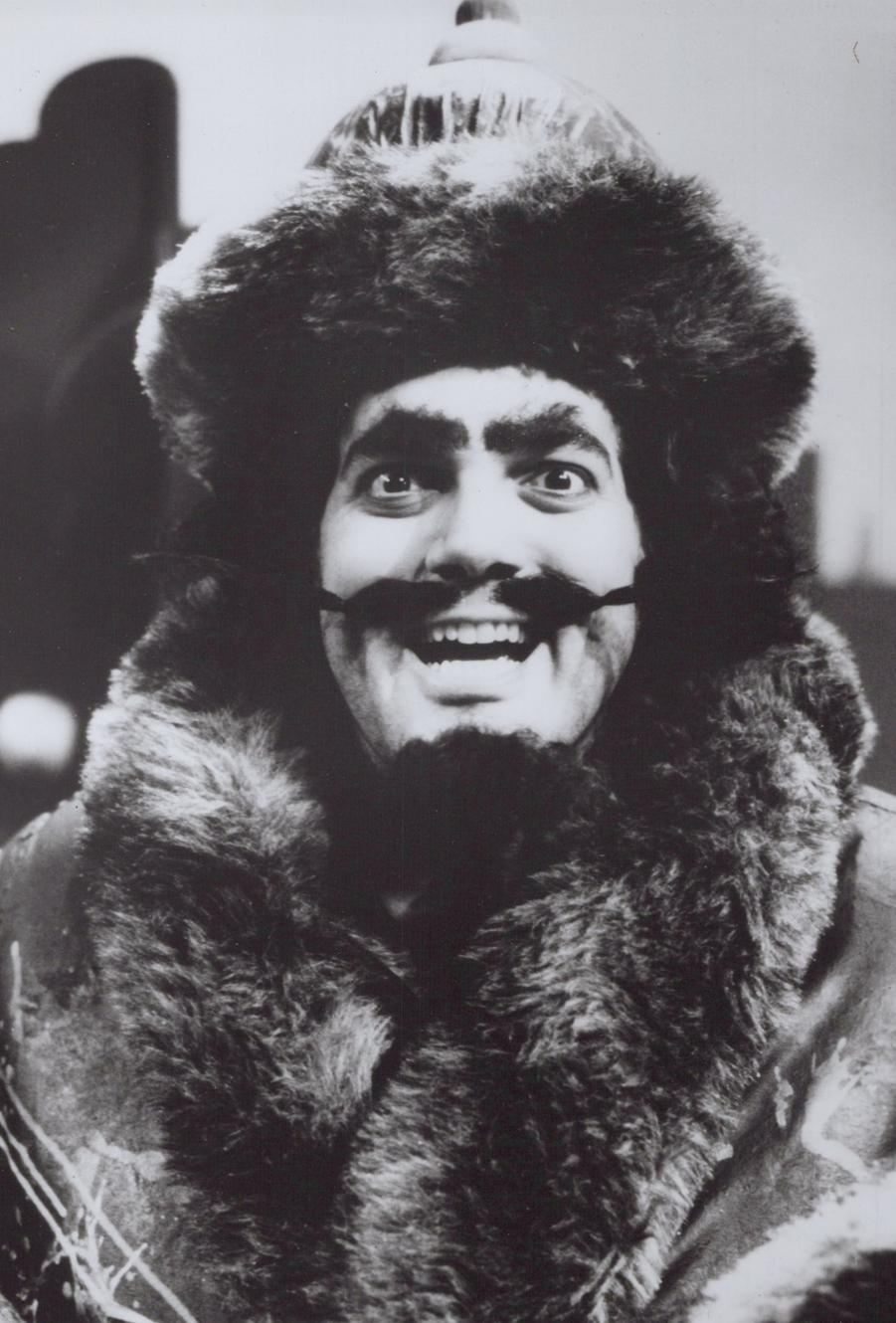
- Malas as Osmin in a 1970 performance of The Abduction from the Seraglio
- Born: Spiro Samuel Malas; January 28, 1933; Baltimore, Maryland, U.S.
- Died: June 23, 2019 (aged 86); Manhattan, New York, U.S.
- Occupations: Opera and musical theatre singer; film and television actor
- Years active: 1959–2019
- Spouse: Marlena Kleinman (m. 1963)
- Children: 2

Spiro Samuel Malas (January 28, 1933 – June 23, 2019) was a Greek-American bass-baritone opera singer and actor.

The son of Greek immigrants Sam and Lillian Malas, he was born in Baltimore, MD January 28, 1933. The family owned Duffy's, a restaurant in Baltimore's Southwest neighborhood. He attended Towson State College in Maryland and taught geography for a year after graduation while continuing his vocal training at Peabody Conservatory. He made his operatic debut in 1959 in his native Baltimore and in 1960 he won the Metropolitan Opera National Council Auditions. In 1961 he appeared at the Odeon of Herodes Atticus as King Alcinous in Peggy Glanville-Hicks' Nausicaa, an opera written for the Athens Festival. He made his New York debut at the New York City Opera as Spinelloccio in Gianni Schicchi. This way he came to the attention of Joan Sutherland and her husband, the conductor Richard Bonynge. Giorgio in I Puritani was his first collaboration with them and Sarah Caldwell's Boston Opera Group; he was subsequently asked to tour Australia with the Sutherland/Williamson International Opera Company in 1965. This led to appearances at London's Covent Garden, the New York Metropolitan Opera (1983–84) and Chicago Lyric Opera.

Malas first performed at the Metropolitan Opera in 1983 as Sgt. Sulpice in La fille du régiment opposite Dame Joan Sutherland, followed by Il barbiere di Siviglia, La bohème, Les contes d'Hoffmann, Die Fledermaus, Eugene Onegin, L'elisir d'amore, Lulu, Manon Lescaut, Der Rosenkavalier, Salome, Tosca, and Werther. He also appeared there in two new productions by Sir Peter Hall; as Zuniga in Carmen, and as Dr. Bartolo in Le nozze di Figaro. Malas was also seen on the Metropolitan Opera stage as Haly in L'italiana in Algeri opposite Marilyn Horne, and Capulet in Roméo et Juliette.

He sang leading roles in the major opera houses in Rome, Naples, Salzburg, Vienna, Florence and San Francisco. He has also appeared in televised opera, with leading symphony orchestras, and recorded the operatic repertoire with notables such as Luciano Pavarotti, Beverly Sills, Dame Kiri Te Kanawa, and Sutherland.

A leading bass-baritone with the New York City Opera for many years, he also sustained a career in television, having appeared in Spenser: For Hire, The Equalizer, Ryan's Hope, One Life to Live, Law & Order and Sex and the City. Frank Rich, theatre critic for The New York Times, commented on Malas' Drama Desk Award-nominated portrayal of the immigrant farmer Tony Esposito in the 1992 Broadway revival of The Most Happy Fella: "As acted by Mr. Malas, Tony's inner growth and redemption become the very soul of musical drama, especially as delineated in one gorgeous Loesser song after another."

In addition to his teaching at Barnard College and Columbia University, Malas also served on the faculty of the Manhattan School of Music and Curtis Institute of Music.

He was a National Patron of Delta Omicron, an international professional music fraternity.

Malas was married to Marlena Kleinman Malas, a voice teacher in New York. They had two sons, Nicol and Alexis.

Malas died June 23, 2019, in New York.

== Recordings ==
Giovanni Bononcini

- Griselda — Lauris Elms (Griselda), Joan Sutherland (Ernesto), Monica Sinclair (Gualtiero), Margreta Elkins (Almirena), Spiro Malas (Rambaldo), Ambrosian Opera Chorus, London Philharmonic Orchestra, Richard Bonynge, recorded 1967. Decca 448 977-2 (coupled with Montezuma)

Gaetano Donizetti

- La fille du régiment — Joan Sutherland, Luciano Pavarotti (Tonio), Spiro Malas (Sulpice); Richard Bonynge
- L'elisir d'amore — Joan Sutherland, Luciano Pavarotti, Spiro Malas, Maria Casula; Richard Bonynge

George Frideric Handel

- Giulio Cesare - Norman Treigle (Caesar), Beverly Sills (Cleopatra), Maureen Forrester, Beverly Wolff, Spiro Malas, New York City Opera Chorus and Orchestra, dir. Julius Rudel, RCA Victor, recorded 1967.

Gioachino Rossini

- Semiramide — Joan Sutherland (Semiramide), John Serge (Idreno), Joseph Rouleau (Assur), Spiro Malas (Oroe), Patricia Clark (Azema), Leslie Fyson (Mitrane), Michael Langdon (Spectre of Nino), Marilyn Horne (Arsace), London Symphony Orchestra, Richard Bonynge. Decca 425 481–2, recorded in 1966.
