= The Midsummer Marriage =

1955 opera by Michael Tippett

- Opera by Michael Tippett
- Librettist: Tippett
- Language: English
- Based on: The Magic Flute by Mozart
- Premiere: 27 January 1955; Covent Garden, London

The Midsummer Marriage is an opera in three acts, with music and libretto by Michael Tippett. The work's first performance was at Covent Garden, on 27 January 1955, conducted by John Pritchard. The reception of the opera was controversial, over confusion as to the libretto and Tippett's use of symbols and psychological references. The opera has received at least 10 more productions, in England, Wales, Scotland, Germany, Sweden and the United States, including two more at the Royal Opera House.

The premiere performance was recorded, and has been issued on compact disc. Covent Garden revived the work in 1968, conducted by Colin Davis, with the Ritual Dances choreographed by Gillian Lynne and in 1970, when the production formed the basis of the first commercial recording. Tippett extracted the Four Ritual Dances from the opera as a separate concert work.

== Story background ==
The story of The Midsummer Marriage was consciously modeled after Mozart's The Magic Flute. Both trace the path to marriage of one "royal" and one "common" couple: Jenifer and Mark correspond to Pamina and Tamino, the earthy Jack and Bella to Papageno and Papagena. King Fisher stands in for the Queen of the Night, the Ancients for Sarastro and his priests, and so on.

But the composer's first inspiration for the work was visual: Tippett recalled imagining "a wooded hill-top with a temple, where a warm and soft young man was being rebuffed by a cold and hard young woman to such a degree that the collective, magical archetypes take charge – Jung's anima and animus."

The character Sosostris is named after "Madame Sosostris, the famous clairvoyante," in T. S. Eliot's poem "The Waste Land", and King Fisher's name is inspired by the Fisher King character mentioned in the same poem. Tippett was first given the idea of attempting a verse drama by reading Eliot's plays, and he corresponded with Eliot with a view to collaboration, tackling the libretto himself when Eliot declined.

== Performance history ==
The Royal Opera House has mounted three productions of The Midsummer Marriage, in 1955, 1968 and 1996. The 1996 production was revived in 2005, to mark the centenary of Tippett's birth. Barbara Hepworth effected the costumes and stage designs for the lavish original (1955) production. Choreography was by John Cranko.

In 1976 Welsh National Opera staged a production designed by Annena Stubbs, which toured in cities including Leeds. The cast included Felicity Lott as Jenifer and Helen Watts, who had played the role in London in 1968, and recorded it in 1970, as Sosostris. David Cairns wrote that this production showed the opera "responds very readily to simple, imaginative staging, and that there were never any serious problems [with it] except in our attitude".

Other British productions have been staged by English National Opera and Opera North, both in 1985, and Scottish Opera in 1988.

A production was filmed for television in 1984, directed by Elijah Moshinsky, later released on VHS, with David Atherton conducting the London Sinfonietta and Philip Langridge and Lucy Shelton in the lead roles.

Abroad, the opera has received at least five productions. The German premiere was on 29 September 1973, at the Badisches Staatstheater Karlsruhe with Lieselotte Rebmann as Jennifer. Another German production was at the Bayerische Staatsoper in 1998. Other productions have been at Stockholm in 1982, San Francisco in 1983, New York City Opera in 1993 and the Lyric Opera of Chicago in 2005.

Concert performances have been given at the 1977 London Proms, which was given by the forces gathered for WNO's 1976 production, and in Boston in 2012. Andrew Davis's concert performance at the BBC Proms in 2013 was rebroadcast on BBC Radio Three 23 July 2020.

== Roles ==
Roles, voice types, premiere cast
Role	Voice type	Premiere cast, 27 January 1955 Conductor: John Pritchard	First studio recording (1970) Conductor: Sir Colin Davis	Welsh National Opera (1976) Conductor: Richard Armstrong
Mark, a young man of unknown parentage	tenor	Richard Lewis	Alberto Remedios	John Treleaven
Jenifer, his betrothed	soprano	Joan Sutherland	Joan Carlyle	Jill Gomez
King Fisher, Jenifer's father, a businessman	baritone	Otakar Kraus	Raimund Herincx	Raimund Herincx
Bella, King Fisher's secretary	soprano	Adele Leigh	Elizabeth Harwood	Mary Davies
Jack, Bella's boyfriend, a mechanic	tenor	John Lanigan	Stuart Burrows	Arthur Davies
Sosostris, a clairvoyante	contralto	Oralia Domínguez	Helen Watts	Helen Watts
The She-Ancient, priestess of the temple	mezzo-soprano	Edith Coates	Elizabeth Bainbridge	Maureen Guy
The He-Ancient, priest of the temple	bass	Michael Langdon	Stafford Dean	Paul Hudson
Strephon, a dancer	silent	Pirmin Trecu		Hugh Spight
A voice	contralto	Monica Sinclair		
Dancing man	tenor	Andrew Daniels	Andrew Daniels	John Harris
Drunken man	bass	Gordon Farrell	David Whelan	Gareth Rhys-Davies
An Ancient	bass	Frederick Dalberg		
Mark and Jennifer's friends, dancers attendant on the Ancients

== Scoring ==
2 flutes (both doubling on piccolos), 2 oboes, 2 clarinets, 2 Bassoons, 4 French horns, 2 trumpets, 3 trombones, timpani and two percussionists playing: snare drum, bass drum, cymbals, triangle, gong, tubular bells, harp, celesta and strings.

== Synopsis ==
The opera is set in a forest clearing, with a group of buildings to one side. The buildings resemble a sanctuary, with a Greek temple in the middle. A set of spiral stairs leads off to the right and breaks off in midair. To the left, they lead down into the hillside. The costumes are contemporary, aside from the dancers and the Ancients.

=== Act 1 (Morning) ===
A group of young people enters the clearing, surprised by the strange buildings. They hide as Strephon leads the dancers and the Ancients out of the temple. Mark emerges and asks for a new dance in honor of his wedding day. The Ancients warn him of the dangers of thwarting tradition. To demonstrate the point, the He-Ancient trips Strephon as he dances. His bride Jenifer arrives, but she is distant, having run away from her father, King Fisher. She ascends the stone staircase and disappears.

King Fisher arrives, and Mark enters the cavern. King Fisher thinks Jenifer is with Mark, and he summons Jack to break down the gates after the Ancients refuse to let him inside. During the argument, a radiant Jenifer reappears. Mark returns as well, glowing blood red. Representing "starry heaven" and "fruitful earth", the two confront each other. Jenifer says her soul is free of earthly suffering, while Mark claims to have gained new appreciation for the miracle of mortality. Jenifer tries to show Mark his error in a mirror, but Mark causes the mirror to fall and shatter. The couple reverse their paths, and Jenifer descends into the hillside while Mark ascends the stairs and disappears.

=== Act 2 (Afternoon) ===
In the clearing, Jack and Bella meet and decide to marry. They walk into the woods, and Strephon emerges with his dancers to perform three rituals. In the first, a hound chases a hare, but the hare escapes. In the second, an otter chases a fish, who hurts himself on the root of a tree. In the third, a bird with a broken wing is captured by a hawk. Bella is terrified by the rituals. Jack comforts her as she recomposes herself. Reassured, they resume their playful interlude and run off into the woods.

=== Act 3 (Evening and Night) ===
King Fisher orders the group of young people to fetch Madame Sosostris, his clairvoyant. He is determined to thwart the Ancients, convinced that they are responsible for Jenifer's disappearance. The group returns with Sosostris, and King Fisher orders her to reveal Jenifer's location. She warns him against such inquiries into the dream world, but she reveals Jenifer to be lying in a meadow consorting with a winged lion who has the arms and face of a man. Enraged, King Fisher insists Sosostris is lying to him, and he attempts to unveil her.

As he peels away her veils, they begin to glow. When he has stripped all the veils away, he finds an incandescent bud, which blossoms to reveal Mark and Jenifer. King Fisher aims his pistol at Mark, but the couple break from their meditative state to confront King Fisher, causing his heart to fail. The crowd carries his body into the temple. Strephon emerges from the temple with his dancers to perform a fourth ritual, which celebrates carnal love by transforming it into the fire of divine love. The ritual concludes as the bud closes around Mark and Jenifer and bursts into flames.

When the fire subsides, Mark, Jenifer and the Ancients are gone. As the moonlight fades, Mark and Jenifer enter the clearing from opposite sides, dressed for their wedding. They head off down the hill with the crowd as the sun rises. The dawn reveals that the buildings were never more than ruins.

== Recording ==
- Gala GL100.524 (1997): Richard Lewis; Joan Sutherland; Adele Leigh; Edith Coates; John Lanigan; Monica Sinclair; Otakar Kraus; Covent Garden Chorus and Orchestra; John Pritchard, conductor. Live recording of the 1955 premiere.
- Philips 6703.027 (1971, 3-LP set, recorded Wembley Town Hall, July 1970). Reissued on CD by Lyrita: SRCD.2217, 1995: Alberto Remedios; Joan Carlyle; Raimund Herincx; Elizabeth Harwood; Stuart Burrows; Helen Watts; Covent Garden Chorus and Orchestra; Colin Davis, conductor
- LPO LPO0124 (2022): Robert Murray (Mark), Rachel Nicholls (Jenifer), Ashley Riches (King Fisher), Jennifer France (Bella), Toby Spence (Jack), Claire Barnett-Jones (Sosostris), Susan Bickley (She-Ancient), Joshua Bloom (He-Ancient), London Philharmonic Choir, English National Opera Chorus, London Philharmonic Orchestra, Edward Gardner. Recorded live at the Royal Festival Hall on 25 September 2021.
