= August Everding =

German opera director and administrator

August Everding (German pronunciation: [ˈaʊɡʊst ˈʔeːvɐdɪŋ]; 31 October 1928; Bottrop, Germany – 26 January 1999; Munich) was a German opera director and administrator.

He studied at the Universities of Bonn and Munich, where launching his career in the 1950s. He was a member of the Roman Catholic fraternity Katholischer Studentenverein Arminia Bonn. From 1968 onwards he worked as a director in Hamburg, before moving back to Munich in 1977 to become the General Intendant of the Bayerische Staatsoper. In the following years he also directed in Bayreuth, the Deutsche Oper Berlin, Zurich Opera,

In 1988 the Prinzregententheater was renovated under his patronage and could be reopened as theatre and opera house. It also houses the Bavarian Theatre Academy.

His productions were seen in all the major international houses: Vienna State Opera, Salzburg Festival. the Royal Opera House, Covent Garden, London, La Scala, Milan, the Lyric Opera of Chicago, the Metropolitan Opera New York City, San Francisco Opera, Victoria State Opera, and Opera Australia.

In the 1980s and 1990s he interviewed a great many famous opera singers on German television, including Hans Hotter, Carlo Bergonzi, Otto Edelmann, Anja Silja, Astrid Varnay, Ingeborg Hallstein, Gundula Janowitz, Karl Ridderbusch, Birgit Nilsson, Irmgard Seefried, Martha Mödl, Gustav Neidlinger, Hans Hopf, Hans Sotin, Franz Crass, Josef Greindl, and Kurt Moll. Many of these interviews can now be viewed on YouTube, in German.

== Recordings ==
Many of his classic productions are preserved on DVD, including Hänsel und Gretel (1981) (Deutsche Grammophon B000AXSKB8), and Die Zauberflöte (Deutsche Grammophon B000ASAEQW). He was one of the founder members of a society of the revolutionary thoughts on theaters and individual thinking and this was reflected in his works.

- Lohengrin – Richard Wagner sung in English; Lohengrin – Alberto Remedios, Elsa – Karen Bureau, Ortrud – Nance Grant, Telramund – Geoffrey Chard, King Henry – Noel Mangin, Herald – David Brennan; Melbourne Symphony Orchestra, conductor Richard Divall, director August Everding, designer, Kenneth Rowell. Australian Radio Broadcast November 1985. CD91241

== Television director ==
- Amphitryon (1961) – based on Heinrich von Kleist's version of Molière's Amphitryon
- Alle Macht der Erde (1962) – based on a radio play by Leopold Ahlsen
- Alle meine Söhne (1965) – based on All My Sons by Arthur Miller
- Der Kardinal von Spanien (1965) – based on a play by Henry de Montherlant
- Der Nachfolger (1965) – based on a play by Reinhard Raffalt
- Der schwarze Freitag (1966) – film about the Wall Street crash of 1929
- Das Attentat: L. D. Trotzki – Tod im Exil (1967)
- Der Prozeß gegen die neun von Catonsville (1972) – based on a play by Daniel Berrigan
- The Caretaker (1973) – based on The Caretaker by Harold Pinter
- Als wär's ein Stück von mir (1976) – based on Carl Zuckmayer's autobiography
- Hänsel und Gretel (1981) – based on the opera Hansel and Gretel
- Incident at Twilight (1988) – based on a radio play by Friedrich Dürrenmatt
- Effis Nacht (1998) – based on a play by Rolf Hochhuth
