= Monica Sinclair =

British operatic contralto (1925–2002)

Monica Sinclair (23 March 1925 – 7 May 2002) was a British operatic contralto, who sang many roles with the Royal Opera, Covent Garden during the 1950s and 1960s, and appeared on stage and in recordings with Dame Joan Sutherland, Luciano Pavarotti, Maria Callas, Sir Thomas Beecham, Sir Malcolm Sargent and many others. She had a great gift for comedy, and sang in recordings of many of the Gilbert and Sullivan operettas, as well as in recordings from the standard operatic repertory.

== Biography ==
Monica Sinclair was born on 23 March 1925, in Evercreech, Somerset. Her music studies were at the Royal Academy of Music. She made her debut with the Carl Rosa Opera Company in 1948, singing Suzuki in Puccini's Madama Butterfly. Her Covent Garden debut came in 1949, as the Second boy in Mozart's The Magic Flute. Her early Covent Garden roles included Maddalena (Rigoletto), Mrs Sedley (Peter Grimes), Feodor (Boris Godunov), Rosette (Manon), Flosshilde (Das Rheingold), Siegrune (Die Walküre), Azucena (Il trovatore), Pauline (The Queen of Spades), Mercedes (Carmen) and the Voice of Antonia's Mother (The Tales of Hoffmann). She can be heard as the voice of Nicklaus in the 1951 Powell and Pressburger film The Tales of Hoffmann.

She made her Glyndebourne debut in 1954 in the comic role of Ragonde in the first British performance of Rossini's Le comte Ory. There she also sang Berta (The Barber of Seville), Marcellina (The Marriage of Figaro), Dryade (Ariadne auf Naxos), and Queen Henrietta (I puritani, with Dame Joan Sutherland). In 1965, she appeared in a television version of The Rise and Fall of the City of Mahagonny on BBC2 as Mrs Begbick.

Returning to Covent Garden in 1959/60, Sinclair added some new roles to her repertoire – Annina (Der Rosenkavalier, in Georg Solti's Covent Garden début, with Dame Elisabeth Schwarzkopf and Sena Jurinac), Bradamante (Alcina, directed and designed by Franco Zeffirelli, with Dame Joan Sutherland in the title role), Theodosia (Die schweigsame Frau), the Old Prioress (Dialogues des Carmélites), Marfa (Khovanshchina), Emilia (Otello) and the Marquise de Birkenfeld (La fille du régiment, with Sutherland and Luciano Pavarotti). She also sang the Marquise at the Metropolitan Opera, New York.

Her other international appearances included the title role in Lully's Armide at Bordeaux in 1955.

== Premieres ==
Monica Sinclair created a number of roles (at Covent Garden unless indicated):

- 1951: Heavenly Body in Ralph Vaughan Williams' The Pilgrim's Progress
- 1952: Margret in the British stage premiere of Alban Berg's Wozzeck (under Erich Kleiber, who had conducted the world premiere in Berlin)
- 1953: Countess of Essex in the first performance of Benjamin Britten's Gloriana
- 1954: Evadne in Sir William Walton's Troilus and Cressida
- 1954: Ragonde in the first British performance of Gioachino Rossini's Le comte Ory (at Glyndebourne; a performance that was recorded and issued)
- 1955: a Voice in Sir Michael Tippett's The Midsummer Marriage (she later also sang Sosostris in that opera)
- on 11 April 1959 she appeared in a premiere BBC broadcast of Sir Eugene Goossens' opera Don Juan de Manara, along with Marie Collier, Helen Watts, Bruce Boyce and others
- 1967: she created Madame Popova in the premiere of Sir William Walton's one-act opera The Bear (Aldeburgh Festival).

== Recordings ==
Among Monica Sinclair's recordings are:

- Beethoven, Mass in C major
- Bononcini: Griselda (with Lauris Elms, Joan Sutherland, Margreta Elkins, Spiro Malas, Ambrosian Opera Chorus, London Philharmonic Orchestra, under Richard Bonynge)
- Brahms: Alto Rhapsody (under Sir Adrian Boult)
- Delius: A Mass of Life (with Rosina Raisbeck, Charles Craig and Bruce Boyce, under Sir Thomas Beecham)
- Donizetti: La fille du régiment (with Spiro Malas, Luciano Pavarotti, Dame Joan Sutherland, conducted by Bonynge)
- Gay: The Beggar's Opera (1955; cast, Pro Arte Orchestra and Chorus, under Sir Malcolm Sargent)
- German: Merrie England
- Gilbert and Sullivan: H.M.S. Pinafore, Iolanthe, The Mikado, Patience, The Pirates of Penzance, Ruddigore, The Yeomen of the Guard (all with the Pro Arte Orchestra under Sir Malcolm Sargent)
- Gounod: Faust (with Sutherland)
- Handel: Messiah (with Jon Vickers, Giorgio Tozzi, Jennifer Vyvyan, under Beecham)
- Handel: Alcina
- Handel: Israel in Egypt
- Mozart: The Marriage of Figaro (Graziella Sciutti, Glyndebourne Festival Orchestra, under Vittorio Gui)
- Mozart: Requiem (with Elsie Morison, Alexander Young, Marian Nowakowski, BBC Chorus, Royal Philharmonic Orchestra, under Beecham)
- Purcell: Dido and Aeneas (as the Sorceress in the 1961 version, with Dame Janet Baker as Dido)
- Rossini: Le comte Ory (British premiere performance at Glyndebourne)
- Johann Strauss II: Der Zigeunerbaron
- Stravinsky: Mavra (with Helen Watts, Kenneth MacDonald, Joan Carlyle, Orchestre de la Suisse Romande under Ernest Ansermet)
- Tippett: The Midsummer Marriage (with Adele Leigh, Otakar Kraus, Dame Joan Sutherland, John Lanigan, under John Pritchard)
- Wagner: Die Walküre (under Sir Edward Downes)
- Walton: Troilus and Cressida (with Richard Lewis, Elisabeth Schwarzkopf, Marie Collier, under the composer).

== Private life and death ==
Monica Sinclair was married to Anthony Tunstall, a former Covent Garden horn player, with whom she had six children. The union was dissolved, however.

She died in 2002, aged 77.
