= Lucrezia Borgia (opera) =

1833 opera by Gaetano Donizetti

- Opera by Gaetano Donizetti
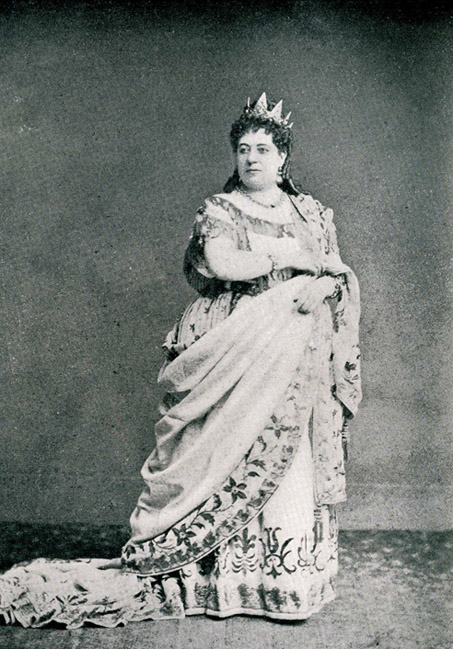
- Thérèse Tietjens in the title role
- Librettist: Felice Romani
- Language: Italian
- Based on: Lucrezia Borgia by Victor Hugo
- Premiere: 26 December 1833; La Scala, Milan

Lucrezia Borgia is a melodramatic opera in a prologue and two acts by Gaetano Donizetti. Felice Romani wrote the Italian libretto after the play Lucrezia Borgia by Victor Hugo, in its turn after the legend of Lucrezia Borgia. Lucrezia Borgia was first performed on 26 December 1833 at La Scala, Milan.

== Performance history ==
=== 19th century ===
Because of its scandalous subject matter, Lucrezia Borgia was taken up slowly in Italy and presented in many Italian theatres with altered titles and, in some cases, altered character names. It was given in Florence, beginning on 12 November 1838, as Eustorgia da Romano, in Trieste in the autumn of 1838 as Alfonso Duca di Ferrara, in Ferrara on 14 April 1841 as Giovanna I di Napoli, and in Rome on 26 December 1841 as Elisa da Fosco.

The first London production was at Her Majesty's Theatre on 6 June 1839 with Giulia Grisi and Mario. When the opera was staged in Paris (Théâtre des Italiens) in 1840, Victor Hugo obtained an injunction against further productions within the domain of French copyright law. The libretto was then rewritten and retitled La rinnegata, with the Italian characters changed to Turks, and the performances were resumed.

The first English-language production was in London on 30 December 1843. The English tenor Sims Reeves was a noted Gennaro. Lucrezia was first presented in New Orleans on 27 April 1843 and then at New York's American Theatre on 11 May 1843 and later at the Palmo's Opera House in 1847: with Giulia Grisi in 1854; and with Thérèse Tietjens and Brignoli in 1876. It was given at the Academy of Music, Philadelphia, in 1882, and at the Metropolitan Opera House in New York, in 1904, with Enrico Caruso as Gennaro and Arturo Vigna conducting.

=== 20th century and beyond ===
A famous performance of Lucrezia Borgia presented by the American Opera Society Ensemble in 1965 at Carnegie Hall with soprano Montserrat Caballé, who was making her American debut, was soon followed by a recording featuring Caballé, Shirley Verrett, Alfredo Kraus, and Ezio Flagello, conducted by Jonel Perlea, who also led the Carnegie Hall performance.

Lucrezia Borgia is often produced as a vehicle for a star soprano, including Montserrat Caballé, Leyla Gencer, Mariella Devia, Beverly Sills, Dame Joan Sutherland, Renée Fleming, Edita Gruberová and Sondra Radvanovsky.

== Roles ==
Roles, voice types, premiere cast
Role	Voice type	Premiere cast, 26 December 1833 Conductor: Eugenio Cavallini
Alfonso d'Este, Duke of Ferrara	bass	Luciano Mariani
Lucrezia Borgia	soprano	Henriette Méric-Lalande
Maffio Orsini	contralto	Marietta Brambilla
Gennaro, young nobleman in service of the Venetian Republic	tenor	Francesco Pedrazzi
Jeppo Liverotto, young nobleman in service of the Venetian Republic	tenor	Napoleone Marconi
Don Apostolo Gazella, young nobleman in service of the Venetian Republic	bass	Giuseppe Visanetti
Ascanio Petrucci, young nobleman in service of the Venetian Republic	baritone	Ismaele Guaita
Oloferno Vitellozzo, young nobleman in service of the Venetian Republic	tenor	Giuseppe Vaschetti
Rustighello, in the service of Don Alfonso	tenor	Ranieri Pochini
Gubetta, in service of Lucrezia	bass	Domenico Spiaggi
Astolfo, in service of Lucrezia	tenor	Francesco Petrazzoli
Gentlemen-at-arms, officers, and nobles of the Venetian Republic; same, attached to court of Alfonso; ladies-in-waiting, Capuchin friars, etc.

== Synopsis ==
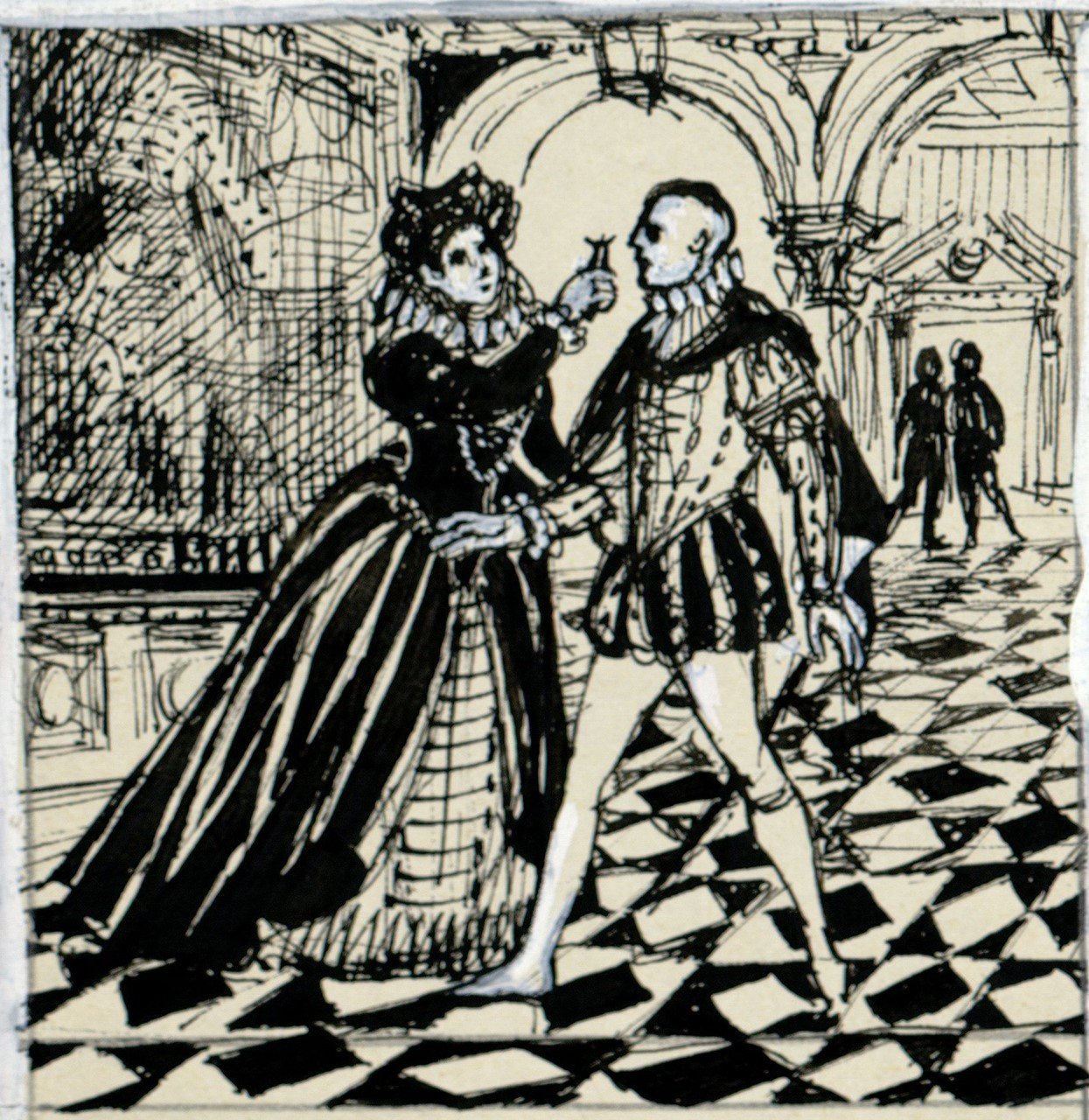
Disegno per copertina di libretto, drawing for Lucrezia Borgia (undated)

Time: Early 16th century
Place: Venice and Ferrara

=== Prologue ===
==== Scene 1 ====
The Palazzo Grimani in Venice

Gennaro and his friends, including Orsini, celebrate on the brightly lit terrace, in front of which lies the Giudecca Canal ("Bella Venezia!"). The friends' conversation turns to Don Alfonso, Duke of Ferrara, to whose house they will be travelling the next day, and to his wife, the infamous Lucrezia Borgia. On hearing Lucrezia's name, Orsini tells of how Gennaro and he, alone in a forest, were warned by a mysterious old man to beware her and the entire Borgia family, and that the two of them would die together ("Nella fatal di Rimini"). Professing his boredom with Orsini's tale Gennaro wanders off and falls asleep nearby. His friends are invited to rejoin the festivities, and he is left behind ("Senti! La danza invitaci").

==== Scenes 2 and 3 ====
A gondola appears, and from it a masked woman exits onto the terrace ("Tranquillo ei posa..."). She observes the sleeping Gennaro with affection and hurries over to him ("Com'è bello! Quale incanto in quel volto onesto e altero!"). When she kisses Gennaro's hand, he wakes and is instantly struck by her beauty ("Leggiadra e amabil siete"). He expresses his love for her, but admits that the one person nearer to him is his mother that he has never met. He sings of his childhood as an orphan brought up by a common fisherman father ("Di pescatore ignobile esser figliuol credei"). The woman, sympathetic to his plight, weeps for him ("Ama tua madre, e tenero sempre per lei ti serba...").

The others return ("Gente appressa... io ti lascio") and seem to recognise her, listing in turn the members of their families she has killed, to Gennaro's horror and disbelief ("Maffio Orsini, signora, son'io"). Gennaro is then finally told that the woman is Lucrezia Borgia.

=== Act 1 ===
"Vieni: la mia vendetta è meditata e pronta"
Performed in 1912 by Feodor Chaliapin (1873–1938)

Ferrara

The Duke, believing Gennaro to be Lucrezia's lover, plots his murder with his servant Rustighello ("Vieni: la mia vendetta è meditata e pronta"). Gennaro and his companions leave the house for a party and pass the Duke's palace with its large gilded coat of arms reading Borgia. Keen to show his contempt for the Borgia family, Gennaro removes the initial "B", leaving the obscene "Orgia" (orgy).

In the palace, Lucrezia is shown into the Duke's chamber. Having seen the defaced crest, she demands death for the perpetrator, not knowing that it is Gennaro. The Duke orders Gennaro to be brought before her and accuses him of staining the noble name of Borgia, a crime to which he readily confesses. Lucrezia, horrified, attempts to excuse the insult as a youthful prank, but Don Alfonso accuses Lucrezia of infidelity, having observed her meeting with Gennaro in Venice. In a scene full of drama and tension, she denies any impropriety, but he demands the prisoner's death and forces her to choose the manner of Gennaro's execution. Pretending to pardon him, the Duke offers Gennaro a poisoned glass of wine, which he proceeds to drink. After a stunning trio ("Guai se ti sfugge un moto, se ti tradisce un detto!") the Duke leaves and Lucrezia hurries to Gennaro, giving him an antidote to the poison the Duke has mixed with the wine. He drinks, and in a last duet, she implores him to flee the city and her husband ("Bevi e fuggi... te'n prego, o Gennaro!").

=== Act 2 ===
Orsini's "Brindisi"
Ernestine Schumann-Heink

The palace of the Princess Negroni

Ignoring Lucrezia's advice, Gennaro attends a party at the palace, swearing never to be parted from his friend Orsini. Orsini leads the party in a brindisi or drinking song ("Il segreto per esser felici") and they drink. Lucrezia enters and announces that in revenge for their insults in Venice she has poisoned their wine and arranged five coffins for their bodies. She has hitherto believed that Gennaro fled Ferrara on her advice, and is thus dismayed when he steps forward and announces that she has poisoned a sixth. Orsini, Liverotto, Vitellozzo, Petrucci and Gazella fall dead. Gennaro seizes a dagger and attempts to kill Lucrezia, but she stops him by revealing that he is in fact her son. Once again she asks him to drink the antidote, but this time he refuses, choosing to die with his friends. In a final cabaletta ("Era desso il figlio mio"), Lucrezia mourns her son and expires.

== Music ==
The closing cabaletta "Era desso il figlio mio" was added by Donizetti upon insistence by renowned soprano Henriette Méric-Lalande, who created the role of Lucrezia Borgia. It is one of the most demanding arias in all the operatic repertoire, with trills and coloratura passages that demand extreme vocal agility. Donizetti later removed the aria because he believed it damaged the credibility of the ending.

== Recordings ==
Year	Cast (Lucrezia, Genaro, Maffio Orsini, Don Alfonso)	Conductor, Opera house and orchestra	Label
1965	Montserrat Caballé, Alain Vanzo, Jane Berbié, Kostas Paskalis	Jonel Perlea, American Opera Society orchestra and chorus (Recording of a concert performance at Carnegie Hall, 20 April)	CD: Opera D'Oro; Cat: 1030815
1966	Leyla Gencer, Giacomo Aragall, Anna Maria Rota, Mario Petri	Carlo Franci, Teatro San Carlo di Napoli orchestra and chorus (Recording of a performance at Teatro San Carlo, Naples, 29 January 1966)	CD: Hunt Productions; Cat: HUNTCD 544
1966	Montserrat Caballé, Alfredo Kraus, Shirley Verrett, Ezio Flagello	Jonel Perlea, RCA Italiana Opera Chorus and Orchestra	CD: RCA; Cat: RCAG 66422RG
1974	Leyla Gencer, José Carreras, Tatiana Troyanos, Matteo Manuguerra	Nicola Rescigno, Dallas Civic Opera (Live)	CD: Melodram; Cat: 270109
1975	Joan Sutherland, John Brecknock, Huguette Tourangeau, Michael Devlin	Richard Bonynge, Houston Symphony Orchestra and chorus (Live)	LP: MRF Records; Cat:MRF-121-S
1976	Beverly Sills, Henry Price, Susanne Marsee, Adib Fazah	Julius Rudel, New York City Opera (Live)	CD: Opera Depot; Cat: 11295-2
1977	Joan Sutherland, Margreta Elkins, Robert Allman, Ron Stevens	Richard Bonynge, Sydney Elizabethan Orchestra and Chorus of Australian Opera (Live)	DVD: Opus Arte "Faveo", Cat: OAF 4026D
1978	Joan Sutherland, Giacomo Aragall, Marilyn Horne, Ingvar Wixell	Richard Bonynge, National Philharmonic Orchestra and London Opera Chorus	CD: Decca; Cat: 421497
1979	Leyla Gencer, Alfredo Kraus, Elena Zilio, Bonaldo Giaiotti	Gabriele Ferro, Teatro Comunale di Firenze orchestra and chorus (Live)	CD: Living Stage; Cat: LS1096
1980	Joan Sutherland, Alfredo Kraus, Anne Howells, Stafford Dean	Richard Bonynge, Royal Opera House, Covent Garden orchestra and chorus (Live)	DVD: Covent Garden Pioneer; Cat: B 12385-01
1989	Joan Sutherland, Alfredo Kraus, Martine Dupuy, Michele Pertusi	Richard Bonynge, Gran Teatro del Liceo orchestra and chorus (Video recording of a performance in the Gran Teatro del Liceo, 31 May)	VHS Video Cassette: Lyric Distribution, Cat: 1842 (incomplete) & 1882 (1990)
2007	Dimitra Theodossiou, Roberto De Biasio, Nidia Palacios, Enrico Giuseppe Iori	Tiziano Severini, Orchestra and Chorus of Bergamo Musica Festival G. Donizetti (Live)	DVD: Naxos; Cat: 2.110264
2009	Edita Gruberová, Pavol Breslik, Alice Coote, Franco Vassallo	Bertrand de Billy; Bayerisches Staatsoper (Recording of a performance in the Nationaltheater, Munich, February)	DVD Medici Arts, Cat: 2072458-1
2010	Edita Gruberová, José Bros, Silvia Tro Santafé, Franco Vassallo	Andriy Yurkevych; WDR Rundfunkorchester Köln (Recording of a performance in the Philarmonie Köln, 4 June)	CD: Nightingale Classics AG. Cat: NC 000100-2
2010	Mariella Devia, Giuseppe Filianoti, Mariana Pizzolato, Alex Esposito	Marco Guidarini; Orchestra Filarmonica Marchigiana (Recording of a performance in Teatro delle Muse di Ancona, February	CD: Bongiovanni; Cat: GB 2560/62
2013	Renée Fleming, Michael Fabiano, Elizabeth DeShong, Vitalij Kowaljow	Riccardo Frizza, San Francisco Opera orchestra and chorus	DVD:EuroArts; Cat:2059644
