= Robert Allman =

Australian operatic singer

Robert Allman OBE AM
- Born: Robert Edward Joseph Allman; 8 June 1927; Melbourne, Australia
- Died: 4 December 2013 (aged 86)
- Occupation: Operatic Bass-Baritone
- Honors: Order of the British Empire; Order of Australia

Robert Edward Joseph Allman AM OBE (8 June 1927 – 4 December 2013) was an Australian operatic bass-baritone.

== Biography ==
Robert Allman was born in Melbourne in 1927. He studied in Paris and sang at the Royal Opera, Covent Garden for three seasons from 1955. He then moved to Germany, where he sang in over a dozen opera houses. He also sang in opera houses including Zurich, New Orleans, Singapore and Vienna.

In 1965, he sang with the Sutherland-Williamson Opera Company on its tour of Australia, alongside Joan Sutherland herself, Luciano Pavarotti, Lauris Elms, Margreta Elkins and others.

He then became a Principal Artist with Opera Australia, where he remained for the rest of his career. He sang in eleven roles alongside Sutherland. His repertoire included the core bass-baritone roles of Rigoletto, Gianni Schicchi, Macbeth, The Flying Dutchman and Simon Boccanegra. He also sang as Don Fernando and Pizarro in Fidelio, Rangoni in Boris Godunov, Valentin in Faust, Wolfram in Tannhäuser, Donner in Das Rheingold, Telramund in Lohengrin, Kothner in Die Meistersinger von Nürnberg, the four villain roles in The Tales of Hoffmann, Anckarstroem in Un ballo in maschera, Amonasro in Aida, Iago in Otello, Germont in La traviata, Sharpless in Madama Butterfly, Tonio in Pagliacci, Marcello in La bohème and Scarpia in Tosca.

== Recordings ==
His recordings include a complete Lucrezia Borgia (Donizetti), with Sutherland and Elkins, conducted by Richard Bonynge, as well as Fidelio and Die Meistersinger von Nürnberg.

== Honours ==
Allman was appointed an Officer of the Order of the British Empire in the 1980 New Year's Honours, and a Member of the Order of Australia in the Queen's Birthday Honours of 1992.

He was a Patron of the Joan Sutherland Society of Sydney.

His death was announced on 4 December 2013.
