= Stafford Dean =

British bass opera singer (born 1937)

Stafford Dean (born 20 June 1937) is a British bass opera singer.

He was born in Kingswood, Surrey. Dean studied under Howell Glynne.

Of particular note was his performance as Pooh-Bah in the BBC production of Mikado, and his outstanding rendition of the role of Alfonso d'Este in the 1980 Covent Garden production of Donizetti's opera Lucrezia Borgia.

Dean has a wide international following.
