= Alcina =

1735 opera by George Frideric Handel

- Opera by George Frideric Handel
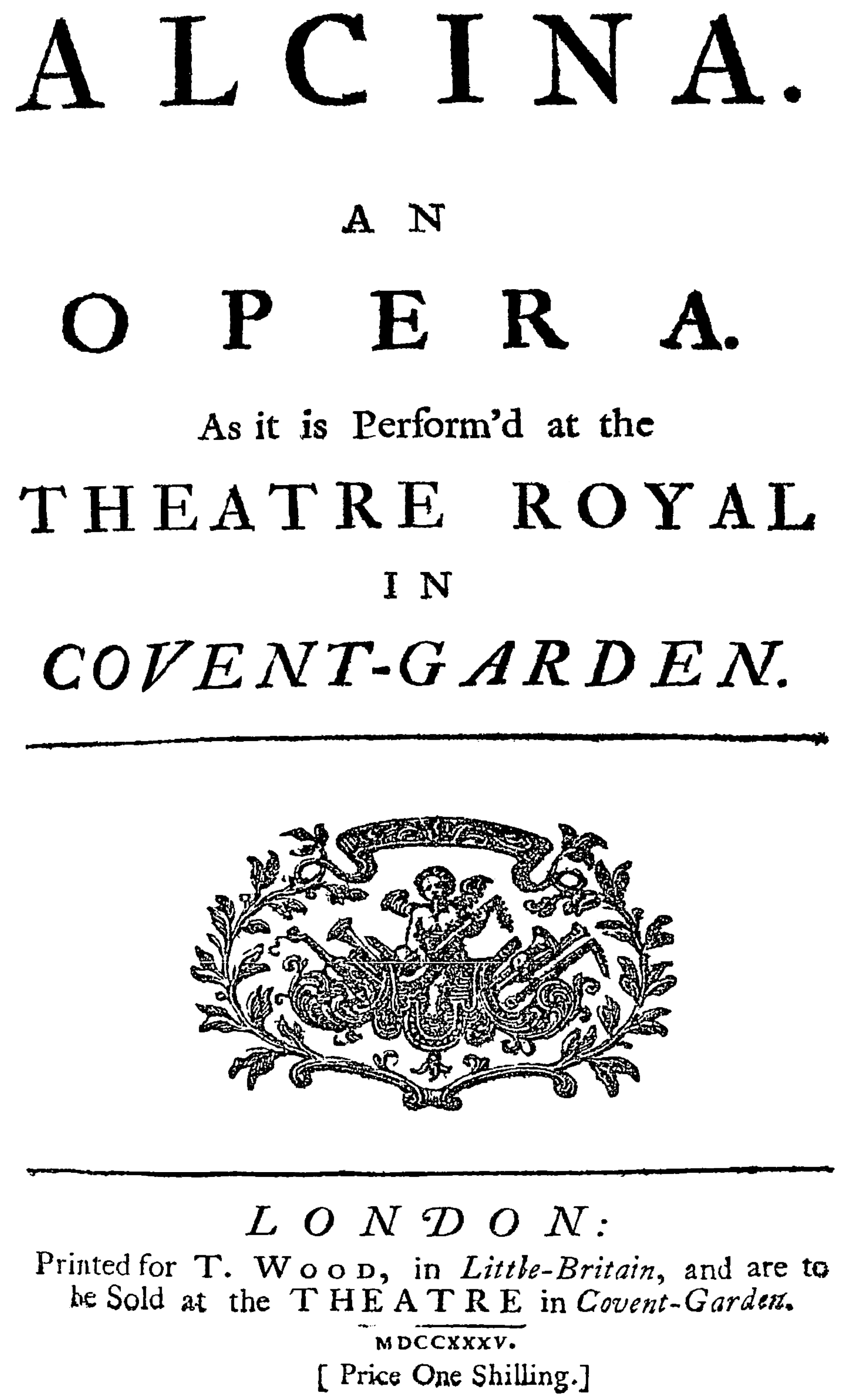
- Title page of the libretto
- Language: Italian
- Based on: Libretto of L'isola di Alcina
- Premiere: 16 April 1735; Theatre Royal, Covent Garden, London

Alcina (HWV 34) is a 1735 opera by George Frideric Handel. He used the libretto of L'isola di Alcina, a work set to music in 1728 in Rome by Riccardo Broschi, which he had acquired a year later during his travels in Italy. Partly altered for better conformity, the story was originally taken from Ludovico Ariosto's epic poem Orlando furioso (like those of Handel's operas Orlando and Ariodante). The opera contains several musical sequences with opportunity for dance: these were composed for dancer Marie Sallé.

== Performance history ==
Handel composed Alcina for his first season at the Theatre Royal, Covent Garden in London. It premiered on 16 April 1735. Like the composer's other works in the opera seria genre, Alcina soon fell into obscurity; after a revival in Brunswick in 1738 it was not performed again until a production in Leipzig in 1928.

The Australian soprano Joan Sutherland sang the role in a production by Franco Zeffirelli (in which she made her debut at La Fenice) in February 1960, and at the Dallas Opera in November of that year. She performed in the same production at the Royal Opera House, Covent Garden, in 1962. Since then Alcina has been performed on many of the world's stages. A major production was the one directed by Robert Carsen and originally staged for the Opéra de Paris in 1999 and repeated at the Lyric Opera of Chicago. Both stagings featured Renée Fleming in the title role.

The opera was given a concert performance on 10 October 2014 at the Barbican Centre in London. Joyce DiDonato sang the title role under Harry Bicket with The English Concert. Alice Coote, Christine Rice and Anna Christy sang other significant roles. The group toured continental Europe, with performances in Pamplona, Madrid, Vienna and Paris and then at Carnegie Hall in New York on 26 October. Alcina received a fully staged production during the 2017 Santa Fe Opera season with Elza van den Heever in the title role. Among many other performances worldwide, the opera was staged by the Salzburg Festival in 2019, with Cecilia Bartoli in the title role.

Alcina received several major new British productions in 2022. Opera North presented its first staging of the opera, directed by Tim Albery and conducted by Laurence Cummings, in February; Glyndebourne followed with its own first production, directed by Francesco Micheli and conducted by Jonathan Cohen, during the 2022 Festival. Later that year, the Royal Opera introduced a new production by Richard Jones, conducted by Christian Curnyn, with Lisette Oropesa as Alcina and Emily D'Angelo as Ruggiero. Jones's production subsequently won an Olivier Award and returned to the Royal Opera House for its first revival in September-October 2026, conducted by David Bates and with Oropesa and D'Angelo again in the principal roles.

== Roles ==
Roles, voice types, and premiere cast
Role	Voice type	Premiere cast, 16 April 1735 Conductor: George Frideric Handel
Alcina, a sorceress	soprano	Anna Maria Strada
Morgana, Alcina's sister	soprano	Cecilia Young
Oberto, a boy searching for his father	boy soprano	William Savage
Ruggiero, a knight	mezzo-soprano castrato	Giovanni Carestini
Bradamante, Ruggiero's betrothed, disguised as her own brother, the knight Ricciardo	contralto	Maria Caterina Negri
Oronte, lover of Morgana	tenor	John Beard
Melisso, Bradamante's Guardian	bass	Gustavus Waltz

== Synopsis ==
=== Prologue ===
The background of the opera comes from the poem Orlando Furioso. The heroic knight Ruggiero is destined to a short but glorious life, and a benevolent magician is always whisking him away from the arms of his fiancée, Bradamante. Bradamante is not the type to put up with the constant disappearance of her lover, and she spends vast portions of the poem in full armor chasing after him. Just before the opera begins she has rescued him from an enchanted castle, only to have her hippogriff (a flying horse-eagle) take a fancy to Ruggiero and fly off with him. Ruggiero and the hippogriff land on an island in the middle of the ocean. As the hippogriff begins to eat the leaves of a myrtle bush, Ruggiero is startled to hear the bush begin to speak. The bush reveals that it was once a living soul named Sir Astolfo, and the island belongs to the sister sorceresses Alcina and Morgana. The beautiful Alcina seduces every knight that lands on her isle, but soon tires of her lovers and changes them into stones, animals, plants or anything that strikes her fancy. Despite Astolfo's warning, Ruggiero strides off to meet this sorceress – and falls under her spell.

=== Act 1 ===
Bradamante, again searching for her lover, arrives on Alcina's island with Ruggiero's former tutor, Melisso. Dressed in armor, Bradamante looks like a young man and goes by the name of her own brother, Ricciardo. She and Melisso possess a magic ring which enables the wearer to see through illusion, which they plan to use to break Alcina's spells and release her captives.

The first person they meet is the sorceress Morgana. Barely human and with no understanding of true love, she immediately abandons her own lover Oronte for the handsome 'Ricciardo.' Morgana conveys the visitors to Alcina's court, where Bradamante is dismayed to discover that Ruggiero is besotted with Alcina and in a state of complete amnesia about his previous life. Alcina instructs Ruggiero to show her guests the places where they fell in love (Di, cor mio). Also at Alcina's court is a boy, Oberto, who is looking for his father, Astolfo, who was last seen heading toward this island. Bradamante guesses that Astolfo is now transformed into something, but she holds her peace and concerns herself with Ruggiero. Bradamante and Melisso rebuke Ruggiero for his desertion, but he can think of nothing but Alcina.

Meanwhile, Oronte discovers that Morgana has fallen in love with 'Ricciardo,' and challenges 'him' to a duel. Morgana stops the fight, but Oronte is in a foul mood and takes it out on Ruggiero. He tells the young man exactly how Alcina treats her former lovers and adds that, as far as he can tell, Alcina has fallen in love with the newcomer, Ricciardo (Semplicetto! A donna credi? Nr. 12). Ruggiero is horrified and overwhelms Alcina with his jealous fury. Things get even worse when 'Ricciardo' enters and pretends to admire Alcina. Alcina calms Ruggiero (Sì, son quella Nr. 13), but Bradamante is so upset at seeing her fiancé wooed before her very eyes that she reveals her true identity to Ruggiero (La bocca vaga, quell'occhio nero Nr. 14). Melisso hastily contradicts her and Ruggiero becomes very confused.

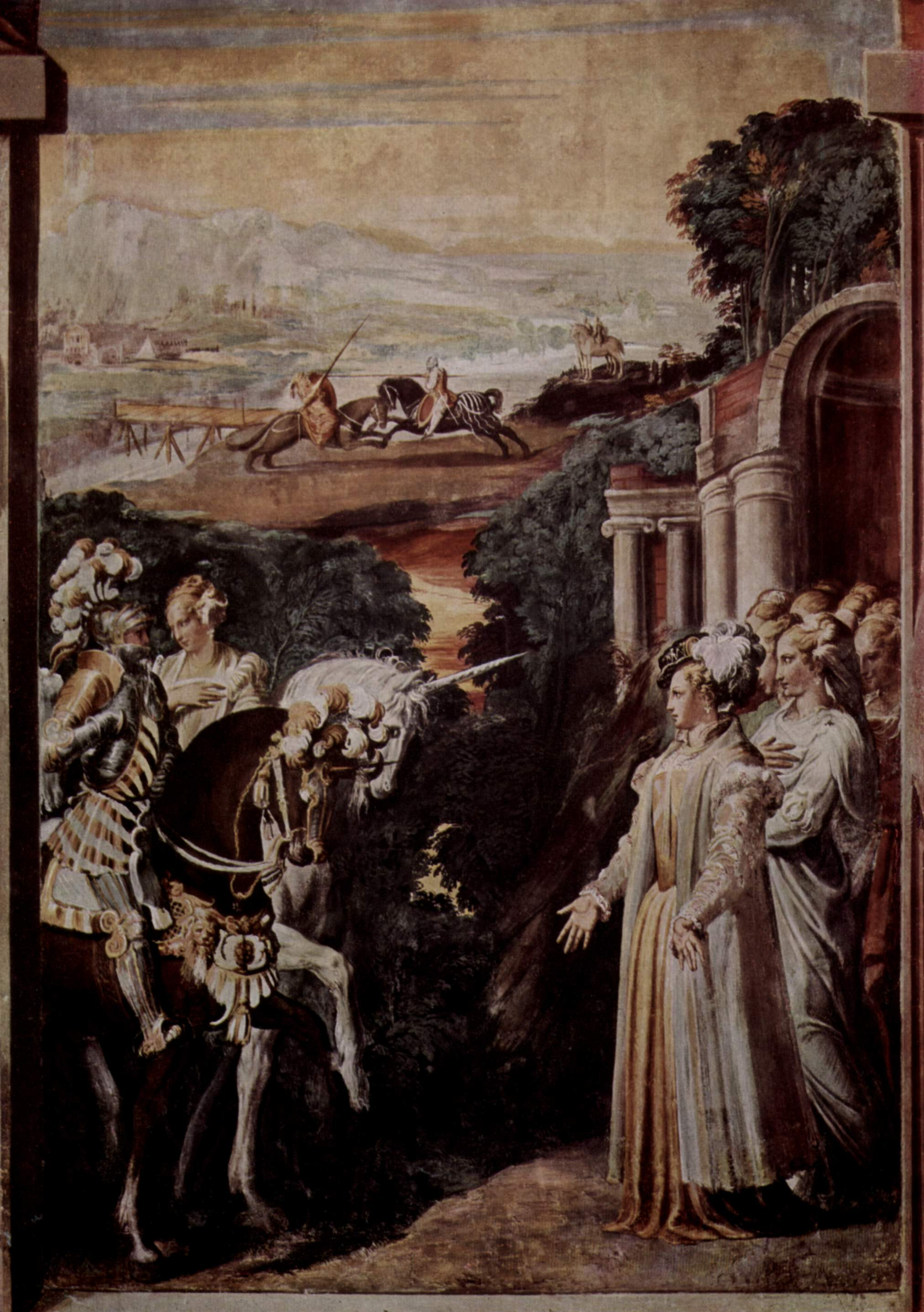
Alcina Meets Ruggiero, Niccolò dell'Abbate, c. 1550

Alcina tells Morgana that she plans to turn Ricciardo into an animal, just to show Ruggiero how much she really loves him. Morgana begs Ricciardo to escape the island and Alcina's clutches, but 'he' says he'd rather stay, as he loves another. Morgana asks if he is referring to her and he says yes, and swears his fidelity to her. The act ends with Morgana's aria Tornami a vagheggiar, in which she tells 'Ricciardo' to come back to court her, and that she will remain faithful to him. (In some productions, this aria is sung by Alcina.)

=== Act 2 ===
Melisso recalls Ruggiero to reason and duty by letting him wear the magic ring: under its influence, Ruggiero sees the island as it really is—a desert, peopled with monsters. Appalled, he realizes he must leave, and sings the famous aria Verdi prati ('Green meadows') where he admits that even though he knows the island and Alcina are mere illusions, their beauty will haunt him for the rest of his life.

Melisso warns Ruggiero that he cannot just leave; Alcina still wields immense power, and he should cover his escape by telling her that he wishes to go hunting. Ruggiero agrees, but, thoroughly bewildered by the magic and illusion surrounding him, he refuses to believe his eyes when he at last sees Bradamante as herself, believing that she may be another of Alcina's illusions. Bradamante is in despair, as is Alcina. Convinced of Ruggiero's indifference, Alcina enters to turn Ricciardo into an animal, and Ruggiero has to pull himself together quickly and convince the sorceress that he does not need any proof of her love. It is at this point that the audience realises that Alcina genuinely loves Ruggiero; from now until the end of the opera, she is depicted sympathetically.

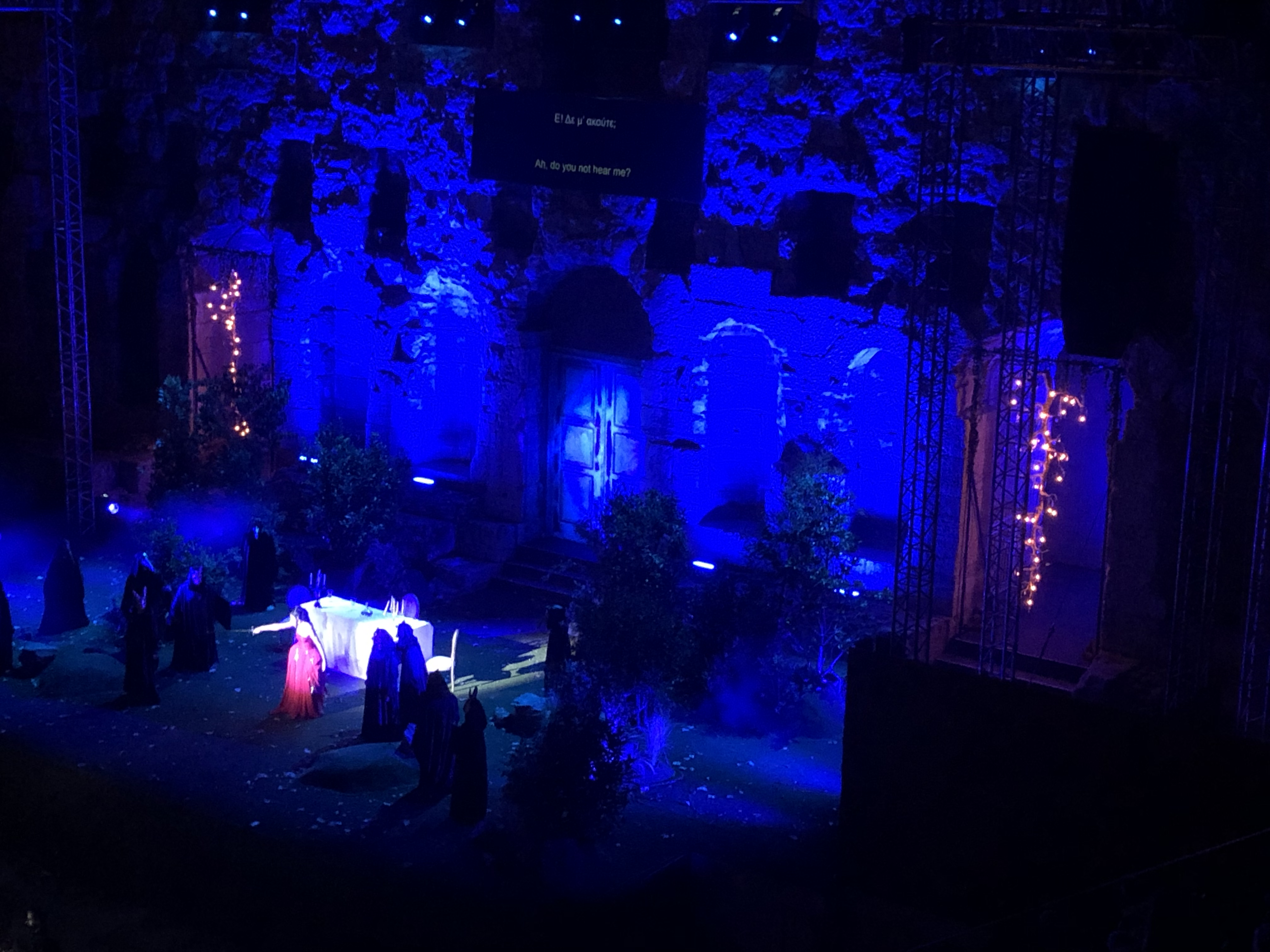
Performance in the ancient Herodeion theatre in Athens on 6 July 2019

Oronte realizes that Ricciardo, Melisso and Ruggiero are in some sort of alliance, and Morgana and Alcina realise they are being deceived. But it is too late: Alcina's powers depend on illusion and, as true love enters her life, her magic powers slip away. As the act ends, Alcina tries to call up evil spirits to stop Ruggiero from leaving her, but her magic fails her.

=== Act 3 ===
The opera finishes swiftly. Morgana and Oronte try to rebuild their relationship; her aria Credete al mio dolore, which has a striking cello obligato, conveys the depth of her pain and regret. He rebuffs her but (once she is offstage) admits he loves her still. Ruggiero returns to his proper heroic status and sings an aria accompanied by high horns (Sta nell'Ircana pietrosa tana); Oberto is introduced to a lion, to whom he feels strangely attached, and Alcina sings a desolate aria in which she longs for oblivion (Mi restano le lagrime).

Bradamante and Ruggiero decide that they need to destroy the source of Alcina's magic, usually represented as an urn. Alcina pleads with them, but Ruggiero is deaf to her appeals and smashes the urn. As he does so, everything is both ruined and restored. Alcina's magic palace crumbles to dust and she and Morgana sink into the ground, but Alcina's lovers are returned to their proper selves. The lion turns into Oberto's father, Astolfo, and other people stumble on. "I was a rock," says one, "I a tree" says another, and "I a wave in the ocean." All the humans sing of their relief and joy, and Alcina is forgotten.

== Audio recordings ==
Alcina discography, audio recordings
Year	Cast: Alcina, Ruggiero, Bradamante, Morgana, Oronte, Melisso, Oberto	Conductor, Orchestra	Label
1959	Joan Sutherland, Fritz Wunderlich, Norma Procter, Jeanette Van Dijck, Nicola Monti, Thomas Hemsley	Ferdinand Leitner, Capella Coloniensis	LP/CD: Deutsche Grammophon
1962	Joan Sutherland, Teresa Berganza, Monica Sinclair, Graziella Sciutti, Luigi Alva, Ezio Flagello, Mirella Freni	Richard Bonynge, London Symphony Orchestra	LP/CD: Decca
1986	Arleen Auger, Della Jones, Kathleen Kuhlmann, Eiddwen Harrhy, Maldwyn Davies, John Tomlinson, Patrizia Kwella	Richard Hickox; City of London Baroque Sinfonia	CD: EMI
1999	Renée Fleming, Susan Graham, Kathleen Kuhlmann, Natalie Dessay, Timothy Robinson, Laurent Naouri, Juanita Lascarro	William Christie; Les Arts Florissants	CD: Erato; Recorded live at the Opéra national de Paris, June 1999
2005	Anja Harteros, Vesselina Kasarova, Sonia Prina, Verónica Cangemi, John Mark Ainsley, Christopher Purves, Deborah York	Ivor Bolton; Bayerisches Staatsorchester	CD: Farao Classics; Recorded live at Münchner Prinzregententheater, July 2005
2009	Joyce DiDonato, Maite Beaumont, Sonia Prina, Karina Gauvin, Kobie van Rensburg, Vito Priante, Laura Cherici	Alan Curtis; Il Complesso Barocco orchestra	CD: Archiv Deutsche Grammophon; Recorded live at Chiesa di Sant'Agostino, Tuscania, Sept 2007
2023	Magdalena Kožená, Anna Bonitatibus, Elizabeth DeShong, Erin Morley, Valerio Contaldo, Alex Rosen, Alois Mühlbacher	Marc Minkowski; Les Musiciens du Louvre	CD: Pentatone; Recorded at the Auditorium de Bordeaux, February 2023

== Video recordings ==
Alcina discography, video recordings
Year	Cast: Alcina, Ruggiero, Bradamante, Morgana, Oronte, Melisso, Oberto	Conductor, Opera house, Orchestra and chorus	Label
1983	Joan Sutherland, Margreta Elkins, Lauris Elms, Narelle Davidson, Richard Greager, John Wegner, Anne-Maree McDonald	Richard Bonynge, Sydney Opera House, Sydney Symphony Orchestra and chorus	DVD: House of Opera; Cat: DVD 8863
1990	Arleen Augér, Della Jones, Kathleen Kuhlmann, Donna Brown, Jorge López Yáñez, Gregory Reinharti, Martina Musacchio	William Christie, Grand Théâtre de Genève, Orchestre de la Suisse Romande, Choeur du Grand Théâtre	DVD: House of Opera; Cat: DVD 206
1999	Catherine Naglestad, Alice Coote, Helene Schneiderman, Catriona Smith, Rolf Romei, Michael Ebbecke, Claudia Mahnke	Alan Hacker, Staatsoper Stuttgart, Staatsorchester Stuttgart	DVD: ArtHaus Musik; Cat: 100338; 100 339
2011	Anja Harteros, Vesselina Kasarova, Kristina Hammarström, Veronica Cangemi, Benjamin Bruns, Adam Plachetka, Alois Mühlbacher	Marc Minkowski, Vienna State Opera, Les Musiciens du Louvre Grenoble, Vienna State Opera Ballet	DVD / Blu-ray: ArtHaus Musik; Cat: 101571; 108028
2015	Sandrine Piau, Maite Beaumont, Angélique Noldus, Sabina Puértolas, Daniel Behle, Giovanni Furlanetto, Chloé Briot	Christophe Rousset, Théâtre Royal de la Monnaie, Les Talens Lyriques, Choeur de Chambre de l'IMEP	Blu-ray: Alpha Classics; Cat: ALPHA-715 (Blu-ray 1: Alcina; Blu-ray 2: Tamerlano)
2015	Patricia Petibon, Philippe Jaroussky, Katarina Bradić, Anna Prohaska, Anthony Gregory, Krzysztof Baczyk, Elias Mädler	Andrea Marcon, Freiburger Barockorchester, MusicAeterna choir	DVD / Blu-ray: Erato Records; Cat: 9029597436; 9029597435 Broadcaster: Arte Channel; Directed by Katie Mitchell at Festival d'Aix-en-Provence, July 2015
