= Joan Carlyle =

Welsh operatic soprano (1931–2021)

Joan Carlyle (6 April 1931 – 31 October 2021) was a Welsh operatic soprano. She was born in Upton on the Wirral, Cheshire. After auditioning for the Royal Opera House, Covent Garden, London, she was put under contract by the musical director Rafael Kubelík and made her debut in 1955, appearing also under him in The Magic Flute in 1956 and as Ascagne in Les Troyens.

She became one of the principal English-speaking singers who emerged at Covent Garden in the 1950s becoming an established member of the Covent Garden Opera Company. The conductor Rudolf Kempe was a powerful influence and nurtured her career. It was with him that she had her first successes in the 1958–59 season as Sophie in Luchino Visconti's production of Der Rosenkavalier, and then as Micaela in Carmen.

Under a series of distinguished conductors, Carlyle sang throughout Europe and beyond, making her US debut in March 1963 in the Brahms's A German Requiem with Erich Leinsdorf.

== Covent Garden years ==
Carlyle emerged in the 1950s along with other singers who also became established members of the Covent Garden company such as sopranos Amy Shuard, Joan Sutherland, Elsie Morison, Marie Collier, and Josephine Veasey; tenors Jon Vickers and Peter Pears; and basses Michael Langdon and Geraint Evans, but it was with Jon Vickers that she was often paired.

In 1959 she sang the role of Glauce in Cherubini's Medea with Maria Callas in the title role. Many major roles followed at Covent Garden, including her Nedda in Pagliacci which brought her international acclaim in Franco Zeffirelli's controversial production during the 1959/1960 season. The critic Alan Blyth considered this one of her best roles.

She sang Tytania in Benjamin Britten's A Midsummer Night's Dream, conducted by Georg Solti in his first new production after becoming the company's musical director in 1960. Philip Hope-Wallace, The Guardian 's music critic, noted that the magic which emanated from the stage came in part from "the silvery top of Joan Carlyle's voice".

1962 saw her Pamina in The Magic Flute conducted by Otto Klemperer; her first Countess in Le nozze di Figaro was under Solti, with Tito Gobbi as the Count. In another opera conducted by Solti in 1967, Carlyle sang the title role in Richard Strauss' Arabella. She was the first British singer to perform this role, which she sang opposite Dietrich Fischer-Dieskau.

Other roles, which she performed throughout many seasons included Oscar in Un ballo in maschera, a performance which Montague Haltrecht, in his biography of the first ROH general administrator David Webster, describes as "the young Joan Carlyle makes a pageboy with a delicious vocal glitter"; Ascanius in Les Troyens; and Mimi in Peter Brook's staging of La bohème which resulted in a BBC Television production of the opera. At Glyndebourne in 1965 she played the Countess in Le nozze di Figaro.

Michael Tippett's The Midsummer Marriage was presented in the house in 1972 with Carlyle as Jenifer. She recorded the part in the first complete recording of this work.

In Italian opera her successes include Desdemona in Verdi's Otello with James McCracken in the 1965–66 season, and subsequently with Vickers in 1972, where her performance was noted by Hope-Wallace as "experienced, dignified, and often very touching, though at first too pale, muffled and cautious." Her last Covent Garden performance was in 1976 as Freia in Das Rheingold.

== Career beyond England ==
Carlyle appeared as Mimì in La bohème at La Scala in Milan under Herbert von Karajan. Performances were given at the Munich Festival (where her Zdenka in Strauss's Arabella opposite Lisa Della Casa prompted her interest in the title role), in Brussels, Monaco, and the Netherlands as well as at the Vienna State Opera, the Berlin State Opera, and the Bavarian State Opera in Munich. In 1968 she appeared at the Teatro Colón in Buenos Aires. Other houses at which she sang included the Teatro San Carlo in Naples.

== Concert repertoire ==
Carlyle pursued a concert career alongside her operatic engagements. Her concert repertoire included Beethoven's Ninth Symphony, Mozart's Requiem, Brahms's German Requiem and the Szymanowski Stabat Mater, Poulenc's Gloria, Orff's Carmina Burana and Mahler's Fourth Symphony.

== Recordings ==
In her first recording, Carlyle was featured as "The Voice From Heaven" in a Decca release of Verdi's Don Carlo in June/July 1965 with the ROH Orchestra conducted by Solti. Featured singers include Carlo Bergonzi, Renata Tebaldi, Grace Bumbry, Nicolai Ghiaurov, and Martti Talvela. Details of her other recordings appear on her website.

== Later life and death ==
In retirement, Carlyle lived in Wales and taught singing privately. She previously taught master classes and workshops at such institutions as the Royal College of Music in London.

Carlyle died on 31 October 2021, at the age of 90.
