= Elizabeth Harwood =

British opera singer (1938–1990)

Harwood as Handel's Semele, 1964

Elizabeth Harwood (27 May 1938 – 22 June 1990) was an English lyric soprano. After a music school, she enjoyed an operatic career lasting for over two decades and worked with such conductors as Colin Davis and Herbert von Karajan. She was one of the few English singers of her generation to be invited to sing in productions at the Salzburg Festival and La Scala, Milan, as well as at the Metropolitan Opera.

After early performances at Glyndebourne and five years at Sadler's Wells Opera Company in the 1960s, Harwood sang at Covent Garden and Scottish Opera before building an international reputation in the 1970s. Her repertoire was extensive, but she was particularly notable for her performances in the operas of Mozart and Richard Strauss. In the concert hall, she performed in oratorio, and in her later years she concentrated on Lieder recitals.

She died of cancer at the age of 52.

== Biography ==
=== Early years ===
Harwood was born in Barton Seagrave, a suburb of Kettering, but grew up in Yorkshire. She attended Skipton Girls' High School. Her parents were both musical, and her mother, a professional soprano, taught her singing. Harwood later said of her childhood, "My mother sang under the name Constance Read, and she did quite a bit of early broadcasting from Birmingham. When she had her children – there were three of us – she did local singing and took up her teaching. My father, in the Methodist Chapel tradition, did a good deal of conducting". Harwood continued her studies at the Royal Manchester College of Music from 1956. In 1957, for the Buxton Opera Group, she sang Michaela in Passion Flower, an adaptation of Carmen. In a student production of Massenet's Werther in 1958, she won praise as Sophie. At the age of 21, she won the Kathleen Ferrier Memorial Scholarship and spent a year in Milan studying with Lina Pagliughi. She was later a joint winner of the international Verdi competition in Busseto.

=== Operatic career ===
Harwood made her professional début as Second Boy in The Magic Flute at Glyndebourne in 1960. The critic of The Guardian wrote of an early performance by Harwood, "[her] voice, though not very big, is a real Mozart voice alive with an easy sensuousness that is rare among English sopranos." At a performance of Messiah in December 1960, Harwood's fellow soloists included Janet Baker, with whom she later made a series of critically praised appearances for Scottish Opera.

In 1961 Sadler's Wells Opera Company engaged her, and she played Gilda in Verdi's Rigoletto, Countess Adèle in Rossini's Le Comte Ory, and Phyllis in Gilbert and Sullivan's Iolanthe, in which the critic of The Gilbert and Sullivan Journal thought that "despite Elizabeth Harwood's beautiful singing, attractive costume and appearance, her spoken word was charged with innuendo, presenting a most worldly young lady". Her other early roles at Sadler's Wells included Mozart's Countess Almaviva in The Marriage of Figaro and Constanze in Die Entführung aus dem Serail, the title role in Massenet's Manon and of Richard Strauss's coloratura parts, Zerbinetta in Ariadne auf Naxos and the Fiakermilli in Arabella. Of this period The Times said, "Here Colin Davis was one of the leading influences on a soprano who looked well on stage and sang with a sense of fun."

In 1965 Harwood took a break from Sadler's Wells, and toured Australia with the Sutherland Williamson Grand Opera Company, alternating with Joan Sutherland as the title character in Lucia di Lammermoor and Amina in La sonnambula. After her return, Colin Davis left Sadler's Wells, and Harwood thought it time to move on. She joined the English Opera Group, singing Galatea in Acis and Galatea in Sweden, Versailles and at the Aldeburgh Festival. She made her Covent Garden début as the Fiakermilli in 1967, which she followed with other coloratura parts, such as Gilda, both of which she had sung in English at Sadler's Wells. She rarely sang in modern operas, but an exception was as Bella in Michael Tippett's The Midsummer Marriage, where "her radiant stage appearance was seen to good effect in the high lyrical role". Davis again was the conductor, and Harwood later made one of her biggest successes when appearing under his baton as Teresa in Berlioz's Benvenuto Cellini. Her other Covent Garden roles included Oscar in Un ballo in maschera, Donna Elvira in Don Giovanni, Norina in Don Pasquale, and the title roles in Arabella and Manon.

For Scottish Opera, between 1967 and 1974, she sang Lucia in Lucia di Lammermoor and Fiordiligi in Così fan Tutte to the Dorabella of Janet Baker, as well as Sophie to Baker's Oktavian in Der Rosenkavalier. In 1967, Harwood had played Donna Elvira in the Aix-en-Provence Festival's production of Don Giovanni. She was invited back in 1969 for Acis and Galatea. Her success in this and in her Scottish Opera roles attracted the attention of Herbert von Karajan, who invited her to appear at the Salzburg Festival the following year. There she played Fiordiligi and Constanze, and two years later Karajan cast her as the Countess in his Salzburg production of The Marriage of Figaro. He invited her to play roles at several more Salzburg Festivals. She made her début at La Scala, Milan, as Constanze in 1971 and played other roles there in 1972. Her début at the Metropolitan Opera, New York, was in 1975 as Fiordiligi. For Glyndebourne, Harwood played Fiordiligi, Countess Almaviva, and, in 1982, the Marschallin in Der Rosenkavalier. Her last operatic performance was in 1983 in La colombe at Sadlers' Wells.

=== Concerts and last years ===
Throughout her career, Harwood gave numerous recitals and took part in many oratorios. She performed over 100 times in Messiah, the first time being at age 16, filling in for her mother. During the 1980s, she toured in concert internationally, including New Zealand (1983), Australia (1986), and British Columbia (1988). She was invited to sing on many occasions at the Rasiguères Festival of Wine and Music in France. From the mid-1970s, Harwood began to concentrate on song recitals: The Times wrote of this period in her career, "In the mid-1970s ... she was more likely to be heard in Lieder at the Queen Elizabeth Hall and the Wigmore Hall than at Covent Garden". One of her later appearances was at the Queen Elizabeth Hall in 1986, in a programme including Schubert Lieder. Her final public performance was in November 1989 at the Bath Festival.

In 1966, she married the businessman Julian A. C. Royle, a publisher of greetings cards. They had one son, Nicholas.

Harwood died at her home in Fryerning, Essex, England in 1990, aged 52, from cancer. The Musical Times wrote of her,

"Elizabeth Harwood's lovely, warm voice, with its effortless production and evenness throughout a remarkable range, was matched by her level-headed approach to the world of opera and the generous nature of her personality."

Janet Baker said this about Harwood: "Elizabeth was the most beloved of my colleagues, a beautiful person in every way. Her art lit up the stage." The Elizabeth Harwood Memorial Award for Singers is given every year by the Royal Northern College of Music.

== Recordings ==
Harwood made many recordings. Among her earliest were a series of Gilbert and Sullivan discs, beginning with an abbreviated The Mikado recorded in Hamburg in 1961 along with other selections for World Record Club discs. She was a guest artist for Decca with the D'Oyly Carte Opera Company in 1964 as Elsie in The Yeomen of the Guard and in the title role in Princess Ida. Under the baton of Karajan, she recorded the title role of The Merry Widow for Deutsche Grammophon, and Musetta in La bohème for Decca. In Benjamin Britten's recording of his A Midsummer Night's Dream, she sang Tytania. Her other opera recordings include Delius's A Village Romeo and Juliet. A video recording of Harwood as Violetta in La traviata was issued in 1999. She appeared in the 1985 Tony Palmer film about Handel God Rot Tunbridge Wells!, singing 'I know that my redeemer liveth' from Messiah.

She had only one solo recital disc, a selection of English art songs by Frederick Delius, Ralph Vaughan Williams, Frank Bridge, Arnold Bax, Michael Head, George Lloyd, and Roger Quilter recorded in London in 1983, released on the Conifer label, with John Constable on the piano. It has not been reissued on compact disc. Another disc of traditional English songs such as Cherry Ripe and Early One Morning was a joint recital with baritone Owen Brannigan from 1964, conducted by Charles Mackerras.

In oratorio, Harwood was able to perform in both the traditional big-scale Handelian style and the emerging smaller-scale "period performance" style, recording the soprano part in Messiah for both Sir Malcolm Sargent, a traditionalist, and Charles Mackerras, whose 1967 recording was a landmark in period performance.

There is a recording of "Rigoletto" from Sadler's Wells Opera, in English, with Elizabeth Harwood, Donald Smith, Peter Glossop, Donald McIntyre, with the Sadler's Wells Orchestra conducted by James Lockhart - possibly 1963.
