= Reginald Goodall =

English conductor (1901–1990)

Sir Reginald Goodall CBE (13 July 1901 – 5 May 1990) was an English conductor and singing coach noted for his performances of the operas of Richard Wagner and for conducting the premieres of several operas by Benjamin Britten.

== Early life ==
Goodall was born in Lincoln, and studied at the Royal College of Music and elsewhere in Europe. In 1929, he became the organist and choirmaster at St Alban's Church, Holborn.

== Career ==
During World War II, Goodall conducted the Wessex Philharmonic, a freelance orchestra which included some ex-members of the Bournemouth Municipal Orchestra. In 1944, Goodall joined the Sadler's Wells company, forerunner of the English National Opera. An early triumph was his conducting of the premiere of Benjamin Britten's Peter Grimes in 1945. He conducted this again later at the Royal Opera House, Covent Garden, where he had first conducted in 1947. He was an assistant conductor to the music director of the Royal Opera House, Karl Rankl, in the late 1940s. Goodall also conducted at Glyndebourne, including another Britten premiere, this time of The Rape of Lucretia, which was also his first recording, with EMI.

Goodall spent much of his career conducting orchestras at the Royal Opera House and Sadler's Wells Opera. At Covent Garden, he was overshadowed by Georg Solti. When Solti was made music director of the Royal Opera in 1961, altercations soon followed, leading Goodall to cease conducting duties and withdraw to an upper-floor room, nicknamed "Valhalla", where he remained available to singers for coaching on request.

For Goodall, conducting success finally came with an appointment at Sadler's Wells, where from 1967 he worked in close collaboration with the head of the music staff, Leonard Hancock.

In the late 1960s and early 1970s, Goodall conducted several celebrated Wagner productions at Sadler's Wells Opera that reversed the decline in his prestige and established him as one of the leading Wagner conductors of his time. He conducted Die Meistersinger von Nürnberg in 1968, and the full Ring Cycle from 1970 to 1973, both productions sung in English.

His last public performance was in 1987 at the Royal Albert Hall, London, where he led the English National Opera Company in a performance of act 3 of Wagner's Parsifal. The cast included Gwynne Howell (Gurnemanz), Warren Ellsworth (Parsifal), Neil Howlett (Amfortas) and Shelagh Squires (Kundry).

== Fascism and Holocaust denials ==
Passionate about all things German, in the 1930s Goodall openly sympathised with the Nazi regime, which he perceived as a defender of Germanic cultural traditions. Goodall also actively supported Oswald Mosley's British Union of Fascists, and he eventually joined the party just five days after Britain's declaration of war on Germany. He maintained his outspoken pro-Nazi views during World War II, the uninhibited expression of which once led him to be briefly questioned by the police. Goodall was known to refer to the Holocaust as a "BBC Jewish plot".

== Reputation and legacy ==
Goodall achieved his own prominence in later life once he was able to come out from under the shadow of some of the great German and Austrian conductors of his era, for whom he understudied, conducted rehearsals and provided vocal coaching. Goodall was appreciated for his attention to detail and Wagner's annotations, as well as for his extensive rehearsals.

John Lucas published an authorised biography of Goodall in 1993.

== Family ==
Goodall married Eleanor Gibbs in 1932. They did not have children.
