= Lauris Elms =

Australian opera singer (born 1931)

Lauris Elms AM OBE
- Born: Lauris Margaret Elms; 20 October 1931 (age 94); Springvale, Victoria, Australia
- Genres: Opera, lieder
- Occupation: Singer
- Years active: 1952–1994 (retirement)

Lauris Margaret Elms AM OBE (born 20 October 1931) is an Australian retired contralto, renowned for her roles in opera and lieder and as a recording artist.

== Biography ==
She was born in Springvale, Victoria, the elder daughter of Harry Britton Elms and Jean (née Halford) and trained with Katherine Wielaert in Melbourne.

She first sang with the National Theatre Opera Company in 1952 in The Consul. She had further study in Paris with Dominique Modesti. She made her Royal Opera, Covent Garden debut in 1957 as Ulrica in Verdi's Un ballo in maschera, and was principal contralto at Covent Garden from 1957 to 1959. She appeared there in Elektra, Les Troyens, The Tales of Hoffmann, Dialogues of the Carmelites, Handel's Samson, Die Walküre, Lucia di Lammermoor, and Rigoletto. She also appeared as Mrs Sedley in Benjamin Britten's Peter Grimes, and in the Decca recording conducted by the composer.

She toured Israel in 1958 for the 10th anniversary of the State of Israel, appearing with the Israel Philharmonic Orchestra, in nine performances of Beethoven's Ninth Symphony conducted by Rafael Kubelík. In 1958 she married Graeme de Graaff, and they have one daughter, the clarinetist Deborah de Graaff.

Elms presented lieder recitals with Musica Viva Australia and the ABC throughout Australia between 1960 and 1970. In 1961 she was a soloist in Dvořák's Stabat Mater with the South Australian Symphony Orchestra under Karel Ančerl. Amongst the other soloists was Arnold Matters.

In 1965, she sang with the Sutherland–Williamson Opera Company and then with the Australian Elizabethan Theatre Trust and the Australian Opera from 1966 to 1987. She was much praised for her Arsace in Semiramide in 1965, Azucena (Verdi's Il trovatore) opposite Donald Smith and Elizabeth Fretwell and later with Kenneth Collins and Joan Sutherland in the Moshinsky/Nolan production. Between 1958 and 1973 she sang in five Royal Command performances. In 1970 she sang in Verdi's Requiem with an all-Australian cast of soloists, at the Royal Festival Hall, London, conducted by Charles Mackerras, marking the 200th anniversary of James Cook's charting of the east coast of Australia.

In 1973 she sang at the openings of the Adelaide Festival Theatre and the Sydney Opera House, and she appeared in the inaugural opera season at the latter venue in all three parts of Puccini's Il trittico. That year she also appeared as a soloist in Hector Berlioz's Les nuits d'été (Summer Nights) and lieder recitals in Korea. She performed with Marilyn Richardson in Ian Cugley's The Six Days of Creation, which was written for their voices. Her 1979 solo recital at the Opera House was the first ABC recital to feature a resident Australian singer. She gave recitals in China in 1983.

In 1987, Elms commissioned a song cycle from composer Derek Strachan. He produced Rose of the Bay, a cycle of nine songs for mezzo-soprano, clarinet and piano. It was premiered by Elms, Deborah de Graaff, and David Miller, and they went on to make the premiere recording.

Elms retired in 1994. In 2001 she published her autobiography The Singing Elms: The Autobiography of Lauris Elms.

== Honours ==
Elms was appointed an Officer of the Order of the British Empire (OBE) in 1974, awarded the Queen's Jubilee Medal in 1977, and appointed a Member of the Order of Australia (AM).

In 1988, the University of Sydney awarded her an honorary Doctorate of Music, and in 1995 she received the Rotary International Award for Vocational Excellence. In 2010 she received the Melbourne Green Room Award for Lifetime Achievement.

== Roles and recordings ==
Her principal roles were: Micah (Samson), Arsace (Semiramide), Amneris (Aida), Azucena (Il trovatore), Ulrica (Un ballo in maschera), Eboli (Don Carlos), the title role in Carmen, Frugola, Principessa, Zita, (Il trittico), Lucretia (The Rape of Lucretia), Mistress Quickly (Falstaff), Sesto (La clemenza di Tito), Caesar (Julius Caesar), Orpheus (Orpheus), Mrs Sedley (Peter Grimes), and Anna and Dido (Les Troyens), Bradamante (Alcina), Judith (Bluebeard's Castle), Delilah (Samson and Delilah), Fricka (Die Walküre), Erda (Siegfried), and the Ice Queen (Schwanda the Bagpiper).

Her recordings include:

- highlights from Bononcini's Griselda (title role)
- Benjamin Britten's Peter Grimes
- Chausson's Poème de l'amour et de la mer
- Elgar's Sea Pictures
- Highlights from Carl Heinrich Graun's Montezuma (title role)
- Handel's Alcina (with Joan Sutherland, Margreta Elkins, Spiro Malas and others)
- Liszt songs with David Miller
- Schubert lieder with John Winther
- Video of Verdi's Il trovatore with Joan Sutherland, conducted by Richard Bonynge, recorded at the Sydney Opera House
- Brahms, Duparc and Berg songs with Geoffrey Parsons
- Debussy and Beethoven song recitals
- Operatic arias with the Sydney Symphony Orchestra and the West Australian Symphony Orchestra
