= Griselda (Giovanni Bononcini) =

Opera by Giovanni Battista Bononcini

Griselda is a dramma per musica in three acts that was composed by Giovanni Bononcini. The opera uses a revised version of the 1701 Italian libretto by Apostolo Zeno that was based on Giovanni Boccaccio's The Decameron (X, 10, "The Patient Griselda"). The Italian poet Paolo Antonio Rolli was hired to revise the text. Bononcini's opera premiered in London at the King’s Theatre on 22 February 1722. From the opera, an aria "Per la gloria d'adorarvi" is nowadays a famous and popular concert piece, with opera singers such as Oleg Ryabets (performed in 2001, at Kasals Hall, Tokyo, and in 2005, at Festival Die Metamorfosen by Georges-Emmanuel Schneider, Interlaken), or Ramon Vargas (recording in 2002, Arie Antiche).

Bononcini's brother, Antonio Maria Bononcini, also composed his own opera to Zeno's libretto four years earlier.

== History ==
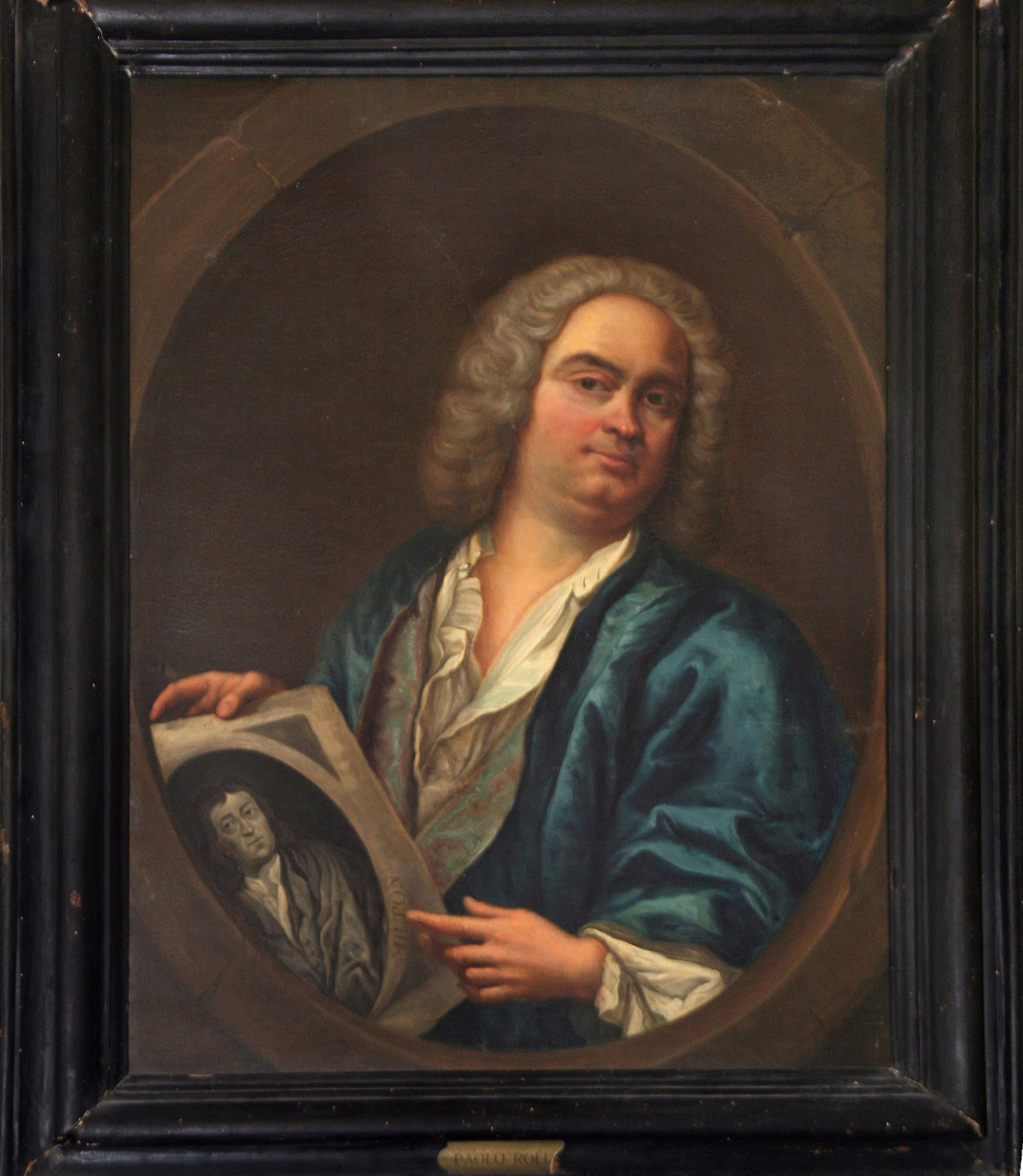
Paolo Antonio Rolli (1687 -1765)

The plot of Zeno’s libretto was for the most part retained in Bononcini's opera but the text was almost entirely rewritten by Paolo Antonio Rolli. The character Corrado was eliminated entirely and three of the main characters were renamed: Ottone became Rambaldo, Costanza became Almirena, and Roberto became Ernesto. The work was received well at its premiere and was successively performed numerous times over the next four months. One of the major reasons for this success was the prodigious acting and singing talent of Anastasia Robinson, who portrayed the title role. The opera was later revived by Handel and Heidegger’s company on 22 May 1733 under the urging of Francesco Bernardi, called Senesino, who portrayed Gualtiero in the original production.

Griselda is one of only two London operas for which Bononcini published the overture and all the arias. Charles Burney owned a score of Griselda, but neither it nor any other score including recitatives is extant.

== Music ==
Bononcini's music, although well crafted, is at times strangely juxtaposed to the opera's plot and text. The opera is filled with dulcet arias which are reminiscent of a pastoral opera rather than a story about a vindictive tyrant. Regardless, the music is enchanting and is largely responsible for the success of the work. Richard Steele wrote in The Conscious Lovers (1722), this about the opera's music: ". . . something in that Rural Cottage of Griselda, her forlorn Condition, her Poverty, her Solitude, her Resignation, her Innocent Slumbers, and that lulling Dolce Sogno that’s sung over her; it had an Effect upon me, that—in short I never was so well deceiv’d at any [other Opera]." Probably the most famous song from the opera is Ernesto's aria, "Per la gloria d’adorarvi," which remains to this day a popular selection for concert and recital performance. Other notable pieces include "Dolce sogno, deh le porta" and "Volgendo, a me lo sguardo" for Gualtiero. These three arias were very popular and were reprinted, for example in Richard Neale’s A Pocket Companion for Gentlemen and Ladies (London, 1724) and in The British Musical Miscellany (London, 1735).

== Roles ==
Role	Voice type	Premiere Cast, 22 February 1722
Griselda, wife of Gualtiero	contralto	Anastasia Robinson
Gualtiero, King of Thessaly	contralto (originally a castrato)	Senesino
Ernesto, lover of Almirena	soprano (originally castrato)	Benedetto Baldassari
Almirena, missing daughter of Griselda and Gualtiero	soprano	Maddalena Salvai
Rambaldo, a Sicilian nobleman	bass	Giuseppe Maria Boschi

== Synopsis ==
Place: Near Palermo in Sicily.

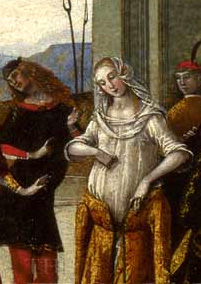
Detail from The Story of Patient Griselda, painted circa 1500

King Gualtiero has married Griselda, a peasant woman and his longtime mistress, and fears that she will not be accepted among the nobility. Concerned that a rebellion might arise, the king decides he must prove that Griselda is worthy to be their queen and the mother of their future king. He tests her virtue and steadfastness with a series of cruel ordeals, including telling her a lie that their long-lost daughter was killed on his orders. Gualtiero banishes Griselda from the court and announces that he intends to take another wife, the young woman Almirena, who is, unknown to all, their missing daughter. Almirena is highly upset over the king's proposal as she is in love with Ernesto.

Meanwhile, Griselda has returned to the humble cottage where she once lived. A beautiful woman, she has caught the attention of Rambaldo, a Sicilian nobleman, who attempts to woo her. After refusing him, Rambaldo threatens to kill her infant son, Everardo, unless she agrees to marry him. Griselda refuses and flees to the palace where she is permitted to stay as a servant to Almirena. Gualtiero, as a final test, orders Griselda to marry Rambaldo, which she refuses to his satisfaction. The king reveals his true motive for tormenting her and accepts her again as his queen to the satisfaction of Almirena and Ernesto who can now be reunited. Rambaldo, who confesses to have stirred up the nobles in the hope of winning Griselda, is forgiven.
