= Margreta Elkins =

Australian opera singer (1930–2009)

Margreta Elkins

Margreta Elkins AM (born Margaret Ann Enid Geater; 16 October 1930 – 1 April 2009) was an Australian mezzo-soprano. She sang at The Royal Opera with Opera Australia and other companies, but turned down offers to sing at the Metropolitan Opera, Bayreuth and Glyndebourne. She recorded alongside sopranos such as Maria Callas and Joan Sutherland.

== Early life and career: 1930–1955 ==
Margaret Ann Enid Geater was born in Brisbane, Queensland. She began her vocal studies at a convent school before winning an Australian state scholarship in 1949. That same year, she married Henry Elkins and adopted Margreta Elkins as her stage name. Also that year she competed in the Mobil Quest against Joan Sutherland. In 1950, she toured Queensland and appeared in Faust as Siébel; Il trovatore as Azucena; and Madama Butterfly as Suzuki. In 1952 she joined and toured with the National Opera Company of Australia, making her first appearances in Brisbane as Carmen in 1953 and as Azucena, in 1954. She entered the Mobil Quest again in 1956, winning second prize.

== International success: 1956–1969 ==
Moving to Europe in 1956, she was based there for the next twenty years. She began her European career performing with the Dublin Grand Opera Society and the Carl Rosa Opera Company in such roles as the title role in Carmen and Dorabella in Così fan tutte. In 1958, she became a resident principal mezzo-soprano at The Royal Opera, making her debut there as Amneris in Aida. She sang regularly at that house for the next ten years in such operas as Lucia di Lammermoor as Alisa; Der Rosenkavalier as Octavian; Die Walküre as Sieglinde; and Malcolm Williamson's The Growing Castle as The Poet, among others. She also notably sang Hippolyta in the London premiere of Benjamin Britten's A Midsummer Night's Dream (1961), directed by Sir John Gielgud, and portrayed the role of Helen in the world premiere of Michael Tippett's King Priam on 29 May 1962 in Coventry. Her other opera roles included Herodias in Salome, Maffio Orsini in Lucrezia Borgia, Brangäne in Tristan und Isolde, and Delilah in Samson and Delilah.

Elkins was a frequent collaborator with Joan Sutherland for performances in London, sharing the stage with her in Norma as Adalgisa; Alcina as Ruggiero; Rodelinda as Bertarido; and as Alisa to Sutherland's Lucia. Elkins also sang the role of Alisa opposite Maria Callas's Lucia for her 1959 recording of the opera with conductor Tullio Serafin. Callas had heard Elkins in rehearsal and chose her to sing Alisa for the EMI recording. Elkins partnership with Sutherland also resulted in a number of studio recordings of complete operas led by Richard Bonynge for Decca Records. She also joined Sutherland and Bonynge's 1965 tour of Australia with the Sutherland-Williamson Opera Company.

In November 1964, Elkins appeared alongside Noël Coward, Dame Margot Fonteyn and others in a 90th birthday tribute to Sir Winston Churchill. It was around this time that she declined an offer to appear at the Metropolitan Opera in New York, as she did not like the part she was offered. She had earlier refused an offer to sing at Glyndebourne, for contractual reasons. However, Elkins did make appearances at the Teatro di San Carlo, the Teatro Carlo Felice, the Liceu, the Opera Company of Boston and the New Orleans Opera during the 1960s. She also sang two roles with the Philadelphia Lyric Opera Company, Siébel in 1965 and Adalgisa in 1968, both with Sutherland.

== Later life and career: 1970–2009 ==
After the birth of her daughter Emma in 1970, Elkins decided to limit significantly her performances outside Australia and spent most her remaining career performing in her own country. She toured Australia in recital for the ABC a number of times and became a principal member of the Australian Opera in 1976. That same year she declined an offer to sing at the Bayreuth Festival for family reasons. But she remained a committed Wagnerian and considered her Sieglinde in Die Walküre for the AO as the highlight of her career. She left AO to go freelance in 1980. She recorded Elgar's Sea Pictures with the Queensland Symphony Orchestra in 1983, a recording which is often compared favourably with Dame Janet Baker's.

On 11 June 1984, Elkins was made a Member of the Order of Australia (AM) for service to opera. She was a Sessional Lecturer in Voice at the Queensland Conservatorium and taught at The Hong Kong Academy for Performing Arts. She was awarded an honorary doctorate from the University of Queensland in 1986.

In 1990, she appeared as Azucena in Il trovatore for Queensland Lyric Opera. In 2002 she returned to the stage once more, as Mamma Lucia in Cavalleria rusticana for Opera Queensland where she was an honorary life member. She died in Brisbane of cancer in 2009, aged 78, survived by her husband and daughter.

== Recordings ==
- Margreta Elkins – The Classic Recordings (1983) ABC 461 922-2 – Rosina (William Shield), Sea Pictures (Edward Elgar), "The Altar is adorned for the Sacrifice" from The Growing Castle (Malcolm Williamson); Queensland Symphony Orchestra, Werner Andreas Albert

Vincenzo Bellini

- I puritani – Joan Sutherland (Elvira), Margreta Elkins (Enrichetta di Francia), Pierre Duval (Arturo Talbot); Piero de Palma (Sir Bruno Robertson), Renato Capecchi (Sir Riccardo Forth), Ezio Flagello (Sir Giorgio), Giovanni Fioiani (Lord Gualtiero Valton), Coro del Maggio Musicale Fiorentino, Orchestra del Maggio Musicale Fiorentino, Richard Bonynge (conductor) –recorded 1963– Decca 448 969-2 / Decca 467 789-2 (part of a 10-CD set) / London POCL 3965-7
- La sonnambula – Joan Sutherland (Amina), Sylvia Stahlman (Lisa), Margreta Elkins (Teresa), Nicola Monti (Elvino), Angelo Mercuriali (Notary), Fernando Corena (Rodolfo), Giovanni Fioiani (Alessio), Coro del Maggio Musicale Fiorentino, Orchestra del Maggio Musicale Fiorentino, Richard Bonynge recorded 1962 – Decca 00289 448 9662 6 / 000320702 / 455 823-2 – Track listing
- Beatrice di Tenda [does not feature Elkins] with arias from Norma, I puritani (performers as above) and La sonnambula (as above), which do feature Elkins – Decca 00289 433 7062 2 – Track listing and excerpts
- Norma – Joan Sutherland (Norma), Margreta Elkins (Adalgisa), Ronald Stevens (Pollione), Clifford Grant (Oroveso), Etela Piha (Clotilde), Trevor Brown (Flavio), The Opera Australia Chorus, The Elizabethan Sydney Orchestra, Richard Bonynge, recorded 1978 – DVD Arthaus Musik 100 180

Giovanni Bononcini

- Griselda – Lauris Elms (Griselda), Joan Sutherland (Ernesto), Monica Sinclair (Gualtiero), Margreta Elkins (Almirena), Spiro Malas (Rambaldo), Ambrosian Opera Chorus, London Philharmonic Orchestra, Richard Bonynge, recorded 1967. Decca 448 977-2 (coupled with Montezuma)

Gaetano Donizetti

- Emilia di Liverpool [does not feature Elkins] / Lucia di Lammermoor (excerpts) – Joan Sutherland (Lucia), Margreta Elkins (Alisa), Joao Gibin (Edgardo), Tullio Serafin (conductor). Recorded 26 February 1959 – Myto Records MCD 91545 (Probably these are excerpts from the same performance as the Melodram recording.)
- Lucia di Lammermoor (Highlights) – Maria Callas (Lucia), Ferruccio Tagliavini, Piero Cappuccilli, Bernard Ładysz, Leonard del Ferro, Margreta Elkins (Alisa), Renzo Casellato, Philharmonia Chorus London, Philharmonia Orchestra London, Tullio Serafin, recorded 1959 – EMI
- Lucia di Lammermoor – Joan Sutherland (Lucia), João Gibin (Edgardo), John Shaw (Enrico), Joseph Rouleau (Raimondo), Kenneth MacDonald (Arturo), Margreta Elkins (Alisa), Robert Bowman (Normanno), Chorus & Orchestra of the Royal Opera House, Covent Garden, Tullio Serafin, recorded 1959 – Golden Melodram GM 50024 or Giuseppe di Stefano GDS 21017 or Bella Voce BLV 107 218 (highlights). 2006 release: Royal Opera House Heritage Series ROHS 002.
- Lucia di Lammermoor – Joan Sutherland (Lucia), André Turp (Edgardo), John Shaw (Enrico), Joseph Rouleau (Raimondo), Kenneth MacDonald (Arturo), Margreta Elkins (Alisa), Edgar Evans (Normanno), Chorus & Orchestra of the Royal Opera House, Covent Garden, John Pritchard, recorded 1961 – Celestial Audio CA 345
- Lucrezia Borgia – Joan Sutherland (Lucrezia Borgia), Ronald Stevens (Gennaro), Margreta Elkins (Maffio Orsini), Richard Allman (Don Alfonso), Robin Donald (Jacopo Liveretto), Lyndon Terracini (Don Apostolo Gazella), Gregory Yurisich (Ascanio Petrucci), Lamberto Furlan (Oloferno Vitellozzo), Pieter Van der Stolk (Gubetta), Graeme Ewer (Rustighello), John Germain (Astolfo), Neville Grave (Un servo), Eddie Wilden (Un coppiere), Jennifer Bermingham (Principessa Negroni), Australian Opera Chorus, Sydney Elizabethan Orchestra, Richard Bonynge, recorded 1977. VHS Video Cassette – Castle Video CV2845 (PAL); Polygram-Vidéo 070 031-3 (SECAM) Polygram 079 261-3 (PAL)
- Maria Padilla – Christian du Plessis, Margreta Elkins, Janet Price, Malcolm King, Patricia Sabin, Gunnar Drago, Ian Caley, Bournemouth Sinfonietta, Opera Rara Chorus, Kenneth Montgomery – Opera D'oro 1416
- Maria Stuarda – Joan Sutherland (Maria), Huguette Tourangeau (Elisabeta), Luciano Pavarotti (Leicester), Roger Soyer (Talbot), Margreta Elkins (Anna), James Morris (Cecil), Coro del Teatro Comunale di Bologna, Orchestra del Teatro Comunale di Bologna, Richard Bonynge recorded 1975 – Decca 00289 425 4102 / Lyrica LRC 1040/1041 – Track listing and excerpts
- Ne M'oubliez Pas with songs from Imelda de' Lambertazzi, Dom Sébastien, Gianni di Parigi, Roberto Devereux, Il diluvio universale – Margreta Elkins, Alexander Oliver, Christian du Plessis, Geoffrey Mitchell Choir, Philharmonia Orchestra, James Judd – Opera Rara ORC4 – Elkins is the principal singer on all the tracks of this CD.

Charles Gounod

- Faust – Joan Sutherland (Marguerite), Franco Corelli (Faust), Nicolai Ghiaurov (Méphistophélès), Robert Massard (Valentin), Margreta Elkins (Siébel), Monica Sinclair (Marthe ), Raymond Myers (Wagner), Ambrosian Opera Chorus and Highgate School Choir, London Symphony Orchestra, Richard Bonynge (conductor) Decca 0289 4705632 4 (2002 release) / 421 240-2 (1991 release) / 467 059-2 / London POCL 3962-4 Track listing and audio samples

George Frideric Handel

- Alcina – Joan Sutherland (Alcina), Margreta Elkins (Ruggiero), Lauris Elms (Bradamante), Richard Greager (Oronte), Narelle Davidson (Morgana), Ann-Maree McDonald (Oberto), John Wegner (Melisso), Chorus and Orchestra of Australian Opera, Richard Bonynge, recorded 1983. Celestial Audio CA 112
- Alcina [does not feature Elkins] coupled with Giulio Cesare in Egitto (highlights) – Margreta Elkins (Giulio Cesare), Joan Sutherland (Cleopatra), Marilyn Horne (Cornelia), Monica Sinclair (Tolomeo), Richard Conrad (Sesto), New Symphonic Orchestra of London, Richard Bonynge – Decca 00289 433 7232 / 467063-2 / 467 067-2 – Track listing and excerpts
- Rodelinda – Alfred Hallett (Grimoaldo), Raimund Herincx (Garibaldo), Joan Sutherland (Rodelinda), Dame Janet Baker (Eduige), Margreta Elkins (Bertarido), Patricia Kern (Unolfo), Chandos Singers, Philomusica Antiqua Orchestra, Charles Farncombe. An English language version, recorded live on 24 June 1959. – Opera D'oro OPD 1189 (2 CDs) or Memories HR 4577–4578 or Living Stage LS 403 35147 (highlights).
- Rodelinda – Joan Sutherland (Rodelinda), Huguette Tourangeau (Bertarido), Eric Tappy (Grimoaldo), Margreta Elkins (Eduige), Cora Canne Meijer (Unolfo), Pieter Van Den Berg (Garibaldo), Netherlands Chamber Orchestra, Richard Bonynge. Recorded 30 June 1973 – Bella Voce BLV 10 7206.

Wolfgang Amadeus Mozart

- Idomeneo – Sergei Baigildin (Idomeneo), Margreta Elkins (Idamante), Henri Wilden (Arbace), Leona Mitchell (Ilia), Joan Sutherland (Elettra), Australian Opera Chorus, Sydney Elizabethan Orchestra, Richard Bonynge, recorded 1979. Gala GLH 826 (highlights) and Celestial Audio CA 060 (highlights)

Giuseppe Verdi

- Otello "Piangea cantando" (Willow Song) on Great Moments Of Elisabeth Schwarzkopf – EMI Classics 00289 470 0262 / 67634

Richard Wagner

- Die Walküre – Birgit Nilsson, Jon Vickers, London Symphony Orchestra, Erich Leinsdorf – Decca 00289 470 4432 1 – Elkin's role: Waltraute – Track listing and excerpts

Elkins also features on many compilation CDs drawing from the above recordings.

Note: The list above is drawn mainly from currently available recordings: there may be other recordings that will eventually be reissued. Catalogue numbers seem to vary between countries and their format varies between retailers. Audio samples are often available on online retailers' sites.
