= Owners, lessees and managers of the Royal Opera House, Covent Garden =

The somewhat involved history of the ownership and management of the Royal Opera House, Covent Garden can be split up into four main categories: the successive physical theatre buildings; the managers of the various theatrical and operatic companies which played there (historically, a mixture of actor-managers and impresarios); the leaseholders of the opera houses built on the land; and the owners of the freehold (i.e. ground landlords). From the early 20th century the theatre's management tended to be split between a general administrator and a musical/artistic director.

The horizontal alignment of dates in the table is only approximate.

Theatre	Management	Leaseholder	Freeholder
First theatre December 1732 – September 1808	1732–1761; John Rich (Note: The original letters patent from Charles II, dated 15 January 1661/2 (illuminated, on vellum), authorizing Sir William Davenant to form one of two companies of actors, are held in the Rosenbach Museum & Library, Philadelphia. The other company was formed by Thomas Killigrew. The charter is illustrated in Clive E. Driver, A Selection from our Shelves: Books, manuscripts and drawings from the Philip H. & A.S.W. Rosenbach Foundation Museum (Philadelphia, 1973), No. 44; a highly reduced facsimile also appeared in The Sunday Times (5 December 1982). Source: "The Rosenbach Museum & Library, numbers 1 through 239". Catalogue of English Literary Manuscripts (CELM).)		1732; 3rd Duke of Bedford
First theatre December 1732 – September 1808	1732–1761; John Rich		1732–1771; 4th Duke of Bedford
First theatre December 1732 – September 1808	1761; John Beard, Rich's son-in-law	1761; Priscilla Rich (Note: In his will Rich stipulated that the proceeds of theatre leasehold and patents were to be divided up equally between his wife Priscilla and their four legitimate daughters.)	1732–1771; 4th Duke of Bedford
First theatre December 1732 – September 1808	1767; George Colman	July 1767; George Colman, William Powell, Thomas Harris, & John Rutherford (Note: These four bought the patents and ground leases for £60,000 from Rich's widow, Priscilla. John Beard's wife, Charlotte, got £12,000. Harris and Powell were in conflict with Colman and Rutherford, and the management seems to have changed several times between various sub-lessees. In 1768 Rutherford sold two-thirds of his quarter share to Henry Dagge of the Inner Temple, and the remaining one third to James Leake of the Strand. Powell died in 1769, and his daughter's one-sixteenth share passed to the violinist John Fisher, whom she married in around 1770. He devoted musical time and energy to the theatre, but he sold his share [to Harris?] when she died c1781. Colman sold [part of?] his share to James Leake in July 1774. Another source also says that George Colman sold his share in 1774 to Thomas Hull: this may refer to a separate deal at around the same time.)	1732–1771; 4th Duke of Bedford
First theatre December 1732 – September 1808	1774; Thomas Harris, sub-leased to Thomas Hull 1775–1782	1785: Thomas Harris (Note: By 1785 Harris had acquired 46/60 of both the leasehold of the theatre and the two patents, plus a twenty-one-year lease (jointly with Richard Brinsley Sheridan) of the remaining 14/60 of the patents, mainly financed by a long series of intricate mortgages involving Harris's brother-in-law, Thomas Longman, bookseller of Paternoster Row.) (owned nearly 75% of the lease)	1771–1802; 5th Duke of Bedford d. aged 36
First theatre December 1732 – September 1808	1803; Thomas Harris & John P. Kemble	1806: Thomas Harris and others (Note: In 1806 Harris sold back to Powell's descendants (George White and Ann Martindale) 1/60 of the patent which he had acquired in 1781, and a one-eighth share in his lease of 1793 from the Duke of Bedford. They in turn agreed to pay their proportion of the very high rent, and to meet some of Harris's expenses from 1802-3.)	1802–1839; 6th Duke of Bedford
Second theatre September 1809 – March 1856	1809: Henry Harris and J. P. Kemble; 1822: Charles Kemble; 1832: Alfred Bunn; 1835: D. W. Osbaldiston (Note: At a rent of £7,000 per annum, which he had been unable to pay.); 1837: W. C. Macready	1812; Henry Harris & John Kemble; George White & Mrs. Martindale (both descendants of William Powell)	1802–1839; 6th Duke of Bedford
Second theatre September 1809 – March 1856	1839: Madam Vestris and C. J. Mathews; 1842: Charles Kemble (again); 1843: William H. Wallack (Note: By 1843, when the Theatres Act 1843 finally abolished the monopoly rights of the two patent theatres, Covent Garden had virtually ceased to be a place of dramatic or musical entertainment and had become the venue for a series of meetings of the Anti-Corn Law League, whose long campaign was finally successful in 1846. See Sheppard 1970b, pp. 71-85, para. ¶43); 1845: ? Laurent; 1846: Frederick Beale; 1848: Edward Delafield	1820; Henry Harris (owned 7/12 share of the lease) (Note: Thomas Harris died in October 1820, and soon afterwards John Kemble transferred his one-sixth share to his younger brother, Charles Kemble. Henry Harris, with 7/12, was now the principal proprietor, and therefore succeeded to the management with Charles Kemble (1/6), John Willett (1/16) and John Forbes (1/16) (George White's sons-in-law and heirs): in March 1822 they entered into an agreement with Henry Harris by means of which they were to have control of the theatre for ten years. There was opposition from Francis Const, a lawyer, who inherited a life interest in one eighth (2/16) from Mrs. Martindale, recently deceased. Persistent wrangling between the lessees meant that the theatre did not prosper in the 1820s.)	1839–1861; 7th Duke of Bedford, d. aged 73
Second theatre September 1809 – March 1856	1849 – 1877; Frederick Gye; Sub-lessees: 1856: Professor Anderson (Note: This is the conjuror who organised an unruly bal masqé, at the end of which a fire broke out which destroyed the theatre in the early hours of 5 March 1856.); 1856-64 (part): Louisa Pyne & William Harrison; Various dates: Colonel Mapleson	1849–1878; Frederick Gye (Note: After the second theatre burned down, the 7th Duke granted Gye a new 90-year lease in 1856. To fund the rebuilding, a syndicate of 15 wealthy individuals invested £80,000. On 1 October 1857 Gye assigned the agreement for a 50-year sub-lease to three trustees, to hold on behalf of this London Opera Syndicate, which included E. M. Barry (£1,500), the principal contractors, C. and T. Lucas (£21,159 jointly), the sub-contractor for the ironwork, Mr. Henry Grissell (amount unknown) and the 7th Duke of Bedford (£19,600). Gye died in 1878, leaving the business to his sons.)	1839–1861; 7th Duke of Bedford, d. aged 73
Third theatre May 1858 – present	1849 – 1877; Frederick Gye; Sub-lessees: 1856: Professor Anderson; 1856-64 (part): Louisa Pyne & William Harrison; Various dates: Colonel Mapleson	1849–1878; Frederick Gye	1839–1861; 7th Duke of Bedford, d. aged 73
Third theatre May 1858 – present	1849 – 1877; Frederick Gye; Sub-lessees: 1856: Professor Anderson; 1856-64 (part): Louisa Pyne & William Harrison; Various dates: Colonel Mapleson	1849–1878; Frederick Gye	1861–1872; 8th Duke of Bedford
Third theatre May 1858 – present	1877–1884; Ernest Gye	1878 - c1890 Ernest Gye and his brothers	1872–1891; 9th Duke of Bedford, shot himself while insane
Third theatre May 1858 – present	1885–1887; Signor Lago (Note: Signor Lago had for several years been regisseur and general factotum to Frederick Gye and his successors. In 1892 Lago, who had managed the Imperial Opera Company of St. Petersburg at the Mariinsky Theatre, engaged Henry Wood to conduct an autumn season of opera at the Olympic Theatre (later demolished to make the Aldwych). Lago's enterprise failed: for example, he put on Lohengrin with Emma Albani: and Augustus Harris at the ROH—competing directly with Lago—gave Lohengrin with Adelina Patti.)	1878 - c1890 Ernest Gye and his brothers	1872–1891; 9th Duke of Bedford, shot himself while insane
Third theatre May 1858 – present	1888–1896; Augustus Harris, sub-leased from the Grand Opera Syndicate. (Note: Out of the main spring season of Grand Opera, masked balls had again become popular: in the 1890s those with a guinea for ticket could dance from midnight until 5 am to the band music of Lt. Dan Godfrey, father of Sir Dan Godfrey.)	c1890–1895 Andrew Montagu, sub-leased to Grand Opera Syndicate. (Note: Montagu acquired the lease from Gye, having bought up the mortgages of the surrounding properties. Montagu d. 1895, leaving the real estate to Denison Faber, who at the time was registrar of the Judicial Committee of the Privy Council, and later 1st Baron Wittenham. Faber sub-leased it to the Grand Opera Syndicate Ltd., formed out of the Grand Opera Syndicate after by Augustus Harris's death.)	1891–1893; 10th Duke of Bedford, died of diabetes aged 40
Third theatre May 1858 – present	1897–1900; Maurice Grau as a director of Grand Opera Syndicate Ltd., previously backers of Augustus Harris, with Neil Forsyth as General Manager	1896–1899; Denison Faber, 1st Baron Wittenham, sub-leased to Grand Opera Syndicate Ltd. (Note: In 1896 the Syndicate consisted of: the Marquess of Ripon, Lord Esher, Lord Wittenham (ie Faber), Mr. 'Harry' V. Higgins, chairman & managing director, and later Baron d'Erlanger.)	1893–1918; 11th Duke of Bedford, d. 1940 aged 64
Third theatre May 1858 – present	1901–1906; André Messager as musical director of GOS Ltd., Neil Forsyth as General Manager	1899–1929; Grand Opera Syndicate Ltd. (Note: The syndicate's previous 50-year sub-lease ran out in 1899: they purchased the leasehold from George D. Faber and negotiated a 30-year lease from the freeholder, the 11th Duke. This was due to expire in February 1929.) 1925–1927; Sub-leased by London Opera Syndicate (Note: The London Opera Syndicate, formed by the industrialist and art collector Samuel Courtauld, took a three-year sub-lease from the Grand Opera Syndicate which was described as 'though still alive, had ceased to function, [and] the "Phoenix" seemed really dead'.)	1893–1918; 11th Duke of Bedford, d. 1940 aged 64
Third theatre May 1858 – present	1907–1915; Percy Pitt as musical director of the Syndicate, Neil Forsyth as MD. Sub-leased to others, eg Raymond Roze for a winter season of opera in English 1913.	1899–1929; Grand Opera Syndicate Ltd. 1925–1927; Sub-leased by London Opera Syndicate	1893–1918; 11th Duke of Bedford, d. 1940 aged 64
Third theatre May 1858 – present	1914: Used as station for swearing-in of police Special Constables. 1915–1918: Used to store furniture from the hotels which had been taken over as offices by the Government	1899–1929; Grand Opera Syndicate Ltd. 1925–1927; Sub-leased by London Opera Syndicate	1893–1918; 11th Duke of Bedford, d. 1940 aged 64
Third theatre May 1858 – present	1918: Thomas Beecham (Note: Beecham had been involved with Covent Garden since 1912. The Beecham 1919 and 1920 seasons resulted in a financial fiasco. The liquidators were called in to the Beecham Opera Company, and Beecham was likely to be personally petitioned for bankruptcy. He was left with a white elephant which no-one wanted, and retired from public life in 1921 for several years to sort out his financial affairs.) 1925–1927: Summer seasons were given by London Opera Syndicate	1899–1929; Grand Opera Syndicate Ltd. 1925–1927; Sub-leased by London Opera Syndicate	1918–1924: Thomas Beecham & his younger brother Harry, a long and involved story. 1924–1928: Beecham Estates and Pills Ltd., a privately owned company with Beecham family interests
Third theatre May 1858 – present	1928–1933; Summer seasons were given by the Covent Garden Opera Syndicate. Beecham gave a brief season of grand opera in 1932.	1929–1932; The Syndicate's 30-year sub-lease was due to expire soon, and the building was under threat of demolition (Note: By 1929 the 90-year lease of 1857 from the 7th Duke of Bedford had about two more years to run. In the meantime, the freeholders, Covent Garden Properties Co. bought in the remainder of the Royal Opera Syndicate lease, and thereby became freeholders in possession.); 1929–1933: Sub-leased to Covent Garden Opera Syndicate until February 1933	1928–1961; Covent Garden Properties Company Ltd., a public real estate company (Note: Also associated with Covent Garden Estate Company Limited)
Third theatre May 1858 – present	1934–1936; Geoffrey Toye as managing director of the ROH Company, with Beecham as principal conductor and artistic director	1932–1939; The Royal Opera House Company took a 5-year lease (Note: The Chairman of the Royal Opera House Company was Viscount Allendale, with Philip Hill, Lady Cunard, and other peers of the realm.)	1928–1961; Covent Garden Properties Company Ltd., a public real estate company
Third theatre May 1858 – present	1936–1939; Managed by Beecham from 1936 after Toye was forced out	1932–1939; The Royal Opera House Company took a 5-year lease	1928–1961; Covent Garden Properties Company Ltd., a public real estate company
Third theatre May 1858 – present	1939–1944; Mecca Ballrooms (Mecca Cafés Ltd.) - dancing and entertainment for the troops		1928–1961; Covent Garden Properties Company Ltd., a public real estate company
Third theatre May 1858 – present	1944–1949; Covent Garden Opera Trust; Gen. Admin David Webster; Mus. Dir. Karl Rankl	1944–1949; Boosey & Hawkes	1928–1961; Covent Garden Properties Company Ltd., a public real estate company
Third theatre May 1858 – present	1949–present Covent Garden Trust (now Royal Opera House Covent Garden Ltd., Registered Charity Number: 211775)	1949–1961; Ministry of Works, with a forty-two-year lease, sublet to Covent Garden Trust	1928–1961; Covent Garden Properties Company Ltd., a public real estate company
Third theatre May 1858 – present	1949–present Covent Garden Trust (now Royal Opera House Covent Garden Ltd., Registered Charity Number: 211775)	1961–present Covent Garden Trust (main lessee)	1961–1980; Covent Garden Market Authority, a Statutory Corporation established in 1961 by Act of Parliament
Third theatre May 1858 – present	1949–present Covent Garden Trust (now Royal Opera House Covent Garden Ltd., Registered Charity Number: 211775)	1961–present Covent Garden Trust (main lessee)	1980–present Government for the Royal Opera House Covent Garden Ltd, parent company of The Royal Opera, The Royal Ballet, and the Orchestra of the ROH

== See also ==
- Managerial and musical heads of The Royal Opera, 1946 to date
