= The Royal Opera =

Opera company in London

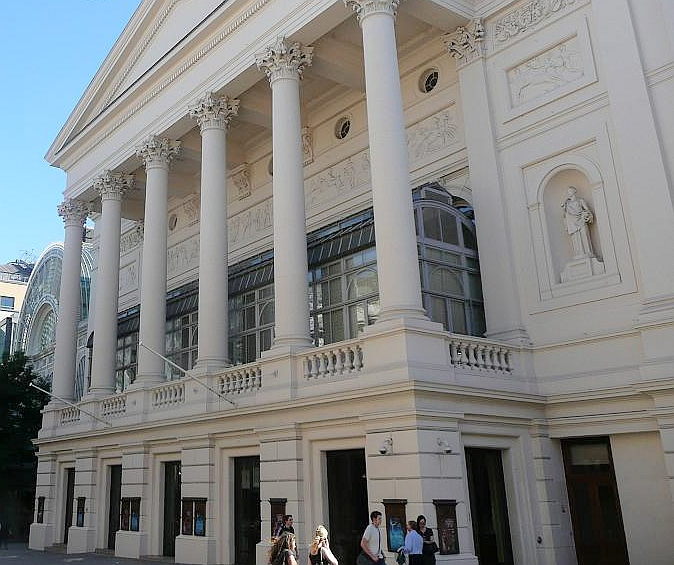
- The Royal Opera House, home of The Royal Opera
- Formation: 1946
- Type: Opera company
- Location: London
- Director of Opera: Oliver Mears
- Music Director: Jakub Hrůša
- Website: www.rbo.org.uk
- Formerly called: Covent Garden Opera Company

The Royal Opera is a British opera company based in central London, resident at the Royal Opera House in Covent Garden. Along with English National Opera, it is one of the two principal opera companies in London. Founded in 1946 as the Covent Garden Opera Company, the company had that title until 1968. It brought a long annual season and consistent management to a house that had previously hosted short seasons under a series of impresarios. Since its inception, it has shared the Royal Opera House with the dance company now known as The Royal Ballet. The two companies belong to an umbrella organisation, the Royal Ballet and Opera, which was known as the Royal Opera House prior to 2024.

When the company was formed, its policy was to perform all works in English, but since the late 1950s most operas have been performed in their original language. From the outset, performers have comprised a mixture of British and Commonwealth singers and international guest stars, but fostering the careers of singers from within the company was a consistent policy of the early years. Among the many guest performers have been Maria Callas, Plácido Domingo, Kirsten Flagstad, Hans Hotter, Birgit Nilsson, Luciano Pavarotti and Elisabeth Schwarzkopf. Among those who have risen to international prominence from the ranks of the company are Geraint Evans, Joan Sutherland, Kiri Te Kanawa and Jon Vickers.

The company's growth under the management of David Webster from modest beginnings to parity with the world's greatest opera houses was recognised by the grant of the title "The Royal Opera" in 1968. Under Webster's successor, John Tooley, appointed in 1970, The Royal Opera prospered, but after his retirement in 1988, there followed a period of instability and the closure of the Royal Opera House for rebuilding and restoration between 1997 and 1999. The 21st century has seen a stable managerial regime once more in place. The company has had seven music directors since its inception: Karl Rankl, Rafael Kubelík, Georg Solti, Colin Davis, Bernard Haitink, Antonio Pappano and Jakub Hrůša.

== History ==
=== Background ===
Between the two World Wars the provision of opera in Great Britain was variable in quality and quantity. At Covent Garden annual international seasons were organised ad hoc. English seasons were even less regular, and poorly supported by the public. ... The Grand Season was largely a social occasion and in practice tended not to include British artists. Artistic achievement was always limited by the paucity of rehearsals that could be called for visiting stars.

— Lords Goodman and Harewood
Report on Opera and Ballet in the United Kingdom, 1969

From the mid-19th century, opera had been presented on the site of Covent Garden's Royal Opera House, at first by Michael Costa's Royal Italian Opera company. After a fire, the new building opened in 1858 with The Royal English Opera company, which moved there from the Theatre Royal, Drury Lane. From the 1860s until the Second World War, various syndicates or individual impresarios presented short seasons of opera at the Royal Opera House (so named in 1892), sung in the original language, with star singers and conductors. Pre-war opera was described by the historian Montague Haltrecht as "international, dressy and exclusive". During the war, the Royal Opera House was leased by its owners, Covent Garden Properties Ltd, to Mecca Ballrooms who used it profitably as a dance hall. Towards the end of the war, the owners approached the music publishers Boosey and Hawkes to see if they were interested in taking a lease of the building and staging opera (and ballet) once more. Boosey and Hawkes took a lease, and granted a sub-lease at generous terms to a not-for-profit charitable trust established to run the operation. The chairman of the trust was Lord Keynes. (Note: The other members were Sir Kenneth Clark, Sir Stanley Marchant, William Walton and, from Boosey and Hawkes, Leslie Boosey and Ralph Hawkes. Keynes died in 1946 and was succeeded as chairman by the retired cabinet minister Lord Waverley, who served until his death in 1958.)

There was some pressure for a return to the pre-war regime of starry international seasons. Sir Thomas Beecham, who had presented many Covent Garden seasons between 1910 and 1939 confidently expected to do so again after the war. However, Boosey and Hawkes, and David Webster, whom they appointed as chief executive of the Covent Garden company, (Note: Webster used the job title "general administrator" throughout his tenure at Covent Garden.) were committed to presenting opera all year round, in English with a resident company. It was widely assumed that this aim would be met by inviting the existing Sadler's Wells Opera Company to become resident at the Royal Opera House. Webster successfully extended just such an invitation to the Sadler's Wells Ballet Company, but he regarded the sister opera company as "parochial". He was determined to set up a new opera company of his own. The British government had recently begun to give funds to subsidise the arts, and Webster negotiated an ad hoc grant of £60,000 and an annual subsidy of £25,000, enabling him to proceed.

=== Beginnings: 1946–1949 ===
Webster's first priority was to appoint a musical director to build the company from scratch. He negotiated with Bruno Walter and Eugene Goossens, but neither of those conductors was willing to consider an opera company with no leading international stars. Webster appointed a little-known Austrian, Karl Rankl, to the post. Before the war, Rankl had acquired considerable experience in charge of opera companies in Germany, Austria and Czechoslovakia. He accepted Webster's invitation to assemble and train the principals and chorus of a new opera company, alongside a permanent orchestra that would play in both operas and ballets.

The new company made its debut in a joint presentation, together with the Sadler's Wells Ballet Company, of Purcell's The Fairy-Queen on 12 December 1946. The first production by the opera company alone was Carmen, on 14 January 1947. Reviews were favourable. The Times said:

It revealed in Mr. Karl Rankl a musical director who knew how to conduct opera. It conceded the claims of theatrical production without sacrificing the music. It proved that contrary to expectation English can even now be sung so that the words are intelligible. It confirmed what we knew already about the quality of the chorus.

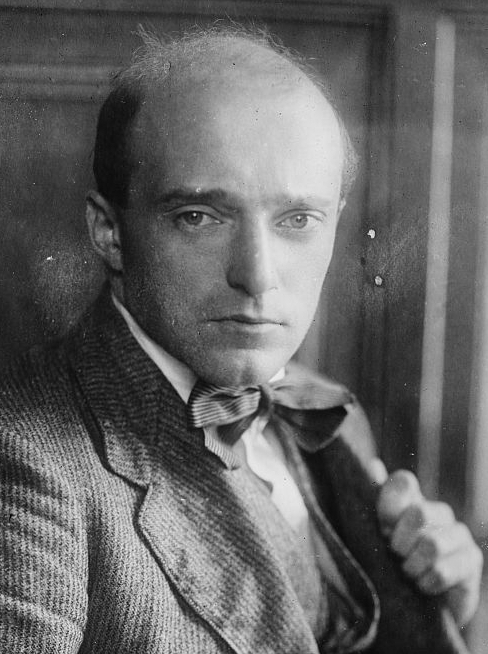
Erich Kleiber

All the members of the cast for the production were from Britain or the Commonwealth. (Note: The principals were Edith Coates as Carmen, with Kenneth Neate, Dennis Noble, Muriel Rae, David Franklin, Grahame Clifford, Audrey Bowman and Constance Shacklock.) Later in the season, one of England's few pre-war international opera stars, Eva Turner, appeared as Turandot. For the company's second season, eminent singers from continental Europe were recruited, including Ljuba Welitsch, Elisabeth Schwarzkopf, Paolo Silveri, Rudolf Schock and Set Svanholm. Other international stars who were willing to re-learn their roles in English for the company in its early years included Kirsten Flagstad and Hans Hotter for The Valkyrie. Nevertheless, even as early as 1948, the opera in English policy was weakening; the company was obliged to present some Wagner performances in German to recruit leading exponents of the main roles. At first Rankl conducted all the productions; he was dismayed when eminent guest conductors including Beecham, Clemens Krauss and Erich Kleiber were later invited for prestige productions. (Note: Rankl was resistant to allowing any outsiders to conduct his company, although he allocated performances of works he did not like to his staff conductors, Peter Gellhorn and Reginald Goodall.) By 1951 Rankl felt that he was no longer valued, and announced his resignation. In Haltrecht's view, the company that Rankl built up from nothing had outgrown him.

In the early years, the company sought to be innovative and widely accessible. Ticket prices were kept down: in the 1949 season 530 seats were available for each performance at two shillings and sixpence. (Note: This sum is equivalent to 12½ pence in decimal terms; about £3.50 in terms of 2010 retail prices.) In addition to the standard operatic repertory, the company presented operas by living composers such as Britten, Vaughan Williams, Bliss, and, later, Walton. The young stage director Peter Brook was put in charge of productions, bringing a fresh and sometimes controversial approach to stagings.

=== 1950s ===
After Rankl's departure the company engaged a series of guest conductors while Webster sought a new musical director. His preferred candidates, Erich Kleiber, John Barbirolli, Josef Krips, Britten and Rudolf Kempe, were among the guests but none would take the permanent post. It was not until 1954 that Webster found a replacement for Rankl in Rafael Kubelík. Kubelík announced immediately that he was in favour of continuing the policy of singing in the vernacular: "Everything that the composer has written should be understood by the audience; and that is not possible if the opera is sung in a language with which they are not familiar". (Note: Kubelik added that some operas are untranslatable, notably those of Wagner.) This provoked a public onslaught by Beecham, who continued to maintain that it was impossible to produce more than a handful of English-speaking opera stars, and that importing singers from continental Europe was the only way to achieve first-rate results.

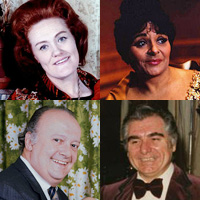
1950s stars, clockwise from top left, Joan Sutherland, Victoria de los Ángeles, Geraint Evans, Tito Gobbi

Despite Beecham's views, by the mid-1950s the Covent Garden company included many British and Commonwealth singers who were already or were soon to be much sought after by overseas opera houses. Among them were Joan Carlyle, Marie Collier, Geraint Evans, Michael Langdon, Elsie Morison, Amy Shuard, Joan Sutherland, Josephine Veasey and Jon Vickers. Nevertheless, as Lords Goodman and Harewood put it in a 1969 report for the Arts Council, "[A]s time went on the operatic centre of British life began to take on an international character. This meant that, while continuing to develop the British artists, it was felt impossible to reach the highest international level by using only British artists or singing only in English". Guest singers from abroad in the 1950s included Maria Callas, Boris Christoff, Victoria de los Ángeles, Tito Gobbi and Birgit Nilsson. Kubelík introduced Janáček's Jenůfa to British audiences, sung in English by a mostly British cast.

The verdict of the public on whether operas should be given in translation or the original was clear. In 1959, the opera house stated in its annual report, "[T]he percentage attendance at all opera in English was 72 per cent; attendance at the special productions marked by higher prices was 91 per cent … it is 'international' productions with highly priced seats that reduce our losses". The opera in English policy was never formally renounced. On this subject, Peter Heyworth wrote in The Observer in 1960 that Covent Garden had "quickly learned the secret that underlies the genius of British institutions for undisturbed change: it continued to pay lip service to a policy that it increasingly ignored". (Note: After the general practice had changed to using the original language, there were still occasional productions presented in translation, such as Poulenc's The Carmelites, starring Régine Crespin, Valerie Masterson and Felicity Lott in 1983, and Janáček's The Cunning Little Vixen under Sir Charles Mackerras in 2010.)

By the end of the 1950s, Covent Garden was generally regarded as approaching the excellence of the world's greatest opera companies. Its sister ballet company had achieved international recognition and was granted a royal charter in 1956, changing its title to "The Royal Ballet"; the opera company was close to reaching similar eminence. Two landmark productions greatly enhanced its reputation. In 1957, Covent Garden presented the first substantially complete professional staging at any opera house of Berlioz's vast opera The Trojans, directed by John Gielgud and conducted by Kubelík. The Times commented, "It has never been a success; but it is now". In 1958 the present theatre's centenary was marked by Luchino Visconti's production of Verdi's Don Carlos, with Vickers, Gobbi, Christoff, Gré Brouwenstijn and Fedora Barbieri, conducted by Carlo Maria Giulini. The work was then a rarity, (Note: The last Covent Garden performances had been given by Beecham in 1933.) and had hitherto been widely regarded as impossible to stage satisfactorily, but Visconti's production was a triumph.

=== 1960s ===
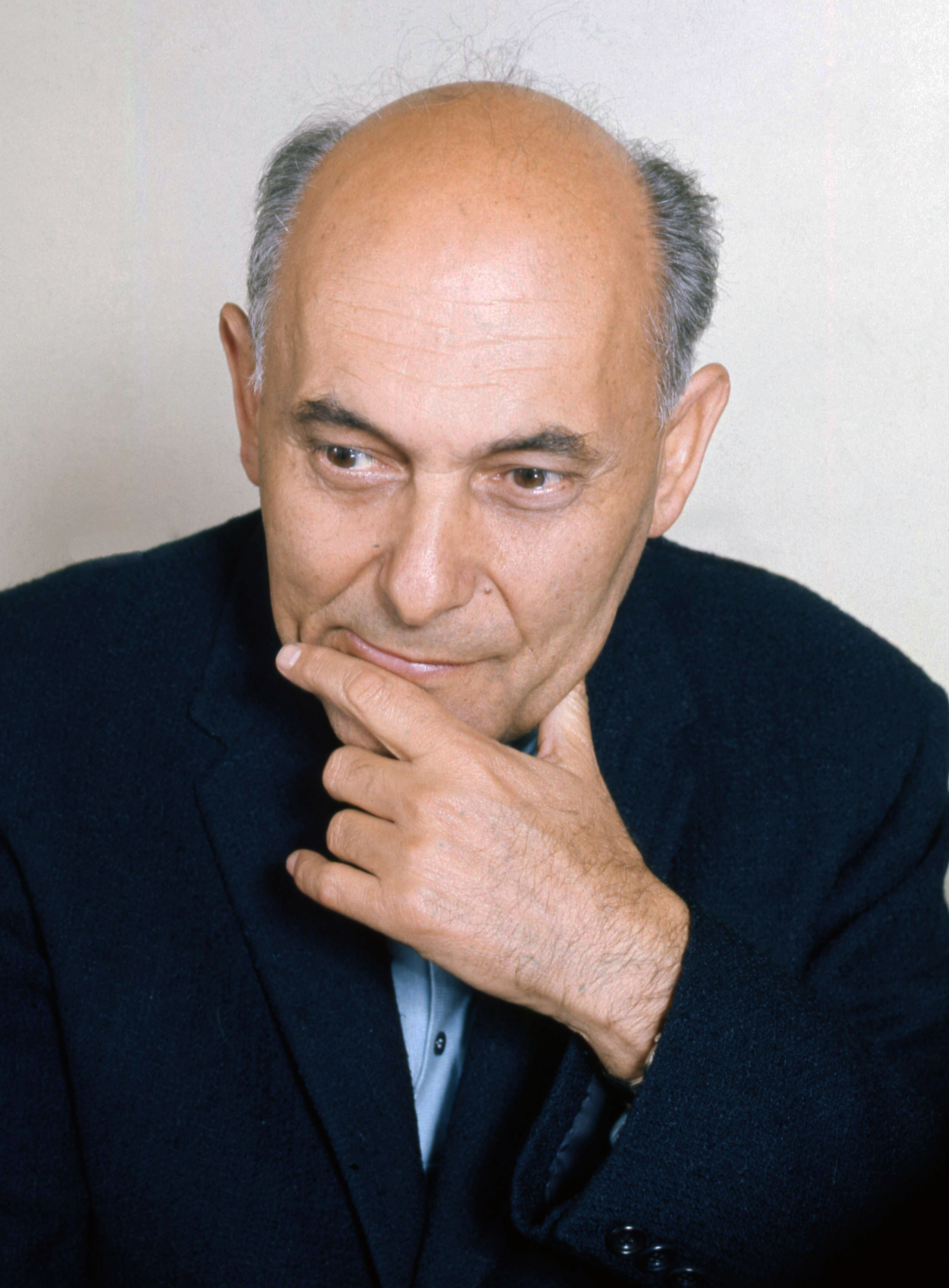
Georg Solti, musical director 1961–71

Kubelík did not renew his contract when it expired, and from 1958 there was an interregnum until 1961, covered by guest conductors including Giulini, Kempe, Tullio Serafin, Georg Solti and Kubelík himself. In June 1960 Solti was appointed musical director from the 1961 season onwards. With his previous experience in charge of the Munich and Frankfurt opera houses, he was at first uncertain that Covent Garden, not yet consistently reaching the top international level, was a post he wanted. Bruno Walter persuaded him otherwise, and he took up the musical directorship in August 1961. The press gave him a cautious welcome, but there was some concern about a drift away from the company's original policies:

[A] recent shift in policy towards engaging eminent singers and conductors from abroad, which is a reversion to what has been at once traditional and fatal to the establishment of a permanent organization, a kind of diffused grand season, has endangered the good work of the past fifteen years. ... The purpose of a subsidy from the Exchequer was to lay foundations for an English opera, such as is a feature of the culture of every other country in Europe.

[Solti] announced his intention of making Covent Garden 'quite simply, the best opera house in the world', and in the opinion of many he succeeded.

— Grove Dictionary of Music and Musicians

Solti, however, was an advocate of opera in the vernacular, (Note: The music journalist Norman Lebrecht asserts that Solti was opposed to opera in English, but cites no evidence in support of the statement.) and promoted the development of British and Commonwealth singers in the company, frequently casting them in his recordings and important productions in preference to overseas artists. Among those who came to prominence during the decade were Gwyneth Jones and Peter Glossop. Solti demonstrated his belief in vernacular opera with a triple bill in English of L'heure espagnole, Erwartung and Gianni Schicchi. Nevertheless, Solti and Webster had to take into account the complete opposition on the part of such stars as Callas to opera in translation. Moreover, as Webster recognised, the English-speaking singers wanted to learn their roles in the original so that they could sing them in other countries and on record. Increasingly, productions were in the original language. In the interests of musical and dramatic excellence, Solti was a strong proponent of the stagione system of scheduling performances, rather than the traditional repertory system. (Note: Under the old repertory system, a company would have a certain number of operas in its repertoire, and they would be played throughout the season in a succession of one or two night performances, with little or no rehearsal each time. Under the stagione system, works would be revived in blocks of perhaps ten or more performances, fully rehearsed for each revival.) By 1967, The Times said, "Patrons of Covent Garden today automatically expect any new production, and indeed any revival, to be as strongly cast as anything at the Met in New York, and as carefully presented as anything in Milan or Vienna".

The company's repertory in the 1960s combined the standard operatic works and less familiar pieces. The five composers whose works were given most frequently were Verdi, Puccini, Wagner, Mozart and Richard Strauss; the next most performed composer was Britten. Rarities performed in the 1960s included operas by Handel and Janáček (neither composer's works being as common in the opera house then as now), and works by Gluck (Iphigénie en Tauride), Poulenc (The Carmelites), Ravel (L'heure espagnole) and Tippett (King Priam). There was also a celebrated production of Schoenberg's Moses and Aaron in the 1965–66 and 1966–67 seasons. In the mainstream repertoire, a highlight of the decade was Franco Zeffirelli's production of Tosca in 1964 with Callas, Renato Cioni and Gobbi. Among the guest conductors who appeared at Covent Garden during the 1960s were Otto Klemperer, Pierre Boulez, Claudio Abbado and Colin Davis. Guest singers included Jussi Björling, Mirella Freni, Sena Jurinac, Irmgard Seefried and Astrid Varnay.

The company made occasional appearances away from the Royal Opera House. Touring within Britain was limited to centres with large enough theatres to accommodate the company's productions, but in 1964 the company gave a concert performance of Otello at the Proms in London. Thereafter an annual appearance at the Proms was a regular feature of the company's schedule throughout the 1960s. In 1970, Solti led the company to Germany, where they gave Don Carlos, Falstaff and a new work by Richard Rodney Bennett. All but two of the principals were British. The public in Munich and Berlin were, according to the Frankfurter Allgemeine Zeitung, "beside themselves with enthusiasm". (Note: Within the UK, the company's last season away from London was in Manchester in 1983.)

In 1968, on the recommendation of the home secretary, James Callaghan, the queen conferred the title "The Royal Opera" on the company. It was the third stage company in the UK to be so honoured, following the Royal Ballet and the Royal Shakespeare Company.

=== 1970 to 1986 ===
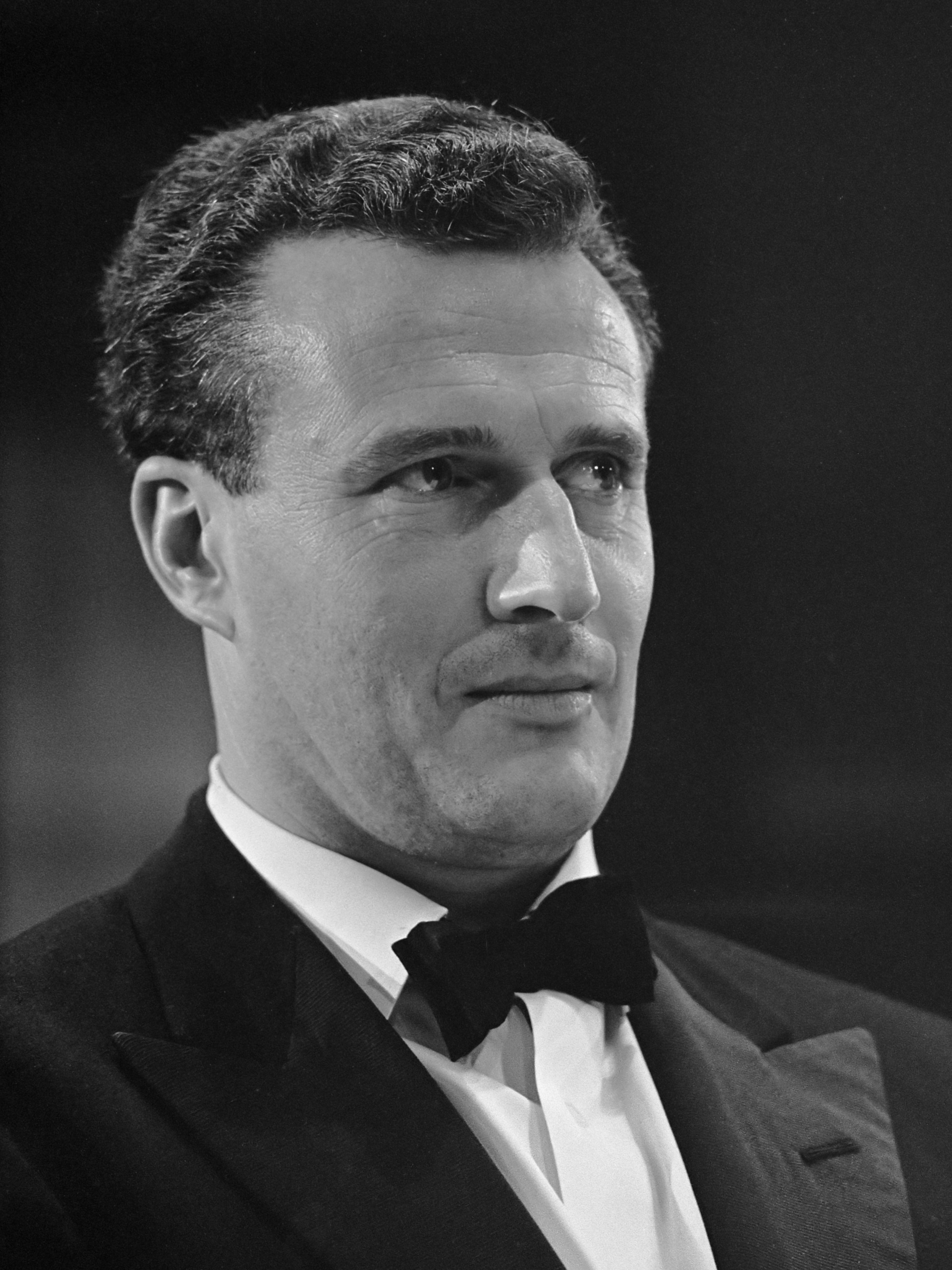
Colin Davis, musical director, 1971–86, photographed in 1967

Webster retired in June 1970. The music critic Charles Osborne wrote, "When he retired, he handed over to his successor an organization of which any opera house in the world might be proud. No memorial could be more appropriate". The successor was Webster's former assistant, John Tooley. One of Webster's last important decisions had been to recommend to the board that Colin Davis should be invited to take over as musical director when Solti left in 1971. It was announced in advance that Davis would work in tandem with Peter Hall, appointed director of productions. Peter Brook had briefly held that title in the company's early days, but in general the managerial structure of the opera company differed markedly from that of the ballet. The latter had always had its own director, subordinate to the chief executive of the opera house but with, in practice, a great degree of autonomy. The chief executive of the opera house and the musical director exercised considerably more day-to-day control over the opera company. Appointing a substantial theatrical figure such as Hall was an important departure. Hall, however, changed his mind, and did not take up the appointment, going instead to run the National Theatre. His defection, and the departure to Australian Opera of the staff conductor Edward Downes, a noted Verdi expert, left the company weakened on both production and musical sides.

Like his predecessors, Davis experienced hostility from sections of the audience in his early days in charge. His first production after taking over was a well-received Le nozze di Figaro, in which Kiri Te Kanawa achieved immediate stardom, but booing was heard at a "disastrous" Nabucco in 1971, and his conducting of Wagner's Ring was at first compared unfavourably with that of his predecessor. The Covent Garden board briefly considered replacing him, but was dissuaded by its chairman, Lord Drogheda. Davis's Mozart was generally admired; he received much praise for reviving the little-known La clemenza di Tito in 1974. Among his other successes were The Trojans and Benvenuto Cellini.

Under Davis, the opera house introduced promenade performances, giving, as Bernard Levin wrote, "an opportunity for those (particularly the young, of course) who could not normally afford the price of stalls tickets to sample the view from the posher quarters at the trifling cost of £3 and a willingness to sit on the floor". (Note: In current terms, £3 in 1973 was worth a little under £30 (in 2010), compared with a typical regular stalls ticket price between £100 and £200 (2011), depending on the opera and location within the stalls.) Davis conducted more than 30 operas during his 15-year tenure, but, he said, "people like [Lorin] Maazel, Abbado and [Riccardo] Muti would only come for new productions". Unlike Rankl, and like Solti, Davis wanted the world's best conductors to come to Covent Garden. He ceded the baton to guests for new productions including Der Rosenkavalier, Rigoletto and Aida. In The Times, John Higgins wrote, "One of the hallmarks of the Davis regime was the flood of international conductors who suddenly arrived at Covent Garden. While Davis has been in control perhaps only three big names have been missing from the roster: Karajan, Bernstein and Barenboim". Among the high-profile guests conducting Davis's company were Carlos Kleiber for performances of Der Rosenkavalier (1974), Elektra (1977), La bohème (1979) and Otello (1980), and Abbado conducting Un ballo in maschera (1975), starring Plácido Domingo and Katia Ricciarelli. In addition to the standard repertoire, Davis conducted such operas as Berg's Lulu and Wozzeck, Tippett's The Knot Garden and The Ice Break, and Alexander Zemlinsky's Der Zwerg and Eine florentinische Tragödie.

Among the star guest singers during the Davis years were the sopranos Montserrat Caballé and Leontyne Price, the tenors Carlo Bergonzi, Nicolai Gedda and Luciano Pavarotti and the bass Gottlob Frick. British singers appearing with the company included Janet Baker, Heather Harper, John Tomlinson and Richard Van Allan. Davis's tenure, at that time the longest in The Royal Opera's history, closed in July 1986 not with a gala, but, at his insistence, with a promenade performance of Fidelio with cheap admission prices.

=== 1987 to 2002 ===
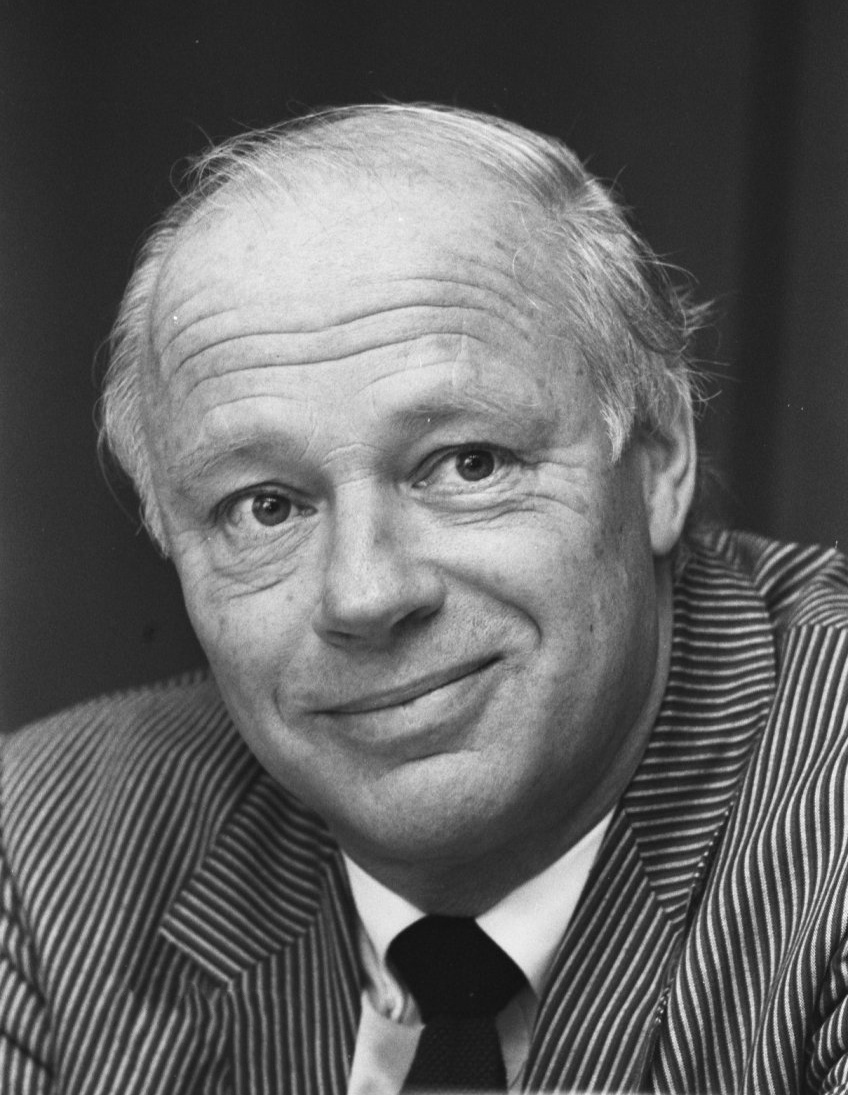
Bernard Haitink, music director 1985 to 2002

To succeed Davis, the Covent Garden board chose Bernard Haitink, who was then the musical director of the Glyndebourne Festival. He was highly regarded for the excellence of his performances, though his repertory was not large. In particular, he was not known as an interpreter of the Italian opera repertoire (he conducted no Puccini and only five Verdi works during his music directorship at Covent Garden). His tenure began well; a cycle of the Mozart Da Ponte operas directed by Johannes Schaaf was a success, and although a Ring cycle with the Russian director Yuri Lyubimov could not be completed, a substitute staging of the cycle directed by Götz Friedrich was well received. Musically and dramatically the company prospered into the 1990s. A 1993 production of Die Meistersinger, conducted by Haitink and starring John Tomlinson, Thomas Allen, Gösta Winbergh and Nancy Gustafson, was widely admired, as was Richard Eyre's 1994 staging of La traviata, conducted by Solti and propelling Angela Gheorghiu to stardom.

For some time, purely musical considerations were overshadowed by practical and managerial crises at the Royal Opera House. Sir John Tooley retired as general director in 1988, and his post was given to the television executive Jeremy Isaacs. Tooley later forsook his customary reticence and pronounced the Isaacs period a disaster, citing poor management that failed to control inflated manning levels – with a consequent steep rise in costs and ticket prices. The uneasy relations between Isaacs and his colleagues, notably Haitink, were also damaging. Tooley concluded that under Isaacs "Covent Garden had become a place of corporate entertainment, no longer a theatre primarily for opera and ballet lovers". Isaacs was widely blamed for the poor public relations arising from the 1996 BBC television series The House, in which cameras were permitted to film the day-to-day backstage life of the opera and ballet companies and the running of the theatre. (Note: Rodney Milnes outlined some of the episodes caught on camera: "the chief commissionaire's revelation of what goes on in the boxes is especially intriguing … A horse falls through the set of Katya Kabanova … Sackings are agreed while Carmen is stabbed on stage. A black family from south London attending a Hamlyn week reduced-price performance is spectacularly misdirected to cheap gallery slips by toffee-nosed ushers … corporate entertainment rampant, with sponsors boasting of the house's exclusivity and blithely unconcerned at the use of public money to make it so".) The Daily Telegraph commented, "For years, the Opera House was a byword for mismanagement and chaos. Its innermost workings were exposed to public ridicule by the BBC fly-on-the-wall series The House".

In 1995, The Royal Opera announced a "Verdi Festival", of which the driving force was the company's leading Verdian, Sir Edward Downes, by now returned from Australia. The aim was to present all Verdi's operas, either on stage or in concert performance, between 1995 and the centenary of Verdi's death, 2001. Those operas substantially rewritten by the composer in his long career, such as Simon Boccanegra, were given in both their original and revised versions. The festival did not manage to stage a complete Verdi cycle; the closure of the opera house disrupted many plans, but as The Guardian put it, "Downes still managed to introduce, either under his own baton or that of others, most of the major works and many of the minor ones by the Italian master."

The most disruptive event of the decade for both the opera and the ballet companies was the closure of the Royal Opera House between 1997 and 1999 for major rebuilding. The Independent on Sunday asserted that Isaacs "hopelessly mismanaged the closure of the Opera House during its redevelopment". Isaacs, the paper states, turned down the chance of a temporary move to the Lyceum Theatre almost next door to the opera house, pinning his hopes on a proposed new temporary building on London's South Bank. That scheme was refused planning permission, leaving the opera and ballet companies homeless. Isaacs resigned in December 1996, nine months before the expiry of his contract. Haitink, dismayed by events, threatened to leave, but was persuaded to stay and keep the opera company going in a series of temporary homes in London theatres and concert halls. A semi-staged Ring cycle at the Royal Albert Hall gained superlative reviews and won many new admirers for Haitink and the company, whose members included Tomlinson, Anne Evans and Hildegard Behrens. (Note: In the arts pages of the Financial Times, Andrew Clark wrote, "It played to the highest number of people that Wagner's tetralogy has probably ever witnessed at a single sitting. Tickets were sold out weeks in advance, with 20 per cent costing a mere £7.50 for each of the four evenings. The set, a narrow promontory in front of the orchestra, must have been the cheapest in Ring history. The all-black costumes can't have cost much either – and yet the performances pulsated with human drama".)

After Isaacs left, there was a period of managerial instability, with three chief executives in three years. Isaacs's successor, Genista McIntosh, resigned in May 1997 after five months, citing ill-health. Her post was filled by Mary Allen, who moved into the job from the Arts Council. Allen's selection did not comply with the council's rules for such appointments, and following a critical House of Commons Select committee report on the management of the opera house she resigned in March 1998, as did the entire board of the opera house, including the chairman, Lord Chadlington. A new board appointed Michael Kaiser as general director in September 1998. He oversaw the restoration of the two companies' finances and the re-opening of the opera house. He was widely regarded as a success, and there was some surprise when he left in June 2000 after less than two years to run the Kennedy Center in Washington, D.C.

The last operatic music to be heard in the old house had been the finale of Falstaff, conducted by Solti with the singers led by Bryn Terfel, in a joint opera and ballet farewell gala in July 1997. (Note: Solti, Davis and Haitink all conducted at this gala. The Verdi was the penultimate item on the programme. The gala closed with Darcey Bussell dancing on a bare stage, surrounded by both companies, as the Lilac Fairy symbolically putting the house to sleep at the end of Act I of The Sleeping Beauty.) When the house reopened in December 1999, magnificently restored, Falstaff was the opera given on the opening night, conducted by Haitink, once more with Terfel in the title role. (Note: The original plan had been to open with György Ligeti's Le Grand Macabre, but the necessary stage machinery was not ready in time, and the slightly-delayed season began with Falstaff.)

=== 2002 to date ===
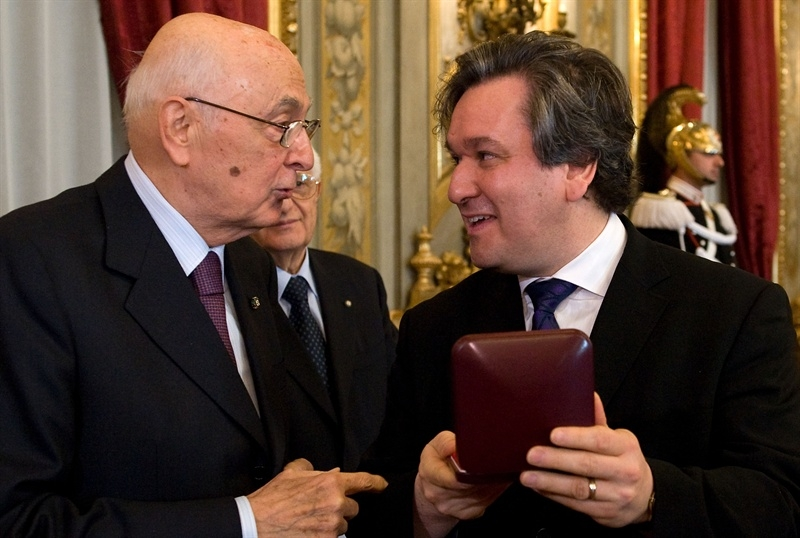
Antonio Pappano (right), music director since 2002, with the Italian president Giorgio Napolitano

Following years of disruption and conflict, stability was restored to the opera house and its two companies after the appointment in May 2001 of a new chief executive, Tony Hall, formerly a senior executive at the BBC. The following year Antonio Pappano succeeded Haitink as music director of The Royal Opera. Following the redevelopment, a second, smaller auditorium, the Linbury Studio Theatre has been made available for small-scale productions by The Royal Opera and The Royal Ballet, for visiting companies, and for work produced in the ROH2 programme, which supports new work and developing artists. The Royal Opera encourages young singers at the start of their careers with the Jette Parker Young Artists Programme; participants are salaried members of the company and receive daily coaching in all aspects of opera.

In addition to the standard works of the operatic repertoire, The Royal Opera has presented many less well known pieces since 2002, including Cilea's Adriana Lecouvreur, Massenet's Cendrillon, Prokofiev's The Gambler, Rimsky-Korsakov's The Tsar's Bride, Rossini's Il turco in Italia, Steffani's Niobe, and Tchaikovsky's The Tsarina's Slippers. Among the composers whose works were premiered were Thomas Adès, Harrison Birtwistle, Lorin Maazel, and Nicholas Maw.

Productions in the first five years of Pappano's tenure ranged from Shostakovich's Lady Macbeth of Mtsensk (2004) to Stephen Sondheim's Sweeney Todd (2003) starring Thomas Allen and Felicity Palmer. Pappano's Ring cycle, begun in 2004 and staged as a complete tetralogy in 2007, was praised like Haitink's before it for its musical excellence; it was staged in a production described by Richard Morrison in The Times as "much derided for mixing the homely … the wacky and the cosmic". During Pappano's tenure, his predecessors Davis and Haitink have both returned as guests. Haitink conducted Parsifal, with Tomlinson, Christopher Ventris and Petra Lang in 2007, and Davis conducted four Mozart operas between 2002 and 2011, Richard Strauss's Ariadne auf Naxos in 2007 and Humperdinck's Hansel and Gretel in 2008. In 2007, Sir Simon Rattle conducted a new production of Debussy's Pelléas et Mélisande starring Simon Keenlyside, Angelika Kirchschlager and Gerald Finley.

The company visited Japan in 2010, presenting a new production of Manon and the Eyre production of La traviata. While the main company was abroad, a smaller company remained in London, presenting Niobe, Così fan tutte and Don Pasquale at Covent Garden.

In 2010, the Royal Opera House received a government subsidy of just over £27m, compared with a subsidy of £15m in 1998. This sum was divided between the opera and ballet companies and the cost of running the building. Compared with opera houses in mainland Europe, Covent Garden's public subsidy has remained low as a percentage of its income – typically 43%, compared with 60% for its counterpart in Munich.

In the latter part of the 2000s, The Royal Opera gave an average of 150 performances each season, lasting from September to July, of about 20 operas, nearly half of which were new productions. Productions in the 2011–12 season included a new opera (Miss Fortune) by Judith Weir, and the first performances of The Trojans at Covent Garden since 1990, conducted by Pappano, and starring Bryan Hymel, Eva-Maria Westbroek and Anna Caterina Antonacci. From the start of the 2011–12 season Kasper Holten became Director of The Royal Opera, joined by John Fulljames as Associate Director of Opera. At the end of the 2011–12 season ROH2, the contemporary arm of the Royal Opera House, was closed. Responsibility for contemporary programming was split between the Studio programmes of The Royal Opera and The Royal Ballet.

Since the start of the 2012–13 season, The Royal Opera has continued to mount around 20 productions and around seven new productions each season. The 2012–13 season opened with a revival of Der Ring des Nibelungen, directed by Keith Warner; new productions that season included Robert le diable, directed by Laurent Pelly, Eugene Onegin, directed by Holten, La donna del lago, directed by Fulljames, and the UK premiere of Written on Skin, composed by George Benjamin and directed by Katie Mitchell. Productions by the Studio Programme included the world premiere of David Bruce's The Firework-Maker's Daughter (inspired by Philip Pullman's novel of the same name), directed by Fulljames, and the UK stage premiere of Gerald Barry's The Importance of Being Earnest, directed by Ramin Gray.

New productions in the 2013–14 season included Les vêpres siciliennes, directed by Stefan Herheim, Parsifal, directed by Stephen Langridge, Don Giovanni, directed by Holten, Die Frau ohne Schatten, directed by Claus Guth, and Manon Lescaut, directed by Jonathan Kent, and in the Studio Programme the world premiere of Luke Bedford's Through His Teeth, and the London premiere of Luca Francesconi's Quartett (directed by Fulljames). This season also saw the first production of a three-year collaboration between The Royal Opera and Welsh National Opera, staging Moses und Aron in 2014, Richard Ayre's Peter Pan in 2015 and a new commission in 2016 to celebrate WNO's 70th anniversary. Other events this season included The Royal Opera's first collaboration with Shakespeare's Globe, Holten directing L'Ormindo in the newly opened Sam Wanamaker Playhouse. In The Guardian, Tim Ashley wrote, "A more exquisite evening would be hard to imagine"; Dominic Dromgoole, director of the playhouse expressed the hope that the partnership with the Royal Opera would become an annual fixture. The production was revived in February 2015.

In March 2021, the ROH announced simultaneously the latest extension of Pappano's contract as its music director until the 2023-2024 season, and the scheduled conclusion of Pappano's tenure as ROH music director at the close of the 2023-2024 season.

Jakub Hrůša first guest-conducted at the ROH in February 2018, in a production of Carmen. He returned to the ROH in April 2022 to conduct a production of Lohengrin. In October 2022, the ROH announced the appointment of Hrůša as its next music director, effective in September 2025. He took the title of music director designate with immediate effect. Hrůša and Pappano are scheduled to share responsibilities in the 2024-2025 transition season.

From July to August 2024, Symphonic Horizons by Professor Brian Cox was performed at the ROH.

On February 11, 2025, the ROH premiered "Festen," a new opera composed by Mark-Anthony Turnage with a libretto by Lee Hall, nominated for Best New Opera Production at the Laurence Olivier Awards.

== Managerial and musical heads, 1946 to date ==
Royal Opera House Chief executive	Opera company Music Director	Director of Opera	Notes and references
1946–1970; David Webster	1946–1951; Karl Rankl	none	1946–1980 Chief executive titled "General Administrator"
1946–1970; David Webster	none	none	–
1946–1970; David Webster	1955–1958; Rafael Kubelík	none	–
1946–1970; David Webster	none	1959–1960; Lord Harewood	Harewood's title was "Controller of Opera Planning"
1946–1970; David Webster	none	1960–1962; Bernard Keeffe	Keeffe's title was "Controller of Opera Planning"
1946–1970; David Webster	1961–1971; Georg Solti	1960–1962; Bernard Keeffe	–
1946–1970; David Webster	1961–1971; Georg Solti	1962–1971; Joan Ingpen	Ingpen's title was "Controller of Opera Planning"
1970–1988; John Tooley	1961–1971; Georg Solti	1962–1971; Joan Ingpen	From 1980, Tooley's title was "General Director"
1970–1988; John Tooley	1971–1986; Colin Davis	none	–
1970–1988; John Tooley	1971–1986; Colin Davis	1973–1981; Helga Schmidt	Schmidt's title was first "Head of Opera Planning" then "Artistic Administrator"
1970–1988; John Tooley	1971–1986; Colin Davis	1983–1987; Peter Katona	Katona's title was "Artistic Administrator"; He is currently "Director of Casting"
1970–1988; John Tooley	1987–2002; Bernard Haitink	1987–1993; Paul Findlay	Since the 1980s, the title "Music Director" has been adopted in place of "Musical Director"; Findlay's title was "Opera Director"
1988–1996; Jeremy Isaacs	1987–2002; Bernard Haitink	1987–1993; Paul Findlay	Isaac's title was "General Director"
1988–1996; Jeremy Isaacs	1987–2002; Bernard Haitink	1993–1998; Nicholas Payne	Payne's title was "Opera Director"
January – May 1997; Genista McIntosh	1987–2002; Bernard Haitink	1993–1998; Nicholas Payne	McIntosh's title was "Chief executive"
September 1997 – March 1998; Mary Allen	1987–2002; Bernard Haitink	1993–1998; Nicholas Payne	Allen's title was "Chief executive"
September 1998 – June 2000; Michael Kaiser	1987–2002; Bernard Haitink	none	Kaiser's title was "Chief executive"
none	1987–2002; Bernard Haitink	2000–2011; Elaine Padmore	Padmore's title was "Director of Opera"
May 2001 – 2013; Tony Hall	1987–2002; Bernard Haitink	2000–2011; Elaine Padmore	Hall's title was "Chief executive"
May 2001 – 2013; Tony Hall	2002–2024; Antonio Pappano	2000–2011; Elaine Padmore	–
May 2001 – 2013; Tony Hall	2002–2024; Antonio Pappano	2011–2017; Kasper Holten	Holten's title was "Director of Opera"
2013–present Alex Beard	2002–2024; Antonio Pappano	2011–2017; Kasper Holten	Beard's title is "Chief executive"
2013–present Alex Beard	2002–2024; Antonio Pappano	2017–present Oliver Mears	Mears's title is "Director of Opera"
2013–present Alex Beard	2025–present Jakub Hrůša	2017–present Oliver Mears	

== See also ==
- Owners, lessees and managers of the Royal Opera House, Covent Garden
