= Powell Lloyd =

British opera singer

Harold Powell Lloyd (known as Powell Lloyd) (1900 – 1987) was an English operatic tenor and opera director and producer.

== Biography ==
Lloyd studied singing at Morley College and later with Amy Martin and Herbert Oliver. He began his career as an actor at the Old Vic in his early 20s, excelling in the plays of William Shakespeare. During this time he also sang in the opera chorus. In 1923 he began to appear as a soloist with Lilian Baylis's opera company at the Old Vic; mostly in buffo roles. While there he met his future wife, operatic mezzo-soprano Edith Coates. The couple married in 1933 and often performed together.

Lloyd remained with Baylis's company when they moved to the Sadler's Wells Theatre in 1931 and later became a producer and director for the company. Among the many roles he created on stage at Sadler's Wells were Bardolfo in Falstaff, Basilio in The Marriage of Figaro, Bobyl in The Snow Maiden, Goro in Madama Butterfly, Monostatos in The Magic Flute, Spoletta in Tosca, and Vašek in The Bartered Bride. He also had two major successes at the Royal Opera, London: the witch in Hänsel und Gretel (1934) and David in Die Meistersinger von Nürnberg (1936) under conductor Thomas Beecham. The latter role was recorded on Columbia Records.

Lloyd's career was put on hold while the London stages were closed during World War II. After the war he worked mainly as an opera director and producer. He worked for the Sadler's Wells Theatre, Theatre Scarborough, the Carl Rosa Opera Company, and the opera houses in Dublin and Johannesburg during the 1940s. In 1951, he directed Balfe's opera The Rose of Castille at the first Wexford Festival. In 1955 he joined the Welsh National Opera where he worked for a decade. He also was involved with producing works for radio and television broadcasts.
