= Karl Rankl =

British conductor and composer

Rankl circa 1950

Karl Rankl (1 October 1898 – 6 September 1968) was a British conductor and composer who was of Austrian birth. A pupil of the composers Schoenberg and Webern, he conducted at opera houses in Austria, Germany and Czechoslovakia until fleeing from the Nazis and taking refuge in England in 1939.

Rankl was appointed musical director of the newly formed Covent Garden Opera Company in 1946, and built it up from nothing to a level where it attracted some of the best known international opera singers as guest stars. By 1951, performances under guest conductors, such as Erich Kleiber and Sir Thomas Beecham were overshadowing Rankl's work, and he resigned. After five years as conductor of the Scottish National Orchestra, he was appointed musical director of the Elizabethan Theatre Trust's opera company, the forerunner of Opera Australia.

In his last years, Rankl concentrated on composing. Throughout his career he had written a series of symphonies and other works, including an opera. His symphonies were politely received, but did not enter the regular orchestral repertoire. The opera has never been performed.

== Life and career ==
=== Early years ===
Rankl was born in Gaaden, near Vienna, the fourteenth child of a peasant couple. He was educated in Vienna, and from 1918 studied composition there with Arnold Schoenberg and later with Anton Webern. With fellow students Hanns Eisler and Erwin Stein, Rankl arranged Bruckner's Symphony No 7 for Schoenberg's Society for Private Musical Performances in 1921, but the society closed down before it could be performed. Many years later, Rankl was invited by the composer to complete Schoenberg's oratorio Die Jakobsleiter but he declined the invitation.

Rankl's first professional post was as chorus master and répétiteur under Felix Weingartner at the Volksoper in Vienna in 1919, where he later became an assistant conductor. In 1923 he married Adele Jahoda (1903–1963). Over the next few years he held appointments in Liberec in 1925, Königsberg in 1927 and the Kroll Oper in Berlin where he was assistant to Otto Klemperer from 1928 to 1931. At the Kroll, Rankl strongly supported Klemperer's policy of promoting new music and radical productions. He was appointed principal conductor of the opera at Wiesbaden in 1931, but when the Nazis came to power in 1933, he had to leave Germany; his wife was Jewish, and Rankl's politics were strongly hostile to the Nazis. He moved back to Austria to head the opera at Graz in 1933, and in 1937 he was appointed principal conductor of the Neues Deutsches Theater in Prague. In 1939, once again displaced by the Nazis, Rankl fled Prague, and with the help of Sir Adrian Boult, head of music at the BBC, and Boult's assistant Kenneth Wright, he escaped to London.

In wartime Britain Rankl was unable to obtain a permit to work as a conductor until 1944, and he devoted much of his time to composition. His widow later recalled that Rankl also played the viola in a string quartet during this period. When he was eventually given the necessary work permit to resume his conducting career, Rankl conducted the Liverpool Philharmonic, BBC Northern and London Philharmonic Orchestras. He made a favourable impression; The Times praised his "boundless energy … clear-cut performance and with a strong feeling for the shapely line of a melody." William Glock in The Observer praised the "natural firmness" of his "splendid" and "authoritative" conducting of Beethoven. Among those whom Rankl impressed was David Webster, chairman of the Liverpool Philharmonic. In 1944, Webster was invited to set up a new opera company at the Royal Opera House, Covent Garden in London. He turned to Rankl for advice and soon decided to appoint him musical director of the fledgling company.

=== Covent Garden ===
Since 1939 there had been no opera or ballet at the Royal Opera House. Until the war, Covent Garden opera had consisted of privately sponsored seasons, principally in the summer months, with international stars, lavish productions, and a major symphony orchestra brought in to play in the orchestra pit. In 1944, the British government introduced a modest measure of state subsidy for the arts, and as part of this it established a Covent Garden Trust to present opera and ballet at the Royal Opera House. Webster successfully negotiated with Ninette de Valois to get her Sadler's Wells Ballet company to move its base to Covent Garden, but he had to build up an opera company from scratch. He initially approached famous conductors including Bruno Walter and Eugene Goossens, but found them unwilling to accommodate themselves to the new brief of the Covent Garden opera company: to present opera in English, with a permanent company, all year round on a very tight budget.

Rankl was on the verge of going to Australia in response to an invitation from the Australian Broadcasting Corporation to conduct a 13-week season of 20 concerts. He and the corporation were unable to agree terms, and in April 1946, he accepted the Covent Garden post. His appointment immediately caused controversy in musical circles. To those who hankered after the glamour of the pre-war seasons he was a minor figure among international maestros. Among those outraged by Rankl's appointment was Sir Thomas Beecham, who had been in control of Covent Garden for much of the period from 1910 to 1939, and was furious at being excluded under the new regime. He publicly stated that the appointment of an alien, especially one bearing a German name was the "mystery of mysteries", and called the Covent Garden trustees a "hapless set of ignoramuses and nitwits". Webster, however, realised that what the new Covent Garden company needed at this stage in its existence was not a star conductor but one of those who, in the words of the critic Desmond Shawe-Taylor "know the whole complex business of opera inside out, and retain in their blood the pre-war standards of a good continental opera house." A biographer of Webster has written that under Rankl, "amazing progress" was made. He assembled and trained an orchestra and a chorus. He recruited and trained musical assistants.

Having recruited and trained a largely British company of singers, Rankl, with Webster's strong support, persuaded international singers including Elisabeth Schwarzkopf, Ljuba Welitsch, Hans Hotter and Paolo Silveri to appear with the company, singing in English. The company performed a wide repertory of German, Italian, Russian and English opera. It made its debut in January 1947 with Carmen, in a performance greeted by The Times as "worthy of the stage on which it appeared ... It revealed in Mr. Karl Rankl a musical director who knew how to conduct opera." The company, headed by Edith Coates and including Dennis Noble, Grahame Clifford, David Franklin and Constance Shacklock, was warmly praised. In the next two operas presented by the company, Rankl was thought a little stolid in The Magic Flute, but was praised for "weaving Strauss's flexible rhythms" in Der Rosenkavalier. Rankl tackled the Italian repertoire, and new English works, winning praise for his Rigoletto, though with Peter Grimes he was compared to his disadvantage with the original conductor, Reginald Goodall. A production of The Masteringers with Hotter as Sachs was judged "a further stage in the consolidation of the Covent Garden company". Despite the good notices for his early seasons, Rankl had to cope with a vociferous public campaign by Beecham against the very idea of establishing a company of British artists; Beecham maintained that the British could not sing opera, and had produced only half a dozen first rate operatic artists in the past 60 years.

In the next three years, Rankl built the company up, reluctantly casting foreign stars when no suitable British singer could be found, and resisting attempts by Webster to invite eminent guest conductors. When Webster and the Covent Garden board insisted, Rankl took it badly that star conductors such as Erich Kleiber, Clemens Krauss and Beecham were brought into "his" opera house. In a biographical article in the Grove Dictionary of Music and Musicians, the critic Frank Howes wrote of Rankl: "By 1951 he had made the Covent Garden Company a going concern, but had also revealed, notably in his 1950 performances of the Ring, his limitations as a conductor – he was considered difficult with singers, orchestras and producers." Rankl was also difficult in his relations with the Opera House's director of productions, Peter Brook, who left after two years. Critics and operagoers did not fail to notice the difference in standards between performances under Rankl and under the guests. Rankl resigned in May 1951, and conducted for the last time at the Royal Opera House on 30 June. The work was Tristan und Isolde with Kirsten Flagstad; as it was announced in advance that this would be her last appearance in the role of Isolde and her farewell performance at Covent Garden, the fact that it was also Rankl's farewell received little attention. He was never invited to conduct there again, and did not set foot in the building for another 14 years, until 1965 for the first night of Moses und Aron by his old teacher, Schoenberg; the conductor then was Georg Solti. After the end of the 1951 London season, Rankl conducted the Covent Garden company on tour; his final performance with the company was Der Rosenkavalier in Liverpool on 27 July 1951.

=== Later years ===
In 1952, Rankl was appointed conductor of the Scottish National Orchestra, in succession to Walter Susskind. He held the post for five years, and gained good notices. In 1953, Neville Cardus wrote that Rankl and his orchestra held their own even when compared against Wilhelm Furtwängler and the Vienna Philharmonic, when both orchestras played at that year's Edinburgh Festival. Rankl was praised for enterprising programming, presenting the then-unknown early work of Schoenberg Gurrelieder at the 1954 Edinburgh Festival, and Mahler's Fifth Symphony, also then a rarity, at the same festival. Cardus also praised Rankl's conducting of Bruckner as "grand and comprehensive … of rare quality".

In December 1957, Rankl was appointed musical director of the Elizabethan Trust Opera Company in Australia. In his first season, he conducted Carmen, Peter Grimes, Fidelio, Lohengrin and The Barber of Seville. He conducted the company at the inaugural Adelaide Festival in 1960, in Richard Strauss's Salome and Puccini's Il trittico.

Towards the end of his life, Rankl retired to St. Gilgen, near Salzburg in Austria. He died there at the age of 69.

== Compositions and recordings ==
As a composer, Rankl wrote eight symphonies (1938, 1941, 1944, 1953, 1954, 1961, 1962, 1963), a string quartet, and 60 songs. He also wrote an opera, Deirdre of the Sorrows (based on J.M. Synge's play), which won one of the prizes offered by the Arts Council for the Festival of Britain in 1951. The opera has never been performed (other than the broadcast of short extracts). Rankl extracted a suite for large orchestra from the score in 1956. His reputation today lies almost entirely on his work as a conductor, and little of his music has ever been published. The few recordings (broadcast and commercial) of his own music include:

- Deirdre of the Sorrows. Extracts broadcast in 'The Quest for Deidrie', BBC Radio 3, 31 October 1995
- Seven Songs for Baritone, op 6 (1939–42). One song: No 6 'The Whim', on Continental Britons - The Émigré Composers, Nimbus NI5730 (2004)
- Sonata Concertante for double bass and piano (1957), on 'The Music of Bosch, Rankl, Sprongl, Hindemith', Meridien CDE 84626 (2015)
- Suite for Strings (1953). Recorded by the BBC Symphony Orchestra. Broadcast 14 November 1953.
- Symphony No 1 (1938). First broadcast performance by the BBC Symphony Orchestra under Karl Rankl, on 18 March 1953.
- Symphony No 5 (1954). First broadcast performance by the Scottish National Orchestra under Karl Rankl, on 10 May 1957.
- War: Eleven Songs for Baritone, op 10 (1939–42). Two songs: No 4, 'They' and No 5, 'Bohmisches Rekrutenlied' on Continental Britons - The Émigré Composers, Nimbus NI5730 (2004)
- (with Hans Eisler and Erwin Stein): arrangement of Bruckner's Symphony No 7 for chamber ensemble. Capriccio C10864 (2002)

Rankl made few recordings for the gramophone. In the late 1940s, for Decca he conducted Beethoven's First Symphony, Schubert's Fourth Symphony, Brahms's Fourth Symphony and Dvořák's New World Symphony; Dvořák's Cello Concerto (with Maurice Gendron) and Violin Concerto (with Ida Haendel); a Bach Cantata (Schlage Doch, BWV 53) and overtures and other shorter pieces by Beethoven, Cimarosa, Dvořák, Rossini, Smetana, Richard Strauss, Wagner and Weber.

Rankl recorded excerpts from the operatic repertory with the bass-baritone Paul Schöffler in Sarastro's arias from Die Zauberflöte, the "Wahnmonolog" from Die Meistersinger, the closing scene of Die Walküre, and Iago's arias from Otello. With his Covent Garden chorus and orchestra he recorded choruses from Die Zauberflöte, Rigoletto, Carmen, Il trovatore and Pagliacci, though only the first two of the five were released on disc.

== Notes ==
Preceded by none	Music Director, Royal Opera House, Covent Garden; 1946–1951	Succeeded by Rafael Kubelík
