= Edith Coates =

English operatic mezzo-soprano

Coates in one of her key roles, the Countess in The Queen of Spades

Edith Mary Coates OBE (31 May 1905 – 7 January 1983) was an English operatic mezzo-soprano. After studying in London at Trinity College of Music she joined Lilian Baylis's theatre company at the Old Vic in 1924 and then became a chorus member of Baylis's opera company. By the time the latter moved to Sadler's Wells Theatre in 1931 Coates had become its principal mezzo-soprano, and she sang in a wide range of roles, in the Italian, French, German, Russian and other repertoires.

During the Second World War, during which Sadler's Wells was closed, Coates joined colleagues from the opera company taking small-scale productions around Britain, sometimes appearing in cities, and sometimes in remote places where opera had never been staged before. After the war she created the role of Auntie in Peter Grimes at Sadler's Wells before joining a new company − eventually known as The Royal Opera − at the Royal Opera House, Covent Garden, appearing in numerous roles, between 1947 and 1967, ranging from the standard opera repertory to world premieres.

Known for her acting ability, Coates played a wide variety of characters, from comic to dramatic. Among her most celebrated parts were the title role in Carmen and the Countess in The Queen of Spades, as well as roles in Wagner, Strauss and Berg operas. She made occasional appearances away from the operatic stage, including her portrayal of the Old Lady in the British premiere of Candide in 1959.

== Life and career ==
=== Early years ===
Coates was born in Lincoln on 31 May 1905, the youngest child and second daughter of Percy Coates, a merchant and commercial traveller, and his wife Eleanor, née Allen. She studied at a church school in Lincoln before winning a scholarship to Trinity College of Music in London, at the age of thirteen. There she studied singing with Ethel Henry Bird and later studied privately with Clive Carey, Dawson Freer and Dino Borgioli.

Coates began her stage career in 1924, playing one of Titania's fairy attendants in A Midsummer Night's Dream with Lilian Baylis's Old Vic company. Baylis ran an opera company in tandem with her Shakespeare productions, and Coates sang in the chorus and was soon given small solo roles, beginning with Giovanna in Rigoletto. Later parts included Lazarillo in Maritana, Frédéric in Mignon, and Siébel in Faust. The Daily Telegraph commented on her "beautiful deep contralto" as Siébel, and The Times praised her "promising contralto" as Frédéric. She moved up to bigger roles such as Azucena in Il trovatore and the Queen of the Gipsies in The Bohemian Girl, which remained part of her repertoire at Baylis's Sadler's Wells Theatre and later at Covent Garden.

When the opera company moved from the Old Vic to Sadler's Wells in 1931 Coates was its leading mezzo-soprano. In the German repertoire she sang Ortrud in Lohengrin and Marcellina in The Marriage of Figaro; her roles in French operas included Delilah in Samson et Dalila and the title role in Carmen; and in Italian operas she played Amneris in Aïda, Ulrica in Un ballo in maschera and Maddalena in Rigoletto. She sang Lel and Tkachikha in the British premieres of Rimsky-Korsakov's The Snow Maiden and The Tale of Tsar Saltan. In 1933 she married her fellow company member, the tenor (and later designer and director) Powell Lloyd. The marriage was lifelong and childless.

In 1936 Coates made her Covent Garden debut, in Hänsel und Gretel, as an emergency replacement when the singer cast as the children's mother was taken ill; Coates had been singing the same role (in English) at a matinée performance at Sadler's Wells, and hastened into the West End to sing the part for the evening performance at Covent Garden, in which the rest of the cast sang in German. She appeared there again the following year in Wagner's Ring cycle, conducted by Wilhelm Furtwängler, but she did not become a regular member of the Covent Garden company until a decade later. At Sadler's Wells she appeared as Eboli in Verdi's Don Carlos in 1938, in the first production of the opera given in English.

During the Second World War Sadler's Wells was closed. Coates and her husband joined Joan Cross (soprano), Lawrance Collingwood (conductor) and sixteen others, including an orchestra of five players, taking scaled-down productions throughout Britain, sometimes playing in large cities and sometimes in remote locations where opera had never been seen before. With this small troupe Coates made her Scottish début as Flora in La traviata in 1941, and appeared in operas including Die Zauberflöte, Gianni Schicchi, Il barbiere di Siviglia, Il tabarro, Madama Butterfly and Rigoletto.

=== Post-war ===
When Sadler's Wells reopened in June 1945 Coates was a member of the original cast of Britten's Peter Grimes, creating the role of Auntie, the down-to-earth landlady of the village pub. She later played the role at the Paris Opéra and La Monnaie.

In 1946 David Webster established a permanent opera company at Covent Garden. Coates headed the cast, in the title role of its inaugural production, Carmen, on 14 January 1947. (Note: Members of the new opera company had joined forces with the Sadler's Wells Ballet for the post-war reopening of the Royal Opera House in Purcell's semi-opera The Fairy-Queen the previous month (12 December 1946), but Carmen was the opera company's first production of its own. Also in the cast were Kenneth Neate, Dennis Noble, Muriel Rae, David Franklin, Grahame Clifford, Audrey Bowman and Constance Shacklock.) The Times said she had put "polish and power" into her performance since singing the role at Sadler's Wells, and "dominated the stage whenever she was on it".

In the late 1940s and early 1950s Coates played numerous important roles at Covent Garden. She appeared as Fricka to Hans Hotter's Wotan in Das Rheingold, both Fricka and Waltraute in Die Walküre, and Waltraute in Götterdämmerung to Kirsten Flagstad's Brünnhilde. In the non-Wagnerian repertory she played Marcellina in The Marriage of Figaro to the Susanna of Elisabeth Schwarzkopf, Herodias to Astrid Varnay's Salome, and Klytemnestra in Elektra, conducted by Erich Kleiber in 1953. The Stage commented:

It can be said of few operatic singers that they make their personality felt by their mere presence on the stage. But nobody who has seen Edith Coates can fail to be impressed by the remarkable manner in which every role she fills is stamped indelibly in a few moments, not only by the imposing richness of her mezzo-soprano voice but by her instinctive stage sense and high dramatic ability. … Few will forget the tremendous impression of sinister force she made as Klytemnestra in Elektra or in the totally contrasting rôle of Margret in the English premiere of Wozzeck. But perhaps her outstanding impersonation is that of the formidable old Countess in The Queen of Spades, in which she gave a magnificent performance.

The critic Desmond Shawe-Taylor wrote of her performance as the Countess, "Since the days of Chaliapine I cannot remember a more sinister death scene on the operatic stage". Dame Edith Evans, who had played the role in a non-musical film adaptation of Pushkin's story, complimented Coates on her moving performance.

When Covent Garden staged Peter Grimes in 1947, Coates again played Auntie. She created roles in several world premieres, including Madame Bardeau in Bliss's The Olympians (1949), the Housewife in Britten's Gloriana (1953), and the She-Ancient in Tippett's The Midsummer Marriage (1955).

=== Later years ===
Away from Covent Garden, Coates took part in the 1958 Hoffnung Interplanetary Music Festival at the Royal Festival Hall, joining Owen Brannigan, Ian Wallace, Otakar Kraus and others in Franz Reizenstein's spoof, Let's Fake an Opera. The following year she appeared in the first British production of Leonard Bernstein's Candide at the Saville Theatre, playing the Old Lady. The Stage commented on her "earthy, uninhibited study of the old procuress". Another reviewer wrote, "The large cast is quite exceptional, especially Edith Coates as the Old Lady, who is in her element here, being allowed to sing and to act with real gusto".

Coates played Grandma in the world premiere of Grace Williams's The Parlour given by the Welsh National Opera (WNO) in 1966. The Stage praised her "wickedly, gleefully funny" performance. Her last Covent Garden performance was on 24 June 1967, as the Duchess of Crakentorp in La Fille du régiment with Joan Sutherland and Luciano Pavarotti in the romantic lead roles. The Times noted that Coates's entry "drew an ovation". In 1970, for English National Opera at the London Coliseum, she again played the Countess in The Queen of Spades. In The Times William Mann called her performance "even more riveting, more finely pointed" than the one that had held Covent Garden audiences "spellbound" nearly twenty years earlier. Her last appearance on the operatic stage was for WNO as the Hostess in Boris Godunov in 1971, and in 1972 she was seen on BBC television in the character role of Inez in The Gondoliers. She was appointed OBE in 1977.

Coates died at Worthing Hospital, Sussex, of heart failure on 7 January 1983, aged 74. Her widower survived her, living until 1987.

== Broadcasts and recordings ==
=== Broadcasts ===
Coates was a frequent broadcaster. She first sang on BBC radio in 1927 and last sang on BBC television in 1972. She took part in more than forty broadcasts of complete operas or oratorios as well as numerous operatic excerpts. The former were broadcast between 1934 and 1972:

Work	Role	Year
Cavalleria Rusticana	Lola	1934
Il tabarro	La Frugola	1937 and 1944
Aida	Amneris	1937, 1941 and 1944
The Snow Maiden	Lehl	1938
Dido and Aeneas	Dido	1941
The Beggar's Opera	Lucy	1941
Rigoletto	Maddalena	1942
The Magic Flute	Third Lady	1942
Ruddigore	Mad Margaret	1942
The Lily of Killarney	Mrs Cregan	1942 and 1951
Madama Butterfly	Suzuki	1943
Merrie England	Jill-all-Alone	1943
The Gypsy Baron	Czipra	1944
Carmen	Carmen	1944
The Marriage of Figaro	Marcellina	1944
The Beggar's Opera	Mrs Peachum	1945
Peter Grimes	Auntie	1945 and 1949
The Tale of Tsar Saltan	Tkachikha	1945
Saul	The Witch of Endor	1947
The Duenna	The Duenna	1949
The Olympians	Madame Bardeau	1949
Lohengrin	Ortrud	1950
Die Walküre	Waltraute	1950 and 1955
Götterdämmerung	Waltraute	1950 and 1957
Dido and Aeneas	Sorcereress	1951
The Bohemian Girl	The Gypsy Queen	1951
Die Walküre	Fricka	1951
The Perfect Fool	The Mother	1951
Gloriana	Housewife	1953
Jenůfa	Grandmother Buryjovka	1954
Káťa Kabanová	Kabanicha	1954
The Midsummer Marriage	The She-Ancient	1955
The Bartered Bride	Hata	1955
The Golden Cockerel	The Housekeeper	1956
Mañana	The Widow	1956
The Fiery Angel	The Hostess	1959
Iolanthe	The Fairy Queen	1962
The Beggar's Opera	Mrs Trapes	1963
The Gondoliers	Inez	1972

Source: BBC Genome.

=== Recordings ===
Coates made few commercial audio recordings, and at 2022 only one of her performances has been released in video form, namely the 1963 BBC television recording of The Beggar's Opera, listed above.

Audio recordings featuring Coates are listed in WorldCat as:

Opera	Role	Ref
The Midsummer Marriage	She-Ancient	
The Beggar's Opera	Mrs Coaxer	
Dido and Aeneas	Sorceress	
Die Walküre	Waltraute	
La fille du régiment	Duchesse de Crakentorp	
Boris Godunov	Hostess	

== Notes, references and sources ==
=== Sources ===
- Davidson, Gladys (1955). A Treasury of Opera Biography. New York: Citadel Press. OCLC 1036898460.
- Gilbert, Susie (2009). Opera for Everybody. London: Faber and Faber. ISBN 978-0-571-22493-7.
- Haltrecht, Montague (1975). The Quiet Showman: Sir David Webster and the Royal Opera House. London: Collins. ISBN 0-00-211163-2.
