= Eva Turner =

English dramatic soprano

Dame Eva Turner DBE
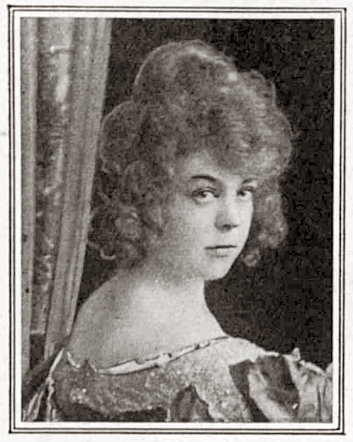
- As prima donna of the Carl Rosa Opera Company, 1923
- Born: 10 March 1892; Werneth, Oldham, Lancashire, England
- Died: 16 June 1990 (aged 98); Devonshire Hospital, London, England
- Education: Royal Academy of Music
- Occupations: Singer, voice teacher

Dame Eva Turner DBE (10 March 1892 – 16 June 1990) was an English dramatic soprano. Determined from an early age to become an opera singer, she studied at the Royal Academy of Music in London and then joined the chorus of the Carl Rosa Opera Company. She was allotted increasingly important solo roles, and by 1920 was the company's prima donna.

Talent spotted by an assistant to Arturo Toscanini, musical director of La Scala, Milan, Turner was engaged to sing there in 1924, and then had an international career in Continental Europe, North and South America and at Covent Garden. She sang in a wide range of operas, including those of Wagner and Verdi, but was known above all for her performances in the title role of Puccini's Turandot.

From the late 1940s, Turner was a voice teacher, first in the US and then in Britain. Among her pupils were Amy Shuard, Rita Hunter and Linda Esther Gray.

== Life and career ==
=== Early years ===
Eva Turner was born on 10 March 1892 in Werneth, Oldham, the elder child and only daughter of Charles Turner, chief engineer of a cotton mill, and his wife, Elizabeth, née Park. She attended Werneth council school until she was ten, when the family moved to Bristol.

In Bristol, Turner was taken to her first opera, Il trovatore, performed by the Carl Rosa Company in 1903. She decided that she wished to make opera her career, and was supported by her parents, who paid for her to take lessons with the bass Daniel Rootham, who had been teacher to Clara Butt. At the age of nineteen Turner started a four-year course at the Royal Academy of Music, where she sang in Sir Alexander Mackenzie's opera The Cricket on the Hearth. While a student she was briefly betrothed, but the wedding did not take place, and she never married.

Towards the end of her time at the academy Turner auditioned for Walter van Noorden, proprietor and conductor of the opera company that had fired her imagination in Bristol. He offered her a place in the chorus, with the prospect of promotion to solo parts. She began to study with Albert Richards-Broad, who had recently joined the management of the Carl Rosa Company. He had sung as a bass under Hans Richter at Covent Garden, and was an authority on voice production. He remained her coach, adviser and friend until his death, twenty-five years later.

Over the next five years Turner was allotted increasingly important roles as her voice gained weight and power. In 1920 the company gave a four-week season at Covent Garden, in which she sang Santuzza (Cavalleria rusticana), Musetta (La bohème), Leonora (Il trovatore), Butterfly (Madama Butterfly), Antonia (The Tales of Hoffmann), and Venus (Tannhäuser). The Times described her Leonora as promising although needing to be sung more freely, The Stage praised her vivacity as Musetta, and The Era found her Santuzza "remarkable" and "brilliant". The following year the company returned to Covent Garden for a seven-week season, during which Turner sang all her 1920 roles and added Fricka in Das Rheingold, Brünnhilde in Die Walküre and Siegfried, Elsa in Lohengrin, the title-role in Aida and Jeanette in a short-lived one-act piece called Le chant fatal.

=== International career ===
Nowadays British opera singers appear with gratifying frequency in leading houses all over the world. Between the two world wars there was only one of whom that could be said – Eva Turner

— Nigel Douglas, Legendary Voices (1993)

Further London seasons followed, between provincial tours. In 1924 the Carl Rosa Company was in the West End for a four-week season, which became a turning point in Turner's career. Her performance as Butterfly impressed Ettore Panizza, Arturo Toscanini's assistant at La Scala, Milan. Panizza arranged for her to sing for Toscanini, who declared, "Bella voce, bella pronuncia, bella figura", (Note: "Beautiful voice, beautiful pronunciation, beautiful figure") and offered her the roles of Freia in Das Rheingold and Sieglinde in Die Walküre in La Scala's forthcoming season. The Carl Rosa management released her from her contract to allow her to begin an international career. Her last appearance with the Carl Rosa Company was in Bristol, where she had seen her first opera twenty-three years previously.

After the La Scala season, Turner joined another Italian company touring Germany. As her international career progressed she appeared in opera houses around Italy, in other European countries and in North and South America. She had a villa built to her own design in Brusino Arsizio on Lake Lugano, where she based herself when performing in Italy. As English opera singers were not at that time highly regarded internationally it was suggested to Turner that she might change her name, but as her biographer Sir John Tooley comments, "Proud of her Lancastrian roots, she refused".

Although she was celebrated for her Aida, the part with which Turner became most closely identified was the title role in Puccini's Turandot. Franco Alfano, who completed the opera after Puccini's death, considered her the ideal singer of the part. She was in the audience for the premiere at La Scala in April 1926 and first sang the part in December of that year at the Teatro Grande in Brescia. In 1928 she performed the role at Covent Garden (also playing Aida and Santuzza during the season). The Times and The Musical Times both expressed reservations about the opera but praised Turner's performance. The latter reported:

She let loose again and again a stream of tone brilliant as a trumpet's, without a tremor or a shade of uncertainty. It was marvellous singing; an achievement comparable with the fiddling of a Heifetz … it is unlikely that in that part any soprano in the world can match her.

In 1929 she took the part at La Scala. Recordings of her Turandot recorded live at Covent Garden in 1937 with Giovanni Martinelli as Calaf and John Barbirolli conducting remained unissued at the time but were released on CD in the 1980s.

In 1938 Turner was among the sixteen leading singers of the day for whom Ralph Vaughan Williams composed his Serenade to Music, honouring the conductor Sir Henry Wood. Each singer had his or her own solo in between singing together. A recording of the work, conducted by Wood immediately after the premiere, captures Turner's voice in what the musical scholar Christopher Palmer calls "the great soaring solo 'How many things by season season'd are to their right praise and true perfection!'".

When the Second World War began on 3 September 1939 Turner was at Brusino Arsizio, from where she crossed into Switzerland and made her way to England, determined to appear as contracted at Wood's Covent Garden concert on 25 September. On Mussolini's declaration of war on 10 June 1940, she was interned in a camp in Southern Italy and repatriated after 3 months. She spent the rest of the war years singing in concerts for the armed forces and the radio, and at the Proms. She declined invitations to work in America.

During the war there was no opera at Covent Garden. When peace came, it was decided to abandon the pre-war practice of starry internationally cast seasons in favour of a resident company performing year-round and singing in English. This was a controversial decision, and the fledgling company of largely unknown singers received a considerable boost when Turner accepted an invitation from the director of the company, David Webster, to sing in Turandot, for which she learned the role in English translation. Webster's biographer Montague Haltrecht writes:

… to Webster she represented the level of achievement he was aiming at. He watched the faces of his young artists as they listened to her huge voice, which was still capable of rolling thrillingly round his theatre. They turned awe-struck to look at the rather short figure in their midst from whom it came. She was warm, friendly, encouraging. Yes, she represented their level of aspiration. Just as Webster had wanted.

The critic in The Daily Telegraph said that Turner astonished the entire audience. In the company's first two seasons she sang Turandot fourteen times in London and another fourteen on tour.

=== Later years ===
At that point Turner had no intention of retiring from the stage, but in 1949 she received an invitation from the University of Oklahoma to undertake a year's professorship. Gradually the one year extended into ten. After that she returned to London to teach at her alma mater, the Royal Academy of Music, and privately. Among those who studied with her in the US and England were Roberta Knie, Amy Shuard, Rita Hunter, Linda Esther Gray, Pauline Tinsley and Eric Garrett. Tooley writes that Turner passed on "her wealth of experience with her inimitable generosity but also with a ferocious expectation of hard work and high standards in return". In the 1980s, Gwyneth Jones studied the role of Turandot with her and remained a devoted friend throughout Turner's last years.

Turner's ninetieth birthday was celebrated with a gala at Covent Garden, which included contributions, some spoken, some sung, by Geraint Evans, Tito Gobbi, Ljuba Welitsch, Victoria de los Angeles, Isobel Baillie, John Gielgud and several star singers of the younger generation, including Valerie Masterson, John Tomlinson and Hinge and Bracket.

She died in London on 16 June 1990 at the age of 98. A memorial service was held in Westminster Abbey.

== Honours ==
Turner was appointed a Dame Commander of the Order of the British Empire (DBE) in 1962. She received fellowships or honorary memberships of the Guildhall School of Music and Drama (1968), the Royal College of Music (1974), the Royal Northern College of Music (1978), Trinity College, London (1982) and St. Hilda's College, Oxford (1984) and honorary degrees from the universities of Manchester (1979) and Oxford (1984). In 1982 she was made an honorary citizen of the State of Oklahoma, and a first freeman of the Metropolitan Borough of Oldham.

== Notes, references and sources ==
=== Sources ===
- Cummings, David, ed. (1990). International Who's Who in Music (12th ed.). Cambridge: Melrose Press. ISBN 978-0-94-887520-5.
- Douglas, Nigel (1993). Legendary Voices. London: Deutsch. ISBN 978-0-23-398847-4.
- Haltrecht, Montague (1975). The Quiet Showman – Sir David Webster and the Royal Opera House. London: Collins. ISBN 978-0-00-211163-8.
