= Pauline Tinsley =

British opera singer (1928–2021)

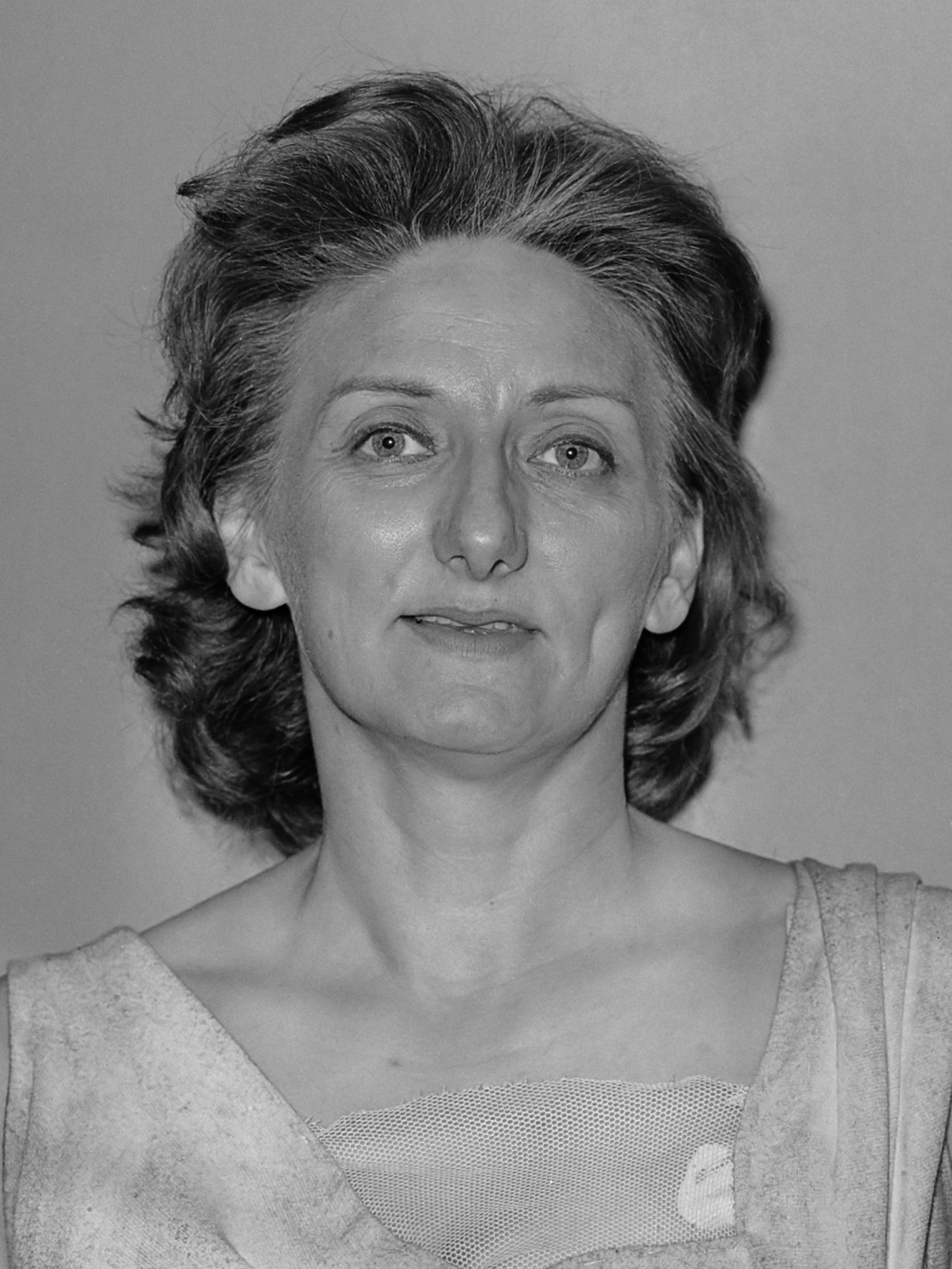
Pauline Tinsley (1973)

Pauline Cecilia Tinsley (27 March 1928 – 10 May 2021) was a British soprano, notable for her performances for the Welsh National Opera (1962–1972, 1975–1981) and the English National Opera (1963–1974).

== Biography ==
Tinsley was born in Wigan, near Manchester in March 1928 and studied at the Northern School of Music with Margaret Dillon and Ellis Keeler, and then in London with Joan Cross, Dame Eva Turner and Roy Henderson. Her debut was in 1961 as Desdemona in Rossini's Otello with the Philopera Company at St. Pancras Town Hall, London, and she also sang leading roles in early Verdi and Wagner operas with that company. She appeared as Susanna in The Marriage of Figaro for her debut with the Welsh National Opera in 1962. This was followed by her first appearance with the English National Opera (then Sadler's Wells Opera) as Gilda in Verdi's Rigoletto in 1963.

In 1965, she became a member of The Royal Opera, Covent Garden, where she appeared as the Kostelnička in Jenůfa by Janáček, the title roles of Elektra and Tosca and in other leading roles. Tinsley also sang at Glyndebourne Festival Opera, the New York City Opera, in Hamburg, Zűrich, Vancouver, Houston, and Santa Fe. She was prized for her compelling dramatic presence and her easily heard, untiring voice. She sang Public Opinion in the 1983 BBC television production of Orpheus in the Underworld.

Tinsley died on 10 May 2021, aged 93. Her marriage to George Neighbour produced two children, John and Julia. Her children survive her.
