= Roberta Knie =

American opera singer

Roberta Knie (13 March 1938 – 16 March 2017) was an American dramatic soprano who had a prominent opera career in the United States and Europe that spanned from the mid-1960s through the early 1980s. Possessing a strong and clear timbre, Knie became particularly known for her interpretations of the works of Richard Wagner.

== Career ==
A native of Cordell, Oklahoma, Knie studied at University of Oklahoma under Elisabeth Parham, Judy Bounds Coleman and the famous Eva Turner. She moved to Germany to study with Max Lorenz for a short period before making her professional opera debut in 1964 at the Hagen Theatre as Elisabeth in Wagner's Tannhäuser. She joined the Stadttheater Freiburg in 1966 where she sang roles for three years.

In 1969 she joined Graz Opera, singing there for three seasons in such roles as Leonore in Beethoven's Fidelio and the title roles in Richard Strauss's Salome and Puccini's Tosca. From 1972-73 she sang with the Oper der Stadt Köln and at the Opernhaus Zürich. The year 1974 proved to be a milestone in Knie's career. She replaced an ailing singer at the last minute in the role of Brünnhilde in Wagner's Ring Cycle at the Bayreuth Festspielhaus. Her performance was hailed by audience and critics alike and her profile as an opera singer was significantly raised; leading to contracts with major opera houses in successive years. Also in 1974 she sang the Ring Cycle again at the Opéra National de Lyon and appeared at the Teatro di San Carlo.

In 1975, Knie made her United States opera debut with the Dallas Opera as Isolde in Wagner's Tristan und Isolde. The following year she returned to the Bayreuth Festspielhaus to sing the Ring again, made her debut with San Francisco Opera as Brünnhilde in Die Walküre, and made her Metropolitan Opera debut in the role of Chrysothemis in Strauss's Elektra. Over the next several years she sang lead roles at most of the world's leading opera houses including the Vienna State Opera, Hamburg State Opera, Bavarian State Opera, Staatstheater Stuttgart, Deutsche Oper Berlin, Nationaltheater Mannheim, Opéra National du Rhin, La Monnaie, Teatro Regio di Parma, Teatro Nacional de São Carlos, the Welsh National Opera, the Royal Swedish Opera, Opéra de Montréal, the Teatro Colón, and the Lyric Opera of Chicago.

In 1976, Knie abruptly left a production of The Ring after clashes with producer Patrice Chéreau and poor audience reaction to the then-controversial updating of the opera's setting to the Industrial Revolution. She was inducted into the Oklahoma Hall of Fame in 1982.

Although known for Wagner roles, she could perform the full gamut of the dramatic soprano repertoire. High points in her stage career include Senta in The Flying Dutchman, Elsa in Lohengrin, Sieglinde and several of the Valkyries in Die Walküre, Donna Anna in Mozart's Don Giovanni, Elettra in Mozart's Idomeneo, the Marschallin in Strauss's Der Rosenkavalier, Liza in Tschaikowsky's The Queen of Spades, and Leonore in both La forza del destino and Il trovatore, among other roles.

Her career was disrupted by illness several times – by viral pneumonia from 1981 to 1984, by a detached retina in 1991, and by colon cancer in 2000. She died on March 16, 2017, three days after her 79th birthday. She was survived by her partner of 24 years, Deborah Karner.

== Sources ==
- Roberta Knie biography from Operissimo.com (In German)
