= Linda Esther Gray =

Linda Esther Gray (born 29 May 1948, Greenock, Scotland) is a retired Scottish soprano and an operatic singing teacher.

== Early life ==
Gray was born in Greenock, Scotland in 1948. She showed an early talent in music and supplemented the usual Scottish primary and secondary state school education with private lessons in both singing and piano. In 1965 this tuition, and her natural ability, provided her with the skills to successfully gain a place at the Royal Scottish Academy of Music and Drama as an undergraduate student. Here she remained for four years concentrating her studies on singing, piano and cello. In 1969 (her final year at the Academy of Music) she won the International Cinzano Singing Award which granted a two-year scholarship to continue her musical education at the London Opera Centre (managed out of the Royal Opera House, Covent Garden and also acting at that time as the ROH's rehearsal space). It was in London that as a student she made her first appearance in an opera as Malenka in The Bartered Bride in 1970. Also, during this time, Gray continued to win a number of major singing awards (see awards section below).

== Opera career ==
Having completed her studies in Naples, she returned to the UK in 1972 and quickly began to establish her professional career: first with the Glyndebourne Touring Company (part of the Glyndebourne Opera Festival which helps to provide professional experience to young performers) and later within the context of The Glyndebourne Festival itself. It was with this company that, at the age of 23, she made her debut as Mimi in Puccini's La bohème – a role that remained in her professional repertoire until her retirement. Between her professional debut in 1971 and her final appearance in 1982 Gray toured the UK and Europe performing major roles for a number of major opera companies and houses. These included: Scottish Opera (1974–1979), English National Opera (1979), Welsh National Opera (1981), The Royal Opera House (1982). Her American debut was in Dallas in 1981 where she sang as Sieglinde in Richard Wagner's Die Walküre. During this time she became the Isolde of choice for famous British Wagnerian conductor Sir Reginald Goodall. Not only did she perform the role at a number of opera houses with Goodall conducting but Gray went on to record the role for him on the first digital recording of Tristan und Isolde in 1982. As the early 1980s progressed Gray's international fame and reputation grew and plans began to take place for her perform major roles at both La Scala and the Metropolitan Opera House but these were to never come to fruition. Instead, Grays operatic career shortly came to a permanent halt.

== Concert career ==
Like many established opera singers, Gray also had a successful concert career. This included performances of works by Mahler, Verdi, Handel, Haydn, Mendelssohn, Elgar, Rossini and Britten, together with song cycles by Wagner, Richard Strauss, Sibelius and Schumann. Special mention should be given to three performances: First, in 1981 she sang with the English National Opera when it celebrated its Golden Jubilee in the presence of the Queen. In 1982 she performed in front of the Prince of Wales at the London Coliseum, as part of a national tribute to British troops returning from the Falklands War. Finally, and also in 1982, Gray became the first Scottish soprano to sing at the opening night of the Edinburgh Festival, performing in Beethoven's 9th Symphony. Accompanied on the piano by Stephen Maughan, Gray returned to the concert platform in 2002 for a recital of Richard Wagner's Wesendonck Lieder. The historic occasion took place on 18 May at St. Columba's-by-the-Castle in Edinburgh, and was hosted by the Wagner Society of Scotland.

== Media personality ==
During her career Gray became something of a media personality, appearing alongside baritone Geraint Evans in the BBC chat show Three's Company and with her former music teacher Dame Eva Turner in one of several radio phone-ins discussing singing. She took part in BBC Radio 4's Food Programme and was photographed by David Bailey for The Observer.

== Retirement from the stage ==
Gray retired from the opera stage in 1982 after an illness left her unable to continue. She has been described as "one of the most lyric of modern sopranos", and was "expected to be the next Callas".

After many years of seclusion from the media she published her autobiography in 2007: A Life Behind Curtains: A Singer's Silent Sounds. She is now an opera coach working from her home in Surrey.

== Principal roles ==
While Gray sang many major opera roles (a number of them many times), her principal roles are considered to have been:

- Isolde: Tristan und Isolde (Wagner)
- Sieglinde: Die Walküre (Wagner)
- Kundry: Parsifal (Wagner)
- Tosca: Tosca (Puccini)
- Leonore: Fidelio (Beethoven)

== Discography ==
- Mahler: Symphony no. 8. BBC Symphony Orchestra. Pierre Boulez (BBC) 1975
- Wagner: Die Feen (The Fairies). Bavarian Radio Symphony Orchestra. Wolfgang Sawallisch. Orfeo. (Live Recording: Released 1995).
- Wagner: Tristan und Isolde. Welsh National Opera Orchestra. Reginald Goodall. (1982)
