= John Rich (producer) =

English theatre director and manager (1692–1761)

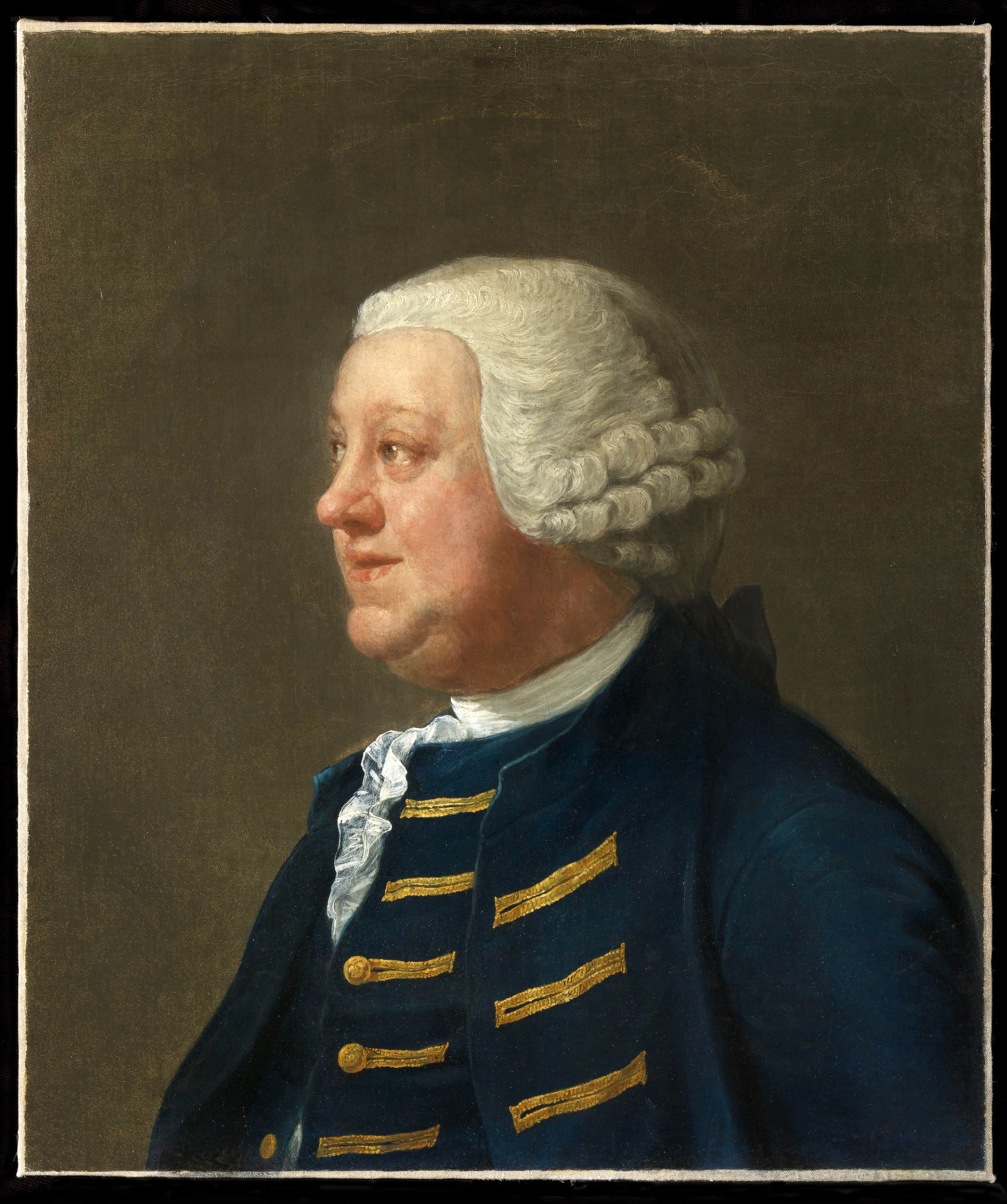
John Rich, as shown in the catalogue raisonné of William Hogarth

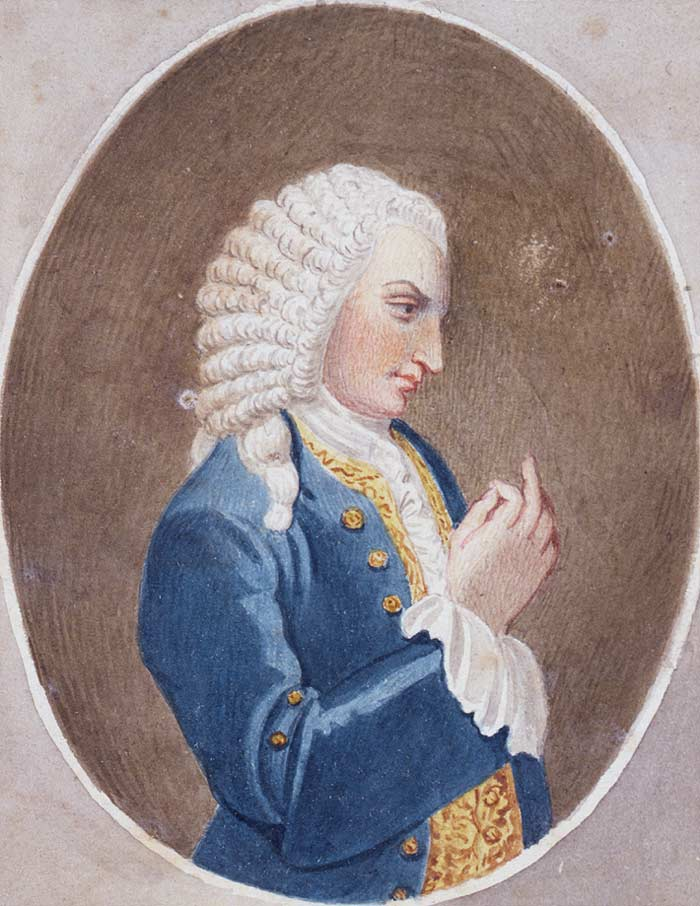
John Rich, from a print produced in 1750

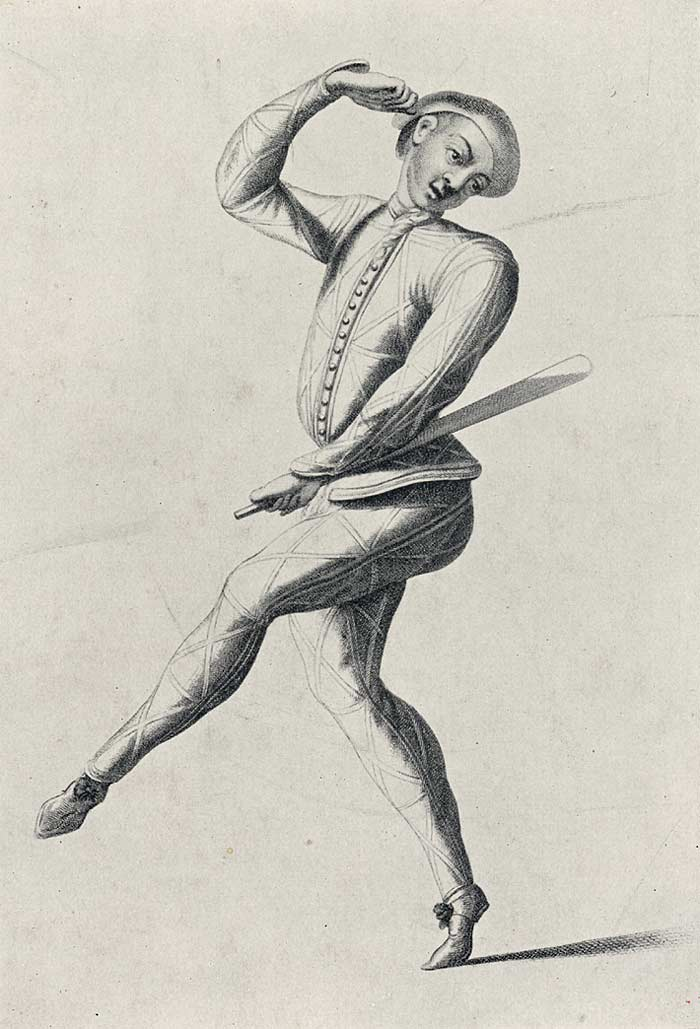
Rich as Harlequin, c. 1720

John Rich (1692–26 November 1761) was an important director and theatre manager in 18th-century London. He opened The New Theatre at Lincoln's Inn Fields in 1714, which he managed until he built the Theatre Royal, Covent Garden in 1732. He managed Covent Garden until 1761, putting on ever more lavish productions. He popularised pantomime on the English stage and played a dancing and mute Harlequin himself from 1717 to 1760 under the stage name of "Lun." Rich's version of the servant character, Arlecchino, moved away from the poor, dishevelled, loud, and crude character, to a colourfully-dressed, silent Harlequin, performing fanciful tricks, dances and magic. Rich's decision to be a silent character was influenced by his unappealing voice, of which he was well aware, and the British idea of the Harlequin character was heavily inspired by Rich's performances.

== Biography ==
Rich as theatre manager

The exact date of John Rich's birth has not been established. He was baptised on 19 May 1692 at St Andrew, Holborn, the eldest son of the theatre manager Christopher Rich, who died on 4 November 1714, and his wife Sarah (née Bewley).

Christopher Rich left his eldest son three-quarters of his share in the Lincoln's Inn Fields theatre, and its associated patent, in his will. John Rich's younger brother, Christopher Mosyer Rich (1693-1774) received the remaining quarter. At that time, the theatre was still under re-construction, and performances did not start until 14 December 1714. The two brothers undertook the management of the theatre together at the outset but, over the years, Christopher Mosyer gradually withdrew from active involvement.

Rich's theatre came to specialize in what contemporaries called "spectacle." Today we might call them "special effects." His stagings would endeavour to present actual cannon shots, animals, and multiple illusions of battle. In particular, John Rich exaggerated the theatricality of the Restoration spectacular by creating a new form of hireling drama designed strictly to generate opulent stagecraft. Rich's work was heavily criticised by some, with open letters being published, accusing his work of causing decay in the culture and morality of the stage.

When Alexander Pope wrote the first version of The Dunciad, and even more in the second and third editions, Rich appears as a prime symptom of the disease of the age and debasement of taste. In his Dunciad Variorum of 1732, he makes John Rich the angel of the goddess Dulness:

Immortal Rich! how calm he sits at ease
Mid snows of paper, and fierce hail of pease;
And proud his mistress' orders to perform,
Rides in the whirlwind, and directs the storm." (III l. 257–260)

During his time as producer and director, Rich had multiple battles with his rival managers, including Colley Cibber. Pope summarizes the battle between Cibber's Drury Lane and Rich's Lincoln's Inn Fields as,

"Here shouts all Drury, there all Lincoln's-Inn;
Contending Theatres our (Dulness's) empire raise,
Alike their labours, and alike their praise."

1728 was the year that Rich produced John Gay's The Beggar's Opera. The play ran so successfully, with 62 performances, that it was famously said the play "made Gay rich and Rich gay." John Gay was a long-time friend of Pope's and a frequent collaborator of his.

A couple of years after the success of The Beggar's Opera, Rich moved his company from Lincoln's Inn Fields to a new theatre in Covent Garden. It is still a common misconception that Rich built Covent Garden Theatre with the profits from The Beggar's Opera. The true facts have been readily available since at least 1906, when Henry Saxe Wyndham's history of the theatre was published. Rich did what any entrepreneur might do - he advertised for investors, raised the money, and with it built the theatre. A complete paper-trail showing these events still exists: a copy of his Proposals, which all the prospective investors signed, is in the British Library. The subsequent share allocation for each investor is entered in the Middlesex Deeds Register at the London Metropolitan Archives, and the records of Hoare’s Bank in Fleet Street show when the money was received. These facts can now be found elsewhere, in a variety of sources, and show that the profits from The Beggar’s Opera were not involved in any way. The Survey of London even includes an Appendix giving the names of all the investors. Rich's theatre opened in 1732 and was the first of three theatres on the site, now known as the Royal Opera House. Rich commissioned some of the great landscape artists of his day to paint scenery for the Theatre, including George Lambert.

Rich's Lincoln's Inn, and then Covent Garden, theatres were in competition throughout his lifetime with Cibber's Drury Lane. Indeed, the two theatres twice put on the same play on the same night, with Romeo and Juliet and King Lear in 1756–57. Rich's company also staged a number of Shakespearean plays that are rarely seen today, among them Cymbeline. In Cibber's Apology, he blames the degradation and skyrocketing costs of play productions on Rich. The general opinion of satirists was that Cibber was thoroughly as guilty as Rich.

Though he may have been portrayed poorly by his rivals, Rich earned a reputation for being a good manager among other players, for good business practices, as well as supporting actors who had left the stage.

Around 1735, John Rich founded the Beefsteak Club along with his scenic artist, George Lambert, that met on Saturdays at a room in Covent Garden theatre.

George Frideric Handel

In 1734, Rich began an association with George Frideric Handel, allowing performances of his operas and oratorios at his new Covent Garden theatre. However, the operas were now out of fashion, and had lost their popularity. Performances were discontinued after a couple of years. On the other hand, the oratorio performances proved to be extremely successful. They were performed on those days in Lent when theatrical performances were forbidden by the Lord Chamberlain, and conveniently filled a niche in the theatrical calendar. The performances became an annual event, and continued long after the deaths of both Handel and Rich.

Rich as performer

Rich began his work as "Lun" the Harlequin character in 1717, wearing a leotard with diamond-shaped patches and a mask, encouraging the silence that became normal for the pantomime character. By 1728, Rich was synonymous with lavish (and successful) productions. He performed multiple roles as the "Harlequin" character while the Manager at Lincoln's Inn Fields, including Harlequin Doctor Faustus. He was praised for his movement style, allowing each limb to tell a story, such as in Harlequin Sorcerer where he portrayed the harlequin being hatched from an egg. According to Soame Jenyns in The Art of Dancing, Rich was a fine dancer, noted for his elevation:

That Pindar Rich despises Vulgar Roads,
And soars an Eagle’s height among the Clouds,
Whilst humbler Dancers, fearful how they climb,
But buzz below amidst the flow’ry Thyme:
Now soft and slow he bends the circling Round,
Now rises high upon the spritely Bound,
Now springs aloft, too swift for Mortal sight,
Now falls unhurt from some stupendous Height;
Like Proteus, in a thousand Forms is seen,
Sometimes a God, sometimes an Harlequin.

After Rich's death on 26 November 1761, pantomime was criticised for losing the artistry he exhibited with his performances, relying instead more on spectacle and choral numbers. It wasn't until after his death, that many of his rivals, David Garrick included, would recognize his work. Garrick even said his pantomime performances were unmatched in his time.

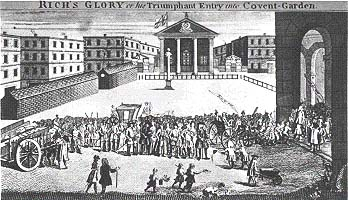
"Rich's Glory": John Rich takes over (seemingly invades) his new Covent Garden Theatre. (Hogarth caricature)

Private life

John Rich married Henrietta Brerewood on 7 February 1717 at St Clement Danes; they had a son who died in infancy. Henrietta died in September 1725, and Rich then formed a relationship with one of the actresses in his company, Amy Smithies. Her name is quoted in the dispute over the delay in finalising probate on Rich's will in 1779. They had four daughters who survived into adulthood: Henrietta (1727), Charlotte (c.1727?), Mary (1730) and Sarah (1733). Rich considered them to be his legitimate children, although no marriage has yet been found. Amy died in November 1737, and was buried as 'Amie, wife of Mr J Rich' on 1st December in the family tomb in Hillingdon. During this period Rich also had two children with another of his actresses, Ann Benson - Charles Rich was born in 1729, but nothing further is known about him; and he was followed by Catherine Benson c. 1730. Rich acknowledged Catherine as his 'natural daughter' in his will, and left her a bequest. Finally, in 1744, Rich married Priscilla Wilford, who used the stage name, Mrs Stevens. She survived him, and Rich's estate was eventually distributed equally between her and the four daughters.

Rich's niece, by Priscilla Wilford, was Mary Bulkley, who trained and performed at Covent Garden Theatre during his lifetime.

== See also ==
Owners, lessees and managers of the Royal Opera House, Covent Garden
