= Rosetta Pampanini =

Italian opera singer

Rosetta Pampanini (2 September 1896 – 2 August 1973) was an Italian lyric soprano, particularly associated with Puccini roles, especially Madama Butterfly.

== Biography ==
Pampanini was born in Milan. She began singing as a child, and later studied with Emma Malajoli. She made her stage debut in 1920, at the Teatro Nazionale in Rome, as Micaela, and in Turin in 1921, as Siebel. After further studies, she made her debut at the Teatro San Carlo in Naples, as Desdemona, in 1923, and sang the following year Elsa in Bergamo. Noticed by conductor Arturo Toscanini, she made her debut at the Teatro alla Scala in Milan, as Madama Butterfly, in 1925, and appeared there until 1937.

Afterwards she began singing at all the major opera houses of Europe; the Monte Carlo Opera in 1927, the Royal Opera House in London, from 1928 to 1933, the Liceu in Barcelona and the Vienna State Opera in 1930, the Lyric Opera of Chicago from 1931 to 1932, and the Paris Opéra in 1935. She also appeared in Buenos Aires and Rio de Janeiro.

A great Puccini interpreter, especially as Madama Butterfly, she also sang Manon Lescaut, La bohème, Tosca, and Liu in Turandot, also Mascagni's Il piccolo Marat and Iris, and Nedda in Leoncavallo's Pagliacci. Though essentially a lyric soprano, she occasionally sang a few spinto Verdi roles such as Leonora and Aida, and also Giordano's Maddalena and Fedora.

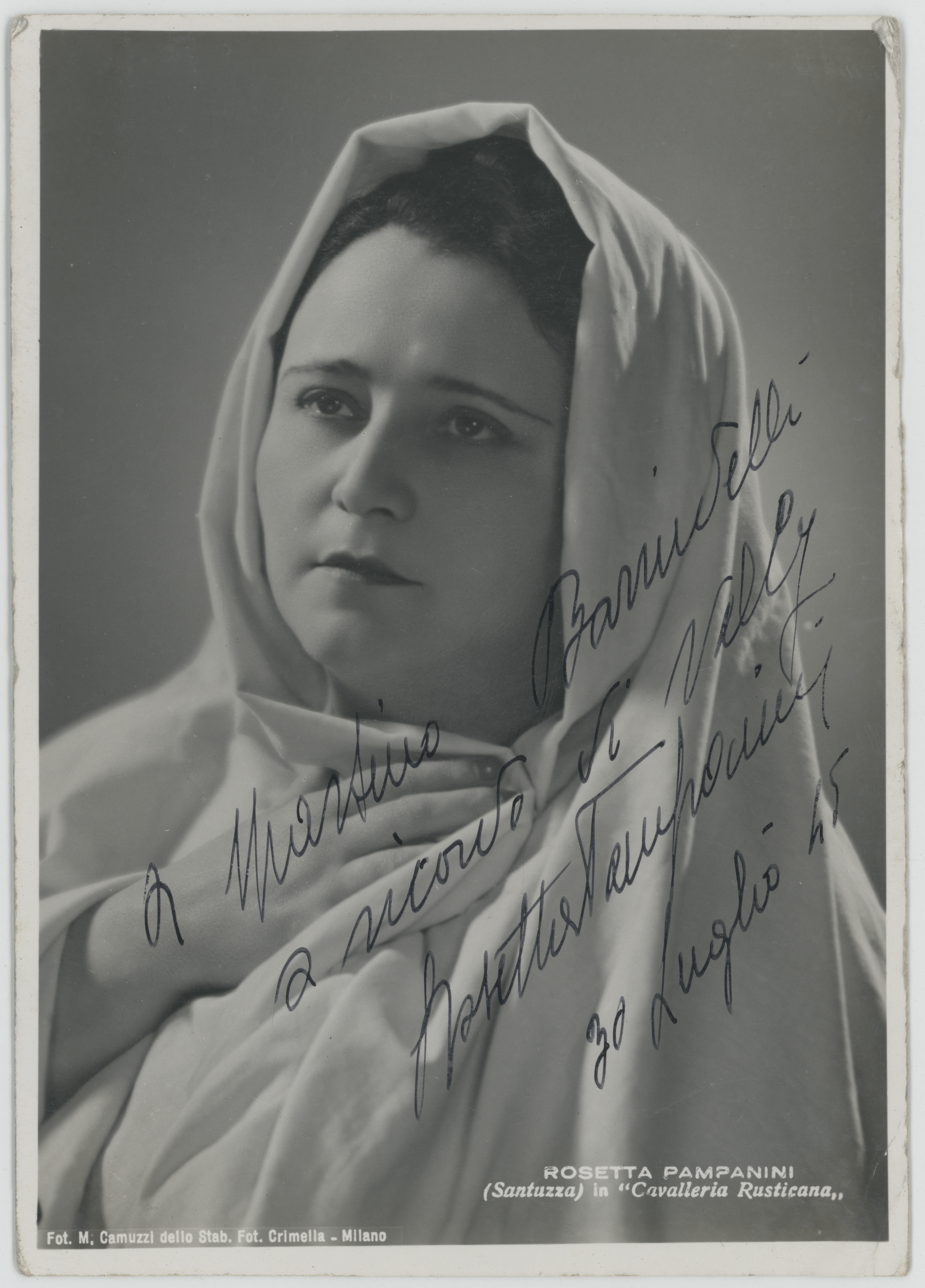
Rosetta Pampanini in Cavalleria rusticana (photo with 1945 dedication)

== Personal ==
She retired from the stage in 1946, and turned to teaching. Among her pupils was British soprano Amy Shuard. Pampanini died in Rovigo, aged 76.

== Sources ==
- Le guide de l'opéra, les indispensables de la musique, R. Mancini & J-J. Rouvereux, (Fayard, 1986) ISBN 2-213-01563-5
