= John Tooley =

English musical administrator (1924–2020)

Sir John Tooley
- Born: 1 June 1924; Rochester, Kent, England
- Died: 18 March 2020 (aged 95)
- Education: Magdalene College, Cambridge
- Occupation: Musical administrator

Sir John Tooley (1 June 1924 – 18 March 2020) was an English musical administrator who served as the general director of the Royal Opera House, Covent Garden, Central London. He held a range of appointments in the musical world, serving as a trustee or board member for many organisations.

After serving for 15 years as assistant and later deputy to Sir David Webster, the founder of the Royal Opera, Tooley succeeded him as general administrator in 1970 and served in the post (later retitled general director) until retiring in 1988.

== Life and career ==
Tooley was born in Rochester and educated at Repton School and Magdalene College, Cambridge. He had ambitions to become a professional singer, but later decided on a career as a musical administrator. As an assistant adjutant in the Rifle Brigade during the World War II, he learned much about administration. After that, his friends advised him to prepare himself for his planned career by working in industry for a few years to learn more about management. He joined the Ford Motor Company, where he worked, he said, "with some enlightened people", gaining experience. In 1952 he was appointed secretary to the Guildhall School of Music and Drama, remaining in the post until 1955, when he began his career at the Royal Opera House, Covent Garden.

In 1955 the Royal Opera House underwent an internal reorganisation. The deputy general administrator, Sir Steuart Wilson, left and Tooley was appointed assistant to the general administrator, David Webster. He was promoted to assistant general administrator in 1960, and served in that post until Webster's retirement in 1970. In the late 1960s, Webster's health became uncertain, and much of the day-to-day business of running the opera house fell to Tooley. He was appointed to succeed Webster, and held the post of general administrator until 1980, when it was renamed general director. He retired from the post in 1988.

The opera commentator Harold Rosenthal wrote of Tooley's important role in coordinating the workings of the major European and American opera houses. He promoted regular meetings of the heads of these houses, with the aim of resisting excessive fees for star singers and also of sharing costs by staging co-productions. To attract a new and younger audience to the Royal Opera House, Tooley set up a series of "promenade" performances of operas, with low-priced admission to the stalls area, from which the seats were temporarily removed.

Tooley held a large number of other appointments in the musical world, serving as a trustee or board member of the Walton Trust, the Britten Estate, the Southbank Centre and the Welsh National Opera among others. He was knighted in the 1979 Birthday Honours.

He married, and divorced, three times: from 1951 to 1965 he was married to Judith Craig (née Morris); from 1968 to 1990 to Patricia Janet Norah (née Bagshawe); and from 1995 to 2003 to Jennifer-Anne (née Shannon). He published his memoirs, In House (1999); The Times said of it, "His regime is now regarded as a golden era when the opera house could still attract stars such as Maria Callas, Placido Domingo and Rudolph Nureyev. His book … gives an insider's account of the sometimes tempestuous times at Covent Garden since the war."

Tooley died on 18 March 2020, aged 95. His family indicated the funeral would be private.
