= Amy Shuard =

English opera singer (1924–1975)

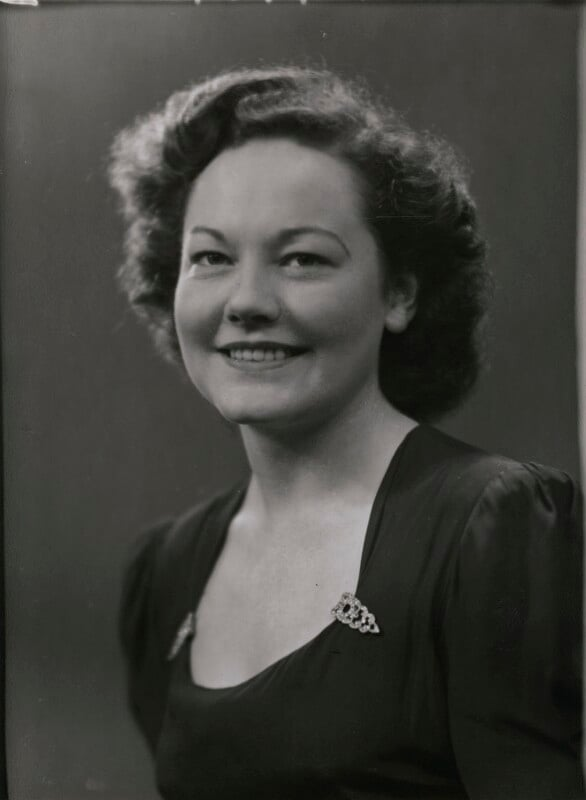
Shuard c. 1950

Amy Shuard CBE (19 July 1924 – 18 April 1975) was an English operatic soprano renowned in such dramatic roles as Elektra, Turandot and Brünnhilde. She created both title roles in Janáček's Káťa Kabanová and Jenůfa in their respective British premieres. She has been described as "the best English dramatic soprano since Eva Turner" (her teacher).

== Biography ==
Shuard was born in London. After studying at the Trinity College of Music, she had lessons from Eva Turner. In 1948 the Worshipful Company of Musicians awarded her a prize and she toured South Africa as the organization's representative. She returned there in 1949 to make her operatic debut, in Johannesburg, in the title role of Verdi's Aida; during that season she also sang Giulietta in The Tales of Hoffmann and Venus in Tannhäuser.

She sang at Sadlers Wells from 1949 to 1953, before undertaking more study in Milan with Rosetta Pampanini, and then at Covent Garden from 1954 until her death. She also sang at Bayreuth, La Scala, Vienna, Buenos Aires and San Francisco.

Her notable roles included the title roles in Káťa Kabanová (in the 1951 United Kingdom premiere), Jenůfa (in the 1956 UK premiere), Les Troyens (1957), Carmen, Tosca, Turandot, Elektra, Madama Butterfly and Aida; as well as Santuzza in Cavalleria rusticana, Eboli in Don Carlos, Tatyana in Eugene Onegin, Magda Sorel in The Consul, Lady Macbeth (in the first production of Verdi's Macbeth at Covent Garden), and Kostelnička Buryjovka in Jenůfa in 1972 and 1974.

The latter part of her career saw her essay Wagnerian roles, and she was the first English soprano to sing Brünnhilde at Covent Garden. She also sang Isolde at Geneva, as well as Sieglinde and Kundry.

San Francisco was the principal place she appeared on stage in the United States, firstly as Brünnhilde in Die Walküre in October 1963, then in 1966 as Elektra, 1968 as Turandot, and finally as Brünnhilde in Götterdämmerung in 1969. She also appeared as Kat'a Kabanova at New York's Empire Music Festival in 1960.

In 1948, she married Dr Peter Asher. Amy Shuard was appointed a Commander of the Order of the British Empire (CBE) in 1966. She died in 1975, aged 50.

== Recordings ==
Amy Shuard made only a few studio recordings, but there are many live recordings of her performances. A complete list can be found online.

Currently available recordings include:

- Hector Berlioz: The Trojans, under Rafael Kubelík, with Jon Vickers, Blanche Thebom, Lauris Elms, Joan Carlyle and others
- Giuseppe Verdi: Macbeth, under Francesco Molinari-Pradelli, with Tito Gobbi, Forbes Robinson and others
- Verdi: Requiem, under Carlo Maria Giulini, with Richard Lewis, Anna Reynolds and David Ward.
- She appears on Volume 5 of The Record of Singing.
