= Mary Allen (arts administrator) =

Writer and arts administrator

- Born: 22 August 1951 (age 74)
- Occupation: Manager of the Royal Opera House
- Years active: 1997–1998

Mary Allen (born 22 August 1951) is a British writer, broadcaster, arts administrator and management consultant best known for her controversial and turbulent period as Chief Executive of the Royal Opera House.

== Early career ==
She was educated at the School of St Helen and St Katharine in Abingdon, New Hall, Cambridge and the University of East Anglia (MA Creative Writing). In the early 1970s she worked under the name of Mary Adames as an actress in repertory theatre and the West End. She appeared in an early London production of The Rocky Horror Show and toured with Godspell. After working for private companies as a management trainer and consultant, as well as running Watermans Arts Centre in west London, Allen worked for the Arts Council of England rising to the position of Secretary General in 1994 just as the organisation took on the responsibility of distributing National Lottery funds, before becoming Chief Executive of the Royal Opera House in London.

== The Royal Opera House ==
In mid-1996, with the retirement of then general director Jeremy Isaacs approaching with a year, consideration of a likely successor generated some speculation in the British press. Among the four women named were Genista McIntosh and Mary Allen, although the latter "publicly stated that she would not be taking the job".

McIntosh became General Director of the Royal Opera House in early 1997, but resigned after five months on the job due to ill health. Allen was immediately approached by "the Royal Opera House's chairman, Lord Chadlington, [who] then appointed Mrs Allen to replace her without advertising the post." . Although he was not "not happy" with the appointment, the decision was accepted by Chris Smith as the responsible minister, even though it breached the conditions of the Arts Council's own funding for the organisation. Although Allen took over her new post unaware how close the organisation was to bankruptcy, she began steering the major refurbishment of the House.

Later that year a Select committee investigation was led by Gerald Kaufman MP. He was critical of Allen's actions and "demanded her removal 'with immediate effect' ". This led to her offering to resign.

The Select Committee's Report was also critical of the actions of the entire Board of the Royal Opera House:

"We would prefer to see the house run by a philistine with the requisite financial acumen than by the succession of opera and ballet lovers who have brought a great and valuable institution to its knees," it said.

The Board were forced to resign and, in January 1998, "Sir Colin Southgate (EMI chairman) [was] appointed as ROH's chairman and he threatened that ballet and opera performances may have to cease for two years to save money." It has been noted that Allen was essentially forced out of the position, with the one person coming to her defence unprompted being the conductor Bernard Haitink, the ROH's music director. "What is desperately needed at the moment is a modicum of stability," Haitink declared in an open letter. "A third change of leadership within a year is not the answer." However, although Allen was formally asked to stay on, she resigned in March 1998.

== Life after the Opera House ==
Allen published a book, A House Divided, containing her diaries of the period that she was general manager of the Covent Garden Opera House. Since leaving that post, Allen has presented various programmes on BBC Radio 4, covering current events and the arts.

A friend of Douglas Adams since Cambridge, Allen gave the eulogy at his funeral.

== See also ==
- Royal Opera House
- Arts Council of Great Britain
