= Constance Shacklock =

English contralto

Constance Shacklock OBE (16 April 1913 – 29 June 1999) was an English contralto. After more than a decade of roles with the Covent Garden Opera Company, with other companies and on the concert stage, Shacklock performed for six years in The Sound of Music in London as the Mother Abbess. She taught singing at the Royal Academy of Music from 1968 to 1978.

== Life and career ==
Shacklock was born in Sherwood, Nottingham, to Frederick Randolph Shacklock and his wife Hilda, and trained at the Royal Academy of Music. Her career took off after she was recruited in 1946 to the new Covent Garden Opera Company. Her first Covent Garden appearance was in Purcell's masque The Fairy-Queen. She remained with the company for a decade, beginning with small roles such as Mercedes in Carmen and moving up to leading parts including Carmen, Octavian (Der Rosenkavalier), Marina (Boris Godunov), Magdalene (Die Meistersinger), and Mrs Sedley (Peter Grimes). In 1948 she was cast as Brangane in Tristan and Isolde alongside the celebrated Norwegian soprano, Kirsten Flagstad. In 1953 she shared the title role of Britten's Gloriana with Joan Cross.

Away from Covent Garden, Shacklock appeared in opera in Berlin with Erich Kleiber, and sang in oratorio, notably as the angel in The Dream of Gerontius with Sir John Barbirolli. She was also a regular at Last Night of the Proms with Sir Malcolm Sargent, celebrated for her singing of "Rule, Britannia!" She also performed in Argentina as Octavian in Der Rosenkavalier, with Birgit Nilsson as the Marschallin.

In 1961, Shacklock left the operatic stage and joined the cast of The Sound of Music for an unexpected six-year run as the Mother Abbess at the Palace Theatre, London. She retired from performing, and taught singing at the Royal Academy of Music from 1968 to 1978. Notable students included the British opera singers Kathryn Harries and Victoria Burmester. Shacklock was awarded the OBE in 1971 and became president of the Association of Teachers of Singing in 1995. While teaching at the Royal Academy of Music she became close friends with a young mezzo-soprano from Birmingham called Jean Tredaway, whom she subsequently adopted. Jean Tredaway, who died in 2006, was born in 1935, the youngest of eight children of Robert H. Tredaway and May Trueman.

Shacklock married organist Eric George Mitchell in 1947 (died 1965). She died in London in 1999. A vast archive of personal documents once belonging to her was discovered in a Midlands property and was auctioned on 18 August 2010 in Lichfield. The eponymous Constance Close in Kingston Vale, Surrey, was created on the site of her residence in her memory.

== Sources ==
- "Constance Shacklock, 86, Mezzo-Soprano". The New York Times. 4 July 1999.
- Blyth, Alan (1 July 1999). "Constance Shacklock". The Guardian.
- Forbes, Elizabeth (30 June 1999). "Obituary: Constance Shacklock". The Independent.
- Blyth, Alan (2004). "Shacklock, Constance Bertha (1913–1999)". Oxford Dictionary of National Biography.
- "Tribute to Constance Shacklock OBE". World Collectors Net. Archived from the original on 13 June 2011.
- "A Tribute to Constance Shacklock OBE". Richard Winterton Auctioneers. Archived from the original on 10 March 2012.
