= David Webster (opera manager) =

David Webster by David Hockney

Sir David Lumsden Webster KCVO FRCM (3 July 1903 – 9 May 1971) was the chief executive of the Royal Opera House, Covent Garden, from 1945 to 1970. He played a key part in the establishment of the Royal Ballet and Royal Opera companies.

From a retail background, Webster became chairman of the Liverpool Philharmonic during the Second World War. From there he was asked to set up opera and ballet companies at Covent Garden. He persuaded the existing Sadler's Wells Ballet to move to the opera house but found no established opera company suitable to do the same, and he set up a new opera company from scratch.

At first, Webster presented opera in English with a permanent company, but as Covent Garden flourished and international stars were attracted to appear, the policy gradually changed to presenting operas in their original language. By the time of Webster's retirement, the Royal Opera and the Royal Ballet were world-famous.

== Early life ==
David Webster was born in Dundee. When he was ten the family moved to Liverpool, where Webster was educated at the Holt High School and the University of Liverpool, where he graduated in economics in 1924. He joined a local department store, Lewis's, where he rose swiftly to become general manager of the group's smaller Liverpool store, the Bon Marché, and then of the main Lewis's store in 1939. In 1931 while on business for Lewis's he met his lifelong partner, James Cleveland Belle, who became a successful businessman.

In his spare time Webster engaged in amateur theatricals, becoming a leading figure in an influential Liverpool group, the Sandon Society. Recognising that his looks and stature were not those of a potential star Webster resisted the temptation to pursue a professional theatrical career, but through the Sandon Society met many leading figures in the theatre, ballet and music. He became a prominent member of the management committee of the Liverpool Philharmonic Society, and in 1940 was appointed its chairman.

At the outbreak of the Second World War there had been pressure to suspend the orchestra's concerts. Webster strongly resisted it, insisting that music was an essential morale-booster. He set up low-priced concerts for factory workers and members of the armed forces. Webster was fortunate in recruiting Malcolm Sargent as chief conductor, since whatever orchestral players thought of Sargent (his nickname 'Flash Harry' was not originally an affectionate one), he was immensely popular with the public. Guest conductors included Sir Henry Wood and Charles Münch. Wartime disbanding of other orchestras enabled Webster and Sargent to recruit leading British players such as Anthony Pini and Reginald Kell, with the result that for a few years the Liverpool Philharmonic had a strong claim to be the finest orchestra in the country, until Walter Legge set up the Philharmonia after the war. During Webster's time as chairman, the orchestra increased its concerts from 32 a year to 148 and became a permanent body for the first time.

== Royal Opera House, Covent Garden ==
Before the war there had been no permanent company at Covent Garden. Sir Thomas Beecham, as proprietor of the opera house, had staged annual seasons, with international stars on stage and his own London Philharmonic Orchestra in the pit. During the war, the Royal Opera House had been converted into a dance hall. The music publishers Boosey & Hawkes acquired the lease of the building in 1944 and proposed to re-establish opera and ballet there.

The new chairman of Covent Garden, the economist John Maynard Keynes, agreed with Leslie Boosey and Ralph Hawkes that a permanent ensemble was needed, and that it had to be run by a businessman. Webster was invited to become chief executive, under the title General Administrator, which he used throughout his tenure. His selection was driven by two key facts: firstly, he was successful as a retailer with a well-developed sense of what his customers wanted and how he could give it to them; secondly, he had demonstrated his strength in arts administration. Beecham, furious at his exclusion, waged an intermittent campaign against Webster and all his works throughout the 1950s, though he conducted one of the earliest operatic furores of Webster's reign, Die Meistersinger, in 1951.

Webster persuaded the Sadler's Wells Ballet to take up residence at Covent Garden. On the operatic side, however, Webster had to create a new company from scratch. He appointed as musical director an efficient but less known conductor, Karl Rankl, a pupil of Schoenberg and Webern, who trained a new chorus and orchestra. British singers were recruited for as many leading roles as possible, and the policy of the house was that operas should be sung in English.

The Royal Opera House was re-opened under Webster's direction on 20 February 1946 with a production of The Sleeping Beauty designed by Oliver Messel. The history of the Royal Opera House for the rest of Webster's management was of gradual improvement from its early impoverished and provincial image to international importance as one of the top opera houses of the world. The ballet, under the rule of Ninette de Valois, aided by Frederick Ashton, went from strength to strength: by 1957 the company had been granted the title of ‘The Royal Ballet’; in the 1960s the partnership of Margot Fonteyn and Rudolf Nureyev elevated the company to international notice.

Operatically, Webster's task was both harder and less predictable. He reluctantly recognised that international singers could not be asked to relearn their roles in English, and that opera at the highest level must therefore be sung in the original language. His appointment of Karl Rankl as the first musical director was controversial and drew criticism from the musical establishment of the day, not least from Beecham, Barbirolli, Sargent, Albert Coates and Stanford Robinson. However, with twenty years' experience in European opera houses, Rankl's strengths in training the chorus and orchestra could be put to good use. In the 1950s Webster had a succession of failed attempts to find a top flight musical director for the opera company. Between 1951 and 1955, and again between 1958 and 1961, the company was without a musical director. Erich Kleiber and Rudolf Kempe made guest appearances but declined the permanent post. Rafael Kubelík accepted, but was not seen at the time as an unqualified success.

Among key opera productions, the première of Benjamin Britten's Gloriana in 1953 was not well received, but among the productions that assured the Royal Opera House an international success were the first nearly-complete performances at any opera house of Berlioz's The Trojans in 1957, the Luchino Visconti production of Verdi's Don Carlos, which marked the centenary of the present-day house in 1958, and the Franco Zeffirelli production of Puccini's Tosca, with Maria Callas and Tito Gobbi in 1964.

The appointment of Georg Solti as musical director in 1961 may be taken to mark the beginning of the opera company's rise to international status. The Gramophone magazine said of Webster:

It was he who gave Sutherland her first big break (in Lucia). It was he who changed Jon Vickers almost overnight from an occasional concert singer into one of the best of present-day dramatic tenors. It was he who carefully nurtured the talents of Sir Geraint Evans, Josephine Veasey, Gwyneth Jones, Peter Glossop and many others. ... He was also proud that productions such as The Trojans, Pelléas et Mélisande and The Midsummer Marriage could be taken straight off his stage and recorded.

First knighted in the 1960 New Year Honours, Webster was created Knight Commander of the Royal Victorian Order (KCVO) in the 1970 Birthday Honours. Almost his final act as General Administrator was to appoint, from Autumn 1971, Colin Davis as musical director. Webster retired in 1970, after a farewell gala, for which Britten composed a fanfare. He was succeeded by his deputy, John Tooley.

Away from the opera house, Webster's musical tastes were wide: "he could discourse on everything from the Beatles through Ellington to Toscanini".

Webster died in Brighton at the age of 67, less than a year after his retirement.
