= Mansfield and Sutton Astronomical Society =

Astronomical society in the East Midlands of England

- Abbreviation: MSAS
- Formation: 1969
- Type: Astronomical society
- Legal status: Non-profit making registered charity
- Purpose: Furthering interest in astronomy within the community
- Headquarters: Sherwood Observatory, Coxmoor Road, Sutton-in-Ashfield, Nottinghamshire, NG17 5LF, England
- Coordinates: 53.114214°N 1.221977°W
- Region served: Mansfield and adjacent areas of Nottinghamshire
- Main organ: Committee
- Affiliations: Member of The Federation of Astronomical Societies
- Website: http://www.sherwood-observatory.org.uk

Mansfield and Sutton Astronomical Society (MSAS) is an amateur astronomical society in the East Midlands of England. It was formed in 1969. It is based at Sherwood Observatory, a 61 cm mirror telescope which it owns and operates. The observatory lies 4 km south west of the centre of Mansfield on one of the highest points in the county of Nottinghamshire.

The society is a member of The Federation of Astronomical Societies.

== Aims ==
The aims of the society are to:

- further the interests of Astronomy and related subjects within the local community
- introduce the public to the subject of Astronomy
- provide a forum for education in Astronomy and observational techniques through a collaboration with the University of Nottingham
- provide members with the best observational equipment possible.

== Meetings ==
The society holds monthly members-only lecture meetings at the observatory, along with observing and training evenings for members.

== Outreach ==
The society runs a night school for those who wish to learn about astronomy and the universe. These are usually held at the observatory on Friday evenings.

== Funding ==
MSAS is a registered charity. It is funded through member subscriptions, fund raising events, public open evenings held at the society's Observatory, charitable donations and grants.

== Patrons ==
The patrons of the society are:

- Professor Sir Francis Graham Smith, 13th Astronomer Royal (1982–1990).
- Professor Michael R. Merrifield, School of Physics and Astronomy, University of Nottingham.

== See also ==
- List of astronomical societies
