= 7166 Kennedy =

Main-belt asteroid

- Kennedy imaged by LONEOS in October 2004

Discovery
- Discovered by: E. Bowell
- Discovery site: Anderson Mesa Stn.
- Discovery date: 15 October 1985

Designations
- Named after: Malcolm Kennedy (Astronomical Society of Glasgow)
- Alternative designations: 1985 TR · 1976 JA_{10} 1991 HC_{5} · 1992 OZ_{8}
- Minor planet category: main-belt · (inner); Nysa-Polana complex · background

Orbital characteristics
- Epoch 4 September 2017 (JD 2458000.5)
- Uncertainty parameter 0
- Observation arc: 62.93 yr (22,986 days)
- Aphelion: 2.7579 AU
- Perihelion: 2.1036 AU
- Semi-major axis: 2.4307 AU
- Eccentricity: 0.1346
- Orbital period (sidereal): 3.79 yr (1,384 days)
- Mean anomaly: 105.04°
- Mean motion: 0° 15^{m} 36.36^{s} / day
- Inclination: 3.7053°
- Longitude of ascending node: 14.082°
- Argument of perihelion: 64.060°

Physical characteristics
- Dimensions: 4.42 km (calculated); 5.129±0.149 km
- Synodic rotation period: 3.659±0.0011 h
- Geometric albedo: 0.21 (assumed); 0.267±0.048
- Spectral type: S
- Absolute magnitude (H): 13.5 · 13.633±0.003 (R) · 13.8 · 14.06±0.23 · 14.08

7166 Kennedy, provisional designation 1985 TR, is a stony asteroid located in the inner region of the asteroid belt, approximately 5 kilometers in diameter. It was discovered on 15 October 1985, by American astronomer Edward Bowell at Lowell's Anderson Mesa Station near Flagstaff, Arizona, in the United States. The asteroid was named after Malcolm Kennedy of the Astronomical Society of Glasgow.

== Orbit and classification ==
Kennedy is a member of the Nysa–Polana complex, a collection of overlapping asteroid families located in the inner main asteroid belt near the Kirkwood gap (3:1 orbital resonance with Jupiter). It orbits the Sun in the inner main-belt at a distance of 2.1–2.8 AU once every 3 years and 9 months (1,384 days). Its orbit has an eccentricity of 0.13 and an inclination of 4° with respect to the ecliptic. The body's observation arc begins with a precovery taken at Palomar Observatory in June 1954, more than 31 years prior to its official discovery observation at Anderson Mesa.

== Physical characteristics ==
Kennedy has been characterized as a common stony S-type asteroid by PanSTARRS photometric survey.

=== Rotation period ===
In December 2012, a rotational lightcurve of Kennedy was obtained from photometric observations in the R-band by astronomers at the Palomar Transient Factory in California. Lightcurve analysis gave a rotation period of 3.659 hours with a brightness amplitude of 0.52 magnitude (U=2).

=== Diameter and albedo ===
According to the survey carried out by the NEOWISE mission of NASA's Wide-field Infrared Survey Explorer, Kennedy measures 5.129 kilometers in diameter and its surface has an albedo of 0.267, while the Collaborative Asteroid Lightcurve Link assumes an albedo of 0.21 and calculates a diameter of 4.42 kilometers based on an absolute magnitude of 14.08.

== Naming ==
This minor planet was named in memory of Malcolm Kennedy (1944–1997), secretary of the Astronomical Society of Glasgow. He was born and raised in New Zealand and became a civil engineer in Scotland. The official naming citation was published by the Minor Planet Center on 8 August 1998 (M.P.C. 32348).
