= Astronomical Society of Glasgow =

Astronomical society in Scotland

- Established: 1954
- Location: Glasgow, Scotland
- Website: http://www.theasg.org.uk/

The Astronomical Society of Glasgow (ASG) was founded in 1954 in Glasgow, Scotland, by amateur astronomers and is dedicated to promoting an interest in Astronomy.

== History ==
The story of Glasgow’s astronomical societies begins in 1809 when the Glasgow Society for Promoting Astronomical Science was inaugurated. Ambitious plans were prepared for an Observatory to cost £1,500 and a site was chosen on Garnethill. The Convenor, Andrew Ure, went to Largs to confer with Sir Thomas Makdougall Brisbane and also went to London to confer with leading scientists of the day. The Observatory was built - an ornate Egyptian-style building, equipped with some excellent instruments. However, the Society ran out of funds, the Observatory was surrounded by new building and became unsuitable for its purpose. The Society was disbanded in 1822 and some of the instruments were identified as being sold off although others just ‘disappeared’. Around 1830-32 the building was demolished.

A West of Scotland Branch of the British Astronomical Society was founded in 1894 and based in Glasgow. The inaugural meeting took place on 23 November that year when members were addressed by E. W. Maunder, founder of the BAA and Editor of the Journal. His subject was ‘In Pursuit of a Shadow’ - an account of the recent eclipse expedition.

In 1904, the Branch requested permission to enrol associated not directly connected with the BAA. The resulting increase in membership was so great that it was found necessary to seek a new meeting place. In October 1905, the Branch met for the first time in the new buildings of the Royal Technical College, Glasgow. (This association has happily been maintained and to this day the Society meets within the University of Strathclyde). Also about 1905, the Branch obtained authority to enrol members resident in any part of Scotland and eventually in 1937, the name was changed to ‘Scottish Branch’.

With the close of the session 1943-44, the Branch completed fifty years of useful life and this was celebrated, amongst other things, by the re-election of Professor Smart to the Jubilee Chair. There was a civic reception in the City Chambers, and a Dinner was held. The Astronomer Royal, Sir Harold Spencer-Jones, addressed the Branch.

About ten years later, it was decided to wind up the Branch and reconstitute it as The Astronomical Society of Glasgow, affiliated to the BAA. This took effect on 30 April 1954.

== Events ==
The Society is involved in a number of outreach events, bringing Astronomy to the people of Glasgow and further afield.

- From October till March, the Society run Stars Over The Botanics events for the public at Glasgow Botanic Gardens. With a number of different scopes, the public have a chance to observe some of the wonders of the Night Sky; the craters on the moon, planets and distant galaxies. If the skies aren't clear, there are number of presentations and talks on various astronomy topics in the Kibble Palace.
- In September and April, the Society organise Sun Over the Botanics events, which are free events and, with the special sun filters and PST telescopes, enable the public to see features on the surface of the Sun, such as sunspots, granulation and prominences.

In 2011, the Society organised a free Stars Over The Botanics as part of the BBC's Stargazing Live and in 2012, they were part of the BBC's Discovery Night, based at the Glasgow Botanic Gardens and the nearby Oran Mor.

In 2014, the Society took part in a Stargazing Evening at Whitelee Wind Farm with Glasgow Science Centre."Stargazing at Whitelee". Archived from the original on 4 March 2016.

== Asteroid 5805 ==
In 1994, the asteroid 5805 Glasgow was named for the city of Glasgow and the Astronomical Society of Glasgow. The current Logo for the Society is based around the asteroid. The asteroid orbits the sun at semimajor axis 2.6AU, has a modest eccentricity of 0.11 and an inclination of 12 degrees. Its diameter is about 19 km if a C-class asteroid or 10 km if S-class (equally likely). Thus its surface area is larger than that of the city for which it is named.

== Honorary presidents ==
- Alexander Boksenberg
- Edward L. G. Bowell
- John Campbell Brown, Astronomer Royal for Scotland
- Arnold Wolfendale

== Affiliations ==
The Astronomical Society of Glasgow is a member of the British Association of Planetaria and is affiliated to the British Astronomical Association and the Scottish Astronomers' Group. The society is a member of the Federation of Astronomical Societies, and is a registered Scottish charity (Charity Number SCO15035).

== See also ==
- List of astronomical societies
