= Journal of the British Astronomical Association =

- Discipline: Astronomy
- Language: English
- Edited by: Philip Jennings

Publication details
- History: 1890–present
- Publisher: British Astronomical Association
- Frequency: Bimonthly

Standard abbreviations
- ISO 4: J. Br. Astron. Assoc.

Indexing
- CODEN: JBAAA6
- ISSN: 0007-0297
- LCCN: ca10005073
- OCLC no.: 01537134

Links
- Journal homepage; Online archive; Online indexes (1994–2008)

The Journal of the British Astronomical Association is a peer-reviewed scientific journal of astronomy published by the British Astronomical Association since October 1890. It is currently edited by Philip Jennings and publishes original research articles, as well as news items relevant to the association and the proceedings of association meetings. Letters to the editor, book reviews, and obituaries are also published.

== Abstracting and indexing ==
The journal is indexed and abstracted in the following databases:

- Astrophysics Data System
- Computer & Control Abstracts
- Electrical & Electronics Abstracts
- Energy Research Abstracts
- International Aerospace Abstracts
- Physics Abstracts

== Editors ==
- Edward Walter Maunder 1890-1894
- Annie Scott Dill Russell 1894-1896
- Edward Walter Maunder 1896-1900
- Frederick William Levander 1900-1916
- Annie Scott Dill Maunder 1917-1930
- Peter Doig 1930-1937
- R. M. Fry 1937-1946
- Francis John Sellers 1941-1946 (acting)
- John Leslie Haughton 1946-1948
- Peter Doig 1948-1952
- Neville Goodman 1952-1960
- D. G. Hinds 1960-1963
- Frank Hyde 1963-1965
- Colin Ronan 1965-1985
- Nigel Henbest 1985-1987
- Jacqueline Mitton 1987-1993
- Hazel McGee 1994-2018
- Philip Jennings 2018-date
