= Sherwood Observatory =

Astronomical observatory in Nottinghamshire

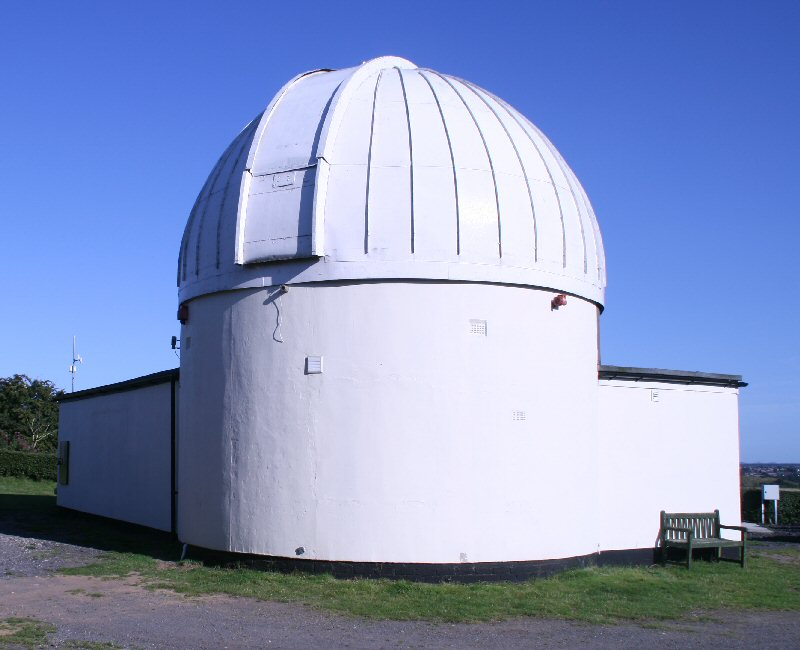
- View of Sherwood Observatory looking north
- Organization: MSAS
- Location: Sutton-in-Ashfield, Nottinghamshire, England
- Coordinates: 53°06′51″N 1°13′19″W
- Altitude: 187.9 m (616 ft)
- Established: 1970
- Website: Sherwood Observatory

Sherwood Observatory is an amateur astronomical observatory in Nottinghamshire, England, owned and operated by Mansfield and Sutton Astronomical Society. The main dome is 6.5 m (21 ft) in diameter and houses a 0.61 m (2 ft 0 in) Newtonian reflecting telescope. A club meeting room hosts society meetings and also serves as a lecture theatre for the public on open evenings.

== Early history ==
The first meeting of Mansfield and Sutton Astronomical Society (MSAS) took place in February 1970, and early gatherings took place at a local engineering company. The founding members planned to build an observatory, and by 1972 had purchased a piece of land at one of the highest points in Nottinghamshire. Site preparation commenced with foundations poured in 1975. All building work was done by members, with the majority of materials being reclaimed from local demolition sites.

The dome was designed with the help of the University of Nottingham architecture department. The main ring-beam and aperture guides for the dome were made from 4x2 inch steel channeling, bent to shape using a large hydraulic jack normally used to lift heavy goods vehicles. Thirty supporting ribs were made from T-section aluminium, and 120 sheets of aluminium cut and shaped by hand were fixed to the structure by over 5,000 rivets.

The telescope main-frame was built by members from scaffold tubing and mounted on an equatorial fork driven by DC electrical motors for tracking the stars. The main mirror was ground at the observatory by a home-made mirror grinding machine over a period of four years, however this piece of glass was damaged when sent away for aluminising. After a period of fundraising a mirror was purchased and installed in the telescope with Messier 42, the Orion Nebula, being the target for first light.

Sherwood Observatory was officially opened in 1986 by the Astronomer Royal, Professor Sir Francis Graham-Smith.

== Telescope ==
The main instrument at Sherwood Observatory is a Newtonian telescope on an equatorial fork mount. The telescope was initially constructed as a Nasmyth reflector, but due to collimation problems it was converted in the 1990s to the simpler Newtonian configuration.

The telescope has stepper motor drive control with an electrical focussed. The dome is electrically driven and will move automatically as the telescope tracks across the sky. Various cameras can be attached to the telescope to record images and video and display what the telescope sees on a two-metre wide projector screen in the lecture theatre, from where the telescope can be controlled.

== Planetarium & Science Centre ==
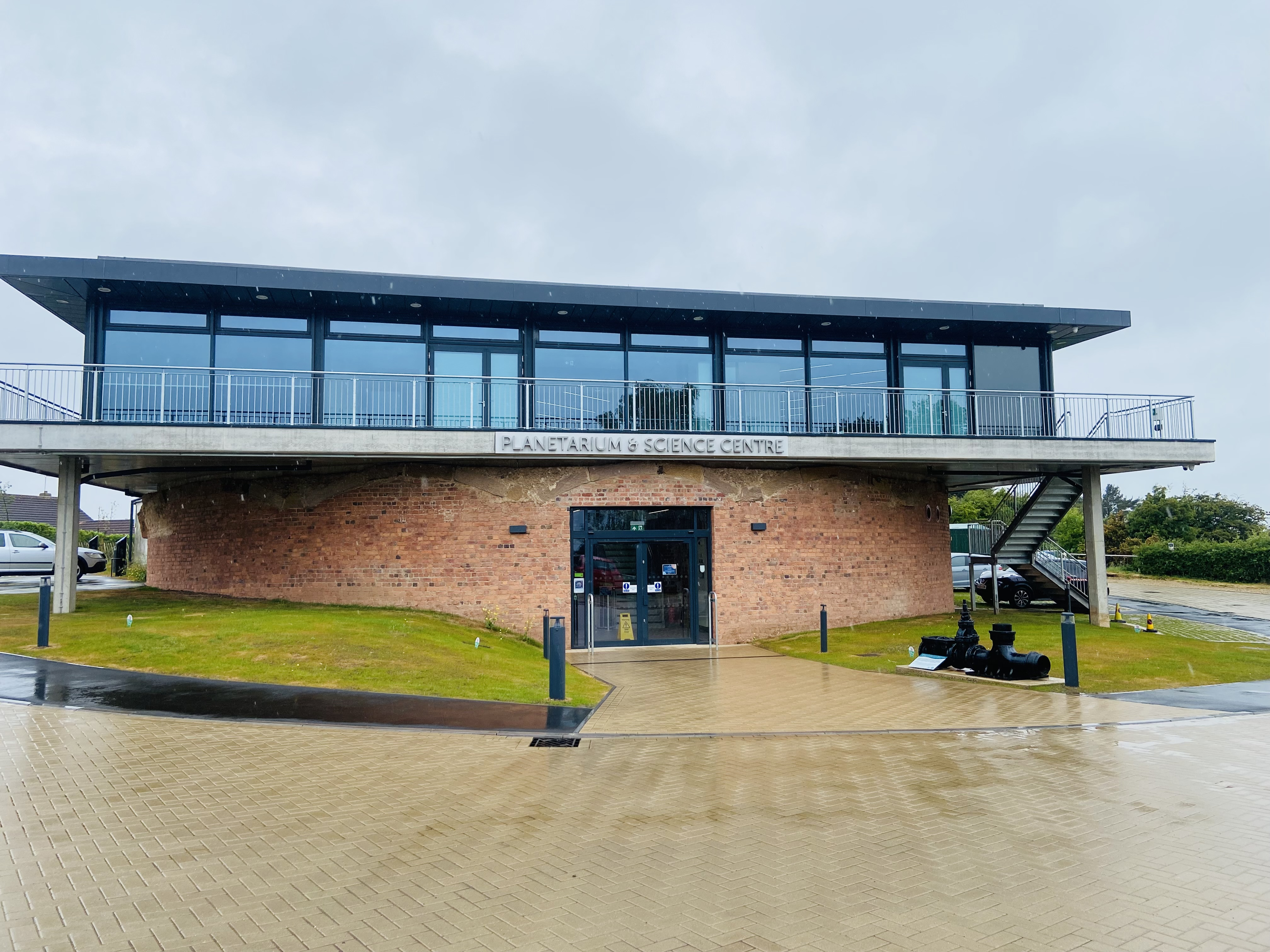
The new Planetarium facility

From 2023, a new development was constructed adjacent to the telescope atop a buried Victorian water reservoir, creating a planetarium and science discovery centre. Virtual reality will be used as part of the visitor-experience.

The water storage tank was excavated and converted into multi-function education and exhibition area, exposing and retaining the original multiple brick arches.

The facility was financed by £5.3 million in grants, National Lottery funding, the government's Towns Fund via Ashfield District Council and private donations.

== See also ==
- List of largest optical telescopes in the British Isles
