= The English Mechanic and World of Science =

- Categories: Engineering
- First issue: March 1865
- Final issue: October 1926
- Country: United Kingdom
- Language: English
- Website: Homepage
- OCLC: 1567968

The English Mechanic and World of Science, commonly referred to as English Mechanic, was a popular-science magazine, published weekly from 1865 to 1926, generally consisting of 24 pages. It was aimed at people interested in inventions and gadgets and new discoveries in science, technology, and mathematics. A regular chess column was also included, written by James Pierce.

== History ==
The magazine was founded as a 1d weekly The English Mechanic subtitled A Record of Mechanical Invention, Scientific and Industrial Progress, Building, Engineering, Manufactures, Arts &c. in 1865, and purchased in its first year of publication by John Passmore Edwards. Ebenezer J. Kibblewhite was a regular contributor, then became editor.

The publication featured a lively correspondence section, which occupied a quarter of its pages, each week headed by a quote from Montaigne.

I would have everyone write what he knows, and as much as he knows but no more . . . for such a person may have some particular knowledge and experience of the nature of such a river or such a fountain, [but] as to other things knows no more than everybody does . . .

The size and content grew rapidly in size and quality, and as of the issue of 12 January 1866 its price was increased to 2d. and had new, rather elegant, banner art, with its title shortened to English Mechanic, subtitled and Mirror of Science and Art, but pages titled English Mechanic and Mirror of Science.

Some time before 1876 it became English Mechanic subtitled and World of Science, with which is incorporated The Mechanic, Scientific Opinion, and The British & Foreign Mechanic. Pages were titled English Mechanic and World of Science

== Astronomy ==
The magazine popularized amateur telescope construction in the UK and later in the United States after the Reverend William Frederick Archdall Ellison's articles on the subject were reprinted in the Scientific American. A letter by William H. S. Monck published in the magazine on 12 July 1890 led to the formation of the British Astronomical Association.

== Motoring ==
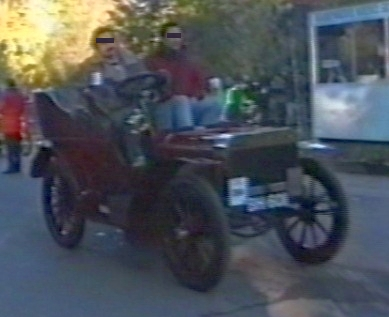
A surviving 1904 "English Mechanic" car

In the May 1899 issue there was an article by T Hyler-White (1871–1920) on a motor tricycle that could be powered by a 1.75 hp De Dion-Bouton. Following this and starting in January 1900 there appeared a series of 56 further articles entitled "A small car and how to build it", containing the plans for what was probably the UK's first kit car. The design was based on the Benz Velo, and it was suggested that a Benz engine should be used and to keep down costs various secondhand parts should be used, although some new castings were made available with a machining service if required.

Further series of articles appeared with more designs including in 1901 a steam car, in 1902 a steam-3 wheeler, in 1904 a 5 hp twin-cylinder car, in 1909 a single-cylinder engined runabout and finally in 1913 a cyclecar.

It is not known how many cars were built following the plans but at least four survive. They are collectively known today as "English Mechanics" but it is probable that a variety of names was used at the time.

== Issues ==
Several issues of The English Mechanic and World of Science are in the Internet Archive:

- 1870, vol XI
- 1878, vol XXVII
- 1882, vol XXXV
- 1883, vol XXXVI
- 1884, vol XXXVIII
- 1886, vol XLVII
- 1891, vol LIII
- 1892, vol LIV
- 1892, vol LV
