= William Stanley Monck =

William Stanley Monck may refer to:

- William Henry Stanley Monck (1839–1915), Irish astronomer and philosopher
- William Domville Stanley Monck (1763–1840), Anglo-Irish politician
