= David Ward (bass) =

Bass-baritone opera singer (1922–1983)

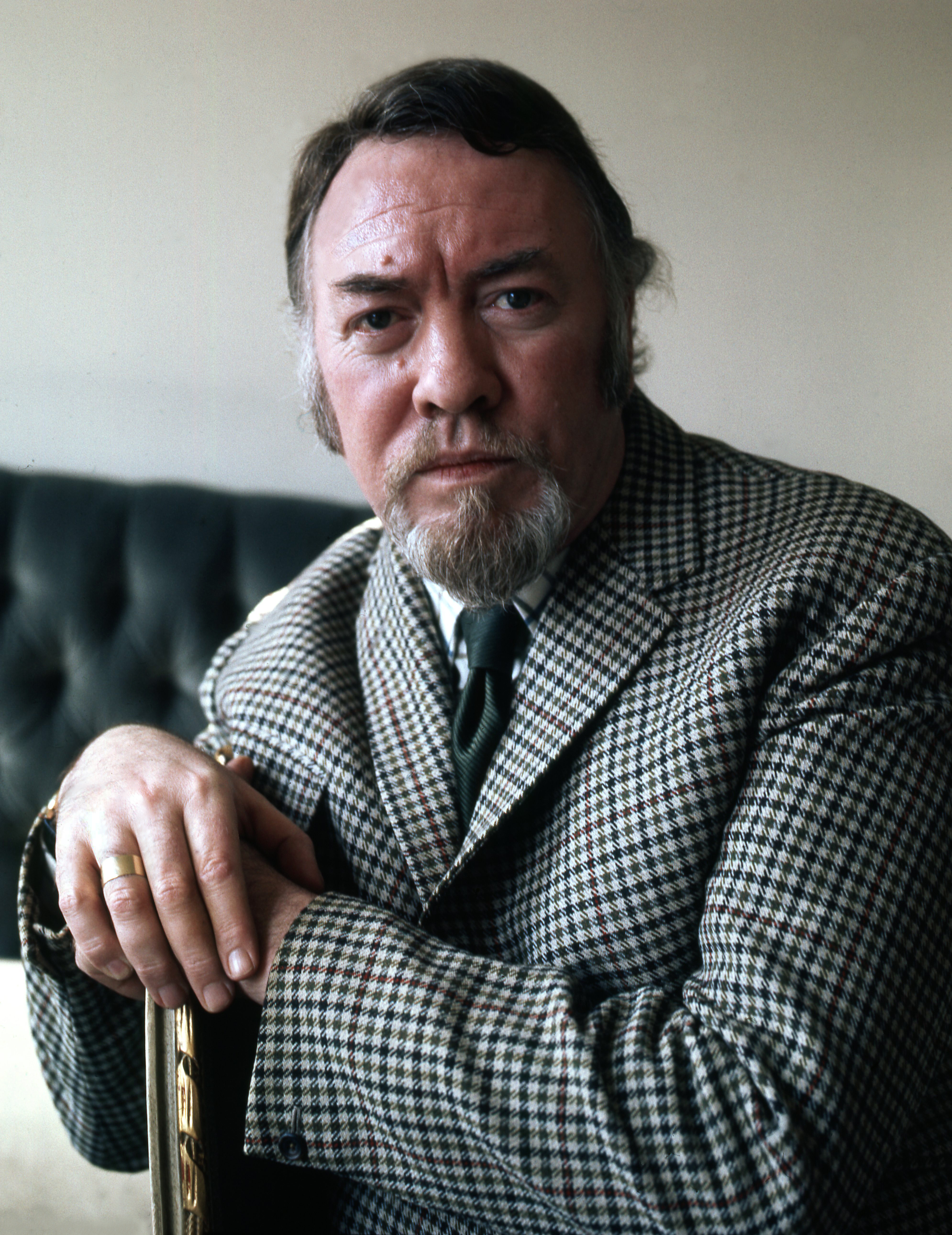
David Ward

David Ward CBE (3 July 1922 – 16 July 1983) was a Scottish Operatic bass.

Ward was born on 3 July 1922 in Dumbarton, Scotland. During World War II he was in the Royal Navy, and trained at the Royal College of Music under Clive Carey from between 1950 and 1952.

He appeared as a castaway on the BBC Radio programme Desert Island Discs on 29 May 1967, and was made a Commander of the Order of the British Empire (CBE) in 1972.

He sang regularly at the Royal Opera House, Covent Garden, including the role of Wotan in Wagner's Ring Cycle. His commercial recordings are few but include Wotan's Farewell from Die Walküre with the New Philharmonia Orchestra under George Hurst, released in 1971 on Decca PFS 4205.

One of his most celebrated recordings was as one of the soloists in Pierre Monteux's 1962 recording of Beethoven's Choral Symphony with the London Symphony Orchestra, alongside Elisabeth Söderström, Regina Resnik and Jon Vickers.

He died on 16 July 1983 in Dunedin, New Zealand, and was later described by Opera Scotland as "one of the most important Scottish singers of recent decades".
