= Dorothy Silk =

English soprano (1883 - 1942)

Dorothy Silk, c. 1920s

Dorothy (Ellen) Silk (4 May 1883 – 30 July 1942) was an English soprano, who was associated both with early Baroque music and with contemporary British music, particularly the works of Rutland Boughton and Gustav Holst.

== Life and career ==
Silk was born in Kings Norton, Worcestershire, England. She studied in Birmingham, then, following the advice of Theodore Lierhammer, in Vienna under Johannes Ress. She later confessed to having been initially "disappointed" by Ress, who insisted on her studying coloratura rather than her preferred Lieder by Hugo Wolf and Johannes Brahms. However she recognised that his training gave her a good vocal technique, and she relished the opportunities pre-First World War Vienna afforded to go to operas and concerts, also spending afternoons hearing Ferruccio Busoni playing the piano.

During the War, Silk worked as a housemaid in Highbury Hospital in Birmingham. Her singing won the admiration of the music editor and choral conductor William G. Whittaker, who in 1916 wrote to Gustav Holst warmly commending her as "a beautiful artist and woman" and urging him to send her any of his solo soprano works for her to study.

Silk made her London debut at Queen's Hall. Silk particularly built her reputation as a Bach singer, and gave pioneering chamber concerts (1921-6) in which she performed cantatas by Heinrich Schütz and Franz Tunder. She also sang at the Royal Albert Hall, Aeolian Hall and provincial centres. She was professor of singing at the Royal College of Music.

Silk also became associated with contemporary British music, and from 1921 she was involved with Rutland Boughton's Glastonbury Players. She sang in the public premiere of Holst's Savitri, staged at the Lyric Theatre, Hammersmith in 1921, then sang in its subsequent production in Covent Garden in 1923. She was much admired by the composer who expressed a preference for her as soloist for his Choral Symphony, which she sang with great success at its Leeds premiere on 7 October 1925. She also sang the premiere of Holst's Humbert Wolfe songs, which took place on 9 November 1929 at Louise Hanson-Dyer's house-warming in Paris.

In 1934 Silk joined Cuthbert Kelly's New English Singers and toured several times with the group in North America. Kelly said that her voice was "like a chameleon. It changes colour to an oboe when accompanied by one: same with a flute." Although Silk's voice, described as ‘light’ and ‘flexible’, was considered ideal for Bach, she also made a fine impression singing the soprano solo part in Verdi's Requiem. She died, aged 59, in Alvechurch, Worcestershire.
