= Alan Hunter (astronomer) =

English astronomer (1912–1995)

- Born: 9 September 1912; East Ham, Essex, England
- Died: 11 December 1995 (aged 83); Norfolk, England
- Education: Imperial College, London
- Scientific career
- Fields: Astronomy
- Workplaces: Royal Greenwich Observatory

Alan Hunter CBE (9 September 1912 – 11 December 1995) was an English astronomer who spent his career at the Royal Greenwich Observatory, serving as Director between 1973 and 1975.

== Early life ==
Alan Hunter was born in East Ham, then in Essex but now part of the London Borough of Newham, on 9 September 1912. He attended East Ham Grammar School, then studied physics at Imperial College London from where he graduated with a BSc degree. He remained at the college as a research student studying spectroscopy, leading to the award of a PhD degree.

== Assistant at the Royal Observatory, Greenwich ==
Hunter was appointed an assistant at the Royal Observatory, Greenwich in 1937, at a time when the observatory was under the directorship of Sir Harold Spencer Jones, the Astronomer Royal. On 11 January 1935 Hunter was elected to the fellowship of the Royal Astronomical Society. Hunter served as head of the observatory's Department of Astrometry and Astrophysics from 1937 to 1956. In 1937 he married Joan Portnell. He worked on measuring the distances of stars using photography with the Greenwich 26-inch diameter refracting telescope. He also measured temperatures of stars using a 36-inch diameter reflecting telescope.

During the Second World War, Hunter was transferred temporarily to the Royal Naval College, Greenwich, where he researched into the properties of metals. On 23 February 1944 Hunter joined the British Astronomical Association.

On returning to the Royal Observatory in 1946, he worked on measuring positions of minor planets and comets. He attempted to travel to observe a total solar eclipse in Brazil in 1947, but an aircraft he was travelling in crashed in Senegal. Hunter was injured but survived; some other passengers were killed.

== Work at the Royal Greenwich Observatory at Herstmonceux ==
As part of the observatory's relocation from London to the clearer and darker skies of Sussex, Hunter moved in 1956 to the Royal Greenwich Observatory's new site at Herstmonceux Castle. His department was split into two by the new Astronomer Royal, Sir Richard Woolley, with Hunter becoming head of the Department of Astrometry.

Hunter worked for six months at Mount Wilson Observatory in 1959–1960 to gain experience of using large telescopes, in preparation for the construction of a new telescope at Herstmonceux.

Alan Hunter was promoted to be Chief Assistant in 1961, when he was responsible for the Royal Greenwich Observatory's administration. In this role he supported the transfer of the running of the observatory from the British Admiralty to the Science Research Council. He was also responsible for completing the construction and the opening of the new Isaac Newton Telescope at Herstmonceux, a 98-inch diameter reflecting telescope that provided British astronomers access to modern observing facilities. He contributed to the search for a suitable site for the Anglo-Australian Observatory, a new observatory established jointly by the United Kingdom and Australian governments. He served on the Large Telescope Users' Panel for the Science Research Council.

Hunter became Deputy Director of the Royal Greenwich Observatory in 1967. When the Astronomer Royal, Sir Richard Woolley, retired in 1971, the United Kingdom government chose to split the post of Astronomer Royal from the observatory. The Astronomer Royal had been director of the Greenwich Observatory from its foundation in 1675 up to this time, but the government appointed Margaret Burbidge as Director, with the post of Astronomer Royal becoming an honorary title from then on. Hunter served as acting director of the observatory until Burbidge's arrival in 1972.

== Director of the Royal Greenwich Observatory ==
Margaret Burbidge resigned from the observatory in 1973, and Alan Hunter was appointed her successor as Director. This put him in charge of the institution as the latest in a series of eleven astronomers royal and two directors over nearly 300 years. He served in this position until his retirement in 1975, a period that included the observatory's 300th anniversary celebrations.

== Retirement ==
Alan Hunter and his wife retired to Norfolk. He died there on 11 December 1995.

== Honours and awards ==
- Vice-president, Royal Astronomical Society (1956–1957, 1965–1966, 1976–1977).
- President, British Astronomical Association (1956–1958).
- Commander of the Order of the British Empire (CBE) (1975).
