= James Wilson (Archdeacon of Manchester) =

British Archdeacon of Manchester (1836–1931)

James Maurice Wilson
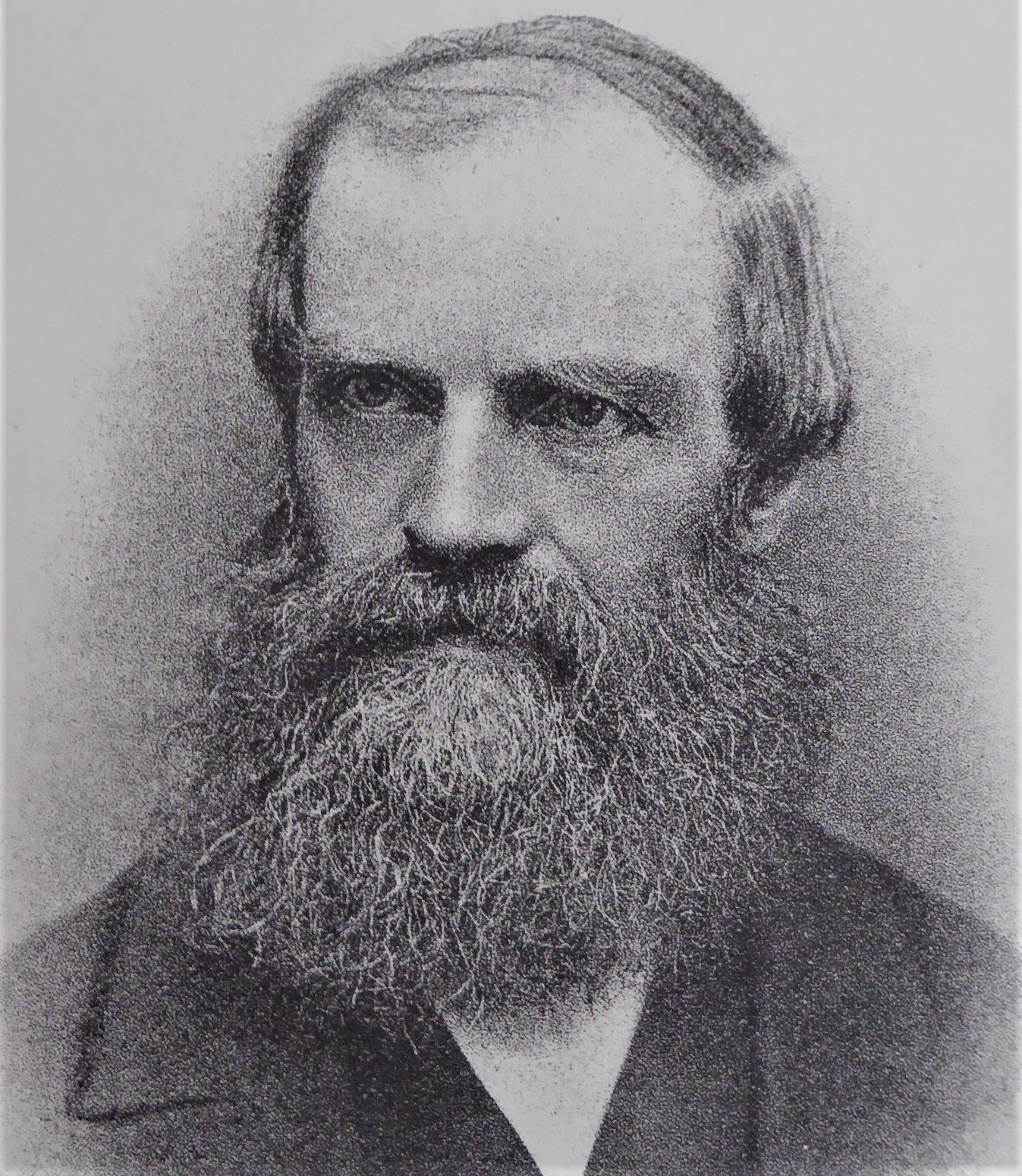
- James Wilson, Archdeacon of Manchester, 1890
- Born: 6 November 1836; Castletown, Isle of Man
- Died: 15 April 1931 (aged 94); Steep, Hampshire, England
- Education: King William's College; Sedbergh School
- Alma mater: St. John's College, Cambridge
- Occupations: Priest, theologian & teacher
- Spouse(s): Annie Elizabeth Moore (m. 1868; died 1878) Georgina Mary Talbot (m. 1883)
- Children: 4
- Father: Edward Wilson
- Relatives: Mona Wilson (daughter); Arnold Talbot Wilson (son); Hugh Stanley Wilson (son); Steuart Wilson (son)

James Maurice Wilson (6 November 1836, Castletown, Isle of Man – 15 April 1931, Steep, Hampshire) was a British priest in the Church of England as well as a theologian, teacher and astronomer.

== Early life ==
Wilson and his twin brother, Edward Pears Wilson, attended King William's College on the Isle of Man from August 1848 to midsummer 1853 (his twin died in December 1856). Their father Edward, vicar of Nocton in Lincolnshire, had earlier been headmaster there. According to his autobiography, Wilson had a rather unhappy time at King William's College. He later studied at Sedbergh School (between 1853 and 1855).

Wilson entered St John's College, Cambridge, in 1855, where he was Senior Wrangler in 1859. He received a Master of Arts degree in 1862 and was a fellow from 1859 to 1868.

== Career ==
Wilson was a major figure in the development and reform of Victorian public schools and promoted the teaching of science, which had until then been neglected. He was maths and science master at Rugby School from 1859 to 1879 and headmaster of Clifton College from 1879 to 1890.

He made astronomical observations (particularly of double stars) at Temple Observatory at Rugby with his former student George Mitchell Seabroke. Temple Observatory was named after Frederick Temple, headmaster of Rugby School, who later became Bishop of Exeter and Archbishop of Canterbury.

Wilson was encouraged by Temple to write the textbook Elementary Geometry, which was published in 1868. Until that time, Euclid's Elements had remained the standard textbook used in British schools.

With Joseph Gledhill and Edward Crossley, Wilson co-wrote Handbook of Double Stars in 1879, which became a standard reference work in astronomy. His astronomical observations seem to have come to an end after he left Rugby and went to Clifton.

While at Clifton, he successfully pushed for the creation of St Agnes Park in Bristol, as part of a plan to improve the lives of the urban poor.

In April 1890, he addressed girls at St Leonards School, stressing the connection of religion with their possible role as university students and social workers whilst assisting women such as Octavia Hill to alleviate the plight of the "labouring masses, and in particular the (poor) women and girls of England".

After his teaching career, he became Vicar of Rochdale, Archdeacon of Manchester from 1890 to 1905, a canon of Worcester Cathedral from 1905 to 1926 and vice-dean of the cathedral. He was Hulsean lecturer at Cambridge in 1898; Lady Margaret Preacher at Cambridge in 1900; and Lecturer in Pastoral Theology at Cambridge in 1902.

He wholeheartedly accepted the theory of evolution and its implications for the literal interpretation of the Bible. He gave two lectures in 1892 in which he accepted Darwinism and argued that it was compatible with a higher view of Christianity; the lectures were published by the Society for the Promotion of Christian Knowledge, which had a few years earlier strongly opposed Darwinian ideas.

In 1921, he served for one year as president of The Mathematical Association of the UK.

In 1925 he wrote an essay entitled "The Religious Effect of the Idea of Evolution". He wrote a number of books, including Life after Death "with replies by Sir Arthur Conan Doyle" in 1920. In addition to spiritual works, he co-wrote an astronomy book on double stars (mentioned above) and mathematical books on geometry and conic sections. He contributed the article "On two fragments of geometrical treatises found in Worcester Cathedral" to the Mathematical Gazette (March 1911, p. 19).

== Family ==
In 1868 he married his first wife, Annie Elizabeth Moore. She was a cousin once removed of Arthur William Moore, a proponent of the Manx language. Their first child was the leading civil servant Mona Wilson. His first wife died after giving birth to their fourth child in 1878.

In 1883 he married his second wife, Georgina Mary Talbot. Their sons included Sir Arnold Wilson, who became a British colonial administrator in Baghdad and was killed in action in World War II; 2nd Lt. Hugh Stanley Wilson (1885–1915), who died in World War I and is buried in the military cemetery at Hébuterne, Pas de Calais; and the tenor Sir Steuart Wilson. From his notes, Arnold and Steuart published the posthumous James M. Wilson: An Autobiography (London, Sidgwick & Jackson, 1932).

Academic offices
Preceded by John Percival	Headmaster of Clifton College; 1879–1890	Succeeded by Michael George Glazebrook
Preceded by Sir Edmund Taylor Whittaker	President of the Mathematical Association; 1921	Succeeded by Thomas Little Heath
