= William Maw =

British civil engineer and astronomer

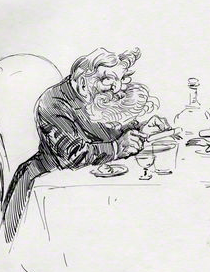
- A caricature of Maw by Harry Furniss
- Born: 6 December 1838; Scarborough, North Yorkshire
- Died: 19 March 1924 (aged 85)
- Education: Syke's School, Mechanics' Institute
- Engineering career
- Discipline: Civil
- Institutions: Institution of Civil Engineers (president), Institution of Mechanical Engineers (president), Civil and Mechanical Engineers' Society (president), British Astronomical Association (president)

William Henry Maw (6 December 1838 – 19 March 1924) was a British civil engineer and astronomer. Born into a seafaring family and orphaned at age 16, Maw was taken into the workshops of the Eastern Counties Railway as an assistant before progressing to the design office as a draughtsman. He was made the head of the office and designed the first outside cylinder locomotive for use in India. In 1865 he founded the journal Engineering and remained an editor for the rest of his life. He left the railway and became a consulting engineer his many works including printing presses for several newspapers and magazines. He was president of the Civil and Mechanical Engineers' Society, the Institution of Mechanical Engineers and the Institution of Civil Engineers.

Maw was also a keen astronomer and was a Fellow of the Royal Astronomical Society (RAS) with a particular interest in double stars. He co-founded the British Astronomical Association for amateur astronomers and served as its treasurer and president. He later became a council member, treasurer and president of the RAS. During the First World War he served his country as a committee member for the Ministry of Munitions and upon the board of the National Physical Laboratory.

== Early life ==
Maw was born in Scarborough on 6 December 1838 into a seafaring family, his father was a captain of the Merchant navy and both of his grandfathers were captains of the Royal Navy. He was privately educated at Syke's School in his hometown and it was there that he befriended Edward Harland who would later co-found the Harland and Wolff shipbuilding company. In 1853 his father was lost at sea, leaving the family without an income, his mother died shortly afterwards, leaving William an orphan at age 16.

== Engineer ==
In March 1855 he was taken on as an assistant first in the carriage and then the locomotive workshops of the Eastern Counties Railway at Stratford Works. During this period he studied drawing at the Mechanics' Institute, later to become Birkbeck College, as a result of this he was occasionally requested to work in the drawing office. He was so talented at drawing that in 1859, at the age of 21, he was made head of the office. In this period he designed locomotives for the East Indian Railway Company, his design being the first outside cylinder engine in use in the country, the valve gears used in these locomotives was the subject of a report to the 1862 International Exhibition.

In 1865 he left Eastern Counties and, with Zerah Colburn, founded the journal Engineering. He would remain an editor of the journal for the rest of his life. Around this time he set up a private engineering consultancy which specialised in workshop and factory design and notably he was responsible for the lay out of the printing presses of the Daily Telegraph, The Field and The Queen. He was honoured by several professional institutions for his contributions and was made president of the Civil and Mechanical Engineers' Society in 1863, of the Institution of Mechanical Engineers in 1901 and of the Institution of Civil Engineers in 1922. When he presented his inaugural address to the members of the latter institution he demonstrated full knowledge of recent developments in the industry, including X-ray technology; new metal alloys and renovations in turbines and gearing systems; despite being 83 years old at this time.

== Astronomer ==
Maw was a keen astronomer keeping two observatories at his house which he used to record measurements of double stars over a period of twenty years, the results of which were published in the Royal Astronomical Society (RAS) journal. He was made a fellow of the RAS on 14 December 1888. He co-founded the British Astronomical Association, an amateur astronomy association, and served as its treasurer from 1890 to 1913 and its president from 1898 to 1900. In 1892 he was elected as a member of the council of the RAS, serving as treasurer from 1900 to 1905 and as president from 1905 to 1907.

== Later life ==
Maw was created an honorary Doctor of Laws by the University of Glasgow in 1909 for his contributions to mechanical engineering. He served upon the board of the National Physical Laboratory and on several committees for the Ministry of Munitions during the First World War. He died at home on 19 March 1924 and was survived by his wife, three sons and six daughters.

Professional and academic associations
| Preceded by Sir William Henry White | President of the Institution of Mechanical Engineers; 1901–1902 | Succeeded by Joseph Hartley Wicksteed |
| Preceded by William Barton Worthington | President of the Institution of Civil Engineers; November 1922 – November 1923 | Succeeded by Charles Langbridge Morgan |
