= Simon Mitton =

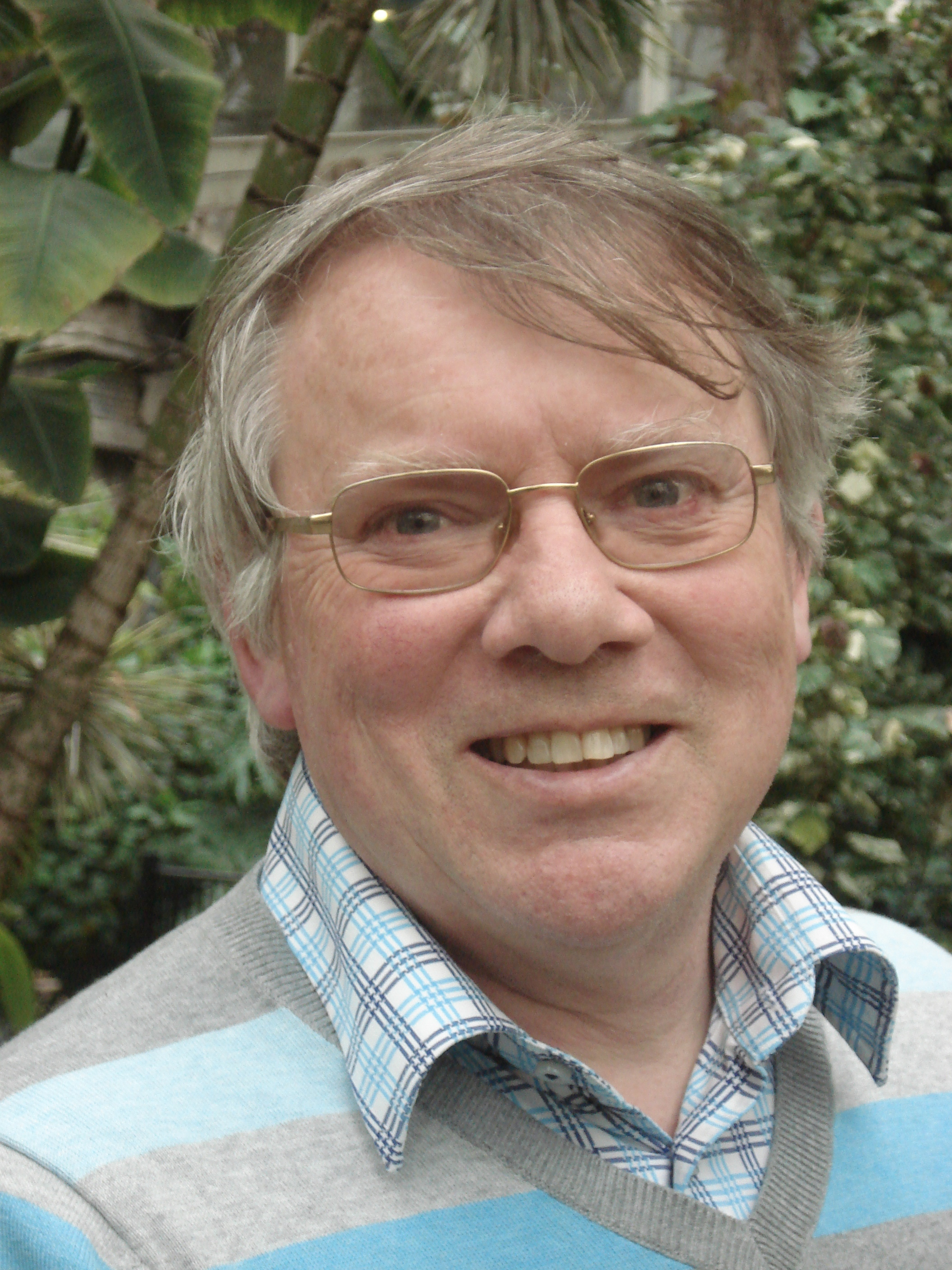
- Mitton in 2013
- Born: 18 December 1946 (age 79); Bristol, England
- Education: Trinity College, Oxford; St. Edmund's College, Cambridge
- Scientific career
- Fields: Astronomer
- Workplaces: University of Cambridge
- Doctoral advisor: John Shakeshaft

Simon Mitton (born 18 December 1946) is a British astronomer and writer. He is based at St Edmund's College, Cambridge. He has written numerous astronomical works. The most well known of these is his biography of fellow Cambridge astronomer Fred Hoyle.

== Career ==
Mitton was elected to Council of the Royal Astronomical Society 2012–2016, and chairman of the RAS library committee. He is a College Fellow of the Department of the History and Philosophy of Science, Cambridge.

He is a founder director of Total Astronomy Limited, a company based in Cambridge that provides media services for the astronomy and space industries.

Earlier in his career, while employed by the Cambridge University Press, he was the editor in question when Stephen Hawking famously put the success of his bestseller A Brief History of Time down to advice from his editor that for every equation in the book the readership would be halved. As a result, the book included only a single equation, $E = mc^2$.

Jointly with his wife Jacqueline Mitton, he occasionally gives astronomy lectures on cruise ships.

== Education ==
Mitton studied physics and astrophysics. His undergraduate studies were at the Clarendon Laboratory and Trinity College, Oxford. For his doctoral research in high-energy astrophysics, he studied at the Cavendish Laboratory, Cambridge, under Nobel Laureate Sir Martin Ryle FRS. His postdoctoral career started under Sir Fred Hoyle FRS at the Institute of Astronomy, Cambridge.

== Research ==
Recently his principal research project has been in the history of astronomy, now his academic field. He has completed a large biography of the British astronomer Sir Fred Hoyle (1915–2001), published in April 2005, and reissued in 2011.

== Honours ==
Awards

- Fellow, St Edmund's College, Cambridge (1973)
- Fifth Champness Lecturer, Worshipful Company of Spectacle Makers (1975)
- 35th Barringer Lecturer, University of Arkansas (March 2009)

Named after him

- Asteroid 4027 Mitton (Awarded jointly with Jacqueline Mitton)
