= Frederick William Levander =

British astronomer

- Born: 1839; Exmouth, United Kingdom
- Died: 20 December 1916 (aged 76–77); Camden Square, London
- Scientific career
- Fields: Astronomy

Frederick William Levander (1839 - 1916) was a British scientist, astronomer and school teacher.

== Biography ==
Frederick William Levander was born in Exmouth, United Kingdom in 1839, the sixth child of James Levi (c.1801-1857, who changed his surname to Levander in about 1826) and Julia Jones (c.1803-1865). He was educated at Miss Knox's school, 1 Crescent Row, Southernhay, Exeter, Devon, from about 1836 to 1850, and then at Exeter Grammar School from Easter 1850. He hoped to go to Exeter College, Oxford, but did not have the favour of his headmaster or financial support, so began his teaching career without a degree. He died on 20 December 1916 in Camden Square, London.

== Career ==
=== Teaching ===
Levander was initially a private tutor, living at Maidenhead, Berkshire, in 1861. Later, he was one of the Assistant Classical Masters at University College School in Gower Street from 1869 to 1872. From 1878 to 1909 he taught at HeathBrow School.

=== Freemasonry ===
He was also a freemason and participated in several Masonic associations. He first joined the Wiltshire Lodge in Devizes, alongside his brother, Henry Charles Levander, in 1861, and the Oriental Lodge in Constantinople (now Istanbul) in the same year. He later joined the Campbell Lodge in Bushey Park and Hampton Court, Middlesex, in 1873; the Henry Levander Lodge, named in honour of his brother, in Harrow, Middlesex, in 1906; and the Quatuor Coronati Lodge in 1912.

=== Astronomy ===
He started making astronomical observations in 1860 using a small telescope.

He made several contributions to British astronomical journals, particularly the Journal of the British Astronomical Association.

He served as editor of the British Astronomical Association journal.

== See also ==
- Journal of the British Astronomical Association
- British Astronomical Association
