= Mona Wilson =

British public servant (1872–1954)

Mona Wilson, 1911

Mona Wilson (29 May 1872 – 26 October 1954) was a British public servant and author. After voluntary social work, seeking to improve the conditions of working women in deprived industrial areas, she joined the Civil Service in 1911, and became one of the first women in Britain to earn equal pay with her male colleagues. She left the civil service in 1919 and pursued a literary career.

Wilson is known for her scholarly work, including literary biographies of William Blake (1927) and Sir Philip Sidney (1931). Women writers of earlier generations were of particular interest to her, and she published two studies of 18th- and 19th-century female authors, including Jane Austen, Fanny Trollope and 15 other women writers of the period (1924 and 1938).

== Early years ==
Wilson was born in Hillmorton Road, Rugby, the eldest of the four children of the Rev James Wilson (later headmaster of Clifton College) and his first wife, Annie Elizabeth née Moore. (Note: Annie Wilson died in 1879, aged 42, and James Wilson remarried in 1883. There were four children of the second marriage, including the politician Arnold Wilson and the singer Steuart Wilson.) She was educated at Clifton High School, Bristol and St Leonard's School, St Andrews, before going up to Newnham College, Cambridge in 1892. Her father resigned from Clifton and was appointed vicar of Rochdale and archdeacon of Manchester, and on leaving Cambridge in 1896, Wilson joined her family in the industrial north and met labour and social conditions at close quarters.

== Social work ==
Wilson became interested in social and industrial problems, and joined the Women's Trade Union League. The league's president was Lady Dilke, through whom Wilson came to know other women active in the movement for social reform. They included Mary Macarthur, Lucy Streatfeild, May Tennant and Gertrude Tuckwell. In 1899 Wilson became Secretary of the League, and in the same year, commissioned by the Industrial Law Committee, she compiled a handbook of the legal regulations governing the working conditions of women employed in factories, workshops, shops, and laundries. It was intended to inform officials and social workers of the legal rights of women workers, and the need to report breaches to the factory inspectorate.

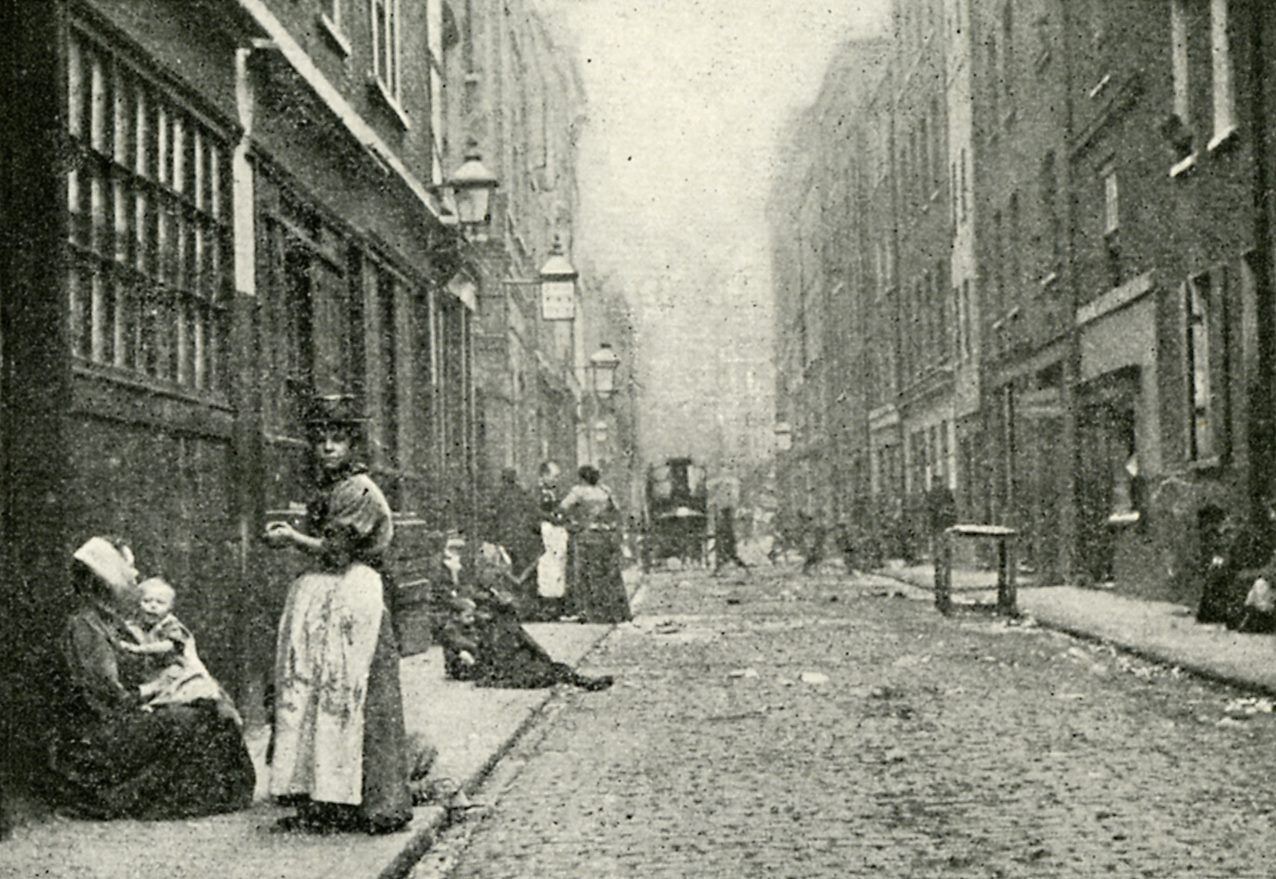
East End slum, 1902

In 1902 Wilson took part in an investigation into social conditions in West Ham in the East End of London, and in 1904, with Mary Lily Walker, she led an inquiry into housing, income, and employment in Dundee. It covered health, housing conditions, family incomes and employment, and was, according to The Times, one of the most exhaustive social studies ever undertaken. The investigation found that Dundee's industry relied on cheap female labour:

Between the ages of 20 and 45 in Dundee … the married woman is often the principal, sometimes the sole, wage-earner, and that the obligation both to bear and to support a family is an unnatural condition which leads to the usual consequences – broken down mothers in early life, and ill-nourished, rickety children, who develop into weedy, unhealthy men and women.

The work took its toll on Wilson. She described Dundee as "the most depressing place you can possibly imagine", and was not confident that the ills revealed in the report would be adequately remedied. Mona was sceptical about the value of votes for women: "I have always found the ordinary middle class woman the worst enemy of the questions I care about which does not induce me to be particularly anxious that she should have a vote."

== Public servant ==
Wilson in 1917

In 1909 the Trade Boards Act set up boards to regulate some of the most exploitative industries, enforcing minimum wages and conditions. Wilson was appointed as a member of the chain-making and paper-box making boards. She also served on the Home Office departmental committee on industrial accidents.

In 1911 Wilson was appointed to the National Insurance Commission in 1911 on a seven-year contract. Her annual salary of £1,000 made her the highest-paid woman civil servant of the time and one of the first British women to receive equal pay with men. (Note: Equal pay for men and women in comparable jobs was not the norm in the British civil service until 1961.)

Wilson joined the National Organising Committee for War Savings in 1916, coordinating women's organisations to share news about government saving schemes. In 1917 Wilson was seconded to the newly formed Ministry of Reconstruction, where she was the first woman assistant secretary. She helped to coordinate the voluntary and professional sectors of women's social work during and just after the First World War, and took part in the early stages of establishing a Ministry of Health. She became disillusioned by the failure of the ministry to achieve social reforms, hampered by the obstruction of "departments more concerned with economy". Her term of appointment came to an end in 1919. She served from then until 1929 as a member of the Industrial Relief Research Board, and was a local magistrate, but her main pursuits were henceforward literary.

== Literature ==
=== 1909 to 1930 ===
Four of the muses in Wilson's 1924 book – clockwise from top left: Sydney Morgan, Charlotte Lennox, Fanny Trollope and Sarah Coleridge

Wilson's literary career had begun before she became a civil servant. In 1909 under the pen name Monica Moore, she wrote a short story, "The Ordeal", printed in The Nation; it featured the miseries of mill workers. The following year she published a novel, The Story of Rosalind Retold from her Diary, a tale about of a talented woman writer and artist whose short life was divided between the arts and social work. In the Dictionary of Literary Biography, Margaret Carter describes the heroine as "a restless and haunted woman, whose fall from her galloping horse may have been her means of joining her recently deceased young son".

In 1924 Wilson made her first sortie into literary biography, with These Were Muses, a brief introduction to the works of nine 18th- and 19th-century women writers whose renown, according to Wilson's preface, "has faded or … remained unfulfilled." Wilson observes that her book is "not intended for the student, but for the curious general reader who will have come across the names of the subjects of these papers in histories or literature." She gives brief biographies of, and quotes extensively from, the playwrights Susannah Centlivre and Frances Sheridan; the novelists Charlotte Lennox, Sydney Morgan and Jane Porter; Sara Coleridge, author of children's verse; Hester Chapone, writer of conduct books; Mary Ann Kelty, religious writer; and Fanny Trollope, novelist and travel writer.

Wilson's first full-length biography, The Life of William Blake, was published in 1927, the centenary of the subject's death. Wilson concentrated on Blake's life-story and his writings, although she did not neglect his paintings. The New York Times thought her prose "rather uninspired", but found the book "careful and impartial … certainly the best and most authoritative life of Blake yet written". When a revised edition was published in 1949, The Manchester Guardian commented, "Miss Wilson may have assumed rather too easily the unity of mystic, poet, and artist in Blake, but she has told his story more fully and sensibly than anyone else."

In the late 1920s Wilson corresponded on a literary topic with the writer G. M. Young, who before their retirements from the public service had been a colleague at the Ministry of Reconstruction. She asked him down for the weekend to her house at Oare, near Marlborough, Wiltshire. As their publisher, Rupert Hart-Davis, put it in 1956: "To cut a long story short, he stayed there for twenty-five years, until M.W. died a year or two ago. There was, so far as I know, no just cause or impediment why they shouldn't have married, but they just didn't. I'm sure their relationship was entirely intellectual and companionable."

=== 1930s ===
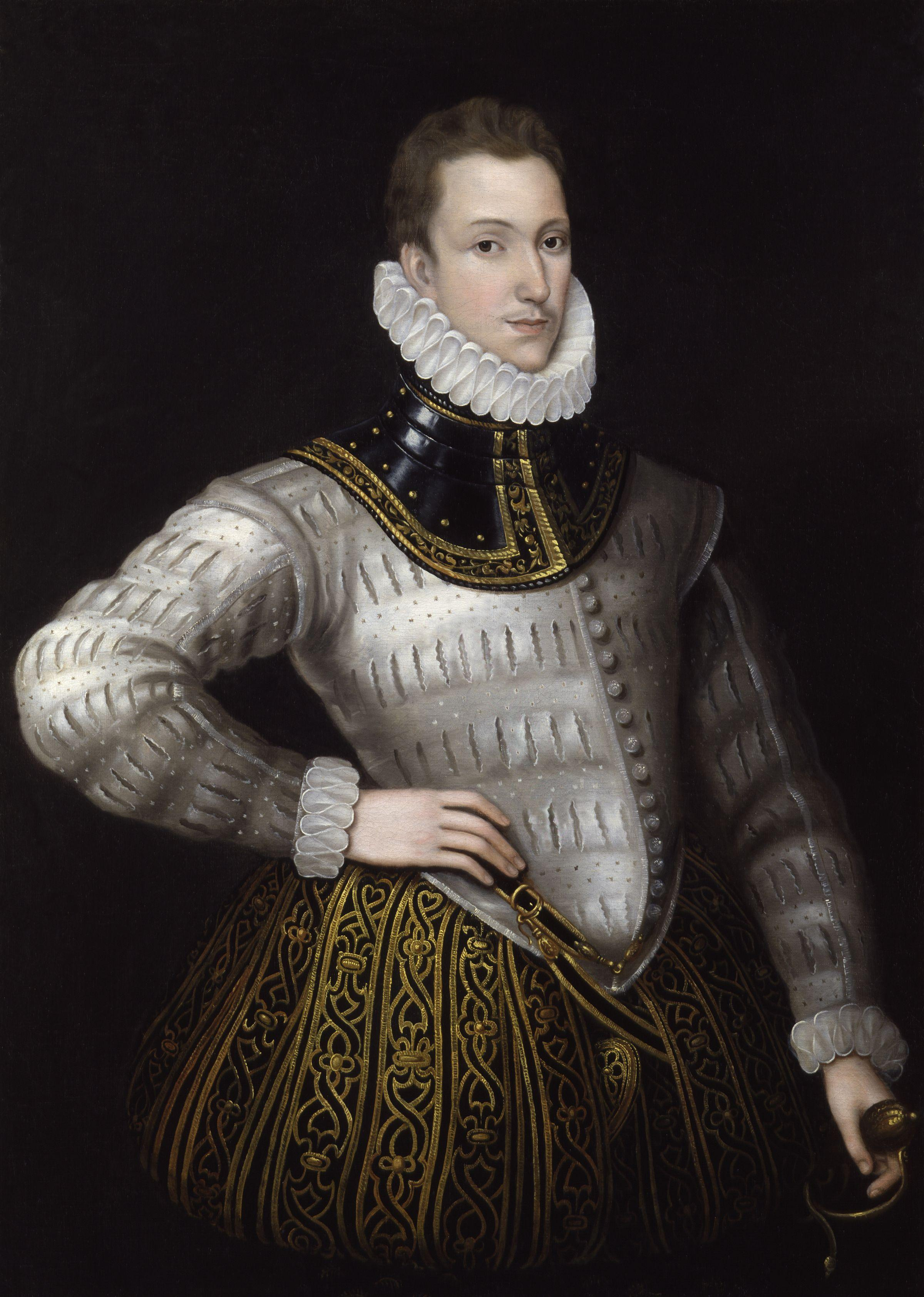
Sir Philip Sidney

After a four-year gap Wilson's next book was a study of Sir Philip Sidney (1931), which combined a biography with literary criticism of his writings, contrasting his disciplined poetry with his elaborate and ornamented prose style. The book was praised by reviewers, although her own prose style was thought "here and there rather dryly matter-of-fact". The Times concluded its review:

To moderns Philip Sidney is chiefly the hero who gave his cup of water to a poor fellow in worse case than himself and the poet who wrote some of the most beautiful love-poetry in the language. The great deal more that he meant to his own age can nowhere better be learned than from Miss Wilson's wise and well-wrought book.

In 1932 Wilson was made an Associate of Newnham College. In the same year she produced the first of two books for the "Short Biographies" series of her publisher, Peter Davies. Her Queen Elizabeth, a 180-page study of Elizabeth I, was moderately well reviewed. The New York Times thought Wilson's attempt to disentangle Elizabeth's personality from her actions led to "an outline portrait made of broken lines that do not quite sufficiently explain themselves". The Spectator commented, "No one, after reading Miss Wilson's book, will fail to understand how it was that Elizabeth's reign is one of the most famous in English History, and still the most glamorous of all." Wilson's Queen Victoria the following year was politely received, with reservations as to whether the author gave her subject enough credit for "native intelligence and political common sense".

Wilson contributed a chapter on holidays and travel to the two-volume Early Victorian England edited by Young and published in 1934. In 1935 she wrote the opening and closing chapters of R. B. Lambert's Grand Tour: A Journey in the Tracks of the Age of Aristocracy (1935). Reviewing the book, James Laver remarked that it took the reader from the days of the Wife of Bath to those of John Ruskin. In 1937 Wilson contributed a chapter on Mary Wollstonecraft to Bonamy Dobrée's collection of essays From Anne to Victoria. (Note: There were 45 essays in the book, by authors including W. H. Auden, W. A. Darlington, T. S. Eliot, Graham Greene, James Laver, George Santayana, John Sparrow, Stephen Spender, John Summerson and Rebecca West.)

Jane Austen and Some Contemporaries (1938) comprises biographies of Jane Austen and seven other female writers of the period. (Note: The contemporaries, each with a chapter of her own, were Mary Martha Butt, Eliza Fletcher, Harriet Grote, Mary Anne Schimmelpenninck, Mary Somerville, Charlotte Elizabeth Tonna and Anne Woodrooffe.) The book was described by The Manchester Guardian as very thorough in its understanding of the people of Austen's time, though a little difficult to follow for a reader unfamiliar with the time period. In this book, Wilson ranks Austen as at least the equal, if not the superior of Mary Wollstonecraft in advocacy of equal rights for women. Wilson's biographer Elaine Harrison comments that this demonstrates Wilson's "preference for a more subtle advocacy of women's claims for equal consideration".

=== Last years ===
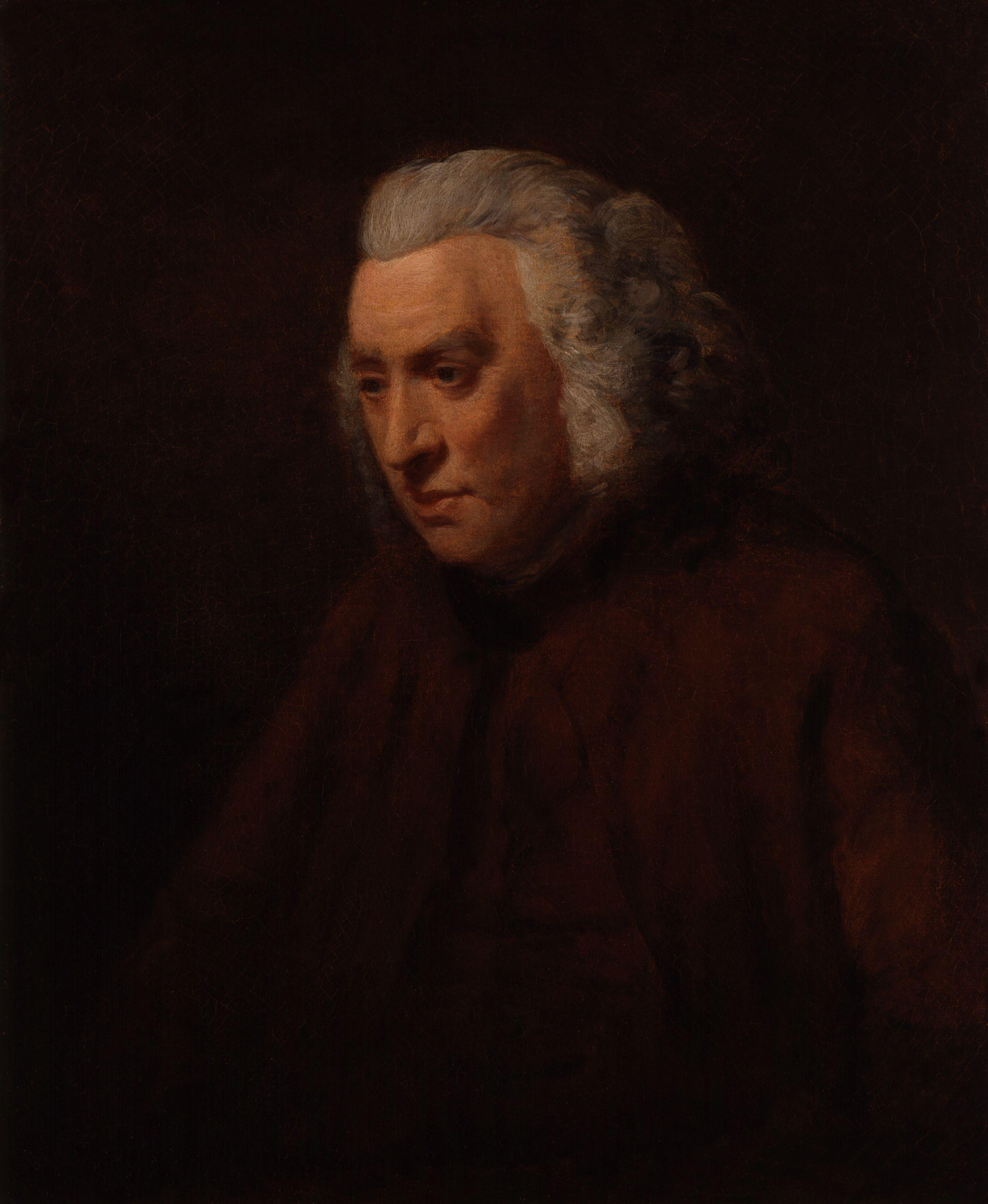
Samuel Johnson, the subject of Wilson's final book

By the end of the Second World War most of Wilson's books were out of print. Hart-Davis, who already published Young's books, commissioned revised editions of The Life of William Blake (1948) and Sir Philip Sidney (1950), and Wilson's last book, an anthology, Johnson – Prose and Poetry (1950). This was a 900-page collection of Samuel Johnson's writings. The prose included excerpts from Rasselas, A Journey to the Western Isles, the Letter to Lord Chesterfield, the preface and plan of the Dictionary, Lives of the Poets and essays. Some of Johnson's poetry – both Latin and English – was also included. The Times Literary Supplement said it was "a book for which the lover of Johnson may be grateful and one, moreover, likely to make more lovers of Johnson".

Wilson died at a nursing home in Putney, London, on 26 October 1954 at the age of 82.

== Publications ==
- Our Industrial Laws: Working Women in Factories, Workshops, Shops and Laundries and How to Help Them. London: Duckworth. 1899. OCLC 923922965.
- These Were Muses. London: Sidgwick and Jackson. 1924. OCLC 884049119.
- The Life of William Blake. London: The Nonesuch Press. 1927. OCLC 973439003.
- Sir Philip Sidney. London: Duckworth. 1931. OCLC 753238584.
- Queen Elizabeth. London: Peter Davies Ltd. 1932. OCLC 606433685.
- Victoria, Queen of Great Britain. London: Peter Davies Ltd. 1933. OCLC 2194597.
- Jane Austen and Some Contemporaries. London: Cresset Press. 1938. OCLC 222021464.
- Johnson – Prose and Poetry. London: Rupert Hart-Davis. 1950. OCLC 852820674.

== Notes, references and sources ==
=== Sources ===
- Carter, Margaret (1995). "Wilson, Mona". In Steven Serafin (ed.). Dictionary of Literary Biography. Vol. 149. Detroit: Gale. ISBN 978-0-8103-5710-5.
- Dobrée, Bonamy (1937). From Anne to Victoria;. London: Cassell. OCLC 22635473.
- Lyttelton, George; Rupert Hart-Davis (1978). The Lyttelton Hart-Davis Letters, Volume I. London: John Murray. ISBN 978-0-7195-3478-2.
- Thane, Pat (2010). Unequal Britain: Equalities in Britain since 1945. London: Continuum. ISBN 978-1-84706-298-7.
- Whitehead, Angus (2012). "Blake 2.0". In Steve Clark; Tristanne Connolly; Jason Whittaker (eds.). William Blake in Twentieth-Century Art, Music and Culture. London: Palgrave Macmillan. ISBN 978-0-230-28033-5.
- Wilson, Mona (1924). These Were Muses. London: Sidgwick and Jackson. OCLC 3352056.
- Wilson, Mona (1938). Jane Austen and Some Contemporaries. London: Cresset Press. OCLC 1131163851.
- Young, G. M. (1934). Early Victorian England, 1830–1865. London: Oxford University Press. OCLC 977600890.
