= English Singers =

English vocal group

The English Singers, co-founded in 1920 by the singers Cuthbert Kelly and Steuart Wilson, was a vocal group which specialised in early English music. The group made dozens of recordings of English madrigals between 1921 and 1955.

== Background and development ==
In 1917 the bass singer Cuthbert Kelly founded a quartet of singers, having previously staged wartime concerts at the church of St Martin-in-the-Fields. In 1920 the group was augmented to six singers, the members being Flora Mann, Winifred Whelen, Lillian Berger, Steuart Wilson, Clive Carey and Cuthbert Kelly himself. The ensemble gave its first concert on 28 February at London's Aeolian Hall. As the music scholar Edmund Fellowes reported, the concert was a great success: "It was the first occasion upon which in modern times madrigals were properly interpreted on a concert platform, and it was the first appearance in public of The English Singers, though it was not till later in the year that they took that title. The audience was entranced. Here was something quite new to an English audience and they rose to it." Two further concerts were arranged that year at the Aeolian Hall, and another 15 concerts were given elsewhere before the end of 1920.

The group habitually performed seated around a table, which Steuart Wilson initially claimed was the standard practice for singing madrigals in Elizabethan times. It was only years later, after several other madrigal ensembles had adopted the practice in the belief it was authentic, that Wilson admitted that the group's practice simply was expediency to avoid his having to carry six music stands on public transport across London for rehearsals.

In January 1922 the group, by now named The English Singers, visited Prague, accompanied by Adrian Boult and Arthur Bliss, performing in the second half of a concert in the Smetana Hall, the first half being the Czech Philharmonic performing contemporary British music conducted by Boult and Bliss: according to Michael Kennedy, the singers enjoyed "the biggest success". That April the English Singers toured Berlin, Prague and Vienna, again with Boult and Bliss. Another tour in April 1929 took the group to Czechoslovakia, Germany and Holland.

The group made its first recording with His Master's Voice in December 1921. For William Byrd's tercentenary in 1923 the group recorded five discs, singing one voice to a part. The early English music scholar, E.H. Fellowes, recalled that the English Singers' recording of Byrd's Short Service Magnificat, made on 29 January 1923, "was a revelation in its beauty when rightly performed; it exerted a widespread influence in church-music circles." On the other hand, reviewing The English Singers' earliest discs, Harry Haskell notes the "lack of rhythmic definition" in the performances, though he allows that this may have been due, as Steuart Wilson recalled, to the acoustic process where they had to record with "six noses crowded into a single horn". There was, says Haskell, an improvement with the group's electric recordings, though their singing still suffered from "flaccid rhythms and unfocused tone".

In October 1924, Whelen, Wilson and Carey were replaced by Nellie Carson, Norman Stone and Norman Notley. This group toured America in 1925, the first of many such tours.

== The New English Singers ==
In October 1932 Kelly formed a new group, the New English Singers, whose repertoire was again Elizabethan madrigals but also including contemporary works by Gustav Holst and Ralph Vaughan Williams. The members were Dorothy Silk and Nellie Carson (sopranos), Mary Morris (contralto), David Brynely and Norman Notley (tenors) and Kelly himself. The group toured in the United States, appearing at New York's Town Hall. Both tenors were replaced by 1936, the new tenors being Eric Greene and Peter Pears who joined the group in time for its tour that year in the United States and Canada.
