= Martin Mobberley =

British amateur astronomer

Martin P. Mobberley (born 1958) is a British amateur astronomer, author, and former electronics engineer.

He takes images of many astronomical objects, including comets, planets, novae, supernovae and asteroids from his observatory in Suffolk, England. He has written eight major astronomy books for Springer: Astronomical Equipment for Amateurs (1998); The New Amateur Astronomer (2004); Lunar and Planetary Webcam User's Guide (2006); Supernovae and How to Observe Them (2007); Total Solar Eclipses and How to Observe Them (2007); Cataclysmic Cosmic Events and How to Observe Them (2008); The Caldwell Objects and How to Observe Them (2009); Hunting and Imaging Comets (2010). Mobberley has written three children's 'Space' books: Space Navigator; Space Sticker book; Space: Answers to Questions About Voyage and Discovery. These small books were published by Top That! Publishing. Mobberley's ninth Springer book, entitled It Came from Outer Space, Wearing an RAF Blazer, a biography of Sir Patrick Moore, was published in 2013 and a follow-up book entitled Return to the Far Side of Planet Moore was published in 2015.

Mobberley joined the British Astronomical Association (BAA) in 1969, aged 11, and has held various posts in the organisation since the early 1980s, culminating in his presidency from 1997 to 1999. He also gave his first public lecture, on the subject of the imminent Apollo 11 Moon landing at age 11. He has written over 100 articles in various BAA publications as well as dozens more in the association's journal, The Astronomer magazine, Astronomy Now, Sky & Telescope, and the BBC The Sky at Night magazine. In 1997 the International Astronomical Union (IAU) named asteroid 7239 as "Mobberley" in recognition of his services to astronomy. He was awarded the BAA's Goodacre Medal in 2000.

Mobberley has helped confirm a number of important astronomical discoveries since the 1980s, including the outburst of black hole candidate X-ray nova V404 Cygni in 1989 and several of Mark Armstrong's UK supernova discoveries. He is well known for his humorous and politically incorrect astronomy talks, which number well over 200. On 18 December 2003 he discovered a nova in the Andromeda Galaxy (Messier 31).

Mobberley filmed a three-hour interview with the prolific astronomical discoverer George Alcock in 1991, the only complete video interview ever granted by Alcock. Together with the late Ken Goward, Mobberley carried out detailed research into the astronomical life and telescopes of the stage and screen comedian Will Hay, who famously discovered a white spot on Saturn in 1933. Mobberley and Goward's research on this subject was published in the April 2009 Journal of the British Astronomical Association as a paper entitled Will Hay (1888 - 1949) and his telescopes.

He appeared on the BBC TV programme The Sky at Night ten times (thrice as sole guest) and his photographs and images appeared on the programme since 1982. He has also spoken on BBC Radio 4 and BBC Four about his hobby.

He graduated from Brunel University with an honours degree in electronic engineering in 1980. He worked for 22 years in industry (mainly as a software engineer) before becoming a full-time astronomy author in 2002.
