= Steuart Wilson =

English tenor and arts administrator (1889–1966)

James Steuart Wilson
- Steuart Wilson in 1951
- Born: 21 July 1889; Bristol, England
- Died: 18 December 1966 (aged 77); Petersfield, Hampshire
- Education: Winchester College, Hampshire
- Alma mater: King's College, Cambridge
- Occupation: Singer
- Spouse(s): Ann Bowles (div. 1931); Mary Wilson
- Father: James Wilson
- Relatives: Mona Wilson (half-sister); Arnold Talbot Wilson (brother)
- Military career
- Allegiance: United Kingdom
- Branch: British Army
- Service years: 1914–1916
- Unit: King's Royal Rifle Corps
- Conflicts: World War I; Ypres 1914; Somme 1916

Sir James Steuart Wilson (21 July 1889 – 18 December 1966) was an English singer, known for tenor roles in oratorios and concerts in the first half of the 20th century. After the Second World War he was an administrator for several organisations including the Arts Council of Great Britain, the BBC and the Royal Opera House.

Following service in the First World War, Wilson became known for singing tenor roles in oratorios by composers from Bach to Elgar, and was particularly admired both as the Evangelist in Bach's St Matthew Passion and in the title role of Elgar's The Dream of Gerontius. He was a champion of music by English composers of his generation, notably Ralph Vaughan Williams, Gustav Holst and Rutland Boughton. He also appeared from time to time in operatic tenor roles, including Satyavan in the first professional performance of Holst's Savitri. The quality of his voice and his technique were not universally admired. In a high-profile libel case Wilson sued a member of the public who had criticised one of his performances in a letter, and the BBC for publishing it: he won £2,000 in damages.

In 1937 Wilson settled for a while in the United States, teaching at the Curtis Institute of Music. He retired from singing and returned to the United Kingdom in 1942 where he began a second career as an administrator. He initially worked for the BBC, then after the war was appointed music director of the newly created Arts Council of Great Britain; in 1948 he was knighted for his services in that post. That same year he became the BBC's director of music, and engineered the enforced retirement of the BBC Symphony Orchestra's chief conductor, Sir Adrian Boult. The following year he became deputy general administrator of the Royal Opera House, in which post he secured the premiere staging of Vaughan Williams's The Pilgrim's Progress in 1951. Unhappy with being subordinate to the Royal Opera's general administrator, David Webster, Wilson resigned from his post in June 1955 and started a campaign against homosexuals in the musical profession. Wilson ended his career as principal of the Birmingham School of Music, 1957–1960.

== Life and career ==
=== Early years ===
Wilson was born in Bristol, the youngest child of James Wilson, headmaster of Clifton College who was once described as "something of a theological firebrand". He was named James after his father and Steuart in honour of his great-uncle Steuart Pears Steuart's elder half-sister was the leading civil servant Mona Wilson and his elder brother was Arnold Talbot Wilson, later the colonial administrator of Mesopotamia. His middle brother, Hugh Stanley Wilson, a master at Rugby School, was killed at Hebuterne in September 1915 in an action in which Charles Pawsey - of Kohima fame - gained his first MC. Wilson was educated at Winchester College and King's College, Cambridge, where he read classics but developed a strong interest in music. During that time he formed friendships with Clive Carey, Edward J. Dent and Ralph Vaughan Williams. Wilson's first public appearance as a singer was in Vaughan Williams's incidental music for Aristophanes' The Wasps in 1909, and he made his first appearance in opera as Tamino in Mozart's The Magic Flute in 1911.

At the outbreak of the First World War Wilson volunteered for service and was commissioned in the army. He served in the King's Royal Rifle Corps in France and was twice severely wounded – at Ypres in 1914 and on the Somme near High Wood in 1916; the first, in the lungs, seriously threatened his potential singing career but he worked hard to overcome the injury. He then worked in the Intelligence Bureau of the General Staff at the War Office and General Headquarters in France. Authorities differ on whether the wounds, which resulted in the loss of a lung and a kidney, affected his singing voice. The Oxford Dictionary of National Biography states that they did not; Frank Howes, writing in 1951, and The Times in its obituary, both state that they did. According to his biographer and third wife, Margaret Stewart, those who had heard Wilson sing before the war "agreed that his voice did not have quite the same carrying-power after the wound". Arthur Bliss, who had known Wilson at Cambridge, told Stewart that when the tenor "got tired he was sometimes inclined to sing a little flat, as he had never done before the war".

=== Singing career ===
After the war, Wilson developed an interest in early English music and was instrumental in founding the London-based sextet, the English Singers, in 1920. The following year he sang the role of Satyavan in the first professional performance of Gustav Holst's Savitri, at the Lyric Theatre, Hammersmith.

In 1921, Wilson met A. H. Fox Strangways, editor of the newly founded journal Music and Letters; they discovered a shared interest in making practical translations of Lieder texts, Wilson having only recently encountered Schubert Lieder, and collaborated on and published volumes of Schubert, Schumann and Brahms translated into English. Wilson later made an English translation of the texts set in Mahler's Das Lied von der Erde.

From 1921 to 1923, Wilson taught music at Bedales School, an appointment that left him time to take singing engagements all over the United Kingdom. In 1924 he left the English Singers and furthered his singing studies abroad, first in Nice with Jean de Reszke (1924–25), with whom he learned the roles of Otello, Parsifal and Tristan; he then took lessons with Sir George Henschel (1925–28), and studied 17th- and 18th-century music with Wanda Landowska in Paris.

For a while Wilson sang with the Bristol Opera Company, which toured in London to perform at the Royal Court Theatre in 1927 and 1928, conducted by Adrian Boult and Malcolm Sargent. Productions mounted included Ralph Vaughan Williams's The Shepherds of the Delectable Mountains, and Charles Villiers Stanford's The Travelling Companion.

Wilson became a leading interpreter of the Evangelist in JS Bach's Passions, and of the title part in Edward Elgar's The Dream of Gerontius, which he sang under the baton of the composer and other conductors including Hamilton Harty, Malcolm Sargent, Albert Coates, and Adrian Boult. The Times called him "the best exponent of [Gerontius] at the present time". The tenor Peter Pears said that it was hearing Wilson singing as Evangelist in Bach's St Matthew Passion that "started me off".

Mozart remained part of Wilson's repertoire at the Old Vic (though Howard Ferguson complained "Steuart Wilson would sing out of tune"), and he regularly championed English music, making regular appearances at Rutland Boughton's festival in Glastonbury and on occasion at Napier Miles's festivals in Bristol. He was praised by Holst, who credited him with rescuing the British National Opera Company production which had previously "ruined" his opera At the Boar's Head.

Writing in 1968, The Gramophone critic Roger Fiske recalled that Wilson "stood out above other tenors both for high intelligence and for clarity of words, though his voice was not by nature of especial beauty; also he never sang quite as well in performance as at rehearsal, his tone tightening under stress." Frank Howes made similar observations in an article published in 1951, though noting that "intelligence" was a recognised euphemism for "indifferent vocal equipment". A more recent judgement, based on recordings of Schubert Lieder, describes "Wilson's stentorian and rather stiff delivery—the fast vibrato, his tendency to rush (slower songs sound better) and the impression that he is distinctly overparted in the higher register", all of which "does not make for a satisfactory performance according to today's standards."

For many years, Adrian Boult had been a close friend of Wilson and his first wife Ann, née Bowles. When, in the late 1920s, Wilson began to mistreat his wife, Boult took her side. She divorced Wilson on grounds of cruelty in 1931, and married Boult two years later. (Note: Richard Aldous in his biography of Malcolm Sargent (p. 156) alleges that Boult and Ann Wilson were having an affair before her divorce from Wilson, but the source he cites – Kennedy, pp. 81, 111, 161–163 – does not corroborate his statement. Rather, Kennedy relates that Boult was intensely shy with women and that he only "felt 'safe'" with Ann because she was married. He also had a warm relationship with the Wilsons' children, being godfather to one, and known by all of them as "Uncle Adrian". It was at Boult's insistence, when Ann's divorce was in process, that she should "start a new life" and that he would "take them [Ann and the children] all on".) The enmity provoked in Wilson was to have lasting repercussions. The stigma attached to divorce in Britain in the 1930s affected Wilson's career: he was barred from performing in English cathedrals at the Three Choirs Festival for 25 years until 1957, when he narrated Honegger's King David in Worcester, by which time his singing career had ended. (Note: Boult's career in the meantime flourished, and in 1937 he was invited to conduct the orchestra at Westminster Abbey for the coronation of King George VI and Queen Elizabeth.)

=== Writing for Holst ===
Wilson provided the words for Gustav Holst's choral ballet The Morning of the Year, the first composition ever commissioned by the BBC. Holst conducted the world premier for the live broadcast on 17 March 1927 and, a few weeks later, the first performance with dancers.

=== BBC libel case ===
Wilson achieved a wider fame for his successful libel action against the BBC in what became known as "the case of the intrusive H". In 1933, the BBC had printed in the 14 April edition of its magazine The Radio Times a letter from a retired schoolmaster who, having heard a broadcast of the St Matthew Passion, accused Wilson of the technical fault of aspirating his runs in decorated music: "I am amazed that the BBC could engage anyone quite so incompetent in his breath control. ... 'Pilate's wife' became 'Pigh-highlet's wigh-highf'; 'High Priest' was turned into 'High-high Pree-heest'; 'Purple robe' into 'Purple ro-hobe'; 'to' into 'too-hoo', and so on throughout the entire performance. It was simply ghastly." When Wilson complained, the BBC initially offered to publish an apology in The Radio Times, but then took exception when Wilson demanded £5,000 in damages.

Wilson sued the BBC. The corporation vigorously defended its action on the grounds that the letter was justified criticism of a performer. Wilson questioned the letter writer's competence to pass judgement on his performance: while Wilson conceded that he used the "intrusive H", as a legitimate ornament which his teacher, Jean de Reszke, inserted into several works, and admitted that he had used it at two points in his broadcast performance, neither of these occurrences had been pointed out in the letter. Furthermore, two of the letter's cited examples, "Pilate's Wife" and "purple robe", did not appear in his part of the work at all. During the three-day court case several expert witnesses were called, including Clive Carey who brought as evidence a score annotated by de Reszke. The judge, Lord Hewart, urged the jury to be "extremely liberal": after 45 minutes deliberation, the jury decided against the BBC and the letter writer, and awarded Wilson £2,000 damages. The BBC chose not to appeal and shouldered the entire cost: in an internal memo the BBC Director General, John Reith, observed that in such cases a British jury would tend to favour the individual, rather than a corporation, and that to appeal might appear an unjustified use of the BBC's monetary power.

Wilson used the money he won in the libel case to support a London production of Boughton's opera The Lily Maid, which he himself conducted at the Winter Garden Theatre in January 1937. He was praised for his assured beat and experienced direction.

=== United States ===
In 1937 Wilson settled for a time in the United States with his second wife, Mary (who was a cellist), and joined the faculty at the Curtis Institute of Music in Philadelphia; there he taught singing, English diction, vocal repertoire, and vocal ensemble. He continued to give recitals into the early 1940s. In 1941 he resigned from the Curtis Institute in protest against the dismissal of the director Randall Thompson, and the following year the Wilsons returned to England. This was the end of Wilson's career as a singer, he himself observing, "The whole place [America] is jammed full of singers from every country in the world, all rampaging around for jobs."

=== Musical administrator ===
Wilson joined the BBC in 1942 "in a minor capacity with hopes of preferment". The following year he was appointed music director for the BBC Overseas Service. After the war he was appointed music director of the Arts Council of Great Britain, newly formed from the wartime Council for the Encouragement of Music and the Arts (CEMA), and he helped reorganise the music department for peacetime work. In that post, he gave support to Benjamin Britten's English Opera Group in the first year of its existence, recommending to the Council that the group should "be awarded a grant of not less than £3000 and closer to £5000". He subsequently accepted an invitation to give a lecture at the first Aldeburgh Festival, speaking on 10 June 1948 on "The Future of Music in England".

In April 1948, the year in which he was knighted for his services as director of the Arts Council, he became the BBC's director of music following the sudden death of Victor Hely-Hutchinson. The Times described this appointment as "not a success", and it is chiefly remembered for the controversy Wilson provoked by engineering the forced retirement of Boult as chief conductor of the BBC Symphony Orchestra. In the 1930s Boult had been promised informally by the Corporation's then director-general, John Reith, that he would be exempt from the BBC's rule that staff retire at age 60. However, Reith left the BBC in 1938 and his promise carried no weight with his successors. Wilson, on being appointed director of music, made clear to the BBC's director-general, William Haley, that he intended to have Boult replaced as chief conductor of the BBC Symphony Orchestra, and used his authority to insist on Boult's enforced retirement. (Note: In her biography of Wilson, English Singer, Wilson's third wife Margaret disputes this and claims that "Steuart was not personally involved" in the decision, and that it was others at the BBC who were pressing for Boult's removal.) Haley was unaware of Wilson's personal animus against Boult and later acknowledged, in a broadcast tribute to Boult, that he "had listened to ill-judged advice in retiring him."

In 1949 Wilson, aged 60, moved to Covent Garden to take the post of deputy general administrator of the Royal Opera House. While in that position he gave support to the Polish composer Andrzej Panufnik, who had recently defected from communist Poland, by introducing him to the concert agent Harold Holt. Wilson was responsible for securing the premiere of Vaughan Williams's The Pilgrim's Progress at the Royal Opera House in 1951. Wilson resented being subordinate to the general administrator, David Webster, and he resigned from his Royal Opera House post in June 1955. The following month it was announced that he was launching "a campaign against homosexuality in British music" and was quoted as saying: "The influence of perverts in the world of music has grown beyond all measure. If it is not curbed soon, Covent Garden and other precious musical heritages could suffer irreparable harm."

Wilson's last major appointment was as principal of the Birmingham School of Music, 1957–1960, but this is described by Grove as "an unhappy episode". The Gramophone critic Roger Fiske commented that Wilson "'administered' with an aggressive sensitivity and wit that veered between the inspired and the impossible".

Wilson died in 1966 in Petersfield, Hampshire, aged 77.

== Recordings ==
On a recording made in 1927 during a performance at the Royal Albert Hall, London, Wilson sings in extracts from The Dream of Gerontius conducted by the composer. He also recorded Vaughan Williams's On Wenlock Edge, and songs by Denis Browne.

== Notes and references ==
=== Sources ===
- Aldous, Richard (2001). Tunes of Glory: the Life of Malcolm Sargent. London: Hutchinson. ISBN 0091801311.
- Banfield, Stephen (1988). Sensibility and English Song: Critical Studies of the Early Twentieth Century. Cambridge: Cambridge University Press. ISBN 052137944X.
- BBC Year Book 1949: "Radio Personalities of 1948: Music" (PDF). London: BBC. 1949. pp. 81–82.
- Cobbe, Hugh, ed. (2010). Letters of Ralph Vaughan Williams, 1895–1958. Oxford: Oxford University Press. ISBN 978-0199587643.
- Haltrecht, Montague (1975). The Quiet Showman: Sir David Webster and the Royal Opera House. London: Collins. ISBN 0002111632.
- Holst, Imogen (1974). A Thematic Catalogue of Gustav Holst's Music. London: Faber Music. ISBN 0-571-10004-X.
- Hurd, Michael (1993). Rutland Boughton and the Glastonbury Festivals. Oxford: Oxford University Press. ISBN 0198163169.
- Hurd, Michael, ed. (2001). Letters of Gerald Finzi and Howard Ferguson. Woodbridge: Boydell Press. ISBN 0851158234.
- Jacobson, Bernard (1996). A Polish Renaissance. London: Phaidon. ISBN 0714832510.
- Kennedy, Michael (1989). Adrian Boult. London: Macmillan. ISBN 0333487524.
- Mitchell, Donald; Reed, Philip; Cooke, Mervyn, eds. (2004). Letters from a Life: Selected Letters of Benjamin Britten, Vol 3, 1946–1951. London: Faber and Faber. ISBN 057122282X.
- Pears, Peter (1995). Travel Diaries 1936–1978. Woodbridge: Boydell Press. ISBN 9780851157412.
- Short, Michael (1990). Gustav Holst: The Man and his Music. Oxford: Oxford University Press. ISBN 019314154X.
- Stewart, Margaret (1970). English Singer: The Life of Steuart Wilson. London: Gerald Duckworth & Co. ISBN 07156-0468-6.
- Tunbridge, Laura (Summer 2013). "Singing Translations: The Politics of Listening Between the Wars" (PDF). Representations. 123 (1). University of California Press: 53–86. doi:10.1525/rep.2013.123.1.53. JSTOR 10.1525/rep.2013.123.1.53.
