= Clive Carey =

English singer, composer, opera producer and folk song collector

- Carey in 1928
- Born: 1883; Sible Hedingham, Essex, England
- Died: 1968 (aged 84); London, England
- Resting place: Holy Trinity, Church Road, Claygate, Surrey, KT10 0JP
- Education: Sherborne School; Clare College, Cambridge; Royal College of Music

Francis Clive Savill Carey CBE (30 May 1883 – 30 April 1968), known as Clive Carey, was an English baritone, singing teacher, composer, opera producer and folk song collector.

== Biography ==
Clive Carey was born at Sible Hedingham, Essex, in 1883. He was a chorister in the Choir of King's College, Cambridge, and then attended Sherborne School before becoming an Organ Scholar at Clare College in 1901. He then entered the Royal College of Music (RCM) under the auspices of the Grove Scholarship in Composition, studying under Sir Charles Villiers Stanford (composition) and James H. Ley (singing). He had further study with Jean de Reszke in Paris and Nice.

He made his London debut in a song recital in 1907, making an immediate impression. The Times commented that he had "a baritone voice of wide compass and attractive quality, which he produces in very easy manner and with an assurance that is by no means common in a young singer. His songs lay well off the beaten track ... the singer showed himself thoroughly at home in them all." On 1 and 2 December 1911 he played Papageno in Mozart's The Magic Flute at Cambridge, in a performance he himself produced, in which the English translation by Edward J. Dent was used for the first time. He then sang in a considerable number of other operas.

In 1911 Carey started collecting English folk songs in Sussex with Dorothy Marshall, and later in Oxfordshire and Gloucestershire. World War I interrupted most of Carey's musical activities; he was a ward orderly in the Medical Corps in France, among other duties, although he did publish Ten English Folk Songs in 1915. Also in 1915, he began setting The Starlight Express, but Sir Edward Elgar was given the commission. After the war, he took part in Rutland Boughton's performances at Glastonbury. For the Old Vic Theatre, where he was based from 1920 to 1924, he produced and sang in The Marriage of Figaro and The Magic Flute (1920), and Don Giovanni (1921). He also toured at home and in Europe in the vocal sextet called The English Singers.

Clive Carey became a teacher of singing at the RCM. His pupils there over a number of decades until his death in 1968 included: Edith Coates, Rita Hunter, Arnold Matters, Elsie Morison, Margaret Nisbett, John Noble, Alberto Remedios, Betty Roe, Eric Shilling, Joan Sutherland, Ava June and David Ward. See: List of music students by teacher: C to F#Clive Carey.

In 1924 he was appointed Director of Singing at the Elder Conservatorium at the University of Adelaide in South Australia, and also appeared there in straight acting roles with a repertory company. He also collected Australian folk songs while he was there. He contributed an article on English folk songs to an Australian Theosophist magazine. He sang in some of Dame Nellie Melba's farewell concerts in 1927. He toured India and the United States on his return journey in 1927–28, singing MacHeath in The Beggar's Opera, and also appearing with a troupe of morris dancers. He then returned to the RCM, where he lectured and gave English folk song recitals. He married Doris Mabel Johnston, daughter of Samuel Johnson of Adelaide, in 1929. From 1932 he confined himself mainly to teaching and operatic production, but he also sang occasionally at Sadler's Wells, and in 1936 he appeared at Covent Garden as Master of the Chorus in Oedipus Rex. He was a member of the Sadler's Wells Management Committee after the death of Lilian Baylis in 1937.

In 1939, at the outbreak of World War II, Carey happened to again be in Australia with his wife, and they remained there for the duration of the war; he taught in Melbourne and gave song recitals. In 1945, back in London, he was appointed Director of Opera at Sadler's Wells.

In the New Year's Honours of 1955, he was appointed a Commander of the Order of the British Empire (CBE).

Clive Carey was active in restoring the original intentions of the composers who interested him, by removing accumulated traditions in the performances of certain of their operas. This gave the performances he was involved in a freshness and vitality that had often been long lost.

His compositions included a number of songs and incidental music. His incidental music to The Blue Lagoon and The Wonderful Visit were both heard in London. His song Rondel was sung by Elsie Suddaby at the 1930 Proms, and Melmillo was performed at the 1932 Proms by Steuart Wilson. Other songs include The Spring, Love on my Heart from Heaven fell, Alma Mater, The Liverpool Girls, I have loved Flowers that fade, In the Highlands, Villanelle, Triolet, Jenny kiss'd me, April Children and Three Songs of Faery.

Clive Carey had personal associations and correspondences with E. M. Forster, Rupert Brooke, Edward J. Dent, M. R. James, William Denis Browne, Ernest Farrar, Percy Lubbock and other notable people. There is a large collection of his papers and letters in the Vaughan Williams Memorial Library. An "informal biography" of Edward Dent, Duet for Two Voices compiled by Clive Carey's nephew Hugh Carey, was published in 1979 based on the 400 or so letters exchanged by Dent and Carey.

He died in London on 30 April 1968, aged 84. He and his wife, who also died in 1968, are buried at the Holy Trinity Parish Church, Claygate, Surrey. His obituary appeared in Vol. I, No. 4 of the Folk Music Journal, 1968.
