= William Barton Worthington =

British civil engineer (1854–1939)

- Born: 8 July 1854; Lancaster, Lancashire
- Died: 29 December 1939 (aged 85)
- Education: Owens College, Manchester
- Engineering career
- Discipline: Civil
- Institutions: Institution of Civil Engineers (president),

William Barton Worthington (8 July 1854 – 29 December 1939) was a British civil engineer.

William Worthington was born in Lancaster to Samuel Barton Worthington, a railway engineer. He was educated at Owens College, Manchester, and then at the University of London. Following this he was apprenticed to his father. Upon completion of his apprenticeship he joined Blyth & Cunningham of Edinburgh working on projects for the Caledonian Railway.

In 1876 he became the resident engineer for the London and North Western Railway, working on the construction of Manchester Exchange Station. During this time he worked under the supervision of the Chief Engineer, William Baker. In 1890 he was appointed assistant engineer to the Lancashire and Yorkshire Railway, becoming their chief engineer in 1897. He became chief engineer at Midland Railway in 1905, remaining there until his retirement in 1915.

He then set up practice as a consultant engineer and served as president of the Institution of Civil Engineers between 1921 and 1922.

Professional and academic associations
Preceded by John Alexander Brodie	President of the Institution of Civil Engineers; November 1921 – November 1922	Succeeded by William Maw
