= George Mitchell Seabroke =

English astronomer

George Mitchell Seabroke FRAS (1 April 1848 – 1 April 1918) was an English amateur astronomer. By profession he was a solicitor.

He took an interest in astronomy while a pupil at Rugby School. Together with the school's Mathematics and Science Master, James Wilson (later Canon of Worcester), he observed double stars at the Temple Observatory. He remained at the observatory, carrying out observations and promoting the study of astronomy to the schoolboys of Rugby School. The Observatory boasted an 8¼ inch (210mm) aperture refracting telescope built by Alvan Clark of America.

He was one of the founders of the British Astronomical Association, and served as its Double Star Section Director from 1892 to 1915, its Saturn Section Director from 1899 to 1911, and its national president from 1900 to 1902. He also served as Midland Branch President from 1902 to 1903.

== Publications ==
Seabroke published his astronomical observations in several journals.

Seabroke, G M, On the Determination whether the Corona is a Solar or Terrestrial Phenomenon, Monthly Notices of the Royal Astronomical Society 30 (1870), p.193

Seabroke, G M, On the Displacement of the Bright Lines in the Spectrum of the Solar Chromosphere, Monthly Notices of the Royal Astronomical Society 30 (1870), p.197

Seabroke, G M, The Aurora Borealis of Feb. 4th, Nature 5 (1872), p.283

Seabroke, G M, (with Wilson, J M), Remarks on Spectroscopic Observations of the Sun, made at the Temple Observatory, Rugby School, in 1871-2-3, Monthly Notices of the Royal Astronomical Society 34 (1873), p.26

Seabroke, G M, (with Wilson, J M), Note on Coggia's comet, Monthly Notices of the Royal Astronomical Society 35 (1874), p.83

Seabroke, G M, (with Wilson, J M), Catalogue of Micrometrical Measurements of Double Stars, made at the Temple Observatory, Memoirs of the Royal Astronomical Society 42 (1875), p.61

Seabroke, G M, (with Wilson, J M), Second Catalogue of Micrometrical Measures of Double Stars, made at the Temple Observatory, Memoirs of the Royal Astronomical Society 43 (1877), p.105

Seabroke, G M, (with Wilson, J M), Note on the second catalogue of micrometrical measurements of double stars made at the Temple Observatory, Rugby, Monthly Notices of the Royal Astronomical Society 38 (1877), p.29

Seabroke, G M, Spectroscopic observations of the motion of stars in the line of sight, made at the Temple Observatory, Rugby, Monthly Notices of the Royal Astronomical Society 39 (1879), p.450

Seabroke, G M, Third Catalogue of Micrometrical Measures of Double Stars made at the Temple Observatory, Rugby, Memoirs of the Royal Astronomical Society 46 (1881), p.183

Seabroke, G M, Comet b 1881, Nature 24 (1881), p.431

Seabroke, G M, The Comet, Nature 26 (1882), p.621

Seabroke, G M, The Recent Magnetic Storm and Aurora, Nature 26 (1882), p.571

Seabroke, G M, The Comet, Nature 27 (1882), p.5

Seabroke, G M, The Comet, Nature 27 (1882), p.52

Seabroke, G M, Fourth Catalogue of Micrometrical Measures of Double Stars, made at the Temple Observatory, Rugby, Memoirs of the Royal Astronomical Society 48 (1885), p.195

Seabroke, G M, The New Star in Andromeda, Nature 32 (1885), p.523

Seabroke, G M, Spectroscopic observations of the motion of stars in the line of sight, made at the Temple Observatory, Rugby, Monthly Notices of the Royal Astronomical Society 47 (1887), p.93

Seabroke, G M, Spectroscopic Observations of the Motions of Stars in the Line of Sight, made at the Temple Observatory, Rugby, Monthly Notices of the Royal Astronomical Society 50 (1889), p.72

Seabroke, G M, (with Smith A P, & Highton, H P), Fifth Catalogue of Micrometrical Measures of Double Stars, made at the Temple Observatory, Rugby, Memoirs of the Royal Astronomical Society 50 (1892), p.1

Seabroke, G M, Aurora, Nature 45 (1892), p.605

Seabroke, G M, Lecture: On the Measurement of Double Stars, Journal of the British Astronomical Association 3 (1892), p.79-83

Seabroke, G M, Lecture: On a Method of Graphically Constructing the Apparent Orbit of a Binary Star, Journal of the British Astronomical Association 4 (1894), p.147-149

Seabroke, G M, (with Highton, H P), Further Measures of Double Stars made at the Temple Observatory, Rugby during the Years 1890-1895, Memoirs of the Royal Astronomical Society 51 (1895), p.267

Seabroke, G M, A Mechanical Method of Correcting Transits for the Principal Instrumental Errors, Journal of the British Astronomical Association 7 (1897), p.267-272

Seabroke, G M, (with Highton, H P, Atkinson, E C, & Lempfert, R G K), Further Measures of Double Stars made at the Temple Observatory, Rugby, during the Years 1895 to 1901, Memoirs of the Royal Astronomical Society 54 (1904), p.97

Seabroke, G M, Further Measures of Double Stars made at the Temple Observatory, Rugby School, during the years 1901 to 1909, Memoirs of the Royal Astronomical Society 59 (1910), p.291

== Obituaries ==
- MNRAS 79 (1919) 231
- Obs 41 (1918) 226
- JBAA 28 (1918) 185
