= Jacqueline Mitton =

British astronomer (born 1948)

- Born: Jacqueline Pardoe; 1948 (age 77–78); England
- Education: Somerville College, Oxford and Murray Edwards College, Cambridge
- Spouse: Simon Mitton
- Scientific career
- Fields: astronomy

Jacqueline Mitton (née Pardoe, born 1948) is a British astronomer, writer, and media consultant who lives and works in Cambridge, UK. She studied at Somerville College, Oxford and Murray Edwards College, Cambridge. She has also served as Public Relations Officer for the Royal Astronomical Society. From 1987 to 1993, she was the editor of the Journal of the British Astronomical Association and has authored, co-authored, or contributed to many books.

Mitton's career has focused on bringing astronomy to the public - both adults and children - as a writer. She received a Bachelor of Arts at Oxford University in 1969 and a PhD at Cambridge University in 1975. Her 1998 picture book Zoo in the Sky introduces children to astronomy through an explanation of the stars and animal constellations. Her 2003 book Once Upon a Starry Night introduces children to myths and facts about the Solar System.

She was a county councillor for Cambridgeshire from 1989 to 1993.

Asteroid 4027 Mitton is named after her and her husband Simon Mitton.

== Books ==
(not a complete list)

- Astronomy: an introduction (1978)
- Key definitions in astronomy (1980)
- Discovering Astronomy (1983), with Simon Mitton
- A Visitor's Introduction to the Antarctic and its Environment (1984), with Nigel Bonner
- Invitation to Astronomy (1986), with Simon Mitton
- Gems of Hubble (1996), with Stephen P. Maran
- Discovering the Planets (1991)
- The Young Oxford book of Astronomy (1994), with Simon Mitton
- The Great Comet Crash: The Collision of Comet Shoemaker-Levy 9 and Jupiter (1995), co-edited with John Spencer
- Galileo: scientist and star gazer (1997)
- Aliens (1998)
- The Marshall children's guide to astronomy (1998), with Simon Mitton
- Zoo in the Sky: a book of animal constellations (1998)
- Kingdom of the sun: a book of the planets (2001)
- "Working with the media: the Royal Astronomical Society experience", in Organizations and Strategies in Astronomy II (2001), ed. André Heck
- Stars and planets (2002)
- Once Upon a Starry Night: Heroes and Gods of the Constellations (2003), republished as The Planet Gods
- Oxford Astronomy (2003), with Simon Mitton
- Zodiac: celestial circle of the sun (2004)
- Cambridge illustrated dictionary of astronomy (2007)
- Moon (2009)
- I see the moon (2010)
- Titan Unveiled: Saturn's Mysterious Moon Unveiled (2010), with Ralph Lorenz
- Space (2016)
- From dust to life : the origin and evolution of our solar system (2017), with John Chambers
- The Penguin Dictionary of Astronomy (various editions)
