= Alexander Boksenberg =

British physicist (1936–2026)

Alexander "Alec" Boksenberg CBE FRS (18 March 1936 – 11 November 2026) was a British scientist who was the Director of the Royal Greenwich Observatory from 1981–1995. In the early 1980s he developed the image photon counting system, an electronic detector for faint astronomical sources. His astronomical research focused on active galactic nuclei.

Boksenberg was appointed a Commander of the Order of the British Empire (CBE) in the 1996 Birthday Honours for services to Astronomy. He won the 1998 Jackson-Gwilt Medal from the Royal Astronomical Society and the 1999 Hughes Medal from the Royal Society. The minor planet 3205 Boksenberg is named after him.

He won the Richard Glazebrook Medal and Prize in 2000.

Boksenberg died on 11 November 2026, aged 90.
