= British Astronomical Association =

Association of amateur astronomers

- Abbreviation: BAA
- Formation: 1890
- Legal status: Non-profit company
- Purpose: Amateur astronomy
- Location(s): Tonbridge, Kent, TN9; United Kingdom
- Region served: UK and Worldwide
- Members: Amateur astronomers
- President: Janice McClean
- Main organ: BAA Council
- Website: britastro.org

The British Astronomical Association (BAA) was formed in 1890 as a national body to support the UK's amateur astronomers.

Throughout its history, the BAA has encouraged observers to make scientifically valuable observations, often in collaboration with professional colleagues. Among the BAA's first presidents was Walter Maunder, discoverer of the seventeenth century dearth in sunspots now known as the Maunder Minimum which he achieved by analysing historical observations. Later, this spirit of observing the night sky scientifically was championed by George Alcock, who discovered five comets and five novae using nothing more than a pair of binoculars.

The BAA continues to contribute to the science of astronomy, even despite modern competition from space-based telescopes and highly automated professional observatories. Modern digital sensors, coupled with techniques such as lucky imaging, mean that even modest amateur equipment can rival what professional observatories could have achieved a few decades ago. The vastness of the night sky, together with the sheer number of amateur observatories, mean that BAA members are often the first to pick up new phenomena. In recent years, the Association's leading supernova hunter, Tom Boles (President 2003–5), has discovered over 150 supernovae. He now holds the world record for the greatest number of such events discovered by any individual in history.

More recently the BAA has worked increasingly with international partners. Modern communications allow astronomers in different time zones around the world to hand over the monitoring of variable stars and planetary weather systems to colleagues on other continents as the Sun comes up, resulting in a 24-hour watch on the sky. For example, the Association's Variable Star Section works closely with the American Association of Variable Star Observers, meanwhile its Jupiter Section works with a global network of planetary observers through the JUPOS collaboration.

== Publications ==
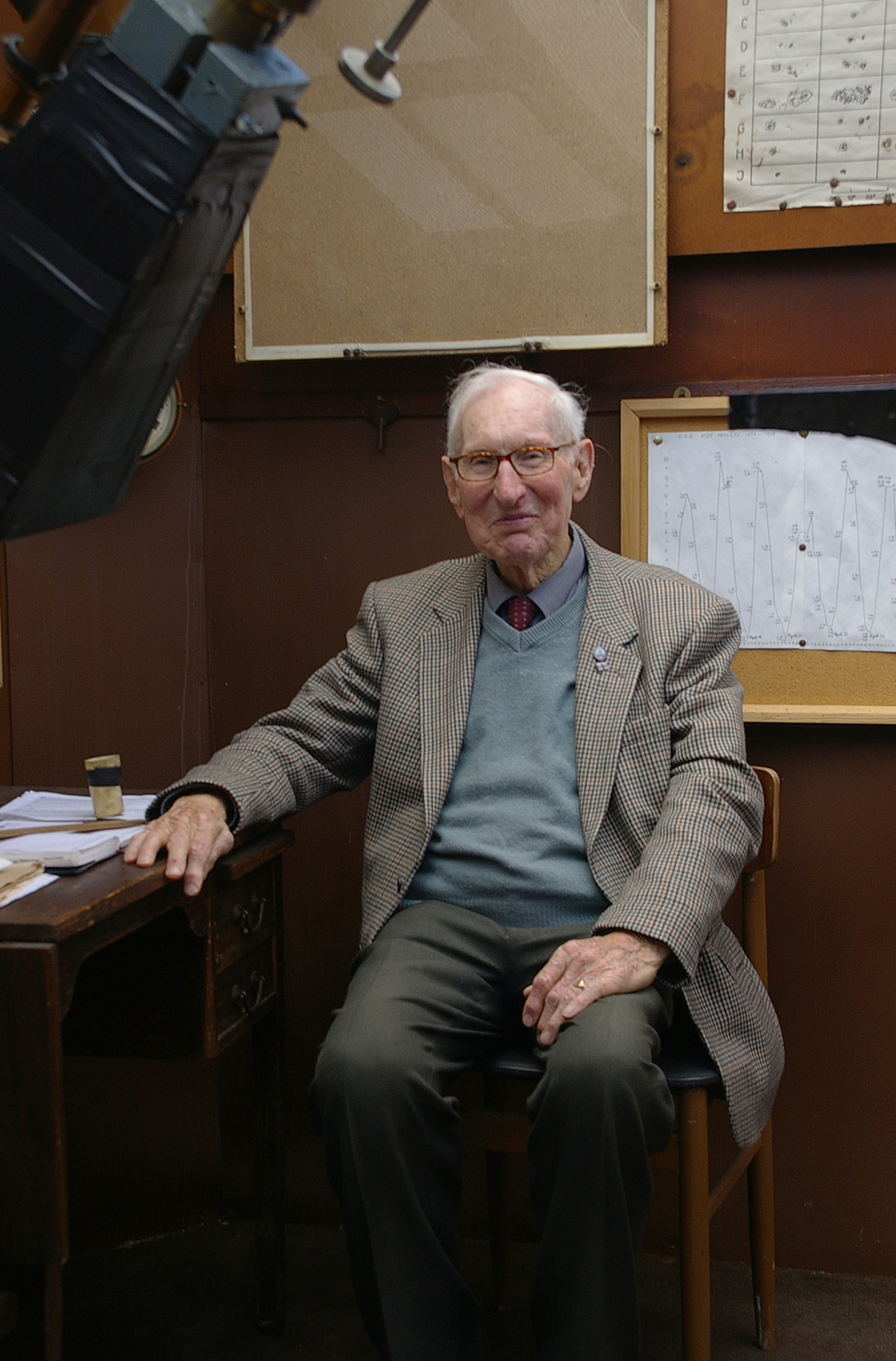
Norman Rogers (1922–2012), a member of the BAA, in his solar observatory.

The Association's longest standing publication is its journal, published six times a year and sent to all members. Once a year, the Association also publishes a handbook which comprises an almanac for the following year. Electronic bulletins are issued to give more immediate notice by email of discoveries, astronomical news and BAA meetings.

== Structure ==
The Association operates a wide range of observing Sections which specialise in particular branches of astronomy, welcoming observers and astronomy enthusiasts of all abilities in a spirit of collaboration and mutual help.

It also founded and supports the Campaign for Dark Skies, a UK-wide campaign against excessive light pollution.

In 2022, after seventy-nine years of leasing office space from the Royal Astronomical Society, in Burlington House, Piccadilly, London the association moved out.

== History ==
In October 1890, the BAA was formed to support amateur astronomers in the UK. In many ways it is a counterpart to the Royal Astronomical Society - which primarily supports professional observers - and the two organisations have long shared the same premises. The idea for this organisation was first publicly proposed by Irish astronomer William H. S. Monck in a letter published in The English Mechanic on 12 July.

Playing a significant role in the founding of the Association was English astronomer E. Walter Maunder, with the help of his brother Frid Maunder and William H. Maw. The first meeting of the Association was held on 24 October 1890, with 60 of the initial 283 members in attendance. Initially it was decided to run the association with a provisional 48-member Council that included four women: Margaret Huggins, Elizabeth Brown, Agnes Clerke and Agnes Giberne.

The society formed several observing Sections for specialised topics in astronomy. Elizabeth Brown, possibly the only woman in England at the time to own her own observatory, became Director of the Solar Section. The Association was presented with or bequeathed various astronomical instruments, but lacked the funds to build their own observatory. A total of 477 instruments were acquired during the first 117 years since the Association was founded.

== Eclipse expeditions ==
In addition to members making independent arrangements there have been several more or less officially organised expeditions to observe several total solar eclipses in various parts of the World. These include:-

- 1896 to Vadsø, Norway for the eclipse of 9 August.
- 1898 to India for the eclipse of 22 January.
- 1900 to the United States, Portugal, Spain, Algeria and at sea (aboard the R.M.S. Austral) for the eclipse of 28 May.
- 1905 to Burgos (Spain), Labrador (Canada) and at sea (aboard the ss Arcadia) for the eclipse of 30 August.
- 1914 for eclipse of 21 August.
- 1922 to Stanthorpe (Queensland) by members of the New South Wales Branch for the eclipse of 21 September.
- 1936 to the Mediterranean for the eclipse of 19 June.
- 1973 aboard the cruise ship Monte Umbe 30 June.
- 1999 to Truro, Cornwall for the eclipse of 11 August.

== Branches ==
The Association held monthly meetings in London, but also established branches to cater for members who could not attend London activities and desired to meet in their own areas.

The first of these was the Northwestern Branch which served members in the Northwest of England, centred on Manchester. The Branch was formed in 1892, in 1903 it seceded from the BAA to form the Manchester Astronomical Society.

- North Western Branch Presidents
  - Samuel O’Kell 1892–1895
  - Prof. Thomas Hamilton Core 1895–1903

In 1891, a group of amateurs in Australia began discussing the idea of setting up branches of the BAA in their own country. What would become the New South Wales Branch was established in 1895 and would be the only one to survive for more than a brief period. This branch became the second oldest astronomy organisation in Australia and is still in existence. It is an affiliate organisation now called Sydney City Skywatchers to better reflect its location and membership.

- New South Wales Branch Presidents
  - John Tebbutt 1894–1896
  - George Handley Knibbs 1896–1898
  - Rev. Thomas Roseby 1898–1900
  - Walter Frederick Gale 1900–1902
  - William John MacDonnell 1902–1904
  - George Denton Hirst 1904–1906
  - Charles J. Merfield 1906–1907
  - Hugh Wright 1907–1909
  - James Nangle 1909–1911
  - Rev. Thomas Roseby 1911–1914
  - Walter Frederick Gale 1914–1923
  - Rev. Edward F. Pigot 1923–1925
  - J. J. Richardson 1925–1927
  - Walter Frederick Gale 1927–1929
  - James Nangle 1929–1930
  - Walter Frederick Gale 1930–1932 and 1932–1933
  - Rev. William O'Leary 1933–1934 and 1934–1935
  - Walter Frederick Gale 1935–1936
  - Alan Patrick Mackerras 1936–1937
  - Walter Frederick Gale 1937–1938 and 1938–1939
  - Henry Herbert Baker 1939–1940
  - Harley Weston Wood 1940–1942
  - Walter Frederick Gale 1942–1943
  - Alan Patrick Mackerras 1943–1945
  - Horace Edgar Frank Pinnock 1945–1946
  - Alan Patrick Mackerras 1946–1947
  - W. H. Robertson 1947–1950
  - D. Coleman-Trainor 1950–1951
  - Alan Patrick Mackerras 1951–1954
  - Harley Weston Wood 1954–1956
  - Rev. Thomas Noël Burke-Gaffney 1956–1958
  - W. Kemp Robertson 1958–1960
  - F. J. Bannister 1960–1962
  - Alan Patrick Mackerras 1962–1964
  - W. H. Robertson 1964–1966
  - Noel James Halsey Bissaker 1966–1968
  - W. Swanston 1968–1971
  - W. E. Moser 1971–1974
  - K. Sims 1974–1976
  - R. Giller 1976–1978
  - T. L. Morgan 1978–1979
  - F. N. Traynor 1979–1981
  - S. J. Elwin 1981–1982
  - F. N. Traynor 1982–1984
  - J. Jackson 1984–1986
  - Colin Bembrick 1986–1988
  - D. Alan Yates 1988–1990
  - George Smith 1990–1994
  - Monty Leventhal 1995–1996
  - Ralph Buttigieg 1996–1998
  - Michael Chapman 1998–2000
  - Dr. Wayne Orchiston 2000–2001
  - Elizabeth Budek 2001–2003
  - Michael Chapman 2003–2016
  - Monty Leventhal OAM 2016–2019
  - Dr Toner Stevenson 2019–2021
  - Ann Cairns 2021–present

A West of Scotland Branch was established by an inaugural meeting held on 23 November 1894, to be based in Glasgow. In 1905 authority was granted to enrol members from the whole of Scotland, but it was not until 1937 that the name was changed to "Scottish Branch". In 1954 the Branch seceded from the BAA to form the Astronomical Society of Glasgow.

- West of Scotland Branch Presidents
  - Walter C. Bergius 1895–1897
  - John Danskin 1897–1899
  - Rev. Edward Bruce Kirk 1899–1901
  - John Danskin 1901–1903
  - Robert Robertson 1903–1905
  - James Waddell 1905–1907
  - Major John Cassells 1907–1909
  - Archibald Campbell 1909–1911
  - Dr. Alexander D. Ross 1911–1913
  - Archibald A. Young 1913–1915
  - John Johnston Ross 1915–1917
  - Frank C. Thomson 1917–1919
  - Henry McEwan 1919–1921
  - John O. Ross 1921–1923
  - John D. McDougall 1923–1925
  - Charles Cochrane 1925–1927
  - Charles Clelland 1927–1929
  - Thomas L. MacDonald 1929–1931
  - David Buchanan Duncanson 1931–1933
  - William B. Inverarity 1933–1935
  - George Douglas Buchanan 1935–1937
  - Prof. William Marshall Smart 1937–1938
- Scottish Branch Presidents
  - Prof. William Marshall Smart 1938–1939
  - Prof. William Michael Herbert Greaves 1939–1941
  - Charles T. McIvin 1941–1943
  - Prof. William Marshall Smart 1943–1945
  - Rev. J. Graham 1945–1947
  - W. H. Marshall 1947–1949
  - C. Walmsley 1951–1953
  - Dr. T. R. Tannahill 1953–1954

In 1896 an East of Scotland Branch was formed. This Branch was dissolved due to lack of support on 3 October 1902.

- East of Scotland Branch Presidents
  - William Peck 1896–1898
  - William Firth 1898–1900
  - John Turner 1900–1902

In 1897 a second Australian Branch was formed by 13 members living in Victoria. At the London AGM of 1907 the President noted that "the Victoria Branch appears to be in a moribund condition".

- Victoria Branch Presidents
  - Robert Ellery 1897–1900
  - Rev. John Meiklejohn 1900–1901
  - Ernest Frederick John Love 1901–1904
  - Prof. William Charles Kernot 1904–1905
  - Robert James Allman Barnard 1905

The Victoria Branch was re-established in 1951 (as 'The Victorian Branch'), but only lasted until 1963.

- Victorian Branch Presidents
  - Philip Crosbie Morrison 1951–1952
  - George Anderson 1953–1957
  - H. B. Lewis 1958–1959
  - Dr. G. F. Walker 1959–1960
  - C. S. Middleton 1960–1961
  - George Anderson 1961–1962

In 1901 at a meeting of the Birmingham Natural History and Philosophical Society it was proposed to form a Midland Branch of the BAA. Support proved to be less than had been envisioned and there are no reports of any activity after 1903.

- Midland Branch Presidents
  - Sir Oliver Lodge 1901–1902
  - G. M. Seabroke 1902–1903

What would become the BAA Western Australia Branch started as the Western Australian Astronomical Society in 1912. When difficulties were encountered in the mid nineteen-twenties Prof. Ross highlighted the advantages of restarting within the BAA. The inaugural meeting was held on 29 March 1927. However support was still lacking and there is no recorded activity after September 1929.

- Western Australia Branch President
  - Prof. Alexander David Ross 1927

== Presidents ==
- 1890–1892, William Noble
- 1892–1894, Arthur Matthew Weld Downing
- 1894–1896, Edward Walter Maunder
- 1896–1898, Nathaniel Everett Green
- 1898–1900, William Maw
- 1900–1902, George Mitchell Seabroke
- 1902–1904, Samuel Arthur Saunder
- 1904–1906, Andrew Claude de la Cherois Crommelin
- 1906–1908, Frederick William Levander
- 1908–1910, Henry Park Hollis
- 1910–1912, Edward Knobel
- 1912–1914, Ernest Elliott Markwick
- 1914–1916, Theodore Evelyn Rees Phillips
- 1916–1918, Frank Watson Dyson
- 1918–1920, Harold Thomson
- 1920–1922, Patrick Henry Hepburn
- 1922–1924, Walter Goodacre
- 1924–1926, Charles Douglas Percy Davies
- 1926–1928, William Herbert Steavenson
- 1928–1930, Maurice Anderson Ainslie
- 1930–1932, Arthur Everard Levin
- 1932–1934, William Alfred Parr
- 1934–1936, Harold Spencer Jones
- 1936–1938, Rev. Martin Davidson
- 1938–1940, Bertrand Meigh Peek
- 1940–1942, Francis John Sellers
- 1942–1944, Frederick James Hargreaves
- 1944–1946, Philibert Jacques Melotte
- 1946–1948, Frank Maurice Holborn
- 1948–1950, John Guy Porter
- 1950–1952, Gerald Merton
- 1952–1954, Edward Howard Collinson
- 1954–1956, Reginald L. Waterfield
- 1956–1958, Alan Hunter
- 1958–1960, Henry C. King
- 1960–1962, Robert d'Escourt Atkinson
- 1962–1964, Ernest Agar Beet
- 1964–1966, Donald Archibald Campbell
- 1966–1968, William Edward Fox
- 1968–1970, Gordon E. Taylor
- 1970–1972, Vinicio Barocas
- 1972–1974, Neville James Goodman
- 1974–1976, Howard G. Miles
- 1976–1978, Harold B. Ridley
- 1978–1980, James Leslie White
- 1980–1982, H. Derek Howse
- 1982–1984, Patrick Moore
- 1984–1986, Heather Couper
- 1986–1987, Storm Dunlop
- 1987–1989, Henry Hatfield
- 1989–1991, Colin A. Ronan
- 1991–1993, John Mason
- 1993–1995, Richard McKim
- 1995–1997, Maurice Gavin
- 1997–1999, Martin Mobberley
- 1999–2001, Nick Hewitt
- 2001–2003, Guy Hurst
- 2003–2005, Tom Boles
- 2005–2007, Richard Miles
- 2007–2009, Roger Pickard
- 2009–2011, David Boyd
- 2011–2013, Bill Leatherbarrow
- 2013–2015, Hazel McGee
- 2015–2017, Jeremy Shears
- 2017-2019, Callum Potter
- 2019-2021, Alan Lorrain
- 2021-2024, David Arditti
- 2024-date, Janice McClean

== See also ==
- List of astronomical societies
