= Francis Graham-Smith =

British astronomer (1923–2025)

Sir Francis Graham Smith FRS
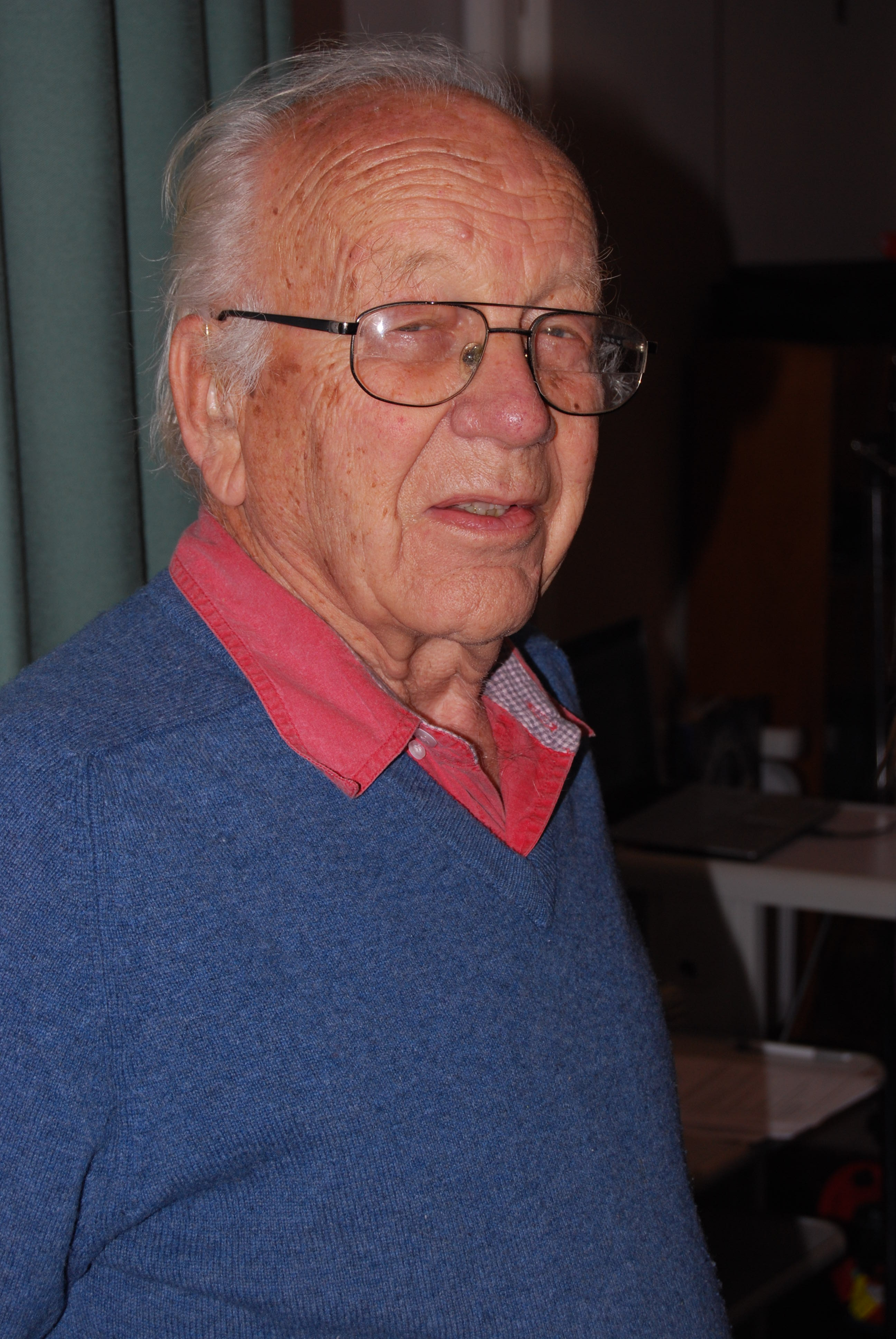
- Smith in 2009
- Born: 25 April 1923; London
- Died: 20 June 2025 (aged 102)
- Education: Rossall School; University of Cambridge
- Spouse: Elizabeth Graham Smith (died 2021)
- Awards: Royal Medal (1970); Richard Glazebrook Medal and Prize (1991)
- Scientific career
- Fields: Radio astronomy
- Workplaces: University of Manchester; Director of the Royal Greenwich Observatory
- Doctoral students: Andrew Lyne

13th Astronomer Royal
- In office 1982–1990
- Preceded by: Martin Ryle
- Succeeded by: Arnold Wolfendale

Sir Francis Graham-Smith FRS (25 April 1923 – 20 June 2025) was a British astronomer. He was the 13th Astronomer Royal from 1982 to 1990 and was knighted in 1986.

== Early life and education ==
Francis Graham Smith (he hyphenated his middle name and surname later) was born in London on 25 April 1923, son of civil servant Claud Henry Smith, of Fairlight, East Sussex, and Cicely Winifred, née Kingston. He was educated at Epsom College and Rossall School, and Downing College, Cambridge from 1941.

== Career and research ==
In the late 1940s, Graham-Smith worked at the University of Cambridge on the Long Michelson Interferometer.

In 1964, he was appointed Professor of Radio Astronomy the University of Manchester and in 1981 director of the Nuffield Radio Astronomy Laboratories, part of the University of Manchester at Jodrell Bank. He was also Director of the Royal Greenwich Observatory from 1975 to 1981.

He appeared in Episode 13 of Series 4 of Treasure Hunt when the show visited Jodrell Bank, giving presenter Anneka Rice a piggyback to allow her to reach a clue. His doctoral students included Andrew Lyne. His published work includes

- (with J.H. Thompson): Optics (J. Wiley, 1971)
- (with Bernard Lovell): Pathways to the Universe (Cambridge, 1989)
- (with Andrew Lyne): Pulsar Astronomy (Cambridge, 1990)
- (with Bernard F. Burke and Peter N. Wilkinson): An Introduction to Radio Astronomy (Cambridge, 1997)
- Unseen Cosmos (Oxford, 2013)
- Eyes on the Sky: A Spectrum of Telescopes (Oxford, 2016)

== Personal life and death ==
Graham-Smith was an avid bee-keeper and kept up this hobby well into his 90s, looking after the hives at Jodrell Bank. He also inspired the creation of the St Andrews Amateur Beekeeping Society.

He lived with his wife Elizabeth in the Old School House in Henbury, Cheshire, from 1981 until her death in 2021. They had met when they were both working with Martin Ryle in 1945–6 in Cambridge in the early days of radio astronomy. They had three sons and a daughter.

Graham-Smith was a Patron of Humanists UK, was the President of Macclesfield Astronomical Society, and was a patron of Mansfield and Sutton Astronomical Society.

Graham-Smith celebrated his 100th birthday on 25 April 2023, and died on 20 June 2025, at the age of 102.

== Awards and honours ==
Graham-Smith's awards and honours include:

- elected a Fellow of the Royal Society in 1970 and was awarded their Royal Medal in 1987
- served as president of the Royal Astronomical Society from 1975 to 1977
- served as the thirteenth Astronomer Royal from 1982 to 1990
- Awarded the Richard Glazebrook Medal and Prize in 1991

In 1965, he was invited to co-deliver the Royal Institution Christmas Lecture on Exploration of the Universe.
