= Federation of Astronomical Societies =

The Federation of Astronomical Societies (FAS) is an international union of astronomical societies formed in 1974 and celebrated its 50th anniversary in 2024. Its motto is "Supporting UK Astronomy", and there is also one member society from Spain. As of November 2021, it has over 200 member societies.

FAS publishes a newsletter 6 times a year, which is sent to its member societies, and holds in-person conventions as well as events online. The FAS is run by a council of elected volunteers.

A major benefit for local societies is to be able to arrange Public Liability Insurance from a policy which is shared between the members, greatly reducing the policy fee.

== Conventions ==
The FAS on-line convention in April 2021 was addressed by Lord Martin_Rees, the UK Astronomer Royal. Another speaker was George Tahu, the Lead Program executive for Mars_2020, speaking from Washington, D.C.

The Autumn 2021 Convention was the first national in-person astronomy event in the UK since 2019, due to COVID. It took place at the National Space Centre in Leicester on Saturday 13 November.

The 2022 convention was on 12 November in Oxford. The theme was "Women In Astronomy" — the keynote speaker was Dame Jocelyn Bell-Burnell.

The 2025 convention will be held in May in Cambridge at the Institute of Astronomy.

== See also ==
- List of astronomical societies
