= William Henry Stanley Monck =

Irish astronomer and philosopher (1839–1915)

William Henry Stanley Monck (21 April 1839–24 June 1915) was an Irish astronomer and philosopher. After an early education at Kilkenny College, Monck attended Trinity College Dublin. In 1878, he was appointed as Professor of Moral Philosophy and remained in that position until 1892. On 28 August 1892, he became the first person to measure starlight electrically. For many years Monck served as Chief Registrar for the Bankruptcy Division of the High Court of Ireland. He wrote several works about logic, metaphysics, and astronomy, and was the author of a collection of articles in Popular Astronomy. He was also a founding member of the British Astronomical Association, on whose body he served.

== Early life and family ==
William Henry Stanley Monck was born on 21 April 1839, in Skeirke, County Laois. Tutors helped him in his father's house growing up. He then moved to Dublin and was educated in Trinity College Dublin, where he garnered several accolades, such as first in the University Science Examination in 1861. He was married to Kate Winifred Stanley Monck, daughter of Tobias Peyton of County Roscommon. He lived on Earlsfort Terrace in Dublin with his servants Christina Hynes and Agnes Dixon, who were Roman Catholics. Monck and his wife Kate were Church Of Ireland Protestants. He was part of a long line of Anglo-Irish. They had no children.

The Monck family was originally descended from the Le Moyne family in Devonshire and were prominent Anglo-Irish Protestants. He was apparently descended from Lord Monck, the Duke of Albemarle, who although a Parliamentarian during the English Civil Wars, was instrumental in the placing of Charles II as King of England in 1660. Monck was the grandnephew of Charles Monck, the first Lord Monck. He was the third son of the Reverend Thomas Stanley Monck, Rector of Innistogue, County Kilkenny.

== Career ==
Monck started his career as a professor of moral philosophy in Trinity where he wrote "An Introduction to Kant's Philosophy" and "Introduction to Logic". Monck was the author of numerous works on logic and metaphysics, including "Space and Vision".

In 1875 he was called to the bar, and then became Chief Registrar in the Bankruptcy Division of the High Court of Ireland; he held this post for many years.

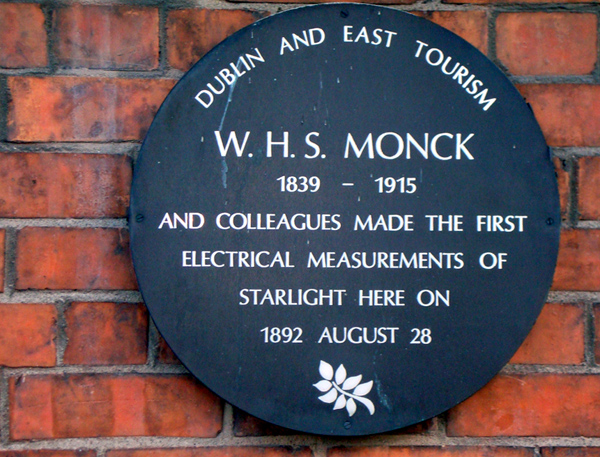

In 1892, Monck, George F. Fitzgerald, and his neighbour S.M. Dixon created the first electrical measurements of starlight using photovoltaic cells which were made by George M. Minchin. These measurements were taken from a telescope in his back garden. A plaque to honour the location of the first electric measurements of starlight was unveiled at 16 Earlsfort Terrace on 6 April 1987.

Monck was well known for his original writing on astronomical subjects. Many of his letters were contributed to The Observatory magazine. These letters mainly dealt with the maintenance of the sun's heat, historical eclipses, and chronology generally. He also wrote for The English Mechanic and other papers. One of Monck's greatest thoughts in his career as an astronomer was the idea that there were two distinct classes of yellow stars, one dull and near and the other bright and remote; this idea was later taken up by J. Gore of Sligo.

He drew a lot of attention to the relationship between the proper motions of stars and their spectral types, and later dealt with it again in Astronomy and Astrophysics, vols xi. and xii. He returned once more to the subject, and from discussion of the Dunsink catalogue of 717 stars made a demonstration that the earlier types of stars are endowed with a smaller proper motion than later.

Monck was elected a corresponding member of the Astronomical and Physical Society of Toronto on 4 October 1898.

== Later life ==
Monck retired from Trinity College Dublin in 1882. In July 1890 he wrote a letter to The English Mechanic, in which he advocated the formation of an association of amateur astronomers for those excluded from the socially elite Royal Astronomical Society, which also refused membership to women. This letter contributed to the foundation of the British Astronomical Association in October 1890 and Monck was a member of its first council.

Near the end of Monck's life he became less social and kept more to himself. He never lost his interest in the field of academics. He spent most of his time in his home in Sligo studying from books on philosophy and astrology. It was said that he enjoyed playing chess.

He died on 24 June 1915. His widow died a few months later on 15 October. They are buried at St. Michael's, Clonoe, County Tyrone. Their tombstone is inscribed with the words "peace perfect peace".

== Legacy ==
Monck's achievements have been honoured by Trinity College Dublin through the opening of the WHS Monck Observatory on top of the Fitzgerald building. It was officially opened on 12 December 2008; however, it had been operational since October 2007. The observatory has a 10' Fiberglass dome and an isolation platform to negate the effects of shock waves caused by people's footsteps on the telescope found inside it.

Minchin reported Monck's aperture, incorrectly, when measuring the planets and stars to be 9 inches. These false figures have been used by several authors.

John P. Mahaffy has described Monck's "An Introduction to Critical Philosophy" as the "shortest and possibly most complete" account of the philosopher Immanuel Kant.
