= Glenda Raymond =

Australian soprano

Glenda Raymond (26 October 1922 – 2003) was an Australian soprano with a long career on radio and on stage in Melbourne, closely associated with conductor Hector Crawford, whom she later married.

== History ==
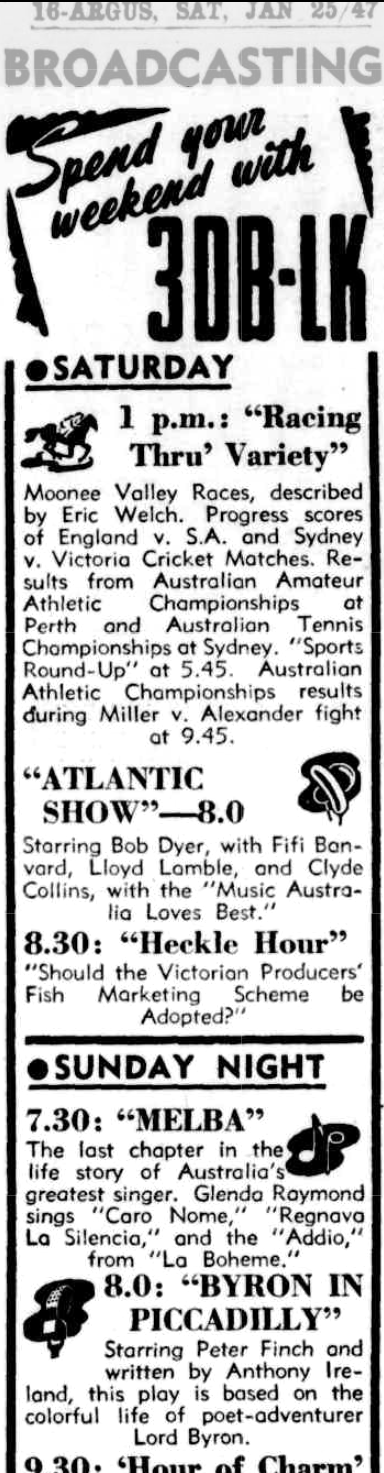
Advertisement 25 Jan 1947

Raymond was born into a musical family (see below), the only daughter of soprano Veta Coraline Ryan, née Furlong, and Cleveland Vivian Ryan, who divorced in 1929. She was brought up by her grandmother Annie Furlong, née Wemyss, in the Melbourne seaside suburb of Sandringham.

After leaving school the diminutive Raymond (then named Glenda Ryan) was employed as a bank clerk (shorthand typist?) in Prahran, Melbourne. In 1944 she made the shortlist for a Melbourne University Conservatorium entrance exhibition. Another in the list was violinist Leonard Dommett. By May 1944 she was using "Raymond", as a stage name at least.

There are several different stories of how she got her start in radio: in one account she failed an audition for a radio talent quest, and was so indignant she confronted Hector Crawford, who recognised her talent. Another, from Raymond herself, had her in a recording studio, making a personal recording as a gift for some family member, and was overheard by Crawford, who invited her to appear in his "Music for the People" concerts, for which he was conductor. One such concert was held at the Coburg Town Hall in July 1944. In any event, Crawford recommended her to a teacher, Pauline Bindley, her coach for the next five years.

Her singing career began in 1946, when she was chosen to portray the singing voice of the early adult Nellie Melba in the radio serial Melba, broadcast on Melbourne's radio stations 3DB and 3LK, and on-sold to broadcasters throughout Australia. No expense was spared in making this 50-episode series — Raymond sang every note in Melba's repertoire with a full symphony orchestra in the original key. Her portrayal was praised by Mrs George Armstrong, Melba's daughter-in-law.

Her reputation grew with a series of radio concerts Opera for the People, (Note: Opera for the People was a series of English-language adaptations of well-known operas, using the best musicians available and popular actors as narrators, designed for maximum appeal, with tuneful arias interspersed with narration emphasising dramatic situations. Hector Crawford was again conductor along with tenor John Lanigan and baritone Maxwell Cohen. The show received unstinting praise from critics.) appearing in its premiere, La Bohème in 1946, followed by many others. Raymond became a celebrity.

In 1948, accompanied by bass-baritone David Allen and piano accompanist Eunice Garland, (Note: In real life Eunice Bradley, married to violinist Reginald Bradley; Desmond Bradley, violinist, was a son.) she embarked on a fundraising tour to take her to Italy for further training. The Vacuum Oil Company (Mobil) was a sponsor, though to what extent was not mentioned in their advertising. She left for London by the Orion in August 1948.

Her expressed intention was to study in Milan, but no record of her travelling to Italy, or having contact with Lina Pagliughi has been found. One of her first contacts in London was to the teacher Dino Borgioli, at Queen's Gate in London. She next had an interview with Basil Cameron, and an audition at Wigmore Hall, after which she was contracted to sing the role of "Etain" in Rutland Boughton's The Immortal Hour with the London Philharmonic Orchestra at the "Great Hall" of the People's Palace on 4 April.

Her "Etain" received good notices in The Times, and she found regular work with the BBC, including a television appearance, also with the London Philharmonic Orchestra, including a concert at the Royal Albert Hall. She studied under Borgioli, as did Sun Aria winner John Lanigan. She returned to Sydney via Darwin on a BOAC Constellation. on 2 August 1949, and thence to Melbourne. Some of her supporters were disappointed at her early return, and without having studied in Milan. Perhaps they felt chagrin at her travelling by air — hugely expensive in the 1940s, unbecoming for a struggling artist.

She made her first return concert at the Alfred Hall, Ballarat, on 3 September 1949, with Premier Hollway and his wife in the audience, followed by a guest appearance at the Mobil Quest final, at which the winner was the baritone Ronal Jackson, and Joan Sutherland one of the semi-finalists. Jackson was guest vocalist at Raymond's concert at the Melbourne Town Hall on 11 October. One critic suggested she had spent her time overseas, not in studying, but merely singing.

On 17 February she sang at a benefit in the Melbourne Town Hall for the young violinist Desmond Bradley, accompanied by Eunice Garland, in real life his mother. On 22 February she took part in a recreation, or rather celebration, of Melba's farewell concert at the Royal Albert Hall on 25 June 1926. Other sopranos to take part were Barbara Wilson and Joan Arnold. Raymond's numbers included Home, Sweet Home. She flew to Sydney five days later and left for London by BCPA on 1 March. She appeared in the second revival of Boughton's The Immortal Hour, conducted by the composer rather than the previously advertised Sir Adrian Boult. Of the four principals of bass, baritone, tenor and soprano, three were Australians — Arnold Matters, Douglas Parnell, and Glenda Raymond. The theatre was only one third filled, due to inadequate publicity She returned to the Royal Albert Hall and Wigmore Hall, winning praise from The Times critic, and shared a stage with Sydney baritone John Cameron. She returned to Melbourne by air in July 1950. Later that year Dorothy Crawford produced a variety program Glenda, with Hector Crawford and orchestra and a variety of guests, which went to air on 3DB, 8:00 pm on Mondays, 18 September 1950 to 10 September 1951. John Amadio was a regular guest. Meanwhile she was also appearing in Music for the People concerts at the Botanical Gardens.

=== Marriage and after ===
In 1949 it was revealed that Raymond and an RAAF serviceman had been engaged to marry, though no further details or confirmation has been found. She announced her imminent return to London, but accepted Crawford's proposal of marriage. They married in a very private ceremony on 10 November 1950 in Melbourne. The guests included Raymond's father, premier John Cain and his daughter Joan Cain. A subsequent celebration was less secretive."Celebrated with Cocktails". The Argus (Melbourne). No. 32, 518. Victoria, Australia. 21 November 1950. p. 9 – via National Library of Australia.

Raymond's later work for the Australian Broadcasting Commission was praised by the critic from the Sydney Morning Herald as just as attractive a singer, but more thoughtful than her earlier self.

The first of the "Music for the People" concerts to be held at the Sidney Myer Music Bowl took place on 19 February 1961, and Raymond was frequently a contributor.

== Family ==
Horatio John Furlong (1870 – 4 July 1926) married Annie Wemyss (1876–1960) in 1896 and lived in Ballarat East. She later lived in Sandringham, Victoria. Their family included:

- Myrtle Janet Furlong ( – ) was a piano teacher, ALCM gold medal recipient, married George Hyde in 1928.
- Doris Furlong ( – ) was a pianist, competed in South Street and A.N.A. competitions 1910–1915. She married James Iles of Kyabram in 1926. Her sister Veta sang at the wedding.

- Valerie Iles

- Veta Coraline Furlong ( – ) was an operatic soprano prominent 1918–1926. She won a Parker Scholarship in 1918, married Cleveland Vivian Ryan in 1921, divorced in 1929. She was later known as Fay Williams, living in Tasmania.

- Glenda Ryan (c. 1923 – ), changed her name to Glenda Raymond in the 1940s, married Hector Crawford on 10 November 1950.

- (Hazel) Norma Furlong married William Sibbald Steven in 1927, lived in Kyabram.
- Harry Hume Furlong (14 January 1906 – 1967) was a bass singer and footballer. He married Marjorie and had a home at Sandringham.

They were parishioners of St Thomas' (Anglican) Church, Moonee Ponds.

== Recordings ==
ABC Records released an LP compilation of works by Raymond: ABC CLASSICS Australian Heritage Series 472 689 2 [73.46]

Composer	Opera	Song	with
Gioachino Rossini	Il barbiere di Siviglia	1: Una voce poco fa 2: Dunque io son	Geoffrey Chard, bar.
Jacques Offenbach	Les contes d'Hoffmann	3: Les oiseaux dans la charmille 4: Belle nuit, ô nuit d'amour 5: Elle a fui, la tourterelle	John Lanigan, ten. (all exc. tr. 5)
Giacomo Puccini	La bohème	6: O soave fanciulla	John Lanigan, ten.
Ambroise Thomas	Hamlet; Mignon	7: Pâle et blonde 8: Je suis Tatania	
Giuseppe Verdi	Rigoletto	9: Tutte le Feste	
Charles Gounod	Faust	10: Alerte! Ou vous êtes perdus!	John Lanigan, ten., David Allen, bar.
	Mireille	11: Valse ariette: O légère hirondelle	
	Roméo et Juliette	12: Où suis-je?	John Lanigan, ten.
Gaetano Donizetti	La fille du régiment	13: Ah bruit de la guerre	David Allen, bar.
Wolfgang Amadeus Mozart	Così fan tutte	14: Ah guarda, sorella	Sylvia McPherson, mezzo
Heinrich Proch		15: Deh! torna mio bene	
Friedrich von Flotow	Martha	16: Letzte Rose	John Lanigan, ten.
Ruggero Leoncavallo	Pagliacci	17: Hui! Stridono lassú	
Robert Burns		18: Comin thro' the rye	
Francesco Tosti		19: Goodbye	

Australian Symphony Orchestra/Hector Crawford

The varied and interesting programme on this disc includes arias and duets etc sung in English and the original language. The Hoffmann 'Barcarolle' (tr. 4) sung, unusually with a tenor as the muse Nicklause, the Hamlet (tr. 7) and Mireille's aria (tr. 12) - all come from the earliest, 1946, sessions of the 'Melba Story'. They show a very light flexible and agile voice, rather lacking in colour or variety of tone. She sings both Olympia’s and Antonia's arias from Hoffmann (trs. 3 and 5), and this lack of weight and colour is a serious drawback for the latter whilst her sketchy trill and sliding between notes is a weakness in the former, although the high note at 4:35 is secure. The smudged roulades and runs in the Hamlet aria quickly improved after Raymond's lessons, particularly with Lina Pagliughi in Italy and Dino Borgioli in London. The upshot is a rather mixed bag in conveying Raymond's particular skills as a light-toned lyric coloratura soprano. John Lanigan, an Australian tenor who made a considerable career at Covent Garden, particularly in 'character' roles, is an agreeable partner vocally as is Geoffrey Chard, another name that will be recognised in the UK. Less successful is David Allen, a characterless baritone Mephisto in the final trio from Faust (tr. 9). Overall the recording quality is bright and clear with the voices well forward. The presence of an audience is sometimes indicated by applause at the conclusion of a track.
