= Hector Crawford =

Australian radio and television producer (1913–1991)

Hector Crawford AO CBE
- Hector Crawford c.1950s
- Born: Hector William Crawford; 14 August 1913; Fitzroy, Victoria, Australia
- Died: 11 March 1991 (aged 77); Australia
- Occupations: Radio and TV producer, conductor and director
- Years active: 1940−1989
- Known for: Broadcast Exchange of Australia, Crawford Productions
- Spouse(s): Enda Marie Stock (m. 1942; div. 1947) Glenda Raymond (m. 1950)
- Children: 2

Hector William Crawford AO, CBE (14 August 1913 – 11 March 1991) was an Australian entrepreneur, conductor and media mogul, best known for his radio and television production firms. He and his sister Dorothy Crawford founded Crawford Productions, which was responsible for many iconic programs and initiated the careers of a number of notable Australian actors and entertainers. His influence on the Australian entertainment industry was immense and enduring, and one obituary described him as "one of the best-known and most respected names in the history of Australian entertainment".

== Biography ==
Crawford was born in Fitzroy in 1913. His parents were William Henry Crawford, a commercial traveller, and Charlotte (née Turner), a contralto and organist. He studied at the Melbourne Conservatorium of Music and later conducted the orchestra there. In 1940 he became the musical and recording director of Broadcast Exchange of Australia, a radio broadcasting house, and its managing director in 1942.

In 1945 he and his sister Dorothy Crawford founded Crawford Productions. Hector managed music, administration and sales, while Dorothy attended to script-editing and casting.

== Radio productions ==
Radio programs produced included Opera for the People, Melba, often referred to as The Melba Story (starring Patricia Kennedy and then-unknown Glenda Raymond), The Amazing Oscar Hammerstein, and The Blue Danube.

There were also radio dramas such as No Holiday for Halliday, Sincerely Rita Marsden, My Imprisoned Heart, A Woman in Love, Inspector West, and Lone Star Lannigan.

Most (if not all) of Crawford's radio programs were produced for 3DB (Melbourne), at which station his brother, Curteis Crawford, was an administrator and, later, manager. Through 3DB these programs were distributed to stations throughout Australia, particularly members of the Major Broadcasting Network of which 3DB was the founder.

=== Mobil Quest ===
The singing competition Mobil Quest (1949–1957) first brought coloratura sopranos Joan Sutherland and June Bronhill and tenor Donald Smith to public notice. The competition heats were broadcast on radio.

== Television ==
Crawfords became the first independent producer to screen a programme on Australian television. Wedding Day was a games/quiz show, in which newly married couples came into the studio straight from their wedding reception, in the hope of winning prizes. It premiered on HSV-7 on 10 November 1956 (his own 6th wedding anniversary) and ran for 39 weeks.

Australia's first hour-long television drama series, Consider Your Verdict premiered in 1961, and the hugely successful police drama Homicide in 1964, which lasted till 1977. Then came Showcase (1965–69; a major talent quest that discovered a large number of big names; Crawford also conducted the Showcase Orchestra), Hunter (1967–69), The Box (1974–77), The Sullivans (1976–82), the miniseries All the Rivers Run (1983), as well as Division 4, Matlock Police, Cop Shop, Skyways, The Flying Doctors and Carson's Law, among other programs. At one point, all of the country's then three commercial television networks were showing Crawford studio dramas.

In the 1970s he was involved in the Make It Australian campaign to encourage more locally produced television content. The Whitlam government appointed Crawford a member of the Australian Film and Television School in 1973, and a member of the Australian Film Commission in 1974.

== Music for the People ==
As well as his endeavours in the drama field, Crawford was also interested in music and particularly orchestra conducting, though sometimes disparaged in this role. In 1938 he produced the first Music for the People concert. These concerts were presented a number of times during each summer season on Sunday afternoons, firstly in the Fitzroy Gardens and from 1959 in the Sidney Myer Music Bowl. 3DB broadcast all Music for the People concerts from 1940. In latter years, the concerts were televised over HSV-7.

The concerts were performed by the Australian Symphony Orchestra, especially formed by Crawford for the purpose, and supplemented by a wide range of mainly well-known artistes.

Originally, the concerts were composed of light classical music but, over the years, the format became lighter and lighter and even some pop music was later performed. An example of the latter occurred on 12 March 1967 when The Seekers performed at Music for the People; their performance being simulcast on 3DB and HSV 7. The Seekers concert was performed in front of the largest crowd ever for a concert event in Australia with an estimated 200,000 people attending. The 2007 Guinness Book of World Records lists it as the greatest attendance at a concert in the Southern Hemisphere in history. This attendance is also included in The Australian Book of Records.

Hector Crawford conducted the orchestra for Colleen Hewett in Music for the People c.1975.

Recordings of Music for the People radio broadcasts from 1946-early 1950s are held in Australia's National Film and Sound Archive.

== Personal life ==
Crawford married twice: in December 1942, he married violinist Edna Marie Stock; they divorced in 1947 on the grounds of desertion. He married again, on 10 November 1950, to coloratura soprano Glenda Raymond. They had two children.

Crawford sold his controlling interests in Crawford Productions in 1987 and retired in 1989. He died in 1991, aged 77.

== Honours ==
=== Official honours ===
Crawford was appointed an Officer of the Order of the British Empire (OBE) in the New Year's Honours of 1968, "in recognition of service as Director of Music for the People". In the Queen's Birthday Honours of 1980, he was raised to Commander of the order (CBE), "in recognition of service to the arts".

In the Queen's Birthday Honours of 1986, he was made an Officer of the Order of Australia (AO), "for service to Australian television production".

=== Industry and other honours ===
Crawford was awarded special Logie Awards in 1969, 1971, 1975 and 1976, for outstanding contribution to Australian television and show business. In 1984, he was the first inductee into the Logie Hall of Fame.

Other awards included the Footlighter's Award, the Colin Bednall Award, the Chips Rafferty Memorial Award, the Sir Charles McGrath Award of the Australian Marketing Institute, an Advance Australia Award, the Hartnett Medal of the Royal Society of Arts, the Sir Arthur Cowan Award, the inaugural BHP Australian Television Festival Award for Excellence, and Life Membership of the Screen Production Association of Australia (SPAA).

== Legacy ==
The Hector Crawford Memorial Lecture is given at the annual Screen Producers Australia Conference, now called Screen Forever. "The lecture has been a keynote feature of the annual conference since 1992. It honours its namesake's legacy and emphasises the importance of independent production in Australia's cultural life". It is the major annual public statement on the screen production and broadcasting industries in Australia.

The Hector Crawford Award has been awarded by the Australian Writers' Guild as part of the AWGIE Awards since 1991, for Outstanding Contribution to the Craft as a Script Producer, Editor or Dramaturg.
