= Royal South Street Eisteddfod =

Not to be confused with the historical Ballarat Welsh Eisteddfods.

The Royal South Street Eisteddfod, also known as The Grand National Eisteddfod of Australasia, is held annually in Ballarat, Australia and is administered by the Royal South Street Society. It began as a debating competition run by the South Street Society in 1891 and attained "Royal" status in 1962. It soon grew and now includes public speaking, acting, singing, music, dance and calisthenics. It is the oldest and longest running Eisteddfod in Australia.

The Aria section, "competition for The Sun trophy, representing a prize of 23 guineas for an aria from Grand Opera, to be sung in English", was sponsored by The Sun News-Pictorial, a Melbourne newspaper, from 1924, and continued independently as the Melbourne Sun Aria.

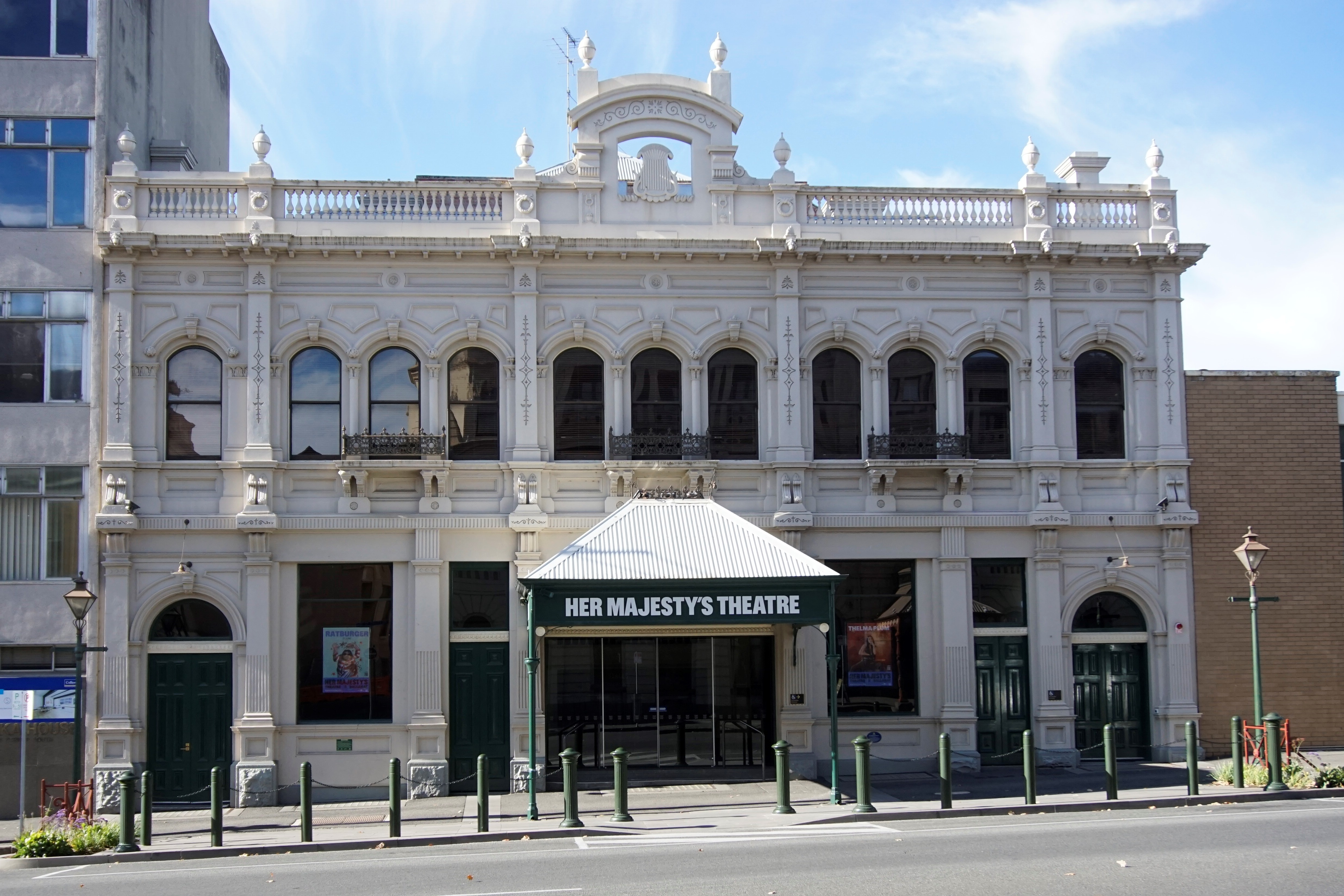
"Her Maj", Ballarat, in 2025

Since 1965 it has been held in Her Majesty's Theatre, Ballarat, Australia's oldest continually operating theatre. Situated on Lydiard Street, it was designed by George Browne and opened in 1875 as the Academy of Music and given the current name in 1898. It was purchased in 1965 after the South Street Society ran an appeal to save it from demolition, and from 1966 to 1988 was known as the South Street Memorial Theatre. Today Her Majesty's is the main venue for the Eisteddfod, but it was gifted to the City of Ballarat in 1987 to enable government funding for major upgrades, restorations and maintenance work.

Virtual competitions only were held from 2020 due to COIVID-19 precautions, but were scheduled to resume in 2022.

== Competitors ==
Notable competitors past eisteddfods include:

- James Scullin
- Alfred Deakin
- Mary Grant Bruce
- Amy Castles
- Joan Kirner
- Denise Drysdale
- David Atkins
- Kiri Te Kanawa

== See also ==
- Melbourne Sun Aria contest
- Shell Aria contest
