= Dennis Olsen (actor) =

Australian singer, actor, director and pianist

- Born: 28 February 1938 (age 87); Adelaide, South Australia
- Occupations: Actor; singer; pianist; director

Dennis Hans Olsen AM (born 28 February 1938) is an Australian singer, actor, director and pianist. His performances include opera, musical theatre, cabaret, radio, television and film. He is best known as an exponent of "patter" roles in Gilbert and Sullivan operas and his performances of Noël Coward songs.

At first trained as a pianist, Olsen soon switched to acting, beginning his career with Australian theatre companies in the 1960s. After success with Opera Australia, Olsen briefly joined the D'Oyly Carte Opera Company in England. He returned to Australia in 1971, playing in theatre as well as Gilbert and Sullivan over the next four decades.

== Early life and career ==
Olsen was born in Adelaide, South Australia, and is of Danish descent. He originally trained for a professional career as a pianist. He decided to become an actor and attended the National Institute of Dramatic Art in Sydney, graduating in 1962. He has appeared with the following theatre companies: Old Tote Theatre Company, State Theatre Company of South Australia, Melbourne Theatre Company and Sydney Theatre Company. Some of the plays in which Olsen has appeared include: The Importance of Being Earnest, The Crucible and The Venetian Twins.

In 1969, Olsen attracted notice as a guest artist playing the patter roles in the Australian Opera's productions of Gilbert and Sullivan's H.M.S. Pinafore, Iolanthe and The Pirates of Penzance. He then joined the D'Oyly Carte Opera Company in England. In 1970–71, Olsen spent a season in the D'Oyly Carte Opera Company understudying John Reed in the comic roles, as well as being a member of the chorus, and touring both England and the European continent during his tenure with the company. He hoped to become John Reed's successor in the comic roles with D'Oyly Carte Opera Company, but returned to Australia when it became clear that Reed had no intention of retiring from the company for some time.

Olsen rejoined Australian Opera in 1971–72, playing Ko-Ko in The Mikado and the Duke of Plaza-Toro in The Gondoliers in Sydney, Melbourne and Canberra. The following year, he starred in An Ideal Husband and The Cherry Orchard on tour in Australia. For the latter, he won Melbourne's Erik Award for best actor of the year. He played Bunthorne in Australian Opera's 1980 production of Patience, recording the role in 1995 at the Sydney Opera House. Olsen recorded Gilbert and Sullivan Highlights with Thomas Edmonds in 1978 and 1979 and also recorded Together with Music with June Bronhill. He directed as well as starred in a State Opera of South Australia production of H.M.S. Pinafore (as Sir Joseph Porter), which was broadcast on ABC television in 1981. The production also starred Thomas Edmonds (as Ralph Rackstraw) and Judith Henley (as Josephine).

Olsen sang the role of the Lord Chancellor in the production of Iolanthe in the opening performance of the Lyric Opera of Queensland, in Brisbane in 1984. He played Major General Stanley in the Adelaide season of Opera Australia's tour of The Pirates of Penzance, as well as covering the role for the extent of Reg Livermore's illness during the Melbourne season. His other Gilbert and Sullivan roles have included Robin Oakapple in Ruddigore, the Learned Judge in Trial by Jury, Jack Point in The Yeomen of the Guard and Don Alhambra in The Gondoliers. He was awarded a Churchill Fellowship in 1985 to study operetta production in Europe, and he subsequently directed many stage productions, including Gilbert and Sullivan operas, Countess Maritza and The Czardas Princess by Emmerich Kálmán, and the Mozart operas The Abduction from the Seraglio and Così fan tutte.

== Later career ==
In 1991, Olsen appeared as George Grossmith (the original Gilbert and Sullivan comic lead) in a one-man show called A Song to Sing, O, which had been written for John Reed in 1981. Olsen's production opened in Victoria in June 1991 followed by a tour including South Australia and Western Australia (July) and the Australian Capital Territory and Queensland (September). He directed Trial by Jury and played the Learned Judge in the Sydney Festival's 1997–98 production.

In October 2000 in Melbourne, Olsen appeared in the Production Company's presentation, in association with the Melbourne Festival, of The Gilbert & Sullivan Show, which represented a family party with some of the family members gathering in a parlor and singing Gilbert and Sullivan songs to entertain the other family members at the party. Appearing with the Gilbert & Sullivan Society of South Australia, Olsen sang the roles of Major-General Stanley in their 2004 production of The Pirates of Penzance and Bunthorne in their 2006 production of Patience. He also appeared in their concert production, An Evening with Dennis Olsen, to celebrate the 125th anniversary of the Law Society of South Australia in 2004.

Olsen is a popular exponent of Noël Coward and appeared in a one-man combined Noël Coward/Gilbert & Sullivan show, as well as a Coward production, Marvellous Party!, with Amanda Muggleton at the Cremorne Theatre of the Queensland Performing Arts Centre. In July 2006, he played the role of Antonio Salieri in the production of Peter Shaffer's Amadeus in Perth. He has also appeared in cabaret and on radio.

== Honours ==
In 1987, Olsen was appointed a Member of the Order of Australia (AM) for services to the performing arts.

In 2008, Olsen was made a patron of the Gilbert & Sullivan Society of South Australia Inc.

== Filmography ==
=== Films ===
- The Fourth Wish (1976) as Ross
- Break of Day (1976) as Roger
- Struck by Lightning (1990) as Barnabas

=== Television mini-series ===
- Sara Dane (1982)
- Under Capricorn (1983)
