= Margaret Nisbett =

Australian singer (1929–2023)

Margaret Josephine Nisbett MBE (9 January 1929 – 2 July 2023) was an Australian coloratura soprano.

== Biography ==
Margaret Nisbett was born in Preston, Victoria. She had an older sister, Coral (Capelin).

Nisbett always loved music and, as a child, performed small concerts at home with her sister, as well as at her local Church of England. She attended Tyler Street Primary School in Preston and later Preston Girls High School until the age of 15 (typical for the time) and showed a great interest in French, History and Painting. Upon leaving school she trained as a shorthand typist and worked in that field for a time.

Nisbett married Jon Weaving in 1952, and their only child, Jon Hugh Weaving, was born in 1955. They separated in 1959. She had one grandson, Talon Ashley Weaving, born 1985.

Margaret lived in the family home in Victoria, until her death on 2 July 2023, at the age of 94.

== Career ==
Margaret started piano and singing lessons with Thelma Ford when she was nine years old. During those first five years of training she competed in The Royal South Street Competition (Ballarat). Later, whilst working as a typist, Margaret also competed in many singing competitions and performed at concerts. She joined the National Theatre School where she studied opera for 2 years and performed in many operas.

In 1947, at age 18, Margaret was given her "big break". While still working full-time, as well as studying, she was understudying the lead role of Gilda in Rigoletto, which was being performed at Melbourne's Princess Theatre. Due to the leading lady falling ill and with only 24 hours notice, she was asked to perform the lead role on opening night. This was a great success, receiving the first of many standing ovations and immediately establishing her as a new "star" of the operatic stage..

Nisbett continued studying (her singing teacher during that time was Pauline Bindley, a famous operatic soprano of the bel canto style) and entered many of the biggest singing competitions in Australia, including Geelong, Ballarat and the Mobil Quest. Conductor and (future) TV producer Hector Crawford created the famous Mobil Quest in 1949 and it seems unlikely that any other country in the world had, at the time, the same sort of serious singing competition on radio solely concerned with "bringing to the attention of the public the best vocal talent available in the Commonwealth", and requiring each competitor to sing an operatic aria. The second winner of the rich Mobil Quest prize (in 1950) was Joan Sutherland. Margaret Nisbett won the Mobil Quest in 1951 and amongst the other finalists that year was soprano June Bronhill. The finalists toured Australia with conductor Hector Crawford. Margaret Nisbett's prize included the opportunity to study opera overseas and, in 1954, she departed for England with her husband, Jon, where she continued studies under Dino Borgioli and Clive Carey, who was also Joan Sutherland's teacher.

Nisbett's previous experience as a typist enabled her to continue singing lessons, while auditioning for opera companies. The group of expat singers and musicians with whom she was friendly included Richard Bonynge, Joan Sutherland and June Bronhill.

Nisbett was in great demand by a number of opera companies; she sang full-time with London's Sadlers Wells for 8 years as one of their leading ladies. Her roles included Adele in Die Fledermaus, Gilda in Rigoletto, Susanna in The Marriage of Figaro. During this time she also performed for BBC (British Broadcasting Corporation) TV and Radio.

Nisbett returned to Australia in late 1962.

In 1965 she was approached by the Australian Broadcasting Corporation (ABC) to perform a series of operas for TV, with the Melbourne Symphony Orchestra. She performed the role of Maria in The Sound of Music touring Australia for 15 months, including at the Sydney Opera House. Nisbett performed a successful 36-week series on ABC TV, Margaret Nisbett Operetta. During the 1960s, Margaret was a regular guest on the Melbourne variety show In Melbourne Tonight, hosted by Graham Kennedy.

During this time she also performed at Music for the People, a very popular concert series presented by the Government of Victoria and Melbourne City Council. They were held over Summer at Melbourne's Sidney Myer Music Bowl, as well as Victorian regional centres.

Nisbett toured regularly, performing cabaret at various interstate clubs and major venues.

Nisbett performed over a number of years at a great Melbourne institution, the Christmas Eve Carols by Candlelight for the Royal Victorian Institute for the Blind (RVIB) now Vision Australia during the 1970s. These are still held at the Sidney Myer Music Bowl.

Nisbett was a principal with the Melbourne Opera Company in the early 70s, performing with others such as Norman Yemm.

In the late 1970s, Nisbett toured Canada and the USA with Mervyn Simpson and the Footscray-Yarraville Brass Band. She was the compere and soloist. The Band won the prestigious World Championship Brass Band Competition during that time.

The State Concert Orchestra of Victoria was a Government funded concert series which toured metropolitan and regional Victoria. Nisbett was a soloist for many years. Other artists included baritone John Lidgerwood.

In the early 1990s, Nisbett reduced her public performances and commenced a successful career teaching singing. She still had many private pupils and has just (2009) completed a 17-year engagement with the Melba Conservatorium of Music, in Melbourne. Margaret's pupils include Helena Dix and Christopher Diffey, both having undertaken operatic careers in the UK.

== Honours ==
Nisbett was appointed Member of the Order of the British Empire (MBE) in the 1980 Birthday Honours for services to Music. This was presented at Government House in Melbourne.

She also received the City of Preston (now Darebin City Council) Community Services Award for her musical contribution to the community.

== Recordings ==
1. "I Love to Sing" Fidelis Records late 1970s I love to sing
2. "Songs of Faith Hope and Glory" Mervyn Simpson and Footscray-Yarraville City Band.
3. "The Great MacArthy Soundtrack" Bruce Smeaton

== Patronage ==
- Australian Girls Choir
