= Shell Aria contest =

The Shell Aria, originally Shell Open Aria, contest was an Australian vocal competition for young classical opera singers, held annually in Canberra from 1955 to 1986, named for and sponsored by, Shell Australia in conjunction with the Australian National Eisteddfod Society (founded 1938).

The prize was particularly valuable — £1,000 cash, a year's wages for most workers. It was later redefined as a scholarship, which must be used in training overseas — a condition of eligibility. In 1966 the prize was translated to $2,000, an exact conversion, but thanks to inflation and devaluation, a fraction of the prize's original value. In 1970 it was increased to $3,000 then $4,000 in 1976. and from 1982 the winner could substitute a six-month contract with the Australian Opera for overseas travel depending on voice type. Among successful finalists who went on to international careers were Jennifer Eddy, Robert Bickerstaff, Yvonne Minton, Raymond Myers, Richard Greager, Gillian Sullivan, Jonathan Summers, Sandra Hahn and Thomas Edmonds.

At first, all heats and judging were held in Canberra, but from 1983, with the involvement of Australian Opera, Queensland Lyric Opera, Victorian State Opera, State Opera of South Australia, and Western Australian Opera, preliminary heats took place in each State capital, with the finalists being flown to Canberra for the Finals.

== Prizewinners ==
Year	Winner	2nd	3rd
1955	Jennifer Eddy	Valerie Collins	Geoffrey Chard
1956	Valerie Collins	Robert Bickerstaff	Neil Warren-Smith
1957	Gloria McDonall	Russell Cooper	Kevin Mills
1958	Robert Bickerstaff	June Barron	Nita Maughan
1959	Kevin Stumbles	June Barton	Arthur Mee
1960	Yvonne Minton	Elaine Blight	Roslyn Dunbar
1961	June Barton	Patricia Connop	Waverney Ford
1962	Patricia Woolridge	Janice Hearne	Robert Haase
1963	Raymond Myers	Barry Purcell	Geoffrey Harnett
1964	Jan Bartlett	Marion Miller	Thomas McDonnell
1965	Pettine-Anne Croul	Waverney Ford	Ian Holston
1966	Judith Turner	Geoffrey Harnett	George Hogg
1967	Valerie Hanlon	John Pringle	Thomas Edmonds
1968	Geraldine Hackett-Jones	Thomas Edmonds	George Hogg
1969	Thomas Edmonds	Margaret Garrett	Ian Holston
1970	Richard Greager	Phillip Langshaw	David Smith
1971	Phillip Langshaw	(not found)	Janet Allan
1972	Peter Pianella	Maxwell Jarman	Yvonne Laki
1973	John Pickering	Jacqueline Chapman	Jonathan Summers
1974	Jonathan Summers	Frances Chambers	Christopher Field
1975	Wendy Verco	Kenneth Cornish	Rex Taylor
1976	Irene Tirbutt	Carole McKenzie	Douglas Gibbs
1977	Gillian Sullivan (as Gillian Wood)	Marie Driscoll	Linda Elder
1978	Jenny Lindfield	John Fulford	Constantine Mavridis
1979	Sandra Hahn	John Fulford	Amanda Thane
1980	John Fulford	Joanne Neal	Colin Slater
1981	Barry Ryan	Rosemary Boyle	Claire Primrose
1982	Sussanne Towers	Helen Burnham	Christine Beasley
1983	Fiona Maconaghie	Suzanne Johnston	Louise Camens
1984	Christine Farraro	Roger Lemke	Gregory Tomlinson
1985	Karen Sourry	Stephen Bennett	Anna Connolly
1986	Peter Coleman-Wright	Fiona Janes	Elisa Wilson

There was no 1987 contest. Shell Australia withdrew from sponsorship and distanced itself from the Australian National Eisteddfod Society. Instead, it became a partner with Opera Foundation Australia, as sponsor of The Shell Royal Opera House Covent Garden Scholarship, the first competition to be held in Adelaide on 10 May 1987.

== See also ==
- Melbourne Sun Aria, a similar contest
- Mobil Quest
- South Street Society
