= Frederic Beard =

English organist and choirmaster

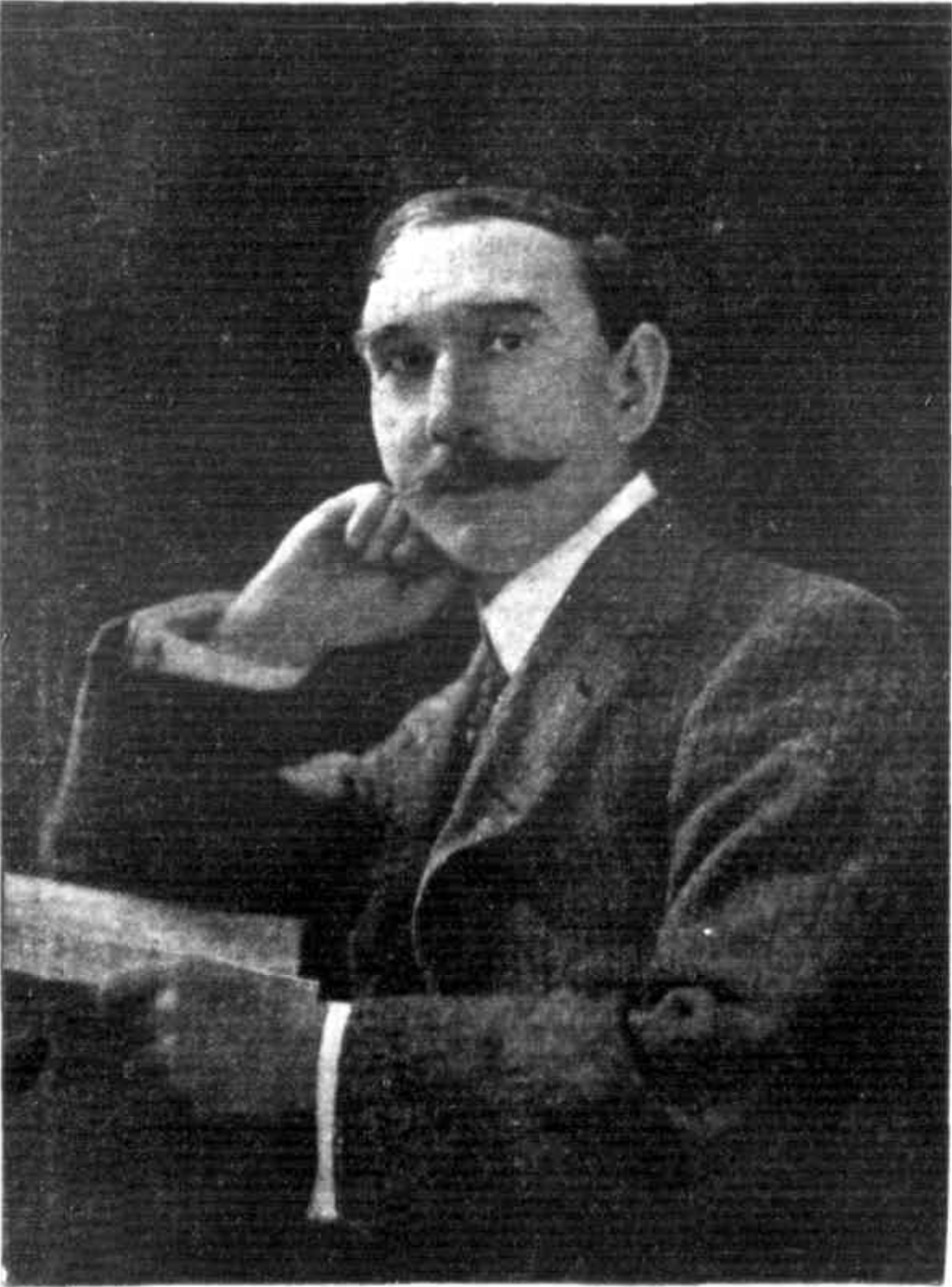
Frederic Beard

Frederic William Beard (c. 1865 – 5 May 1912) was an English organist and choirmaster, remembered in Australia for his influence on choral and symphonic musicianship.

== History ==
Beard was organist in Birmingham, England, and director of the city's Choral Society.

=== Australia ===
After an invitation was extended by organiser W. D. Hill, Beard adjudicated at the 1906 South Street Competitions, the annual eisteddfod in Ballarat, at which St. Augustine's Orphan Boys Band of Geelong won the band contest, to universal acclaim, and their leader, Percy Jones, as a cornetist was considered the equal of John Paley, champion cornet player of England. Beard decided to settle in Melbourne, and following an invitation by the (Roman Catholic) Archbishop of Melbourne, Thomas Carr, he was appointed organist and choirmaster of St Patrick's Cathedral, with the remit to carry out Pope Pius X's reforms in ecclesiastical music. He succeeded Fred Clutsam, brother of George Clutsam, as conductor of Melbourne's Orpheus Society, which became the Victorian Festival Choir during his tenure. A performance by the choir of Beethoven's Choral Symphony on 26 November 1910 with the Victorian Professional Orchestra, led by George Watson, was praised.

=== Death ===
In November 1911 Beard returned to Britain for a holiday and, following a tour of Europe, boarded the RMS Orsova intending to return to Melbourne. Concerns were raised when he failed to reply to telegrams left for him at Fremantle and further enquiries revealed that he had died of appendicitis en route at Colombo. His loss was felt deeply by members of the Festival Choir, the National Operatic Society and the Students' Choir. Dean Phelan movingly referred to his death during a service at St Patrick's Cathedral.

=== Memorial ===
Members of the Victorian Festival Choir, and, other musical societies of Melbourne, subscribed to a memorial in the form of a Celtic cross, made of Harcourt granite, to be installed at the Colombo cemetery; it was temporarily erected in Royal Park, near the Burke and Wills' memorial. The inscription read:—

In loving memory of Frederic W. Beard, musician choirmaster, who died at Colombo, 5th May, 1912, aged 46 years. Erected by the members of the Victorian Festival Choir, St. Patrick's Choir, National Operatic Society, and other friends. 'And the tear that we shed, tho' in secret it rolls, Shall, long keep his memory green in our souls. Requiescat in pace.

Accompanying the tribute were lines from Cécile Chaminade's "The Little Silver Ring", one of his favorite songs:

"E'en as a ribbon placed
About fair living flow'rs
Still hold the self-same flow'rs
When their short life is done.

Frank Brennan MHR deputized for the Archbishop at the dedication, praising the work of stonemason M. P. Jageurs, mentioning that he had informed Sir Edward Elgar of the great loss to Melbourne's music circles. The combined choirs then concluded with Arthur Sullivan's "The Long Day Closes", after which the gathering dispersed.

Paul Beard (1901–1989), a nephew, was also a musician, a fine violinist.
