= Opera for the People =

Opera for the People was an Australian commercial radio program produced and conducted by Hector Crawford. Well-known operas were retold by a narrator and actors, punctuated with their most tuneful arias, performed by some of Australia's best singers, backed with a symphony orchestra. Most were spread over two half-hour segments, but could be played as one continuous program. The long-running series also sold to New Zealand, Canada and Hawaii, and was copied elsewhere. The program was broadcast on 3DB, from 19 November 1946 to 20 March 1949; 21 operas were presented in this format, most were played twice — whether fresh productions or old recordings replayed was not divulged. Originally scheduled for Tuesdays at 8 pm, from 2 March 1947 3DB and 3LK broadcast the program on Sunday evenings at 7 pm, the slot previously occupied by the serial Melba.

Crawford ran an Opera for the People quest in Sydney, broadcast 3DB and 53 other stations throughout Australia – the largest commercial radio hookup to that date — 27 June 1947.

== Episodes ==
- La Bohème on 19, 26 November 1946. With soprano Glenda Raymond, tenor John Lanigan, baritone William Laird, and bass Maxwell Cohen.
- Faust 3, 10, 17 December 1946. Repeated 11, 18, 23 February 1947.
- The Barber of Seville 24 December.
- Maritana 31 December, 7 January 1947. Repeated 6, 13 July 1947; 23, 30 May 1948
- La Traviata 14, 21 January 1947. Repeated 27 April, 4 May 1947; 6, 13 June 1948
- Pagliacci 28 January, 4 February. With John Lanigan, William Laird, Glenda Raymond, and Kelvin Plant. Repeated 3, 10 August.
- Rigoletto 2, 9 March 1947. Repeated 30 March, 6 April 1947; 31 August, 7 September; and 23, 30 January 1949
- Lucia di Lammermoor 16, 23 March 1947 Repeated 28 September, 5 October 1947.
- Il Trovatore 13, 20 April 1947. Repeated 26 October, 2 November 1947; 22 August 1948 and another date.
- Romeo and Juliet 11 May, 18 May 1947. With John Lanigan, Glenda Raymond. Repeated 23, 30 November 1947.
- Tales of Hoffmann 25 May, 1, 8. With June William Howard, David Allen, Wyn Laird. Repeated 21, 28 December 1947; and again on 5, 12 September 1948.
- Don Giovanni 15, 22 June. With Maxwell Cohen, Glenda Raymond, John Lanigan and David Allen. Narrator, as with other productions, was Eric Pearce. Repeated 4, 11 April 1948.
- Tannhauser 20, 27 July. With Sylvia Fisher. Repeated 2 May and another date 1948; 3 October and another date 1948.
- Cavalleria Rusticana 17, 24 August.
- The Bohemian Girl 14, 21 September 1947. Repeated 20, 27 June 1948.
- The Marriage of Figaro 12, 19 October 1947. Repeated 4 July and one other date 1948.
- La Tosca 7, 14 December. With Eleanor Houston, John Lanigan, William Laird. Repeated 20, 27 February 1949.
- Mignon 22, 29 February 1948. With Gunter Hirschberg (formerly cantor at Temple Emanuel in Sydney).
- Daughter of the Regiment 7, 14 March 1948. Repeated 9, 16 January 1949.
- Martha 1, 8 August 1948. With John Lanigan, Noella Cornish, David Allen, Charles Skase, and Glenda Raymond. Repeated 14, 21 November.
- Carmen 6, 13 February 1949.
- Highlights of Opera 21 March 1948; 18 April 1948; 16 May 1948. With Glenda Raymond, John Lanigan, David Allen, and Valentine Stewart. Repeated 26 September 1948.

== Concerts ==
The first public concert in the series was held at the Melbourne Botanic Gardens on Saturday 3 March 1947, with singers Glenda Raymond, John Lanigan, William Laird, David Allen, and Ailsa MacKenzie reprising their parts in the radio adaptation of Rigoletto. The concert was broadcast live by Victorian radio stations 3DB-3LK, 3BA (Ballarat), 3BO (Bendigo), and 3GL (Geelong), and worldwide through Radio Australia.

An Opera for the People concert was held 30 June 1947 at the Melbourne Town Hall in aid of the YWCA. Soloists included John Lanigan, Maxwell Cohen, Glenda Raymond and Noella Cornish; accompanist, Eunice Garland. £709 was raised.

A concert by the stars of Opera for the People was held on 8 August 1947 in the Horsham Town Hall, in aid of the Horsham Base Hospital.

== Reviews ==
- "A praiseworthy and ambitious new venture for 3DB by Hector Crawford Productions", Donald Weaver, The Herald.
- The arias seem to flow naturally from the dialogue, and there is not the musical comedy effect which might so easily have been created by such a method of presentation. Glenda Raymond is exquisite; William Laird's fine baritone seems to be gaining in richness. As a rule, I find a tenor the least attractive of masculine voices, but John Lanigan's voice is one of outstanding beauty, and his diction is perfect.
