= Shaun Davies (activist) =

Australian activist and linguist

Shaun Davies ALing
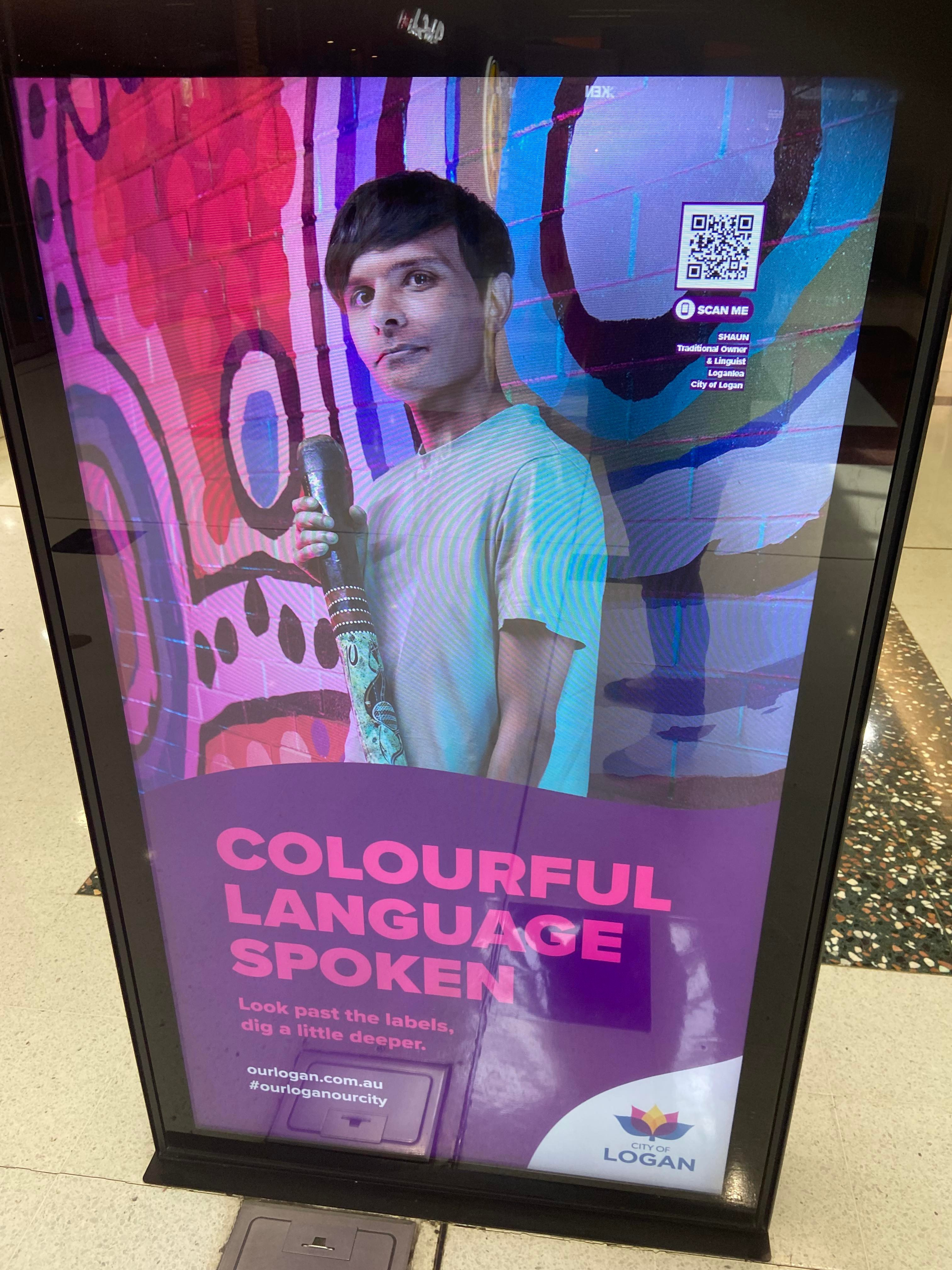
- Davies in shopping centre signage at Redbank Queensland, 2021
- Occupation: Linguist
- Known for: Advocating for Yugambeh language and culture
- Board member of: Yugambeh Land Enterprises

Shaun Davies ALing (/ˈdeɪviːz/ DAY-veez) is an Aboriginal Australian language activist, linguist, radio personality, and actor. He is known for his advocacy work with the Yugambeh language and culture, as well as appearances in various media.

== Early and personal life ==
Shaun is a member of the Yugambeh people, an Australian Aboriginal group whose traditional lands are located in South East Queensland and the Northern Rivers area of New South Wales. Davies is the great-great-grandson of Julia Ford née Sandy (c.1860–1896), an Aboriginal woman who has the sole tombstone in the Deebing Creek Aboriginal Cemetery; Julia was a native Aboriginal woman from the Southport area of the Gold Coast and married Arthur Ford (c.1866–1954) at Nerang in 1883, Arthur was an Aboriginal man from the Murwillumbah region in northern New South Wales. Shaun grew up and has spent the majority of his life in Logan City, an area his family had lived in before the arrival of Europeans. As a child, he was taught Yugambeh dreamtime legends from his Elders, such as that of the janjarri (the Yugambeh Yowie), a spirit that guards the region from trespassers. As creative, Davies uses stories passed from his family line to increase awareness and appreciation for his traditional culture and language.

While in tenth grade Shaun attended a career expo at the Brisbane Showgrounds, becoming fascinated with a booth set up by Youth For Understanding Davies subsequently did a 3-month student exchange program in France where he discovered his passion for endangered languages, like Galician. Upon returning to Australia and informing his grandmother Joan and her sister, they implored him to learn their lingo. Shaun learnt his Yugambeh language from his maternal grandmother, who was from the Beaudesert area, while his maternal grandfather was from Tweed Heads. Davies has recorded talk in conversations with the linguist Margaret Sharpe, his grandmother grew up with Joe Culham, who Sharpe (then Cunningham) had recorded language from in 1968.

In his spare time, Shaun enjoys the Star Trek: Discovery series, finding the show's Xenolinguistics and other themes thought-provoking.

Shaun speaking Yugambeh language

== Career ==
=== Linguistics and technology ===
Shaun is a linguist who has worked for the Commonwealth-endorsed regional language centres for South East Queensland since 2014. Following its establishment as the region's new Commonwealth-endorsed language centre in 2022, he became the resident linguist of the South East Queensland Indigenous Language Centre (SEQILC). He previously served as the Language Research Officer at the Yugambeh Museum Language and Heritage Research Centre.

Describing social media as the new "campfire" and technology's central importance in keeping Indigenous languages alive for future generations, Davies has worked with Snapchat, aided the development and expansion of the Yugambeh App, and the creation of Google's 'Woolaroo' – an open-source photo-translation platform. He has written/translated songs for the Yugambeh Youth choir and provided Yugambeh interpretations for Ellen van Neerven's poetry. Davies has conducted additional linguistic work on the Yugambeh–Bundjalung languages and collected good evidence that previous classifications of the dialect chain have over differentiated between the varieties.

=== Media and broadcasting ===
Shaun hosted Learn the Lingo on ABC Gold Coast – a radio show discussing Yugambeh language and other cultural subjects from 2015 to 2017, and in 2019 appeared in the State Library of Queensland's Spoken exhibition discussing his personal history with the Yugambeh language. In 2020, Davies had a voice over role in the Australian Broadcasting Corporation's Yugambeh language series Languages of our Land, as well as appearing in Disney's Spread the Word. The following year, he appeared in the ABC documentary series Back to Nature where he guided the hosts through the Yugambeh language and stories associated with the Springbrook area. In late 2021, Davies was announced as an ambassador for the Proud City of Logan campaign, a local government initiative featuring six local champions, chosen to represent the diversity of people and lifestyles in the city. Later in 2022, he guest starred in an episode of No Offence! on the ABC. In March of 2023, Davies appeared weekly on Radio National Awaye's Word Up!, each episode featuring a different Yugambeh word and its history.

=== Community leadership and advocacy ===
Davies is an activist for Aboriginal language, and has advocated for the use of Indigenous place names over their contemporary English names, calling for Burleigh Heads and Mt Warning to be known by their Yugambeh names, Jellurgal and Wollumbin. This was opposed by Australian senator Pauline Hanson, while the Member for Burleigh, Michael Hart, was in favour so long as it was solely landmarks. Hanson subsequently featured the discussion on her Please Explain YouTube channel. Shaun is involved in protecting Yugambeh cultural heritage and land, being part of the consultation for the Gold Coast Light Rail construction's at Jebribillum Bora Ring and a Cultural Heritage Coordinator. He is also the treasurer of the Yugambeh Land Enterprises, an elected Representative for the Birinburra clan and Native Title applicant.

Shaun denounced the Morrison government's 2022 High Court challenge to the precedent established in Love v Commonwealth that Aboriginal Australians (understood according to the 3-part test in Mabo v Queensland (No 2)) are not within the reach of the Commonwealth's "aliens" power; Davies called the Government's actions a step backwards for Australia that undermined the foundations of Aboriginal identity. Following the 2022 Australian federal election, Shaun praised the newly elected Albanese government's decision to dismiss the case, allowing Love to remain precedent. Davies was quoted in a local news article criticising the failure of NSW National Parks & Wildlife Service to engage with the Murangburra clan of the Yugambeh people, condemning the closure of Wollumbin National Park and ensuing public controversy, which was done without the involvement of the local families. Following a protest by hikers on Australia Day in 2024, Shaun was quoted again in a debate between 2GB's Ben Fordham and NSW State Minister Penny Sharpe with Fordham questioning why Davies and other Indigenous leaders were being ignored.

=== Public speaking and ceremonies ===
Alongside Cameron Dick in 2018, Shaun opened Siemens' Fusesaver facility in Yatala, delivering a Welcome to Country. He was part of the official opening of Screen Forever 36, and Tourism and Events Queensland's annual DestinationQ Forum in 2022, where he conducted the Welcome to Countries. Shaun returned for a second consecutive year to perform the Welcome to Country for Screen Forever 37, and again for Screen Forever 38.

== Filmography ==
=== Radio ===
Year	Title	Role	Notes
2015–2017	Learn the Lingo	Co-Host	ABC Gold Coast
2022	Classic Breakfast	Himself	Interview ABC Classic
2023	AWAYE!	Guest	Episodes: Mibuladululbay, Wayjang, Nyliah, Yugambeh Word Up! Segment Radio National

=== Television series ===
Year	Title	Role	Notes
2019	Spread the Word	Himself	Episode 2: Garu-galen
2020	Languages of our Land	Voice Over	10 episodes
2021	Back to Nature	Himself	Episode 1: The Green Cauldron
2022	Language and Me	Himself	ABC Special
2022	Gardening Australia	Linguist & Language Research Officer	Credits for Oh Christmas Tree (Yerrbill with Clarence)
2022	No Offence!	Himself	Episode 3: Yugambeh

=== Film ===
Year	Title	Role	Notes
2022	Gold Coast Film Festival 20th Anniversary	Voice Over	Mini-Documentary, A Gold Coast Film Festival production; Also First Nations Linguist

== Bibliography ==
- Davies, S. (2022, 27 May – 3 June). Token Politics: The Semiotics of Yugambeh-Bundjalung Ethnonyms [Conference presentation]. Australian Institute for Aboriginal and Torres Strait Islander Studies Summit 2022, Noosa, Qld, Australia.
- Davies, S. (2022, 8 July – 10 July). Your language is dead: Go learn Bundjalung — Those who said Yugambeh [Conference presentation]. Australian Languages Workshop 2022, Dunwich, Queensland: Australian Research Council Centre of Excellence for the Dynamics of Language. pp. 1–19.

=== Children's books ===
- Davies, S. (2026). Gali...: This Is... Illustrated by Joel Kyle-Maher. Goomp Goomp Books. ISBN 9781763609105

=== Translations ===
- Deadly Kindy Burragah. (2021). Nyungai Ngullina Nyumbajaburuyah Buuragah | Our Day at Burragah Kindy. Translated by Shaun Davies (Yugambeh Museum), illustrated by Deadly Kindy Burragah. Aboriginal & Torres Strait Islander Community Health Service Brisbane Limited. ISBN 0646845810

== See also ==
- Yugambeh language
- Yugambeh people
- Jebribillum Bora Park
- Logan City, Queensland
