= Marjorie Margaret Conley =

Australian operatic soprano (1931–1959)

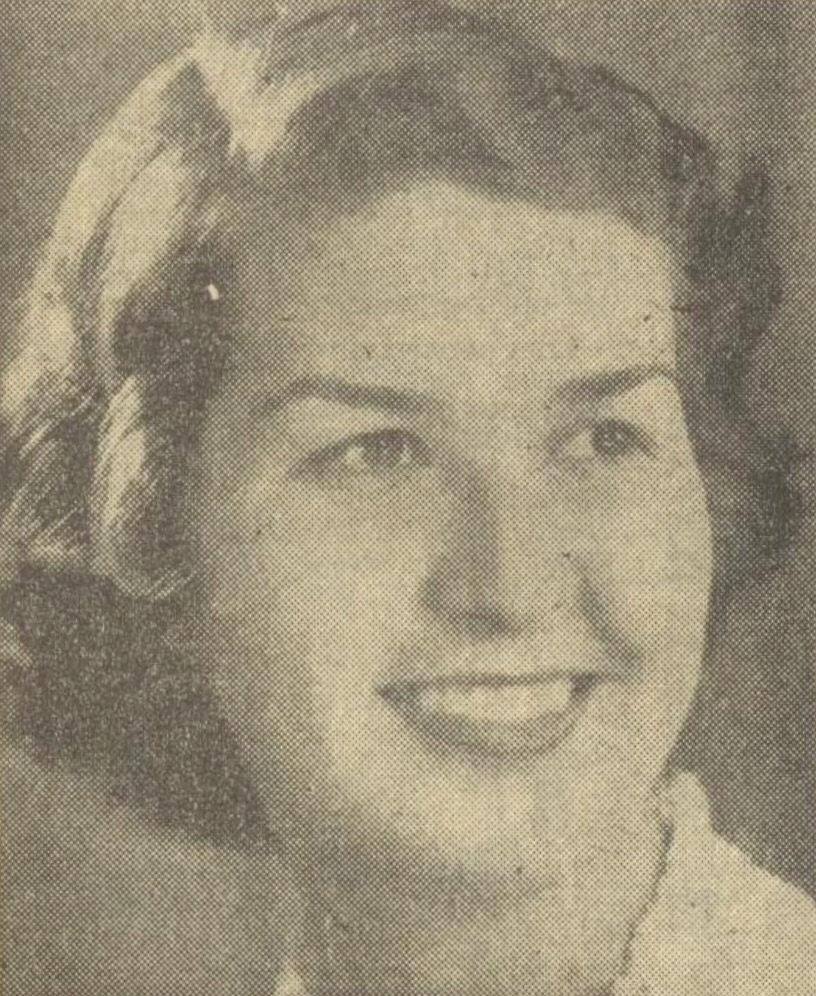
- Conley in 1951
- Born: 24 June 1931; Stanmore, Sydney, New South Wales, Australia
- Died: 11 August 1959 (aged 28); Brisbane, Queensland, Australia
- Burial place: Woronora Cemetery, Sydney, New South Wales, Australia
- Education: New South Wales State Conservatorium of Music
- Employer: Australian Elizabethan Theatre Trust
- Spouse: Geoffrey Chard (m. 1956)
- Children: 1
- Awards: ABC Young Performers Award; Mobil Quest

Marjorie Margaret Conley (24 June 1931 – 11 August 1959) was an Australian operatic soprano.

== Biography ==
Marjorie Conley was born on 24 June 1931 in Stanmore, Sydney, New South Wales. Her parents were Queenslanders Henry Conley, a baker, and his wife Evelyn Conley (née Wightman).

Conley was educated at Mascot and Gardeners Road public schools and learned to play the piano at Our Lady of the Sacred Heart Convent. She then studied at the New South Wales State Conservatorium of Music, undertaking advanced vocal work with Florence Taylor.

In 1951, Conley performed as a soloist with the Victorian Symphony Orchestra, conducted by Kurt Wöss. In 1952, she won the national vocal section of the prestigious ABC Young Performers Awards. That year she toured with the ABC. Conley won the Dame Nellie Melba Cup in 1953 and the Mobil Quest in 1955. In 1953, Conley sang the lead operatic roles for Clarice Lorenz's Opera Australia, including at the first performance of John Antill's Endymion.

Conley married baritone Geoffrey Chard on 5 May 1956 at St Mark's Anglican Church, Darling Point, Sydney. After their marriage, Conley and her husband both joined the Australian Elizabethan Theatre Trust (AETT) company for the inaugural Mozart season of 1956. Conley sang as Fiordiligi in Così fan tutte and as Pamina in The Magic Flute with the company.

Conley and her husband had a son together, David, in 1957. She collapsed due to a cerebral haemorrhage while holidaying with her young family at Surfers Paradise. She died three weeks later on 11 August 1959 at Brisbane, Queensland, aged 28. She was buried at Woronora Cemetery, Sydney.
