= Thomas Edmonds (tenor) =

Australian operatic tenor (born 1934)

Thomas James Edmonds AM (born 1934) is an Australian operatic tenor.

== Early life ==
One of six children, Edmonds was born to tenant farmers outside Peterborough, South Australia. He graduated from the University of Adelaide and the Adelaide Teachers College with a Diploma of Teaching and Education and a Bachelor of Arts. In 1961 he became a foundation member of the staff of Westminster School in Marion, and in 1965, he was appointed deputy headmaster of the school.

Edmonds began his singing studies in Australia in 1960 and, in 1970, he continued both singing and education studies in England and Europe.

== Career ==
An internationally renowned opera singer, he has appeared in oratorios and many operas, including Mozart operas Don Giovanni (as "Don Ottavio"), and The Abduction From the Seraglio (as "Belmonte"), amongst others.

He also appeared in State Opera of South Australia production of the Gilbert and Sullivan opera H.M.S. Pinafore as Ralph Rackstraw, alongside Dennis Olsen and Judith Henley. The production was broadcast throughout Australia as a simultaneous television and stereo radio broadcast, by the ABC.

Edmonds has sung in opera at the Royal Opera House and the Edinburgh Festival and has appeared with the BBC as well as appearing in concert in the UK and Europe.

He was one of the judges at the 51st Adelaide Eisteddfod in April 2006.

== Personal life ==
Edmonds is married to mezzo-soprano Elizabeth Campbell; the couple live in Mount Barker, South Australia.

== Life history ==
Taking its title from an aria in Handel's Messiah, Edmonds traced his life in his 2024 memoir Ev'ry Valley – A Tenor's Journey.

He was interviewed in 2019 by Vincent Plush on his life and opera career. The recording can be found at the National Library of Australia.

== Awards ==
- Won eight successive grand finals of Independent Television System's (now Network 10) talent show Showcase, beginning with Showcase 68, in which he won both the judges' vote and the television viewers' vote.
- Won the Shell Aria contest, run in conjunction with the 1969 Australian National Eisteddfod, Canberra after two years' contention as runner-up.
- Medal of the Order of Australia (OAM) in 1982
- Member of the Order of Australia (AM) in the 1987 Queen's Birthday Honours.

== Recordings ==
Thomas Edmonds recordings with RCA includes:

- The Voice of Thomas Edmonds
- Wonderful Day, with Thomas Edmonds
- Thomas Edmonds on Tour
- Songs of the Open Road
- Remember with Thomas Edmonds
- Thomas Edmonds Sings Opera
- Serenade in Italy
- Thomas Edmonds Sings Songs of Faith
- By Request
- Gilbert & Sullivan Highlights
