= Melba (radio serial) =

- Genre: drama serial
- Running time: 30 mins (7:30 pm – 8:00 pm)inc. adverts
- Country of origin: Australia
- Language(s): English
- Written by: John Ormiston Reid
- Produced by: Hector Crawford; Dorothy Crawford
- Recording studio: 3DB Melbourne
- Original release: 3 February 1946 – 25 January 1947
- No. of episodes: 50

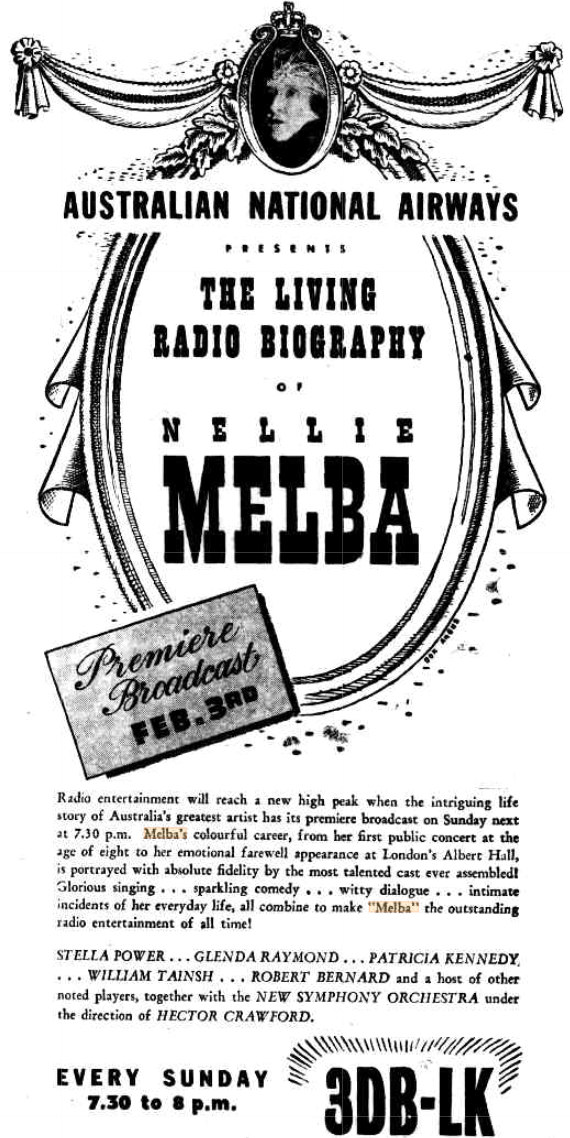
Advertisement 2 Feb 1946

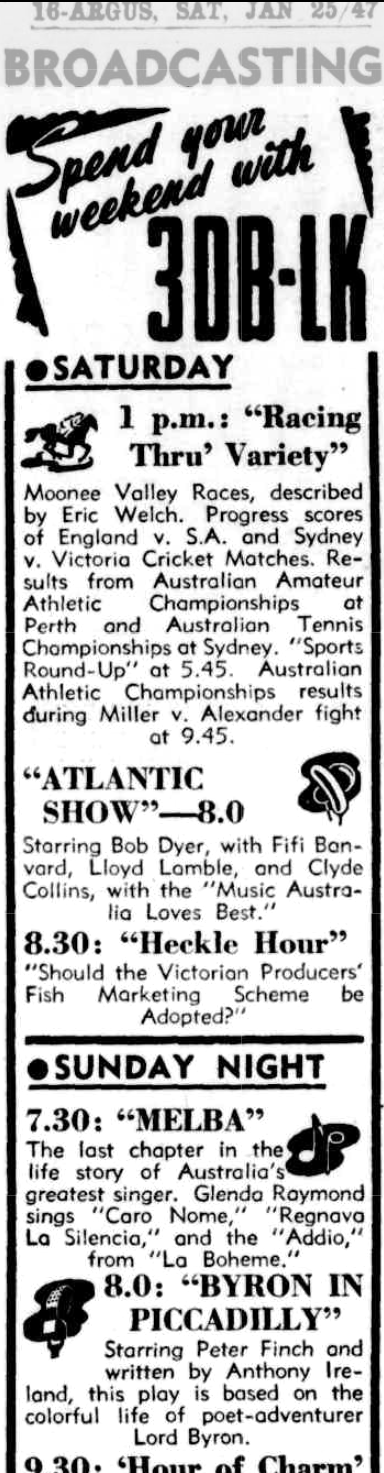
Advertisement 25 Jan 1947

Melba is a 1946 Australian radio drama about the life of Nellie Melba. and first broadcast by stations 3DB and 3LK 1946–1947 in fifty 30-minute episodes. It was produced by Hector Crawford, who knew Melba.

The scripting involved months of research.

Four actresses played Melba:

- Eight-year-old Kareen Wilson spoke and sang the young Melba — "Comin' Thro' the Rye" and "See Me Dance the Polka" in the Richmond Town Hall. She was the daughter of baritone Ernest Wilson and soprano Freda Northcote.
- Glenda Raymond, a coloratura soprano from Melbourne, sang all the arias of Melba in her emerging years, in the original key and hitting the same notes. She was a relative unknown, but had a subsequent career in opera, notably as Etain in Rutland Boughton's The Immortal Hour.
- Stella Power — dubbed "the Little Melba" by Melba herself — sang the mature Melba.
- Patricia Kennedy played the speaking "Nellie Mitchell that scarifies you with the rough side of her tongue" Melba, "a remarkable success", said the Adelaide Advertiser, For continuity, Kennedy played ever stage of Melba's life.

and many real-life friends and colleagues played themselves.

ABC Weekly said "The woven story is interesting and the music-dialogue balance nicely placed, with the story itself built on factual references to Melba’s career."

The Advocate said it was "very pleasant listening."
