= Dorothy Crawford =

Australian broadcaster (1911–1988)

- Born: Dorothy Muriel Turner Crawford; 21 March 1911; Fitzroy, Victoria, Australia
- Died: 2 September 1988 (aged 77); Camberwell, Victoria, Australia
- Other names: Dorothy Balderson; Dorothy Strong; Dorothy Smith
- Education: Albert Street Conservatorium
- Occupations: Actress, announcer, radio and television producer
- Years active: 1930s–1978
- Known for: Co-founder of Crawford Productions
- Spouse(s): Maxwell James Balderson (m. 1931; div. 1944) Roland Denniston Strong (m. 1948; div. 1968)
- Children: 1
- Family: Hector Crawford (brother)
- Awards: AWGIE Awards, Victorian Honour Roll of Women

Dorothy Muriel Turner Crawford (21 March 1911 – 2 September 1988), also known as Dorothy Balderson, Dorothy Strong, and Dorothy Smith, was an Australian actress and announcer, as well as a producer in radio and television, who, with her brother Hector Crawford, co-founded the important Australian broadcasting production company Crawford Productions.

== Early life ==
Crawford was born on 21 March 1911 at Fitzroy, Melbourne. Her father was a travelling salesperson and her mother was a musician, singer (contralto) and organist. Crawford's younger brother, Hector William Crawford (1913–1991), would also pursue a career in broadcasting.

Crawford won a scholarship to the Albert Street Conservatorium located in East Melbourne, where she was to study voice and piano.

== Career ==
Crawford began to win roles in radio dramas. In 1939 she was cast in the title role in 'Little Audrey', a live comedy series on the radio station 3UZ. Although aged 28, Crawford played the role of a young and naughty child.

Crawford became one of the Australian Broadcasting Corporation's first three female announcers in Victoria in March 1942, though she had to keep secret her 1931 marriage and the birth of her child because of the ABC's policy not to employ married women.

Dorothy and Hector founded Crawford Productions Pty Ltd (initially called Hector Crawford Productions) in 1945. Dorothy's role for the company was largely around production matters including script-editing, casting and producing each script. She served as producer on numerous radio series including a dramatisation of the life of Dame Nellie Melba, which was broadcast in 1946 and featured the soprano Glenda Raymond. The siblings subsidised their productions with The Crawford School of Broadcasting, which taught skills for working in radio, from the 1940s. Noel Ferrier recounts attending the school when he was about 17 or 18 to become a radio actor.

In 1954, Dorothy Crawford founded the Crawford TV Workshop, a school aimed at teaching young people skills for developing careers in television, a medium set to be introduced to Australian airwaves in 1956. A 1956 advertisement in The Argus reads:

Television.
Wonderful opportunities will be offering for people with ability who are trained and ready to take their place in Television and Radio. The Crawford TV Workshop gives expert tuition in TV Acting, Announcing, Writing, Ballet and Radio Acting in their Television Studio, elaborately equipped with television camera unit, sound stages, movie cameras, projectors, tape recorders &c. Write or Call for a Free Booklet. Crawford TV Workshop. 14 Little Collins Street. Telephone MF4911.

The Crawford TV Workshop ran until 1966.

Crawford prepared for the new age of television by conducting a study tour overseas in mid-1956. Crawford Productions began with the creation of quiz shows and game shows, including Wedding Day (1956) which began on Melbourne's HSV 7 station within two weeks of the station's commencement. The transition to television was risky, and Hector and Dorothy went without salaries for a year.

It was drama for which Crawford Productions was to become best known. Dorothy Crawford was executive producer and involved in the creation and production of significant pieces of Australian television history such as Homicide, Division 4, Matlock Police, All the Rivers Run, Cop Shop, and The Sullivans.

== Personal life ==
She married, in East St. Kilda in 1931, Maxwell James Balderson. They had a son Ian Crawford, who joined Crawford Productions in about 1953 in the music and sound effects department.

The press announced that she married Donald Ingram Smith in 1945, although they were not actually married; they had been close friends since 1942. On 23 December, she married radio producer Roland Denniston Strong, with Congregational forms; they had no children, and divorced some 20 years later in 1968.

Crawford developed early signs of Parkinson's disease in the 1960s.

== Honours ==
The Australian Writers' Guild honoured her with a special AWGIE Award for encouraging Australian writers in 1973.

In 2004, Dorothy Crawford was added to the Victorian Honour Roll of Women.

== Later life, death and legacy ==
Crawford retired in 1978.

From 1986, the Australian Writers' Guild presented an annual Dorothy Crawford Award for outstanding contribution to the profession.

Crawford died on 2 September 1988 at Camberwell, Melbourne.
