= J. Ord Hume =

English musician

- Born: 14 September 1864; Edinburgh, Scotland
- Died: 25 November 1932 (aged 68); North London, England
- Burial place: Edmonton, London cemetery
- Occupation: musician
- Known for: conductor and judge in brass band competitions
- Notable work: chief judge at the South Street Competitions in Ballarat, Victoria, Australia

Lieutenant James Ord Hume (14 September 1864 – 25 November 1932) was an English musician, remembered as a composer and arranger for brass bands, but in his time noted as a conductor and judge in brass band competitions.

== History ==
Hume was born in Edinburgh and joined the Royal Scots Guards in 1877. He played solo cornet with the Scots Greys in 1881, and left the army in 1887. While in the services he composed at least a hundred marches for military band, and has been credited with 300 compositions over his lifetime.

He was, by invitation, chief judge at the South Street Competitions in Ballarat, Victoria in 1902, subsequently visiting Sydney and Adelaide. He returned to Australia in 1924, when he was accompanied by his wife. He has been credited as the greatest single influence on the standard of Australian brass band performance.

He had a home in North London, where he died.

His remains were carried to Edmonton cemetery, accompanied by a massed band playing the "Dead March" from Saul and "Abide with Me", and interred to the strains of the hymns "Deep Harmony" and "The Angels' Song", Hume's last composition.

Instrumentalist, composer, arranger, adjudicator, he will for ever be remembered as the greatest figure ever known in the brass band world.
