= Richard Greager =

New Zealand opera singer

Richard Greagar (born 5 November 1946) is an operatic tenor from New Zealand.

== History ==
Greager was born in Christchurch, New Zealand, where he received his first training as a singer.

He moved to Australia, where he successfully competed in several vocal competitions, including the Sun Aria contest. In 1972 he moved to London, where in 1975 he was accepted as junior principal at The Royal Opera, Covent Garden. He was principal tenor with the Scottish Opera and with the Hanover State Opera.

In 1980 he became a principal soloist with the Australian Opera (later Opera Australia), and played Edgardo in Lucia di Lammermoor, opposite Joan Sutherland, and opposite Jennifer McGregor in 1985.

He returned to New Zealand for several concert seasons. His Peter Grimes was praised

"Richard Greager's portrait of Grimes must be one of the finest of an illustrious career, beautifully catching the complexity of the tormented fisherman...powerfully lyrical in moments like the Great Bear and Pleiades aria, and wrenching in the final mad scene: one felt the expressive weight of every note of Britten's line" (William Dart Music in New Zealand of September 1995)

== Recognition ==
- He won the 2001 Australian Green Room Award for Best Supporting Male Singer in Wozzeck.
