= Paul Beard (violinist) =

English violinist

Beard when leader of the BBC Symphony Orchestra

Paul Beard (4 August 1901 – 22 April 1989) was an English violinist, known particularly as leader of Sir Thomas Beecham's original London Philharmonic Orchestra and Sir Adrian Boult's BBC Symphony Orchestra. He was also a teacher, holding posts at the Royal Academy of Music and the Guildhall School of Music.

== Life and career ==
Beard was born in Birmingham. He was taught by his father, a professional violist, and first played in public in 1907 at the age of six. He was educated at the Birmingham Oratory and St. Philip's Grammar School and when he was fourteen he won a scholarship to the Royal Academy of Music.

In 1920 Beard was appointed to lead the spa orchestra at Scarborough, and from 1922 to 1932 he was leader of the City of Birmingham Orchestra. When Sir Thomas Beecham established the London Philharmonic Orchestra in 1932, Beard was its first leader, remaining there until 1936, when he had the choice between offers to become concertmaster of the Boston Symphony Orchestra or leader of the BBC Symphony Orchestra. He chose the latter, attracted, he said, by the number and quality of the conductors and soloists with whom he would be working, and also by the very broad repertoire of the BBC orchestra. Arturo Toscanini, who was a guest conductor of the orchestra between 1935 and 1939, acknowledged Beard as the greatest orchestral leader he had met. Boult shared Toscanini's view, and said that he knew of no conductor who did not also do so.

Beard remained with the BBC Symphony Orchestra until his retirement in 1962, having been awarded an OBE in 1952.In 1953 he was selected by Sir Adrian Boult to lead the orchestra for the Coronation of Elizabeth II. He taught at the Royal Academy of Music, the Royal College of Music (from 1936 to 1940) and the Guildhall School of Music. He was made a Fellow of the Royal Academy of Music (FRAM) in 1939. He died in Epsom.

In 1925 Beard married Joyce Cass-Smith, who predeceased him. They had a son and a daughter.

An uncle, Frederic Beard (c. 1865 – 5 May 1912), was a choirmaster and organist in Birmingham, then in 1906 moved to Melbourne, Victoria, where he had a profound influence on choral performance. He died of appendicitis in Colombo while returning to Australia after a European holiday.
