= Screen Forever =

SCREEN FOREVER, formerly SPAA Conference, is an annual three-day conference for film industry professionals held in Australia by Screen Producers Australia.

== Description ==
Screen Producers Australia (SPA) is a national organisation that unites the screen industry to campaign for a healthy commercial environment. Screen Producers Australia supports the interests of businesses in their production of feature films, television programs, interactive content, and games across all genres and formats.

The conference, originally known as the SPAA Conference (when SPA was called the Screen Producers Association Australia), has been held in Sydney since 2009, having been previously held on the Gold Coast, Queensland.

SCREEN FOREVER is an annual three-day event organised by Screen Producers Australia. It is Australia's leading media and entertainment conference and the largest congregation of content creators, producers or anyone working in the screen industry. The program offers a mix of interviews, pitching opportunities, panel discussions, workshops, and social events with opportunities for business development and networking.

The Hector Crawford Memorial Lecture is given at Screen Forever. "The lecture has been a keynote feature of the annual conference since 1992. It honours its namesake's legacy and emphasises the importance of independent production in Australia's cultural life".

=== 2011 Conference ===
The 26th annual SPAA Conference was held at the Hilton in Sydney from 13 to 16 November 2011.

=== 2010 Conference ===
The 25th annual SPAA Conference was held at the Hilton in Sydney from 16 to 19 November 2010.

=== 2009 Conference ===
The 24th annual SPAA Conference was held at the Westin Hotel in Sydney from 17 to 20 November 2009.

=== 2008 Conference ===
The 23rd annual SPAA Conference was held at the Sheraton Mirage at the Gold Coast from 12 to 14 November 2008.

== SPAA conference speakers ==
Previous keynote speakers have included:

- Beau Willimon – House of Cards
- George Lucas – Star Wars
- Matthew Weiner – Mad Men
- Sydney Pollack – The Talented Mr. Ripley, The Quiet American, Cold Mountain
- Robert Towne – Mission: Impossible, Days of Thunder, The Firm
- Gareth Neame – Downton Abbey
- Saul Zaentz – The English Patient, Amadeus, One Flew Over the Cuckoo's Nest
- Eric Fellner – Fargo, Bridget Jones's Diary, Notting Hill, The Big Lebowski
- David Puttnam – The Mission, The Killing Fields, Midnight Express
- Jon Plowman – Absolutely Fabulous, The Office, The Vicar of Dibley
- Mike Reiss – Producer and writer, The Simpsons
- René Balcer – Law & Order, Law & Order: Criminal Intent
- Cathy Schulman – Producer, Crash, The Station Agent

== SPAA Fringe ==
SPAA Fringe was an annual two-day film television and new media event aimed at emerging producers presented until 2012 by the Screen Producers Association of Australia (SPAA).
