= Screen Producers Australia =

Organisation representing film production

Screen Producers Australia (SPA), formerly the Screen Producers' Association of Australia (SPAA) and earlier names, is a national organisation representing film production businesses, emerging producers, service providers and screen industry supporters. It campaigns for a healthy commercial environment for the Australian film industry. It also organises and hosts the annual SCREEN FOREVER conference for film industry professionals, and the Screen Producers Australia Awards, also known as the SPA Awards.

== History ==
In 1956, independent producers united to lobby federal and state governments to support Australian content on television and in the cinema, using both regulation and subsidies. A secondary goal was to increase their bargaining power in industrial relations negotiations with trade unions representing actors and technicians. In the late 1950s, the Australian Film Producers Association (AFPA)was created, mostly consisting of producers of advertisements, who lobbied against the importation of television advertising. For the next ten years, they lobbied to ensure higher levels of Australian content on commercial television.

AFPA became the Film Production Association of Australia (FPAA), registered in 1972 as an employer association. The Media, Entertainment and Arts Alliance (MEAA) and the producers' association have sometimes joined forces (such as lobbying for the protection of Australian industry and content), and sometimes clashed (such as with regard to the use of foreign actors in Australian films). Governments started funding some Australian feature films during the 1970s, leading to the founding of the Independent Feature Film Producers Association (IFPA) in 1973. Difficulties in negotiating agreements with Actors’ Equity led to a merger of IFPA and FPAA in 1976, forming the Film and Television Production Association of Australia (FTPAA).

In 1985, the FTPAA rebranded as the Screen Production Association of Australia (SPAA), and held the inaugural SPAA Conference, with the aim of increasing membership and funds. In 1994, the name changed to Screen Producers' Association of Australia (SPAA).

In November 2013, it rebranded as Screen Producers Australia.

In 2023 the Australian film industry was affected by the SAG-AFTRA strike in the United States. In July 2023 SPA announced that wholly local film and TV productions, even those engaging members of the Screen Actors Guild, could continue. It stated that a limited number of scripted offshore productions would be affected by the strike. Cast and crew working on series and films funded from the US would be stood down during the strike, but Australian-scripted productions using Australian and SAG members would not be affected by the strike order "if they were engaged under Australian industry contracts agreed to by SAG-AFTRA and the MEAA". SPA supported the strike, but said that its members would not be supported if they withheld their labour. In November, SPA expected a negative effect on foreign productions shot in Australia.

== Description ==
Screen Producers Australia supports the interests of businesses in their production of feature films, television programs, interactive content, and games across all genres and formats. Since its origins in the 1950s, the organisation has provided a consistent voice lobbying for Australian content regulation. Today its focus remains on advocacy, as well as industrial relations, and conferences and other events, such as SCREEN FOREVER and the Screen Producers Australia Awards.

SPA is a member of the International Federation of Film Producers Associations (FIAPF).

== See also ==
- Screen Forever (conference)
