= Melbourne Sun Aria =

Annual opera singing competition in Australia

The Herald Sun Aria, formerly known as The Sun Aria (because it was sponsored by The Sun News-Pictorial) is a vocal competition for emerging opera singers held in Victoria, Australia, each year. The competition offers nearly $60,000 in cash prizes.

The competition forms the aria section of the Royal South Street Eisteddfod, Australia's oldest and largest eisteddfod.

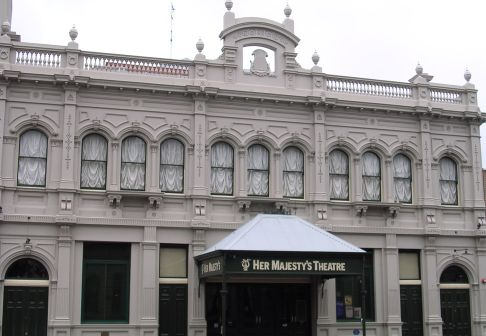
Her Majesty's Theatre, Ballarat, where the competition is held

Three of the most famous winners of the Aria competition are Wagnerian soprano Marjorie Lawrence (1928) and Dames Malvina Major (1964) and Kiri Te Kanawa in 1965. Others include June Bronhill (1950), Jonathan Summers (1973), Judith Henley (1976), Suzanne Ward (1984), Linda Thompson (1990), Rachelle Durkin (2000), and Nicole Car (2007).

The heats of the competition are held annually in August at Her Majesty's Theatre, Ballarat, and the final is held at the Melbourne Recital Centre in October (previously it was held at Hamer Hall in the Arts Centre Melbourne in early November).

Contestants, who are aged 32 years or under, are required to submit four aria titles from grand opera prior to the competition, and choose one of these to sing in the heat.

Sixteen semi-finalists are selected from those singing in the heats to appear on the evening following the second heat, again at Her Majesty's Theatre and sing another aria, this time chosen from their list by the panel of adjudicators.

Six finalists are then chosen to compete in the final at the Melbourne Recital Centre.

== Other Sun Arias ==
=== Sun Aria (Geelong) ===
'Comunn-na-Feinne is a Scots Gaelic association, founded in Geelong in 1856 The Sun-Pictorial sponsored an Aria Prize in conjunction with Geelong's festival in 1925 and subsequently. The last contest was in 1933. Notable winners include Marjorie Lawrence in 1928.

=== Sun Aria (Bendigo) ===
The newspaper offered similar prizes for the Bendigo musical, literary, and elocutionary competitions held in May 1925 and every year thereafter to 1936. Results 1925–1930 have not been found.

=== Sun Aria (City of Sydney) ===
The newspaper offered two prizes each year from 1933 to 1941, there was none held 1942–1945 and a single prize thereafter. It became a section of the Sydney Eisteddfod in 1949. Notable prizewinners include Joan Sutherland in 1949 and June Gough, better known as June Bronhill, in 1950.

== See also ==
- List of Sun Aria winners
- Shell Aria, a similar contest
- South Street Society, historically important
- Mobil Quest
