= Mobil Quest =

The Mobil Quest was an Australian competition for operatic vocalists which ran from 1949 to 1957, sponsored by the Vacuum Oil Company and broadcast by Melbourne radio station 3DB and relayed to affiliates throughout Australia. It is remembered with wry amusement for judging Ronal Jackson the 1949 winner ahead of Joan Sutherland.

== History ==
The quest was founded in 1949 with the stated aim of "bringing to the attention of the public the best vocal talent available in the Commonwealth" The Vacuum Oil Company had an honorable association with classical music in Australia, having supported Opera for the People concerts and broadcasts since 1946.

The contest was run Australia-wide, with contestants first passing an audition conducted by a participating radio station, which then conducted a series of heats to select that station's candidates for the semi-finals. Eighteen winners, three from each State, then competed in Melbourne to select the six who competed for the £1,000 prize at a grand final at the Melbourne Town Hall. The heats were broadcast in the relevant State capitals, and the finals broadcast through all participating stations. Lesser prizes for finalists were, respectively, £300, £100, £50, £25, and £15, later £300, £150, and £50 each for the other three finalists. (Note: To give some idea of the value of the prizes, a skilled worker's weekly wage at the time might have been £20, a new car £1000, and a house £5000.) Each singer who appeared on air received a broadcasting fee and all semi-finalists received an all-expenses trip to Melbourne.

The Mobil Quest radio broadcasts between 1949 and 1956, and the 1957 semifinals, are held in Australia's National Film and Sound Archive.

== Winners ==
Year	Winner	2nd	3rd	Equal 3rd
1949	Ronal Jackson	Trudy Daunt	William Smith	
1950	Joan Sutherland	David Allen	William Smith	
1951	Margaret Nisbett	Clifford Powell	June Bronhill	
1952	Donald Smith	Eric Mitchelson	Elizabeth Allen	Marjorie Conley
1953	Elizabeth Allen	Robert Allman	Raymond McDonald	
1954	Ronald Austron	John Shaw	Raymond McDonald	
1955	Marjorie Conley	Margreta Elkins	Heather Begg	Conrad Berensen
1956	Noel Melville	Heather Begg	Lance Lloyd	
1957	Nance Grant	Robert Bickerstaff	Richard Bromley	Peter Campbell

== Heats and finals ==
Year	Queensland	New South Wales	Victoria	Tasmania	South Australia and Northern Territory	West Australia	unknown
1949							
1950							
1951	Ernest Knight	Betty Prentice	Joan Aird				Eric Mitchelson, Maureen Boyce, Loris Sutton, Edwin Liddle
1952	Ernest Knight	Audrey Worrad	Dorothea Deegan				
1953							
1954			Valerie Collins	Dorothy O'Donahoo		Molly McGurk	Lance Ingram, Neil Warren-Smith, Edwin Liddle, Ronald Neill
1955							
1956							
1957							

== Musicians (finals and recital tours) ==
Year	Conductor	Orchestra	Pianist	Compere
1949		Australian Symphony Orchestra	Christine Whyte	
1950			Christine Whyte	
1951	Hector Crawford	Australian Symphony Orchestra	Christine Whyte	John Curtis
1952	Hector Crawford	Australian Symphony Orchestra	Henri Penn	
1953			Margaret Schofield	
1954			Marie van Hove	
1955				
1956				
1957				

== See also ==
- Shell Aria contest
- Melbourne Sun Aria
- South Street Society
