= W. D. Hill =

William Duguid Hill (7 January 1858 – 14 November 1921), generally referred to as W. D. Hill, was a citizen of Ballarat, Victoria; organiser of South Street Society competitions and longtime city councillor, serving as mayor for three terms, the last of which was notable for bringing together two rival councils.

== History ==
Hill was born in Magpie, Victoria, son of Archibald Hill (c. 1808 – 10 February 1868), a native of Glasgow, and proprietor of the East End Bakery, and Robina (Note: Spelled "Robine" in documents, but "Robina" elsewhere, no doubt as a pronunciation guide.) Hill (died November 1891), née Somerville. Mrs Hill was proprietor of Hill's Hotel, previously Carriers Arms Hotel, Skipton Street, Ballarat. He attended Redan Primary School, but left at an early age, perhaps to assist his widowed mother. At some stage he was working for McCartney and Co., coachbuilders, also taking night classes at the Central State School. He later became an auctioneer in partnership with George Wicks, as Wicks and Hill, from April 1883 to November 1883, when the partnership was dissolved and Hill took control of the business. He was later in partnership with W. L. Paine at the Federal Auction Mart, 5 Armstrong Street, also referred to as Dana Street, then from 1898 to his last days with James M. Grose at City Auction Rooms, Armstrong Street, though not actively involved in later years, having relinquished much of the business to L. A. Blackman.

=== Arts ===
As a young man, Hill was attracted to the literary society movement as a means of personal development, and joined the Skipton Street Debating Society, which met at the Societies' Hall, on Skipton Street. Then Hill, with other night-school students, founded the South Street Society, meeting at his mother's hotel on nearby South Street. Literary and public speaking contests developed alongside the debating "jousts", and contests were arranged with other clubs in the area. The South Street club, with Hill as secretary and guiding light, proved unbeatable, and other clubs failed to thrive, their more enthusiastic members joining South Street. The contests broadened in scope, and entrants from other towns were attracted to Ballarat. Their next bold move, organised by Hill, was erection of the club's own hall on Skipton Street, but bearing the sign "South Street Society". The club's finances were modest, but within a few years most of the bank loan had been repaid, and the contests by 1891 had become South Street Literary and Musical Competitions. The local member, later Prime Minister, Alfred Deakin and the Governor of Victoria, Lord Hopetoun, became loyal supporters, and "South Street" became one of the nation's foremost showcase of the performing arts. The Club hall became the Athenaeum, and when that building proved inadequate, he was behind the Coliseum.

=== Civic ===
In June 1905 Hill was elected unopposed to the Ballarat City council (as opposed to the Town (of Ballarat East), which council ran in parallel) for the South Ward. The following year his candidature was opposed by John Eva for the Labor faction, but Hill's friends and supporters were many, and he was elected with a substantial majority and unopposed thereafter. In 1909 he was elected mayor of Ballarat City by his fellow-councillors in a departure from the rotation system which had obtained for 25 years. The mayoral allowance at the time was £400. He was elected mayor again in 1916 and once more in 1920. At the same meeting, the success was announced of a plebiscite, agreeing to the amalgamation of the two councils. A few kilometres to the east, J. A. Pittard was elected mayor of the rival council. On 25 May 1921 a joint meeting of the two councils was held, chaired by Pittard, at which Hill was unanimously elected mayor of the new council.

=== Other activities ===
Apart from his business interests, and youthful interest in self improvement which led to the Skipton Street Debating Society and the South Street Society, followed by 16 years as a councillor and three terms as mayor, he was also:

- a member of the Water Board, and several terms as a water commissioner
- Justice of the Peace in 1912, sworn in by his old friend Sir John Madden (Note: Not to be confused with the unfortunate miner of the same name, for whom a house was purchased at 107 South Street.)
- president of the Orphanage committee
- briefly represented the district municipalities on the Health Board
- a member of the School of Mines Council
- a member of the High School Board
- for 14 years secretary of the old Ballarat Liedertafel
- for 20 years secretary of the board of St Andrew's Kirk
- founded Ballarat's Tourists' Bureau.
- hon. secretary of the Queen Carnival, held in 1916
- president of the Ballarat Fish Acclimatisation Society
- member of the Caledonian Society for many years
- secretary of the Agricultural and Pastoral Society, in conjunction with Lyle Blackman, M.C.

== Recognition ==
In 1917, towards the end of his second term as mayor, a public subscription was called to express the town's regard for him, an unusual honour for a living citizen.

In 1906 Thomas Price (11 January 1834 – 1 March 1916), (Note: A biography of Price at one time supplied by DAAO was dismissive of his achievements, instancing his technique of painting in oils over photographic portraits by William Bradley, who had a studio at 140 Pitt Street, Sydney. The (since redacted) DAAO biography of Price cites James Oddie as their sponsor and, incidentally, a founder of the Ballarat Fine Art Gallery. A later version is less detailed.) of the South Street Society, was commissioned to paint a portrait of Hill for the Ballarat Fine Art Gallery.

== Family ==
On 13 November 1895 Hill married Katherine Elizabeth Bloore; they had two daughters:

- Elsie Hill
- Daisy Hill

They had a home at 905 Skipton Street (corner of Skipton and Rubicon streets), Ballarat.

His siblings include

- Robina Hill (c. 1850 – 1 July 1933)
- Archie Hill ( – )
- John Hill ( – )
- Eliza Jane "Elsie Jane" Hill (c. 1859 – 27 July 1921)

== A tribute ==
"South Street" is known throughout Australasia and overseas because of his purposeful life and labors. Living quietly and unostentatiously, seeking neither fame nor monetary rewards, Cr Hill has done more to develop public interest in the liberal arts than any group of citizens who could be mentioned. It is but bare justice to his services to say that his native city has benefited incalculably by his inspirations, his industry, his optimism, and his unwearying public-spiritedtness. No Ballarat citizen is more widely known — none was ever more modest and unassuming. Three times Mayor, the first to preside over united Ballarat, an active worker in every public institution, energetic in pursuit of charitable movements, he has a most enviable record of good citizenship. — R.E.W.
