= John Lanigan (tenor) =

Australian opera singer (1921–1996)

Lanigan as Rodolfo in La bohème

John Lanigan (7 January 1921 – 1 August 1996) was an operatic tenor. Born in Australia, he studied singing in Italy and made a 30-year career at the Royal Opera, Covent Garden, London from 1951 to 1981. He sang more than 80 roles for the Covent Garden company. In his early years he played leading lyric tenor roles, and later became known for his performances in character parts. He created roles in new operas by, among others, Britten, Tippett, Davies and Henze.

== Life and career ==
Lanigan was born in Seddon, Victoria, Australia. His father was a keen amateur tenor and his mother was a professional singer, a member of J. C. Williamson's Gilbert and Sullivan company under the name Lucy Colahan. Lanigan studied with Horace Stevens at the Melbourne Conservatorium of Music. He served in the Royal Australian Corps of Signals during the Second World War, and while still in the armed forces he competed in the Melbourne Sun Aria competition, which he won in 1945. After demobilisation the following year he moved to Europe to study further, first in Milan, and later in London with Dino Borgioli. He made his professional debut in 1949 with the New London Opera Company at the Stoll Theatre, singing Fenton in Falstaff, and Rodolfo in La bohème.

Lanigan appeared in a touring production of The Desert Song in 1950, in the dual lead roles of The Red Shadow and Pierre. In 1951 he made his debut with the Covent Garden Opera Company, first in Liverpool and then at the Royal Opera House as Thaddeus in The Bohemian Girl, conducted by Sir Thomas Beecham. At that time there was a resident company at Covent Garden, of which Lanigan became a long-serving member. At first he played leading lyric tenor roles, including Rodolfo, Tamino in The Magic Flute, the Duke in Rigoletto, and Pinkerton to Victoria de los Ángeles's Cio-Cio-san in Madame Butterfly,

Lanigan declined to pursue an international career. Family life and a liking for being part of a regular team led him to remain based at Covent Garden, where he sang more the 80 roles between 1951 and 1981. From the outset he had played character roles as well as what he called "the young lover parts"; the former included the Rector in Peter Grimes, Don Basilio in The Marriage of Figaro and Flute in A Midsummer Night's Dream. Among his later character parts were Mime in Das Rheingold opposite the Alberich of Gustav Neidlinger and Shuisky in Boris Godunov. He created roles in new operas including Jack in The Midsummer Marriage (1955), Hermes in King Priam (1962), the Cardinal in Taverner (1972) and the Soldier/Madman in We Come to the River (1976).

Lanigan gave his last performance at the Royal Opera House in June 1981, as the Rector in Peter Grimes. After retirement he moved to Canada. He died on 1 August 1996, aged 75, survived by a widow and a son.

== Recordings ==
Lanigan recorded the roles of Pinkerton in Madame Butterfly with de los Ángeles and Geraint Evans; Cassio in Otello; Shuisky in Boris Godunov, opposite Boris Christoff's Boris; Jack in The Midsummer Marriage, Dr Caius in Georg Solti's first recording of Falstaff opposite Evans's Falstaff; the innkeeper in Benvenuto Cellini, and Gastone in La traviata, conducted by Carlo Maria Giulini. He recorded the role of the Rector in Peter Grimes twice: first in the 1959 set conducted by the composer, and in a 1978 recording conducted by Colin Davis. In the non-operatic repertoire he sang in Leopold Stokowski's 1961 recording of Schoenberg's Gurre-Lieder.
