= Ballarat Welsh Eisteddfods =

The Welsh Eisteddfods of Ballarat was a series of traditional eisteddfodau founded by Welsh miners at Ballarat in the gold rush days and revived in the early 20th century by some of their descendants.

== History ==
Eisteddfods, the Welsh festival of music and singing, poetry and recitation, were held by Welsh miners at Castlemaine, Victoria, with its nearby goldfields of Mount Alexander and Forest Creek, on Christmas Day 1854. Those at Ballarat began on St David's Day, 1 March 1855. Robert Lewis, Harry Davies, Jenkin Lewis, Isaac Davies, David Davies, Ellis Richards, William Price, Evan Jenkins (died 1900), Ellis Richards, and John Humffray were named as its organisers. Its successors were:

- 25 December 1858 at the United Presbyterian Church, Armstrong Street
- 25 December 1859 at the United Presbyterian Church, Armstrong Street
- 25–26 December 1863 at the Mechanics' Institute, organised by Robert Lewis, Harry Davies, and Theophilus Williams, later mayor of Ballarat East' The Sebastopol choir beat Forest Creek for the "Prize Glee";
- 25 December 1865 at the Charlie Napier's hall and 26 December 1865 at the Mechanics' Institute.
- 25–26 December 1866 at St George's Hall, organised by David Thomas. The two Cambrian Societies merged that year.
- 25 December 1867 at Theatre Royal and 26 December at the Mechanics' Institute.
- 25–26 December 1868
- 25–26 December 1869 at the Alfred Hall and Mechanics' Institute
- 1 March 1875 at the Mechanics' Institute
- 1 March 1876 at the Mechanics' Institute
- 1 March 1877
- 28 February 1879 at the Mechanics' Institute
- 1 March 1880
- 1 March 1881 at the Academy of Music
- 28 February and 1 March 1883 at Mechanics Institute, followed by a concert at the Academy of Music on 2 March.
- 1 March 1882 at the Alfred Hall
- 1 March 1883 at the Mechanics' Institute.
- 27–28 February 1884 at the Mechanics' Institute.
- 26–27 February 1885 at the Academy of Music
- 25–26 February 1886 at the Academy of Music
- 3–4 March 1887
- 25,26 December 1889 Academy of Music / Alfred Hall, with concert each evening.

(None held 1888, 1890, 1891)

- 15,16,18 April 1892 (Easter holiday) at the Alfred Hall: competitions during the day and concerts by the day's winners in the evening.

This appears to have been the last of the old-time eisteddfau, organised and performed by Welsh families for an audience of their own nationality, to be held in Ballarat to celebrate either Christmas or St David's Day.

In 1902 the South Street Society adopted the name "Eisteddfod" for their long-running and highly successful competitions, and that may have spurred some descendants of Welsh miners in the old mining town of Sebastopol (now an outer suburb of Ballarat) to reclaim the tradition.

In 1906 a Cambrian (ie Welsh) Society was formed at Sebastopol by Steve T. Jones (died 1906) and Nicholas Howell (died 1922) In 1907 they held their first musical and elocutionary competitions, held around St David's Day at the Sebastopol Town Hall. The competitions continued to 1926, when their 20th annual eisteddfod was held over a week, and was reportedly a success, but appears to have been the last.
