= Geoffrey Chard =

Australian opera singer (1930–2026)

Geoffrey Chard AM
- Chard c. 1980
- Born: Geoffrey William Chard; 9 August 1930; Sydney, New South Wales, Australia
- Died: 6 October 2026 (aged 96)
- Occupation: Operatic baritone
- Organizations: National Opera of New South Wales; English National Opera; Opera Australia
- Spouses: Marjorie Margaret Conley (m. 1956; died 1959) Margaret Ficken (m. 1972)

Geoffrey William Chard (9 August 1930 – 6 October 2026) was an Australian operatic baritone. He was a founding member of the National Opera of New South Wales in 1951, performed in England from 1961, and joined the English National Opera in 1969. He returned to Australia in 1985, performing major roles with Opera Australia. He had a broad repertoire of 140 roles but is especially remembered for contemporary opera, creating 13 roles in new operas.

== Life and career ==
=== Early life in Australia ===
Chard was born in Sydney on 9 August 1930. He was raised in Sydney's southern suburbs and attended Canterbury Boys' High School, where he was a promising tennis player. At age 17, Chard was playing leading roles in amateur musical society shows in the Sydney suburb of Rockdale. He was studying accounting but conductor Eugene Goossens recommended that he pursue a career in music after hearing his performance in Rockdale in Puccini's Tosca; Chard was initially reluctant, wary of the social distance between the musical profession and his upbringing. He declined an initial invitation to appear in a national production of the operetta Song of Norway by Wright and Forrest, hoping for a more serious opportunity.

He accepted the chance to perform with the National Opera of New South Wales, becoming a founding member of the organisation in 1951. His first professional appearance in opera was in its inaugural season, as Le Dancaïre in Bizet's Carmen. He then performed several roles with Goossens, who told him that he was at age 21 the youngest person in the world to play the Verdi roles of Ford in Falstaff and Iago in Otello. In 1952, aged 22, he portrayed the title role in Mozart's Don Giovanni for New South Wales National Opera in Brisbane for a season, after understudying for John Brownlee for a performance in Sydney. In 1956, Chard appeared in Mozart's The Marriage of Figaro in the inaugural production of the Australian Elizabethan Trust Opera Company. He married soprano Marjorie Margaret Conley on 5 May 1956 at St Mark's Anglican Church, Darling Point, Sydney. His wife died from a brain haemorrhage in 1959, leaving him with their two-year-old son David.

=== England ===
Chard visited England in 1960 and 1961. He made his professional debut there in August 1961, appearing on the BBC's The Singing Years with Eric Robinson and portraying Count Di Luna in a summer touring production of Verdi’s Il trovatore with Welsh National Opera. He moved to England in 1962, arriving with his son during the "big freeze" that winter. After initial struggles to find a steady job, he eventually began performing with British opera companies including the Royal Opera House in London, the Glyndebourne Festival, Aldeburgh Festival and Edinburgh Festival. He remarried to Margaret Ficken in 1972.

He was a principal baritone with the English National Opera for 15 years, from 1969 to 1985, performing many major roles such as Pizarro in Beethoven's Fidelio, Scarpia in Puccini's Tosca, and Balstrode in Britten's Peter Grimes. He appeared in world premieres of operas such as in the title role of Malcolm Williamson's Lucky-Peter's Journey, David Blake's Toussaint and Iain Hamilton's Anna Karenina. He also created a role in Alun Hoddinott's television opera The Rajah's Diamond, in Phyllis Tate's The Ballad of Reading Gaol, which Hoddinott had commissioned for him, and roles in operas by Lennox Berkeley, Gillian Whitehead, Larry Sitsky, and Alan John. Chard's performance as Urbain Grandier in the 1973 English premiere of Penderecki's The Devils of Loudun at the London Coliseum was described as "among the most remarkable on our postwar operatic stage. The enormous vocal range and the comparably enormous range of movement and gesture were welded into [a] faultless whole". Chard also performed in the English premieres of Henze's Triple Bill, Ginastera's Bomarzo, Janáček's The Excursions of Mr. Brouček, Szymanowsky's King Roger, Shostakovich's The Nose, and Ligeti's Le Grand Macabre. He also appeared as Sergeant Meryll in the 1982 television production of The Yeomen of the Guard.

=== Return to Australia ===
Returning briefly to Australia in 1982, Chard appeared with the Lyric Opera of Queensland. After returning permanently to Australia in 1985 and settling in the Sydney suburb of Hunter's Hill, he performed many major roles with Opera Australia. Chard's roles also included Don Alfonso in Mozart's Così fan tutte, Rangoni in Mussorgsky's Boris Godunov, Nick Shadow in Stravinsky's The Rake's Progress, Paolo in Verdi's Simon Boccanegra, Tonio in Leoncavallo's Pagliacci, the title role in Puccini's Gianni Schicchi and the title role in Australian composer Richard Meale's Voss.

Chard's mobility was reduced after a car accident in 2000 in which he fractured his neck and back. In 2015, at the age of 84, he was the singer in a concert paying tribute to Australian baritone Peter Dawson at Mosman Art Gallery.

Chard died on 6 October 2026 at the age of 96.

== Recognition ==
In the 1988 Australia Day Honours, Chard was appointed a Member of the Order of Australia (AM) for service to opera.
