= Judith Henley =

Australian opera singer

Judith Henley is an Australian soprano opera singer.

== Biography ==
In 1981 she played Violetta in the Victorian State Opera's production of Verdi's La traviata, then reprised her role in the Australian Opera's production in December 1985, in Canberra.

She sang in the State Opera of South Australia performance of "H.M.S. Pinafore" (as Josephine) in March 1981.
