= June Bronhill =

Australian opera singer, actress, performer (1929–2005)

June Bronhill OBE
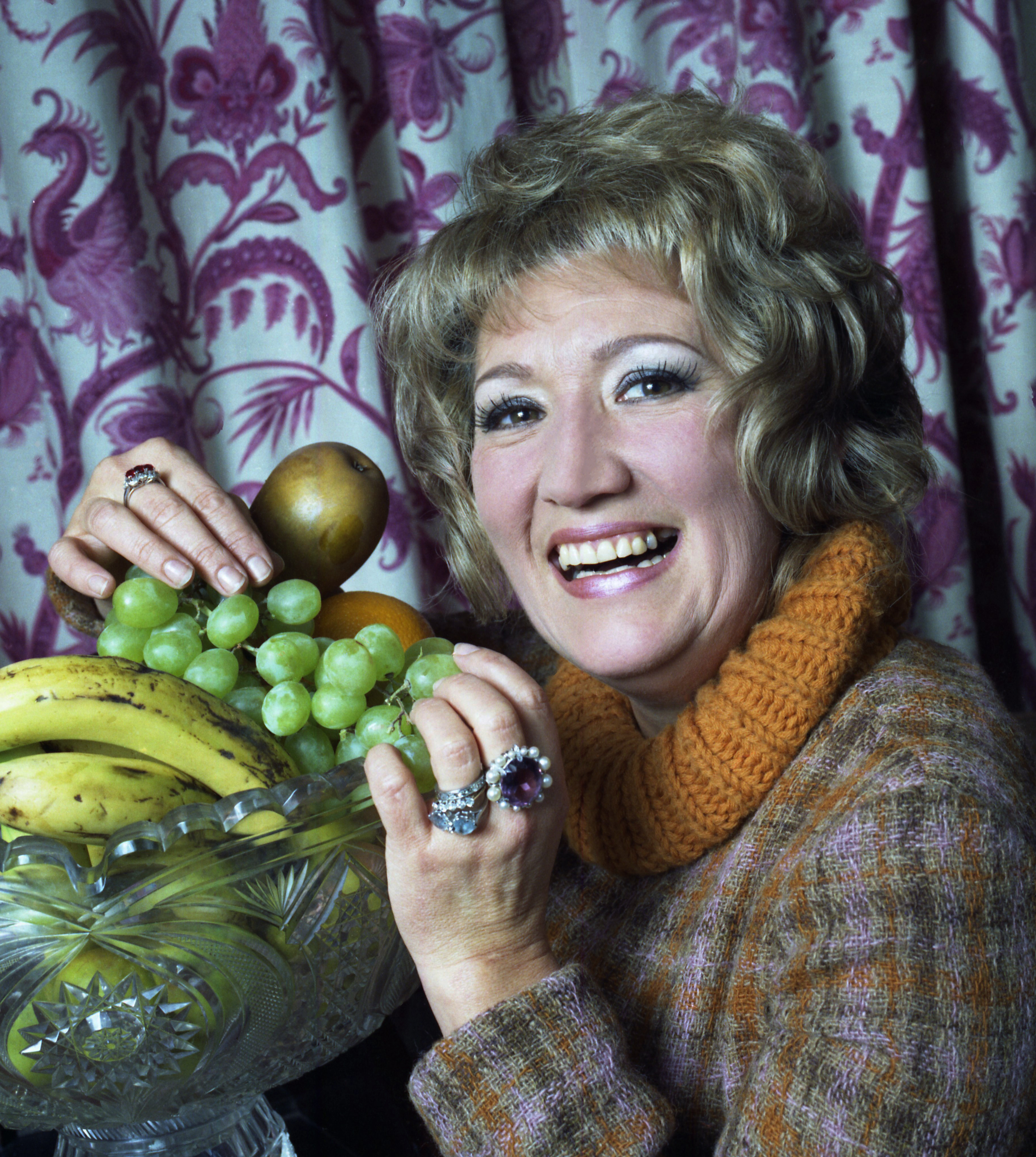
- Bronhill, photographed by Allan Warren, in 1973

Background information
- Born: June Mary Gough; 26 June 1929; Broken Hill, New South Wales, Australia
- Died: 24 January 2005 (aged 75) Sydney
- Occupations: Opera singer; actress; performer
- Years active: c. 1949–1993 (retirement)

June Mary Bronhill OBE (26 June 1929 – 24 January 2005), also known as June Gough, was an Australian coloratura soprano opera singer, performer and actress,

She was well known for light opera, operetta and musical theatre in London West End theatres and Australia as well as on the opera stage.

== Biography ==
Born as June Mary Gough in Broken Hill, New South Wales, in 1929, the daughter of George Francis Gough (1892–1963), born in Essex, England, and Mary Isobel Daisy Gough (1895–1964), née Hall,

She married twice, first Brian Martin at Marrickville, New South Wales, on 10 August 1951; and second, Richard Milburne Champion de Crespigny Finny (1925–2003), in Sydney, on 17 January 1963. Both marriages ended in divorce. She had a daughter, Carolyn Jane Finny, in May 1963 by her second marriage.

== Stage name ==
Like other noted Australian sopranos, such as Elsie Mary Fischer (1881–1945) ("Elsa Stralia"), Vera Honor Hempseed (1890–1952) ("Madame Vera Tasma", after Tasmania), Helen Porter Mitchell (1861–1931) ("Nellie Melba", after Melbourne), Dorothy Mabel Thomas (1896–1978) ("Dorothy Canberra"), Florence Ellen Towl (1870–1952) ("Madame Ballara", after Ballarat), and Florence Mary Wilson (1892–1968) ("Florence Austral"), June Mary Gough adopted the stage name "June Bronhill" (after Broken Hill), which was her way of thanking her home town for its support in raising money to send her overseas for professional training as a singer. Her European vocal teacher misheard "Broken Hill" as "Bro-n-hill".

== Career ==
She won third prize in the singing competition Sun Aria in 1949 and first prize in 1950. She used her prize money to fund a trip to London to further her studies.

In the 1951 Mobil Quest singing competition, June Bronhill was awarded third prize.

Bronhill trained in London and gained early exposure with the English National Opera (Sadler's Wells Opera) company in Mozart's The Marriage of Figaro. She also sang leading roles in Die Fledermaus, The Gypsy Baron, Menotti's The Telephone, Flotow's Martha and Hansel and Gretel. Her roles in Offenbach's operas, with the Sadler's Wells company, included Eurydice in Orpheus in the Underworld and Gabrielle in La Vie parisienne.

In 1961 and 1962, she appeared as Maria von Trapp in The Sound of Music on the Australian stage. In 1964 she appeared as Elizabeth Barrett Browning in the musical Robert and Elizabeth at the Lyric Theatre, London, alongside Keith Michell as Robert Browning, a show she took to Australia in 1966. She also appeared in England in tours of two Ivor Novello musicals, Glamorous Night and The Dancing Years, the latter playing a season at the Saville Theatre in London. She also appeared as the Mother Abbess in the 1981 London revival of Rodgers and Hammerstein's The Sound of Music at the Apollo Victoria Theatre.

Bronhill was perhaps best known for the title role of Hanna Glawari in Franz Lehár's The Merry Widow, with the Sadler's Wells Opera (now known as English National Opera), with Thomas Round as Danilo in 1958 and revised in 1960. She sang the role more than 200 times, capturing a faithful following.

Bronhill made frequent visits back to her homeland, singing in operas such as The Merry Widow, Orpheus in the Underworld, Die Fledermaus and Rigoletto at the Sydney Opera House in 1975. In 1976, she decided to move back to Australia permanently. In Australia she appeared in operas such as Die Entführung aus dem Serail and a Victoria State Opera production of Donizetti's Maria Stuarda in July 1976, directed by Robin Lovejoy with a cast including Nance Grant conducted by Richard Divall.

She played operetta roles such as Josephine (H.M.S. Pinafore), Phyllis (Iolanthe) and Ruth (The Pirates of Penzance). She also had roles in The Maid of the Mountains, Call Me Madam, A Little Night Music, Nunsense, My Fair Lady and How to Succeed in Business Without Really Trying as well as appearing in the non-musical plays Arsenic and Old Lace and Straight and Narrow.

Bronhill also appeared in the role of Mrs Crawford in the television comedy series Are You Being Served?, the Australian version of the British comedy series, as well as in Lipton Tea television advertisements singing an adaption of "Fugue for Tinhorns" from Guys and Dolls.

Bronhill was a patron of the Australian Girls Choir from the choir's beginning. There is a scholarship in her name, the June Bronhill Encouragement Scholarship, awarded each year to the chorister with the most choral prowess.

A portrait of Bronhill, painted by Andrew Sibley, was entered into the 1966 Archibald Prize.

Bronhill released her debut single, "The Lord's Prayer" in late 1979.

Her voice was characterised as a "very crystal clear, diamond bright coloratura soprano" with "absolutely impeccable diction". Opera News noted that "Bronhill's crisp, bright prettiness and crystalline diction made her an ideal exponent of operetta heroines".

== Death ==
Bronhill died on 24 January 2005, aged 75, in her sleep at a Sydney nursing home. Although she had beaten breast cancer in the 1980s, her later years were marred by deafness and social isolation, and she retired in 1993. Her home town, Broken Hill, honoured her by declaring a minute's silence during the 2005 Australia Day celebrations two days after her death. Mayor Ron Page noted, "She is very special to us; if you ask every householder in Broken Hill, they'll be able to say, yes, they are proud of June Bronhill." Then acting prime minister, John Anderson noted, "The world is mourning the loss of someone who entertained millions, but it's good to see the local community here recognise one of their own in ... a very proud community celebrating the life of one of their daughters."

== Autobiography ==
Bronhill's "frank and funny" autobiography, The Merry Bronhill, was published in 1987. EMI Australia produced a compilation album with the same title to publicise the book.

== Honours ==
Bronhill was made an Officer of the Order of the British Empire (OBE) in the 1976 New Year Honours, and was later given a Lifetime Achievement Award by the Australian Variety Club. In Broken Hill, a street and an auditorium are named after her.
