= South Street Society =

Australian debating society and competition organiser

The South Street Society was an organisation based in Ballarat, Victoria, which conducted a series of performing arts contests and concerts originally styled the "South Street Competitions", which developed into the "Grand National Eisteddfod", later the Royal South Street Eisteddfod, not to be confused with the Ballarat Welsh Eisteddfods.

The contests began as a public speaking and debating competition held by Ballarat's South Street Young Men's General Debating Society within its own membership, then between similar societies in the region. It expanded in range and scope into musical and calisthenic performances, drawing entries from all parts of Australasia. Much of its success can be attributed to its organising secretary, W. D. Hill. and his successor, L. A. Blackman.

Despite the contests' brief and peripheral association with the Ballarat location, "South Street" has remained part of its title for over 130 years.

== History ==
=== South Street Competitions ===
Ballarat theatre locations 1870–1890
(approx only, from descriptions)
1 Intersection, South and Skipton
2 Lyceum, Lyons Street North
3 Alfred Hall, Grenville & Curtis
4 Mechanics' Institute, Sturt Street
5 Academy of Music, Lydiard Street,
(later Her Majesty's Theatre)
6 Athenaeum, Grenville Street
7 Coliseum, Little Bridge Street
8 Charlie Napier Hotel, Main Road

The South Street Young Men's General Debating Society was founded on 10 July 1879 with seven members, all senior students of the Central State night school, at the residence of 21 year-old W. D Hill. Hill was elected president, and J. Menzies hon. secretary, and the Societies' Hall on the corner of South and Skipton streets adopted for their Friday meetings. (Note: This building (also known as the "Friendly Societies' Hall" and "Steet's Assembly Rooms" was on the South Street side of William Steet's (died 1888) Carriers' Arms Hotel at a corner of South and Skipton streets. The Carriers' Arms was licensed to, and (perhaps from 1888) owned by, Robina Hill (died 1891), mother of W. D. Hill.) In 1881 Hill became secretary, a position he held until the year he died. The Society grew rapidly, and in February 1883 met in Henry Oyston's new Lyceum hall in Lyons Street north.

Attempts were made to stimulate competition among similar clubs in the area, to which end the Ballarat M.I.A. Union (Note: For Mutual Improvement Association. This was an era of self-improvement, when young men vied for leadership opportunities by improving their social skills. Other M.I.A's in Ballarat (most associated with Protestant churches) were the Lidiard Street M.I.A., Scots Church M.I.A., Neil Street M.I.A., Peel street Elocution Club, St Paul's M.I.A.) was formed, holding literary competitions (mostly recitations) from 1880. but with the South Street club outclassing the rest in competitions and leadership, interest in the Union faltered.

In 1886 members of the club "read" Retribution, a play by member R. C. Molyneux, then performed it at the Academy of Music, to faint praise. With great faith in their future, the Society set about building their own hall on rented land close to the Societies' Hall. The Skipton Street Hall was officially opened in June 1886 by Alfred Deakin MLA. They produced plays, conducted fruit and flower exhibitions, bazaars and sideshows, ran a skating rink and other activities to help with their building fund. At the time of signing, they had £70 in the bank, yet within two years £700 of their £1,000 loan had been paid off. In 1890 the society unanimously decided to remove the bar to membership of Roman Catholics. The Loyal Orange Lodge admonished members W. D. Hill and Fred Barrow; they quit the Lodge in protest. The contest was renamed the South Street Literary and Musical Competitions in 1891, and expanded in scope each year: in 1892 there were 60 separate contests — debates, speeches, recitations, readings, and vocal and instrumental music, and a new category — cooking. At first entries were limited to citizens of the Ballarat district, then Victoria, finally in 1895 all of Australasia. The society was fortunate in the patronage of the Governor, Lord Hopetoun, who first presented the prizes in 1891; his continuing interest has been credited much of the society's success, also from Ballarat-born Deakin, a strong supporter from its early days, throughout his political career, including his time as prime minister. The huge task of organisation remained with the South Street Debating Society, with the burden of work borne by the secretary W. D. Hill, to universal acclaim. For the competitions of 1900, which were spread out over a month, two innovations were made — a brass band contest and an undeclared public holiday on the last Friday. As competition organisers, the word "Debating" was progressively dropped, and by 1901 they had become "South Street Society" in official pronouncements, and formally changed in 1908. A notable entrant for the 1901 debates was James Scullin, a recent arrival in Ballarat and new member of the society.

Controversially, they decided to bring out, from England, the eminent musician J. Ord Hume to adjudicate the 1902 band contests. Though expensive, it added legitimacy to the contests, and was later credited with raising the standard of Australian brass bands. Hume was generous with his praise, candid in his criticisms, and made a great number of concrete suggestions, all of which were gratefully received. He praised the rules drawn up for band competition by the Victorian Band Association, and thereafter maintained an interest in the South Street competitions.

It became evident that the existing facilities — their Skipton Street hall (seating 1,000), the Mechanics' Institute in Sturt Street, Her Majesty's Theatre (ex-Academy of Music, seating 1,277), and the Alfred Hall (built for the visit of Prince Alfred in 1867, and seating 3,000) provided insufficient accommodation for the society's ambitions, and another building program began — an allotment on the corner of Grenville and Little Bridge streets was purchased, and when the £2,000 needed for construction of the building could not be raised from government, it was raised locally.

In 1903 the South Street Society renamed their 13th annual competitions as the "Great National Eisteddfod of Australasia", or "Grand Eisteddfod of Australasia" with choral competitions 20, 21, and 23 October and band competitions 29, 30, and 31 October, at which both the newly installed Prime Minister Deakin and Governor-General Tennyson were guests. The Governor, Sir George Clarke, was then petitioned by the society to seek royal patronage for the competitions at his forthcoming audience with the King, in which case the competitions would be run as the Royal Ballarat Eisteddfod. At the next competitions, held in Ballarat from 27 September 1904 and billed as the "National Eisteddfod", the special guest was the new governor general, Lord Northcote. Prizes at the Eisteddfod of October 1905 were presented by the newly reinstated Prime Minister Deakin, who had a long history of supporting the Ballarat competitions. In 1906, as in the previous four Eisteddfods, a celebrity adjudicator was brought out from Britain; on this occasion it was the conductor Frederic Beard. The cost of bringing out these adjudicators was to some extent offset by their appearing at other contests and coaching sessions in Australia and New Zealand, but the arrangements involved were not made public. One of Professor Beard's decisions was controversial. In 1907 Prime Minister Deakin and Nellie Melba were present for the prizegiving ceremonies.

The Skipton Street hall was moved to their new property, facing Grenville Street, and in September 1908 renamed The Athenaeum. The 6,000-seat Coliseum (or New South Street Hall as some were calling it), was built next door, facing Little Bridge Street, and opened in September 1908 by Prime Minister Deakin.

The Coliseum debt was never paid off, mostly on account of Hill's promoting the contest to the detriment of other considerations, with generous prizes, a multitude of contests, importing British judges, and chartering trains from Melbourne to encourage tourism. With Hill's death, the Society started getting is financial affairs in order, and supported them with a great concert in July 1927 which netted £800 for the building fund.
In March 1936 the Coliseum, by this time a picture theatre, one of the largest in Australia, was burnt to the ground, and the Athenaeum badly damaged. Both buildings were owned by the South Street Society, whose records were protected by a brick wall. The Manchester Unity Hall, near the Athenaeum on Grenville Street, also suffered some damage. The Alfred Hall (designed by Henry Caselli, who was also responsible for the Grenville College building) was condemned as unsafe in 1939, due to risk of fire, but survived to 1957 when it was demolished, following completion of the Civic Hall.

- 1909 Prizemoney for the choral contests was criticised for being too generous, considering the only entrants were choirs from Ballarat.
- 1910 Adjudication of the brass bands was William Short, the King's Trumpeter.
- 1911 Tom Morgan judge at record brass band contest
- 1912 Alfred Gray was adjudicator at the band contests. At the council's October meeting, councillor Pearse moved that the annual grant of £100 to the Society be cancelled. As he was speaking to the motion, the Manly brass band from Sydney, recently disembarked from the train, paraded up the main street playing a lively tune. There was no seconder to the motion.
- 1913 Contest opened by Prime Minister Joseph Cook; a debriefing session with the elocution judge on church premises on Sunday was controversial.
- 1914 Two bands protested the win by Rozelle (a strong NSW band), due to its apparent late entry. W. D. Hill denied interfering with other organisations' plans for their own band competitions.
- 1915 Several New South Wales bands complained of having to compete under Victorian Band Association rules. Attempts to standardize failed due to parochial intransigence. There were threats of boycotting the Competitions.
- 1916 With great demands on their services due to the Great War, the Ballarat Hospital and Red Cross needed additional funds. South Street offered to conduct a Queens' Carnival, taking 20 per cent. for expenses and a contribution toward their building fund, viewed resentfully by many despite the universal admission that without South Street's involvement it would collect much less.
- 1922 W. D. Hill died and L. A. Blackman (Note: Lyle Aubrey Blackman MC (7 March 1890 – 1964), accountant, was son of William and Frances Blackman (née Crompton). He attended Miners Rest State School, Ballarat State School and Grenville College. Enlisted with First AIF in September 1914.) was elected secretary; he served continuously to 1956, when he took ill and the president, J. H. Davey took over.
- c. 1955 New Civic Hall opened

=== List of presidents ===
- 1879 W. D. Hill
- Jul 1881 Theo Saunders
- 1882 Cooper
- 1883 L. Pritchard
- 1884 James Ronaldson
- 1885 Theo Saunders
- Jan 1886 David A. Brown
- Jul 1886 Richard Maddern
- Jan 1887 Richard Maddern
- Jul 1887 Alfred Monod
- Jan 1888 Theo Saunders
- Aug 1888 Joseph Rowsell
- Jan 1889 Richard Maddern
- Jul 1889 F. Barrow
- Jan 1890 Alfred G. Lumsden
- Jul 1890 Theo Saunders
- Jan 1891 Richard Maddern
- Jul 1891 F. Barrow
- Jan 1892 F. Barrow
- Jul 1892 W. B. Radley
- Jan 1893 R. Llewelyn
- Jul 1893 Charles Speedy
- 1894 Theo Saunders
- Jan 1895 F. T. Smith
- Jul 1895 W. Coulthard
- 1896 Richard Maddern
- Jan 1898 John Meehan
- Jul 1898 F. Besemeres

Annual elections 1899–1905

- 1899 R. Maddern
- 1900 Frederick J. Williams
- 1901 Frank Besemeres (died 1928)
- 1902 F. J. Williams
- 1903 Frederick Sutton (died 1923)
- 1904 W. H. Gent
- 1905 Lieut-Col Williams
- Jan 1905 W. D. Thomas
- Jun 1905 W. Errey
- Jan 1906 F. Barrow
- Jul 1906 J. Porteous
- Oct 1906 W. H. Chandler (acting?)
- Jan 1907 J. Pascoe
- 1907 W. D. Thomas (died 1926)
- 1908 J. T. Morris
- 1908, 1909 Fred J. Williams
- 1910 J. T. Morris
- 1911 S. W. H. Pearson
- 1912 Robert J. Cooke, son of mayor David Cooke
- 1913 Robert J. Cooke
- 1914 F. J. Martell
- 1915 Frank Besemeres
- 1916 Frank Besemeres
- 1917 W. Ellsworth
- 1918 W. Ellsworth
- 1919 W. A. Stark
- 1920 W. Elsworth
- 1921 Robert H. Ramsay
- 1922 C. Lloyd Brind (and L. A. Blackman secretary)
- 1923 J. H. Davey
- 1924 S. W. H. Pearson
- 1925 S. W. H. Pearson
- 1926 W. W. Harris
- 1927
- 1928
- 1929 R. H. Ramsay
- 1930, 1932 James Harrison
- 1933, 1934 J. A. Wilkie
- 1935 Thomas H. Dammery
- 1937 A. W. Steane
- 1938 S. C. Henderson
- 1939, 1940 Robert H. Ramsay (mayor 1944)
- 1941 F. V. Middleton
- 1945, 1946 Roy Reed
- 1948 J. S. Gullan
- 1949, 1950 J. C. Rowe
- 1951
- 1956 J. H. Davey
