= Domenico Quaglio =

Domenico Quaglio is the name of:

- Domenico Quaglio the Elder (1723–1760), Italian painter
- Domenico Quaglio the Younger (1787–1837), Italian painter, son of Giuseppe Quaglio

== See also ==
- Quaglio
