= Giulio Quaglio =

Giulio Quaglio is the name of:

- Giulio Quaglio the Elder (1610–1658), Italian painter
- Giulio Quaglio the Younger (1668–1751), Italian painter and stage designer
- Giulio Quaglio III (1764–1801), Italian architect, stage designer and painter
