= Giulio Quaglio the Elder =

Italian painter

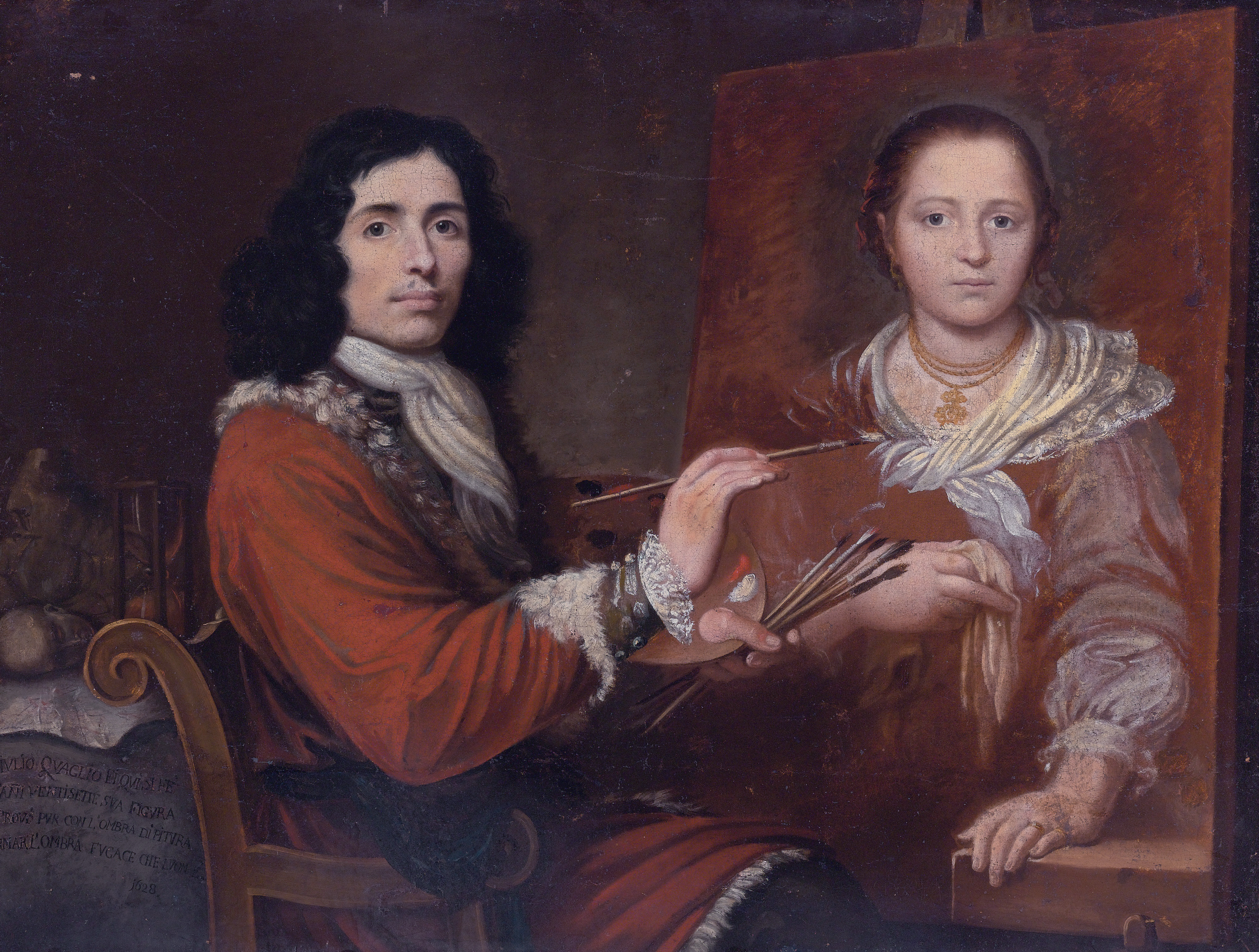
Self Portrait of the Artist Painting his Wife

Giulio Quaglio the Elder (1610–1658 or after) was an Italian painter of frescoes. He was a follower of Tintoretto. He is known to have worked in Vienna, Salzburg, and Ljubljana.

His son, Giulio Quaglio the Younger, was born in Laino and established himself in the Friuli about the end of the 17th century. Giulio the Younger, who died in 1720, is best known for his frescoes at the chapel of the Monte di Pietà, in Udine.

They are both part of a large family of artists and architects from the town of Laino, between Lake Lugano and Lake Como, and which included Giuseppe Quaglio and his sons Lorenzo the Younger, Simon, and Domenico; Lorenzo Quaglio the Elder; and Giovanni Maria Quaglio the Elder and his son.
