= Angelo Quaglio the Younger =

German-Italian painter (1829–1890)

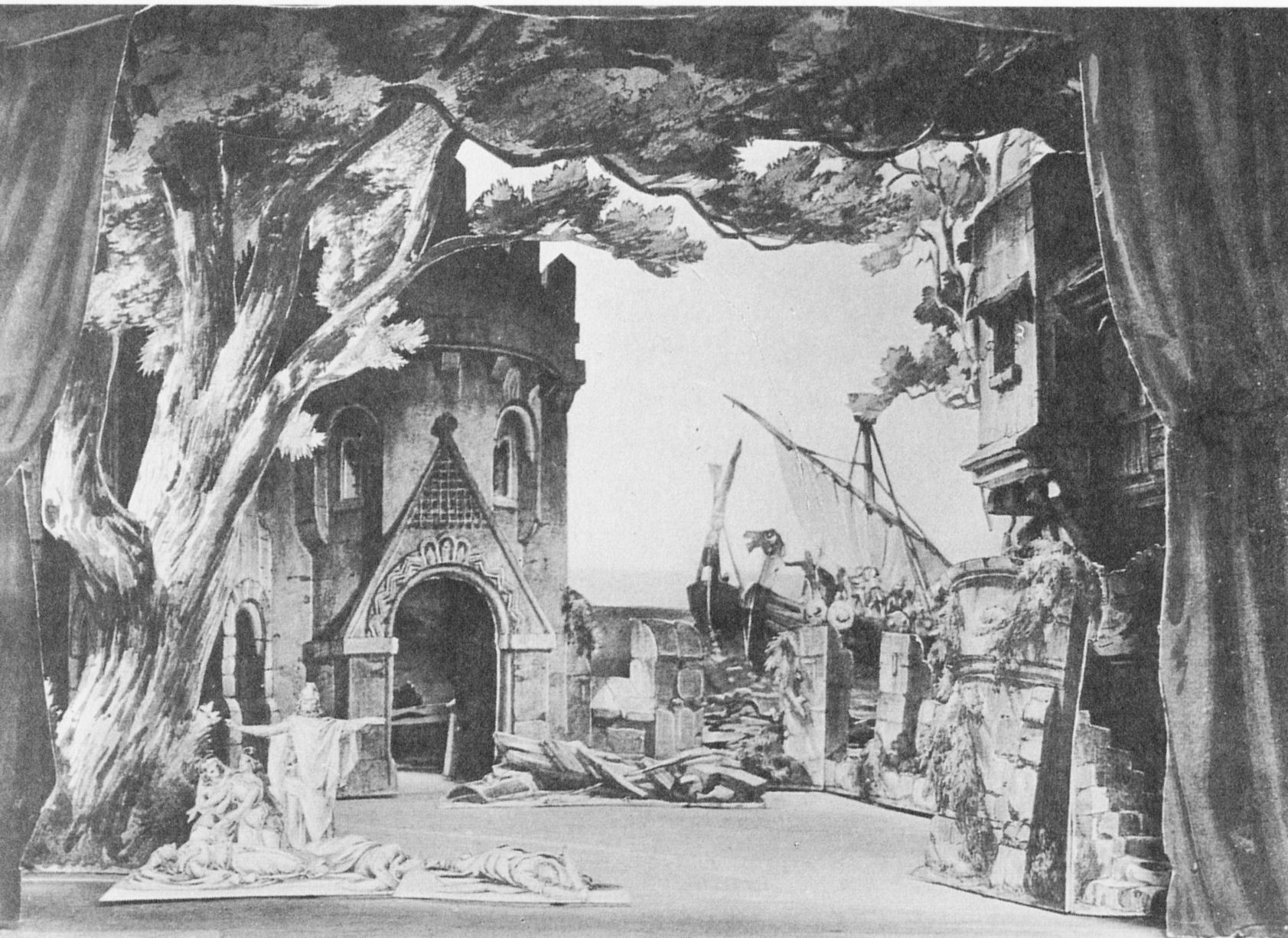
Set design for Tristan und Isolde by Richard Wagner

Angelo Quaglio the younger (13 December 1829, Munich - 5 January 1890, Munich) was a German stage designer of Italian descent. He worked mainly in Munich, and assisted Richard Wagner in the premieres of a number of his works.

Angelo was part of the Quaglio family originally from the town of Laino, between Lake Como and Lake Lugano. Simon Quaglio (1795–1878) was a German stage designer. He worked mainly in Munich and was among the first designers to use built scenery instead of painted flats. He designed over 100 productions during his career. Simon's father, Giuseppe Quaglio (1747–1828), practised scene painting in Mannheim, Frankfurt, and Ludwigsburg. Simon's brother, Angelo Quaglio the Elder (1778—1815) was an architect and painter. He designed and painted landscapes and architectural pictures for Sulpiz Boisserée's work on Cologne Cathedral.
