= Eugen Quaglio =

German stage designer

Eugen Quaglio (b Munich, 3 April 1857; d Berlin, 25 Sept 1942) was a German stage designer of Italian extraction. He worked mainly in Berlin and Prague.

== Heritage ==
Eugen came from a long line of stage designers:

- Giulio Quaglio (1668-1751).
- Domenico Quaglio (1708-1773)
- Giuseppe Quaglio (1747-1828)
- Simon Quaglio (1795-1878)
- Angelo Quaglio (1829-1890)

== Life ==
Eugen was the son of Angelo, who worked at the Munich court theatre beginning in 1850, and also managed a commercial scenic studio which supplied theatres in Dresden, Berlin, Stuttgart and St Petersburg. His designs were of an illusionistic historical style. Closely connected with the aesthetic ideas of Ludwig II of Bavaria, Quaglio was one of the principal designers for the Munich Wagner premières. He worked with his father and others.

Following in his footsteps, his son Eugen worked with him from about 1877. In 1891 he became court theatre painter in Berlin, a post he held until 1923. He carried on the family tradition of historical stage designs, above all in Wagner productions. Although he was influenced by naturalism and verismo, his romanticizing productions were basically historical idylls.

A few of his set designs have survived as art.
