= Michael Neher =

German painter

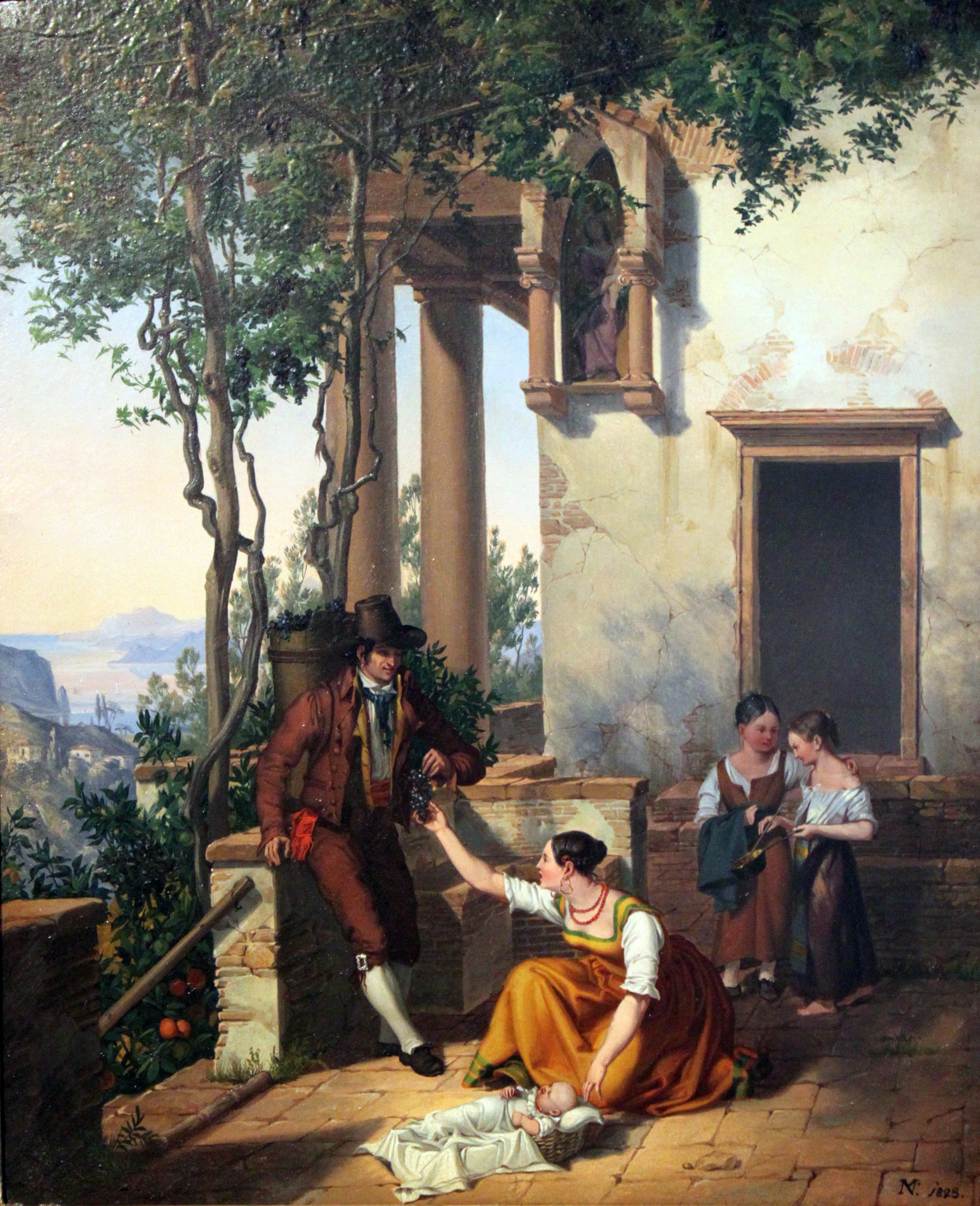
Scene from Italian Folk Life (1828)

Michael Neher (1798 at Munich – 1876 in Munich), the son of Joseph Neher, a citizen and painter of that city, but of a family from Biberach. Michael received a classical education, and was instructed in the rudiments of painting by Mitterer, and in 1813 entered the Academy at Munich. From 1816 to 1818 he studied under Matthias Klotz, and was then employed by Angelo Quaglio in his theatrical work. After having worked for some time as scene-painter at the Court Theatre, he went to Trento, Milan, and Trieste, and painted portraits. In 1819 he was encouraged by Hieronymus Hess, at Rome, to devote himself to genre painting. On his return to Munich in 1823 he became Conservator of the Art Union. In 1839 he painted several saloons in the Hohenschwangen Schloss, after sketches of Schwind, Gasner, and Schwanthaler. He, however, in 1837 devoted himself entirely to architectural painting, and travelled for improvement on the Rhine, and in Belgium. He was received an honorary member of the Academy at Munich in 1876, and died there in the same year.
