= Burgellern Castle =

Coordinates: 49.9878°N 11.0452°E

Burgellern Castle is a castle located in a village called “Burgellern” near Bamberg in Franconia, Germany. The former residence of Bamberg's cathedral chapter of the 18th century is today offering a Hotel and a Restaurant.

== History ==
The benediction of the castle's chapel in 1342 is the earliest source of information that relates to a medieval castle belonging to Konrad of Giech. Further information about owners of the manor or about physical alterations and redevelopment of the building are unknown and remain in the dark until the beginning of the 18th century.

1726 a letter written by the dean of the cathedral of Bamberg Marquard Wilhelm Count of Schönborn is documenting the rebuilding of Burgellern Castle as residence of the chapter. Several stays during the following years witness his preference for the castle.

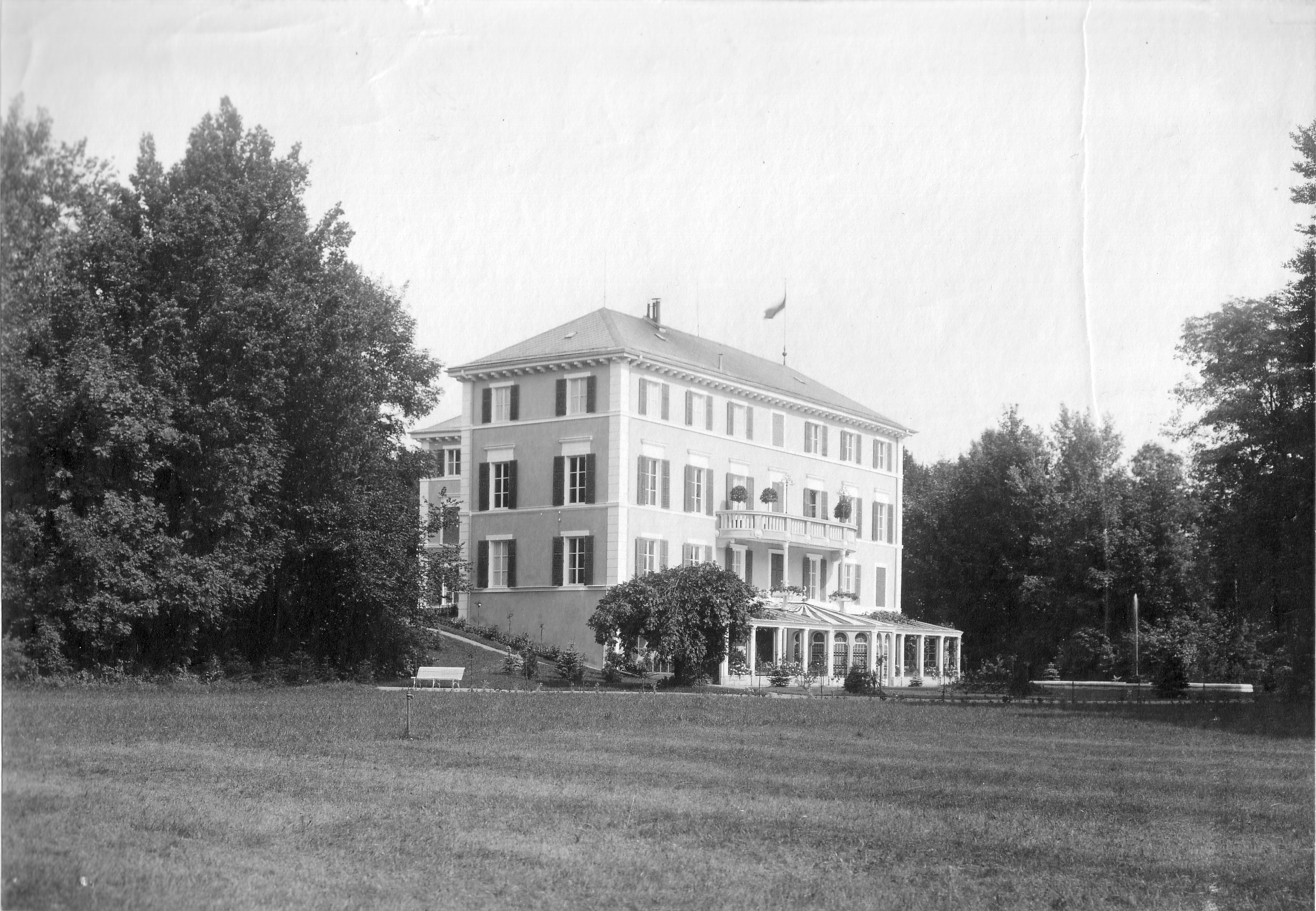
Burgellern Castle around 1900

His successor established the administration building of the chapter in the castle grounds in 1772. In November 1802 as a result of the secularisation the estate became Bavarian property. Eight years later on May 24, 1810, the estate was sold by the public administration of Bavaria to the royal merchant Seligmann Samuel Heßlein from Bamberg for the price of 38.025 guilder, who again alienated it to the brother of the last Prince – Bishop of Bamberg General-Lieutenant Leopold Baron of Buseck.

From 1821 on the castle was property of his sons Karl Theodor and Friedrich Carl of Buseck. During the time of their residence some important constructional modifications must have taken place. A lithography of Karl Theodor of Buseck, who was a painter, shows the baroque state of the double-winged structure in 1821. During the 19th century the tall mansard roof was replaced by a mezzanine and a low saddle roof. Afterwards there were classical alterations around the whole castle and in 1839 it received oriental decoration and furnishing inside. Due to a trip to the Orient of the Buseck Brothers and Duke Max in Bavaria in 1838, several parlours and salons were completely decorated with oriental mural and ceiling paintings and furniture. In this time the Bavarian nobles as well as King Maximilian of Bavaria who was friends with the Barons of Buseck, King Ludwig I. of Bavaria and Duke Max, met in Burgellern castle 1853.

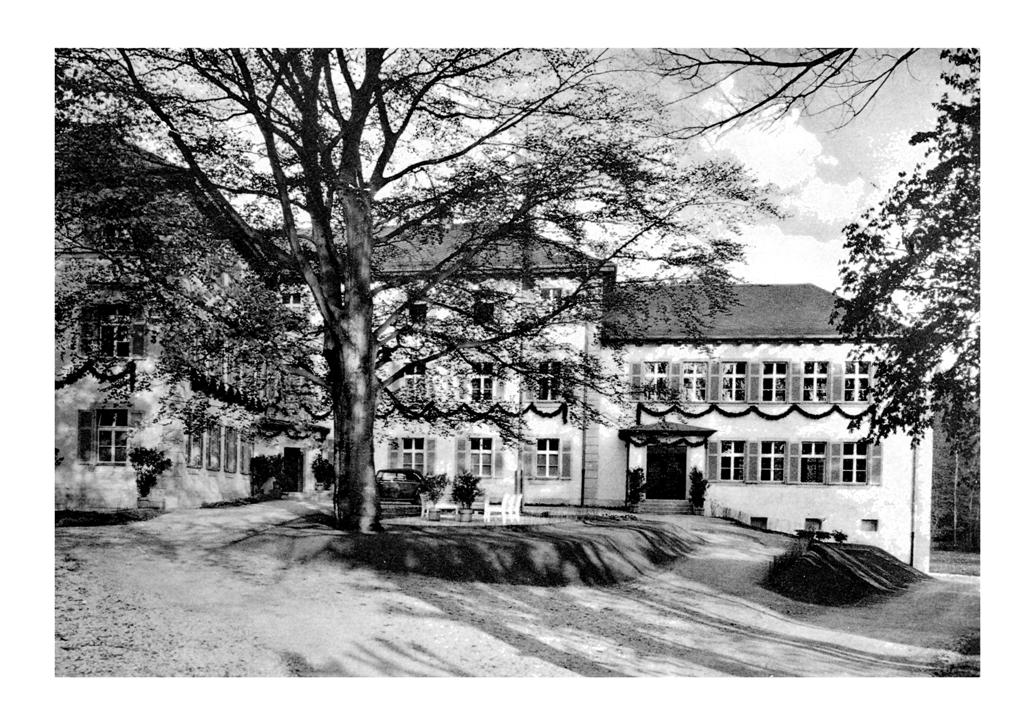
Burgellern Castle 1936, mother home

As the Buseck brothers died unmarried and childless in 1860 and 1866, the heritage was passed to the son of their sister Caroline of Thünefeld (née Buseck). Rudolf of Thünefeld moved to Burgellern in the years of 1880. He turned the administration building of the chapter into a carriage house and built a pump house located in the castle grounds in 1896. It was established in the style of a romantic small castle and had a serving function in running the fountain in the castle grounds. Rudolf of Thünefeld also died unmarried (April 12, 1906). The Buseck brothers and Rudolf of Thünefeld are buried in the funeral chapel of the baroque Katharina-Magdalena-Chapel in Burgellern. Afterwards the heritage was passed to the maternal related family of Bodeck who couldn’t hold the highly indebted estate. It was offered for sale piece by piece. A large part of the inventory was sold to the art trade.

1908 the Austrian Senior Lieutenant Gottlieb Hertschik from Altbunzlau in Bohemia who has also been in the Egyptian military service, purchased the castle for 100.000 gold mark and lived there together with his wife Elisabeth Nierstrasz. She engaged the Elisabeth-Hertschick-children's home from 1934 until 1936 the Nazi “Volkswohlfahrt” (welfare of the nation) took over the castle and established the first mother home of the Ostmark. During the Second World War it was an outstation of the state gynaecological hospital and Bamberg was situated in the castle. During this time over 1500 children were born at Burgellern castle.

After the war, 1948–62, a pulmonary sanatorium under the leadership of the lung specialist Dr. Schicht was situated in Burgellern Castle. After years of vacancy the castle was hosting a religious community, the Morija-Mission. Until 1994 the family Topf were running a Christian conference centre in the castle. During the following vacancy the building and the 7ha of castle grounds fell into disrepair.

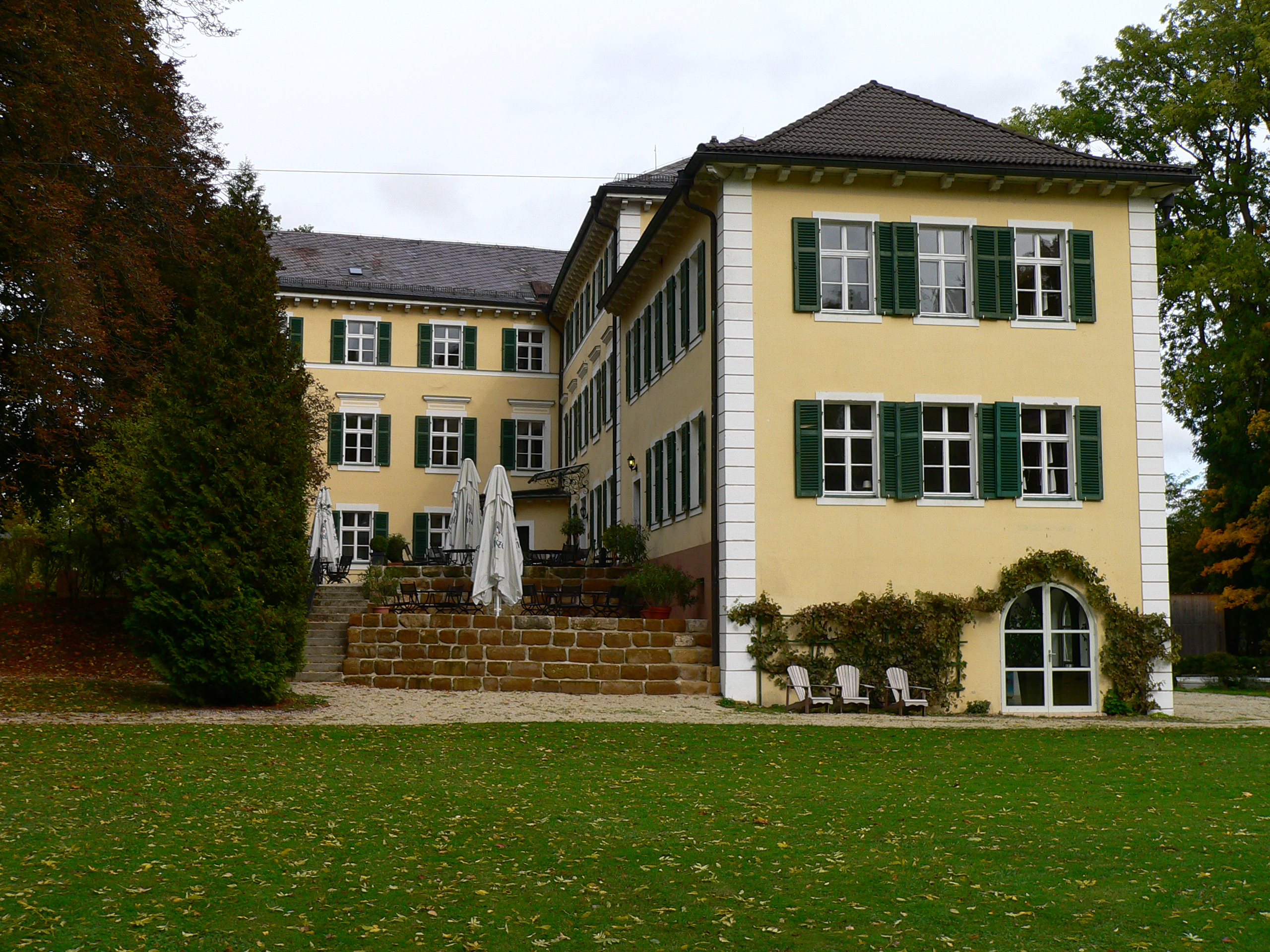
Burgellern Castle today

Only as it was turned into private property by the Kastner family from Bayreuth in 2005, the castle could be saved from further deterioration. With the restructuring and conversion of the castle into a Hotel and Restaurant, the progressive reconstruction started in 2006. In the castle grounds the path network was rebuilt, the castle was reopened 2008, the natural pool was reactivated and 2013 the restored pump house was reopened. The castle today provides all in all 22 guest rooms as well as conference and event rooms.
