= Quaglio =

The surname Quaglio belongs to a large family of artists, including painters, architects, and scenographers (stage designers), originally from Laino, between Lake Como and Lake Lugano. They were active mainly from the 17th to 20th century, both in Italy and in Austria and Germany. They include:

- Giulio Quaglio the Elder (1610–1658)
- Giulio Quaglio the Younger (1668–1751)
- Giovanni Maria Quaglio the Elder (1700–1765)
- Domenico Quaglio the Elder (1708–1773)
- Lorenzo Quaglio the Elder (1730–1804)
- Giuseppe Quaglio (1747–1828)
- Giulio Quaglio III (1764–1801)
- Giovanni Maria Quaglio the Younger (1772–1803)
- Angelo Quaglio the Elder (1778–1815)
- Domenico Quaglio the Younger (1787–1837)
- Lorenzo Quaglio the Younger (1793–1869)
- Simon Quaglio (1795–1878)
- Angelo Quaglio the Younger (1829–1890)
- Franz Quaglio (1844–1920)
- Eugen Quaglio (1857–1942)
