= Maximilian II of Bavaria =

King of Bavaria from 1848 to 1864

Maximilian II
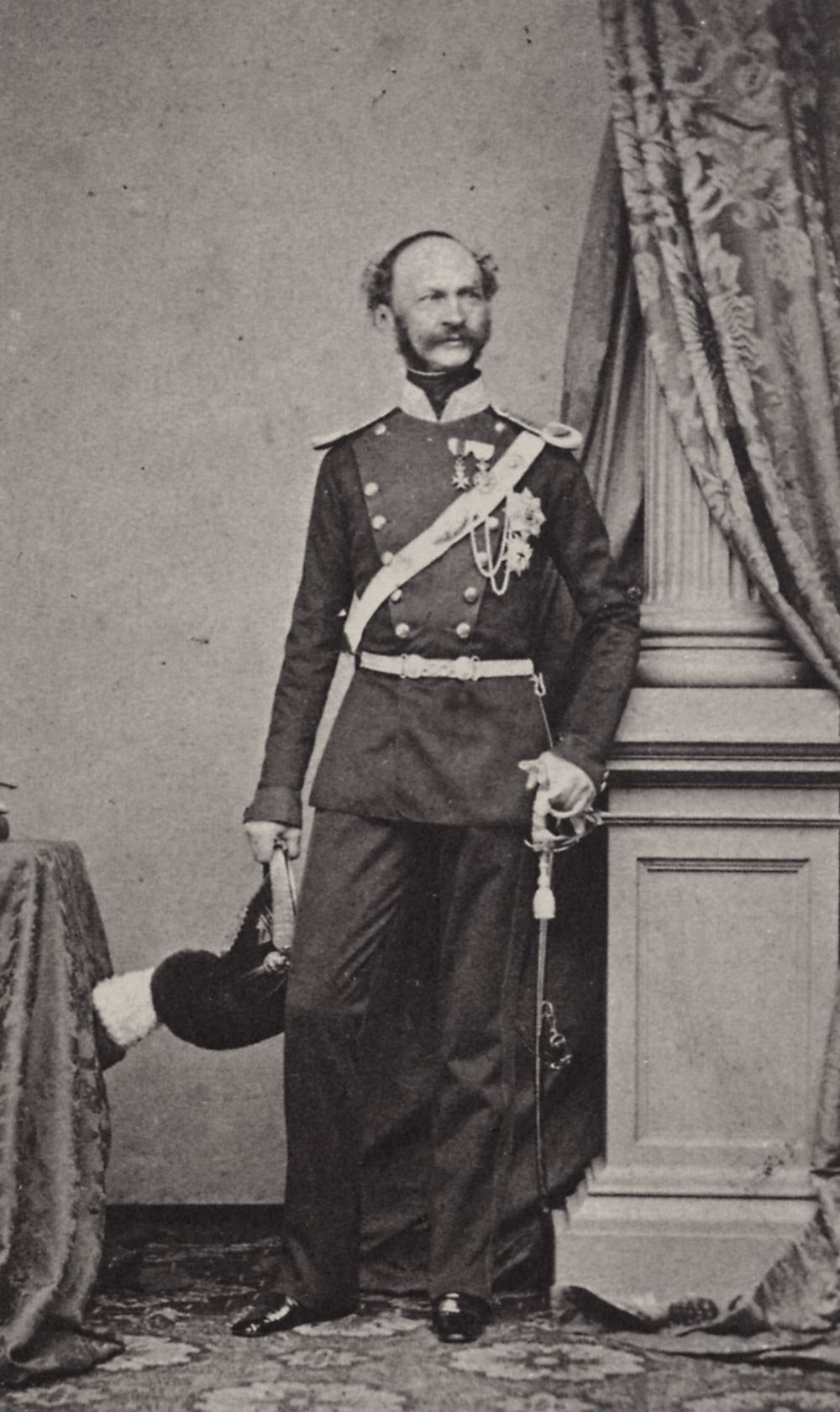

King of Bavaria
- Reign: 20 March 1848 – 10 March 1864
- Predecessor: Ludwig I
- Successor: Ludwig II
- Prime Ministers: See list: Baron Karl Ludwig von der Pfordten Baron Karl von Schrenck von Notzing Max Ritter von Neumayr
- Born: 28 November 1811; Munich, Bavaria, Confederation of the Rhine
- Died: 10 March 1864 (aged 52); Munich, Bavaria, German Confederation
- Burial: Theatinerkirche, Munich
- Spouse: Marie of Prussia (m. 1842)
- Issue: Ludwig II; Otto
Names
- Maximilian Joseph
- House: Wittelsbach
- Father: Ludwig I of Bavaria
- Mother: Therese of Saxe-Hildburghausen
- Religion: Roman Catholicism

Maximilian II (28 November 1811 – 10 March 1864) was King of Bavaria from 20 March 1848 until his death in 1864. He was the firstborn child and eldest son of King Ludwig I and his wife Therese of Saxe-Hildburghausen.

Ascending the throne upon his father's abdication during the German Revolution of 1848, King Maximilian restored stability in his kingdom. The rest of his reign was characterized by attempts to maintain Bavarian independence during the wars of German Unification and to transform his capital city of Munich into a cultural and educational city. He was very popular and took a greater interest in the business of government than in personal extravagance.

In 1842 he married the Hohenzollern princess Marie Friederike Franziska Hedwig, the niece of King Freidrich Wilhelm III of Prussia, with whom he had two sons. Upon his death, Maximilian was succeeded by their eldest son, Ludwig II.

== Crown Prince ==
He was born on 28 November 1811 in Munich as the eldest child of Crown Prince Ludwig of Bavaria (later King Ludwig I) and Therese of Saxe-Hildburghausen, named after his grandfather, King Maximilian I. His father ascended to the throne on 13 October 1825 upon the elder Maximilian's death.

After studying at Göttingen and Berlin and travelling in Germany, Italy and Greece, he was introduced by his father into the council of state (1836). From the first, he showed a studious disposition and declared on one occasion that had he not been born in a royal cradle, his choice would have been to become a professor. As crown prince, in the chateau of Hohenschwangau near Füssen, which he had rebuilt, he gathered about him an intimate society of artists and men of learning and devoted his time to scientific and historical study. The Wittelsbacher Palais was built for Maximilian as a Crown Prince Palace in Munich but was completed only when he ascended the throne.

== King ==
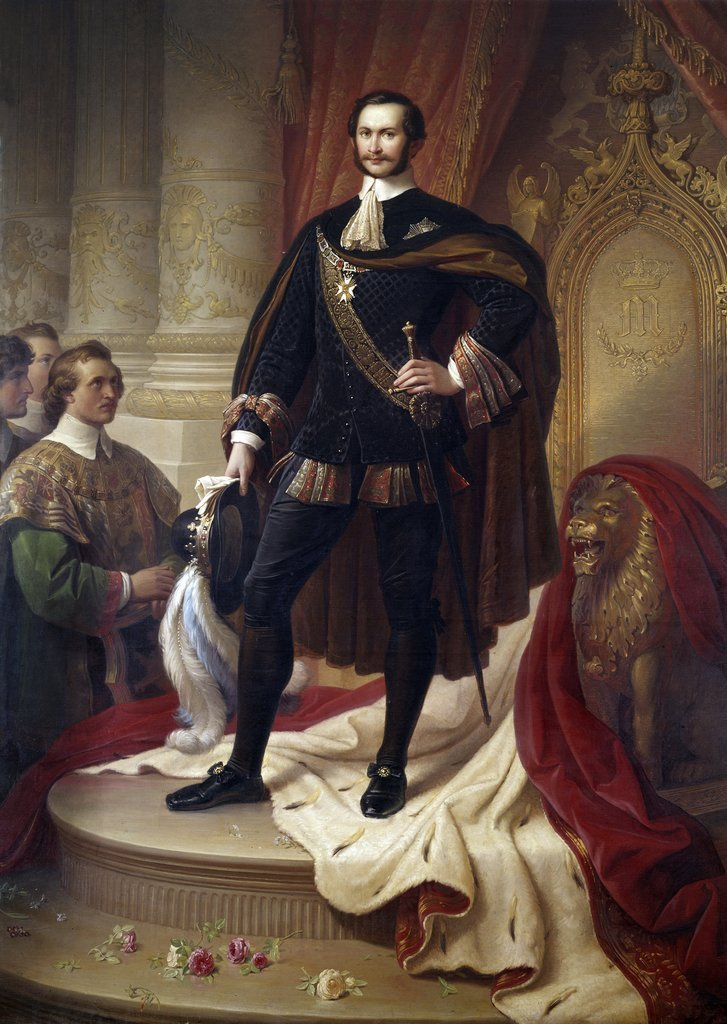
Maximilian II by Julius Zimmermann

When the abdication of Ludwig I (20 March 1848) called him suddenly to the throne, his choice of ministers promised a liberal regime.

=== Domestic policy ===
In 1849 an uprising in the Bavarian Palatinate was broken down with the support of the Prussian Army.

Though from 1850 onwards his government tended in the direction of absolute monarchy, King Maximilian steered a moderate course between the extremes of classical liberalism, Prussian-inspired Pan-Germanism, and the so-called "Ultramontanes".

In his attempts to transform Bavaria into a centre of culture, education, and the arts, he enraged conservative Catholics and Protestants by inviting a number of celebrated men of learning (such as Geibel, Liebig, Heyse and Sybel) to Munich, regardless of their religious views.

Devoted to his family and his people, the King also financed studies of the art, costumes, dialects and customs of the Bavarian peasantry. That was done to promote a separate national identity against Prussian-inspired Pan-Germanism.

Kingdom of Bavaria, Maximilian II, 1 Ducat 1853 (Rhine Gold)

The King was assisted in that by his Personal Private Secretary, Franz Xaver von Schönwerth. A native of the Oberpfalz region of the Bavarian Kingdom, Schonwerth's work collecting the folklore and traditions of his native district won him the admiration of the Brothers Grimm and made him a model for future folklore collectors.

=== Foreign policy ===
Maximilian II responded also to the demands of the people for a united German state by attending the Frankfurt Assembly which intended to create such a state. The progress of the 1848 Revolution, however, gave him pause. The king strenuously opposed the unionist plans of the Frankfurt Parliament, refused to recognize the imperial constitution devised by it and assisted Austria in restoring the federal diet and in carrying out the federal execution in Hesse-Kassel and Holstein. In the aftermath of the failure of the Frankfurt Assembly, Prussia and Austria continued to debate which monarchy had the inherent right to rule Germany.

The dispute between Austria and the Electoral Prince of Hesse-Kassel was used by Austria and its allies, including Bavaria, to promote the isolation of Prussia in German political affairs. This almost led to war when Austria, Bavaria and other allies moved troops through Bavaria towards Hesse-Kassel in 1850. However, the Prussian Army backed down and accepted the principle of dual leadership. The event was known as the Punctation of Olmütz, considered a "humiliation" by Prussia. The event solidified the Bavarian kingdom's alliance with Austria against Prussia.

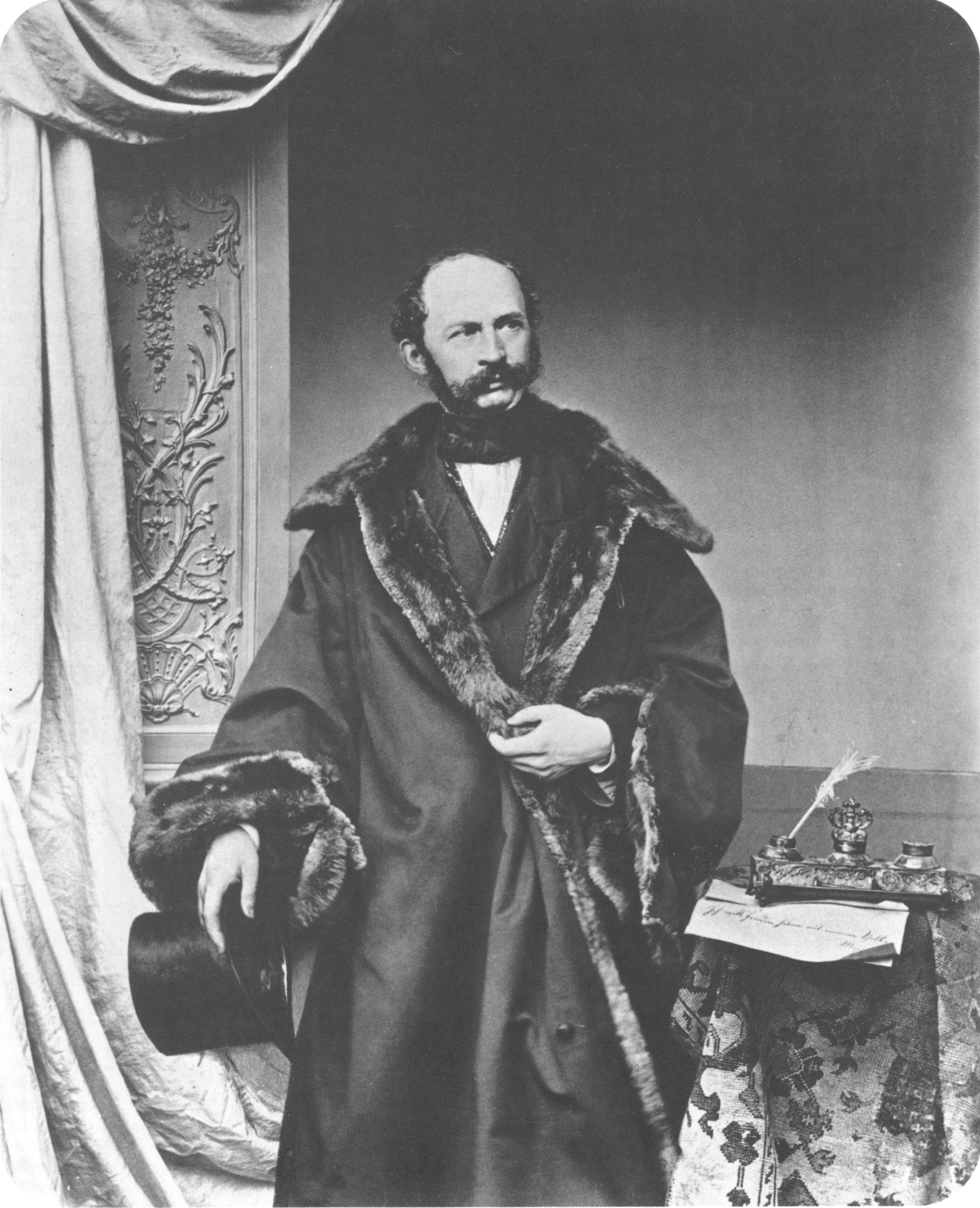
Maximilian II (1860, photo by Franz Hanfstaengl)

In his German policy, Maximilian was guided by the desire to maintain the union of the princes. During the cold warfare between Austria and Prussia, King Maximilian and his ministers favoured the former, which was a policy enthusiastically supported in Bavaria by both Catholics and Protestants. Simultaneously, however, the King and his Ministers also attempted to preserve Bavaria's independence by trying to play both powers against each other. That policy continued under his son, King Ludwig II.

In 1863, however, the King supported the project of reform proposed by Austria at the Frankfurt Fürstentag.

Attempts by Austria to reorganise the loose German Confederation were opposed by Prussia and therefore the other German princes did not act on the reform proposals. The failure of those plans and the attitude of the Austrian Court towards the Confederation and the Schleswig-Holstein Question disillusioned King Maximilian. The last days of his reign were spent attempting to deal with the new situation created by the outbreak of the war with Denmark.

=== Later life ===
In the summers of 1849 and 1855, King Maximilian travelled his kingdom. Between 24 June and 27 July 1858, he undertook a journey on foot through his country, which began in Lindau. However, because of frequent rain, he repeatedly had to be carried physically.

In government policy, the King repeatedly requested the advice of his ministers and scholarly experts before making a decision, which led to long delays. In addition, King Maximilian often traveled to Italy and Greece, which also led to long delays.

After a brief and unexpected illness, King Maximilian died at Munich on 10 March 1864. He is buried in the Theatinerkirche there.

== Cultural legacy ==
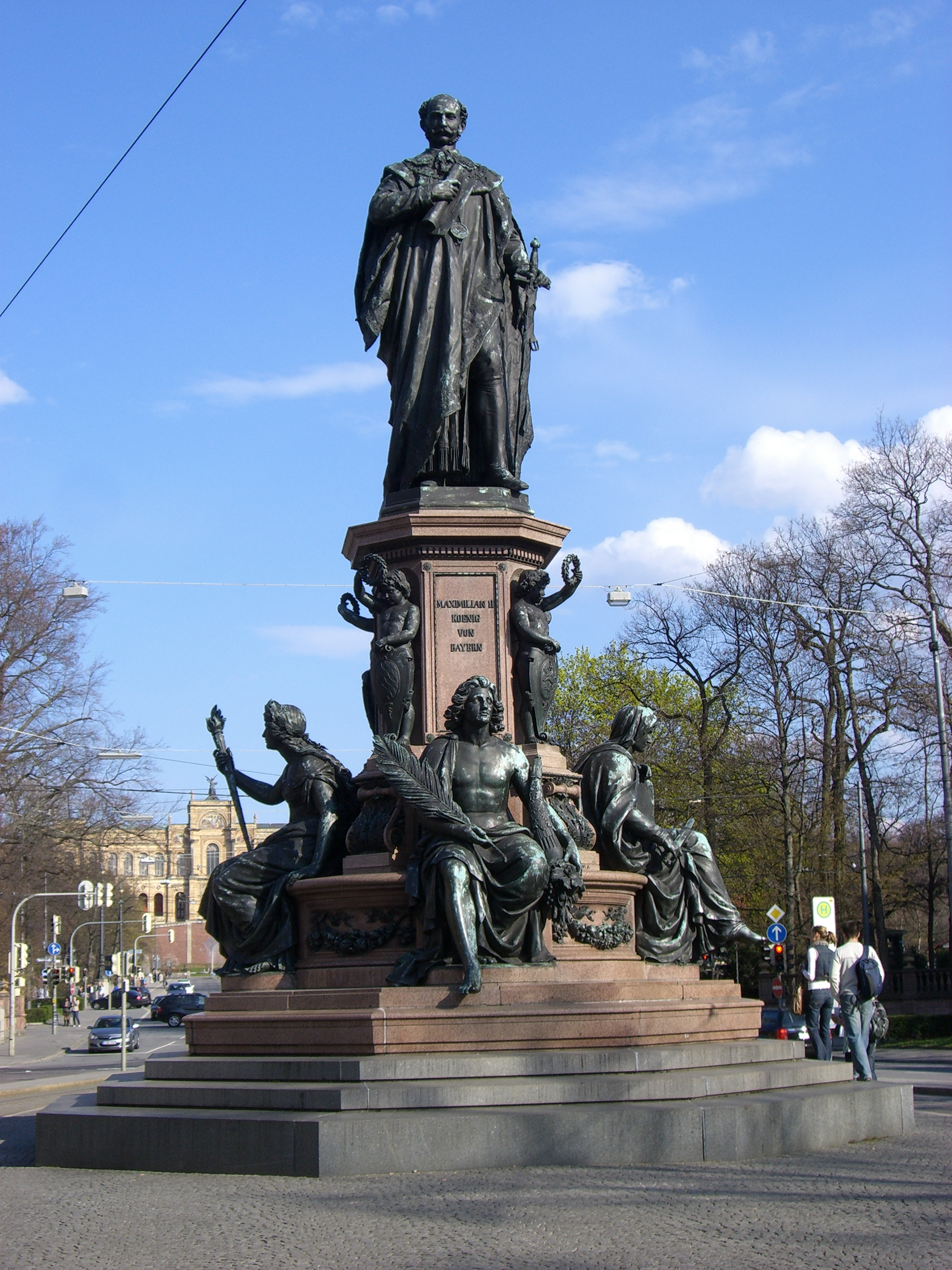
Monument of King Max II, Maximilianstrasse in Munich

Maximilian offered Paul Heyse and other writers from North Germany large stipends. Hans Christian Andersen visited "King Max" (as he called him) in his castle Starnberg, and wrote of him as a young, highly amiable man. The King, having read his novels and fairy tales, let Andersen know that he was deeply impressed by The Improvisatore, En Digters Bazar, The Little Mermaid and Paradisets Have. During the visit Andersen also read The Ugly Duckling. Later Andersen visited the King at the Schloss Hohenschwangau.

Hohenschwangau Castle

Next to Hohenschwangau Castle also the Hambach Castle was reconstructed from 1844 for Crown Prince Maximilian by August von Voit. In 1849 King Maximilian II instructed the architect Eduard Riedel to redesign Berg Castle in neo-gothic style with several towers and a crenellate.

Maximilian II was the principal of the Maximilianstrasse and the Bavarian National Museum in Munich. Compared to his father, Maximilian preferred a new architectural style with strong reference to the Gothic Revival architecture which would combine the best features of historical models combined with then modern building technology. The neo-gothic Royal Mansion in Regensburg was built for Maximilian 1854–1856, the Royal Mansion in Berchtesgaden and the Royal Villa on Rose Island already in 1853. The hiking path in Upper Bavaria called Maximiliansweg is named after him, as he made a longer hike in the Bavaria alps in the summer of 1858. The Bavarian Maximilian Order for Science and Art was first established on 28 November 1853 by King Maximilian II.

== Private life and family ==
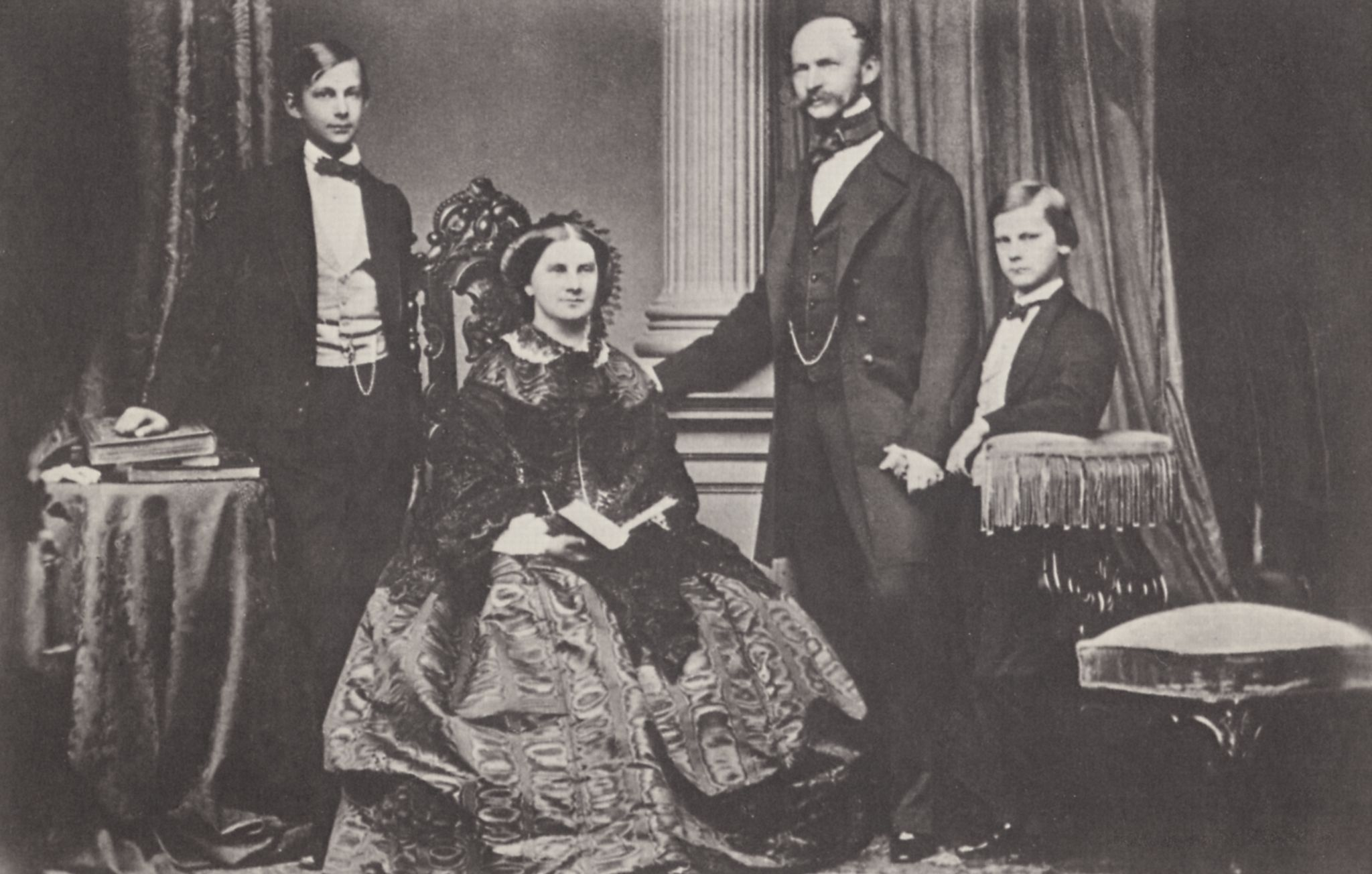
Maximilian with his wife and two sons, 1860

While king, Maximilian was hampered by constant ill health which often compelled him to travel abroad and, when at home, to live much of the time in the countryside. The relationship with his father, who had persisted in his architectural projects even after his abdication, was mostly tense. By his wife, Marie Friederike Franziska Hedwig, daughter of Prince William of Prussia, who he married in 1842, he had two sons:

- Ludwig II of Bavaria (25 August 1845 – 13 June 1886)
- Otto, King of Bavaria (27 April 1848 – 11 October 1916)

Both of his sons became king, were declared insane, and were later deposed.

== Honours ==
Greater Coat of Arms of the King of Bavaria

- Kingdom of Bavaria:
  - Knight of the Order of St. Hubert
  - Grand Prior of the Royal Bavarian House Equestrian Order of St. George
- Württemberg: Grand Cross of the Order of the Württemberg Crown, 1828
- Kingdom of Prussia: Knight of the Order of the Black Eagle, 23 January 1831
- Two Sicilies: Knight of the Order of St. Januarius, 1833
- Grand Duchy of Hesse: Grand Cross of the Ludwig Order, 18 December 1833
- (Saxe-Coburg and Gotha) (Duchy of Saxe-Altenburg) (Saxe-Meiningen) Ernestine duchies: Grand Cross of the Saxe-Ernestine House Order, March 1838
- Baden:
  - Knight of the House Order of Fidelity, 1840
  - Grand Cross of the Order of the Zähringer Lion, 1840
- Sweden-Norway: Knight of the Royal Order of the Seraphim, 17 December 1846
- Saxe-Weimar-Eisenach: Grand Cross of the Order of the White Falcon, 5 October 1847
- Kingdom of Hanover:
  - Knight of the Order of St. George, 1847
  - Grand Cross of the Royal Guelphic Order
- Austrian Empire:
  - Knight of the Order of the Golden Fleece, 1849
  - Grand Cross of the Order of St. Stephen, 1853
- Belgium: Grand Cordon of the Order of Leopold (military), 28 July 1850
- Electorate of Hesse: Knight of the Order of the Golden Lion, 18 October 1852
- Oldenburg: Grand Cross with Golden Crown of the House and Merit Order of Peter Frederick Louis, 24 August 1853
- Duchy of Modena and Reggio: Grand Cross of the Order of the Eagle of Este, 1856
- Grand Duchy of Tuscany: Grand Cross of the Order of St. Joseph

== Ancestry ==
Ancestors of Maximilian II of Bavaria

8. Frederick Michael, Count Palatine of Zweibrücken
4. Maximilian I Joseph of Bavaria
9. Countess Palatine Maria Franziska of Sulzbach
2. Ludwig I of Bavaria
10. Prince George William of Hesse-Darmstadt
5. Princess Augusta Wilhelmine of Hesse-Darmstadt
11. Countess Maria Louise Albertine of Leiningen-Dagsburg-Falkenburg
1. Maximilian II of Bavaria
12. Ernest Frederick III, Duke of Saxe-Hildburghausen
6. Frederick, Duke of Saxe-Altenburg
13. Princess Ernestine of Saxe-Weimar-Eisenach
3. Princess Therese of Saxe-Hildburghausen
14. Charles II, Grand Duke of Mecklenburg-Strelitz
7. Duchess Charlotte Georgine of Mecklenburg-Strelitz
15. Princess Friederike of Hesse-Darmstadt

Maximilian II of Bavaria House of Wittelsbach Born: 28 November 1811 Died: 10 March 1864
Regnal titles
Preceded by Ludwig I	King of Bavaria; 1848–1864	Succeeded by Ludwig II
