= Giulio Quaglio III =

Italian-born German scenic designer

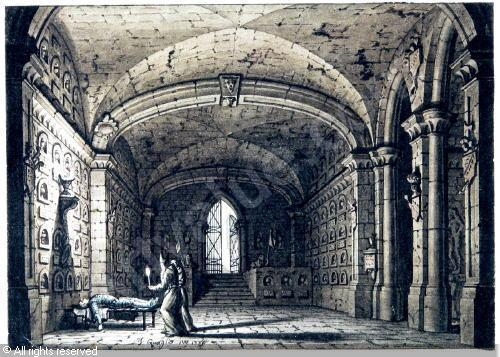
Two Monks in a Monastery Crypt (1788)

Giulio Quaglio III (1764 – 30 January 1801) was a scenic designer and architect from a branch of the Quaglio family of artists that moved to Germany in the 18th century and was the last to be born in the family's home town, Laino.

He began working in Munich around the years 1781–82, then moved to Mannheim. In 1785, he is known to have worked in Zweibrücken. Many years later, in 1798, he assisted Friedrich Wilhelm von Erdmannsdorff in providing decorations for a new theater in Dessau. Towards the end of his life, he returned to Munich and served as the court theater architect, succeeding his uncle Lorenzo.

His brother, Giuseppe Quaglio, was also a scenic designer.
