= Lorenzo Quaglio the Younger =

Italian painter

Lorenzo Quaglio the Younger (19 December 1793 – 15 March 1869) was a genre painter and lithographer, born in Munich in the Electorate of Bavaria to the long Italian pedigree of Quaglios.

== Life ==
Quaglio studied under his father, Giuseppe Quaglio and his brother Angelo Quaglio. He then went on to study at the Akademie München. He spent a few years, until 1812, working as a decorator of the court and national theatres in Munich. He spent time travelling through the Bavarian and Tirolian Alps. In 1812 his first lithography appeared, a study of nature. In 1820 he made a study of Bavarian folk costume. After 1834 he worked in Schloss Hohenschwangau.

He died in Munich and is buried in the southern cemetery.

== Works ==
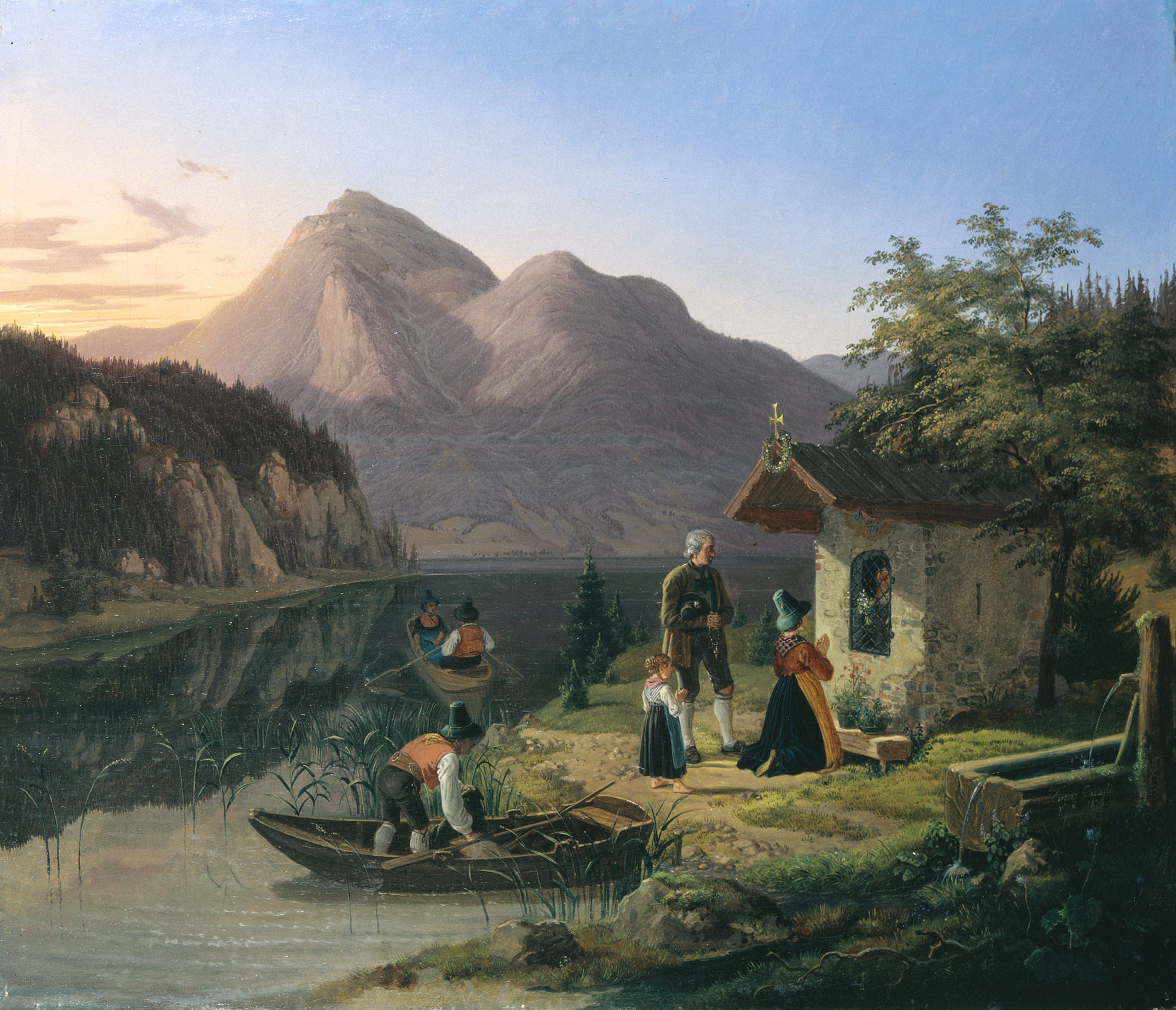
Gebirgssee mit Bauernfamilie, 1834

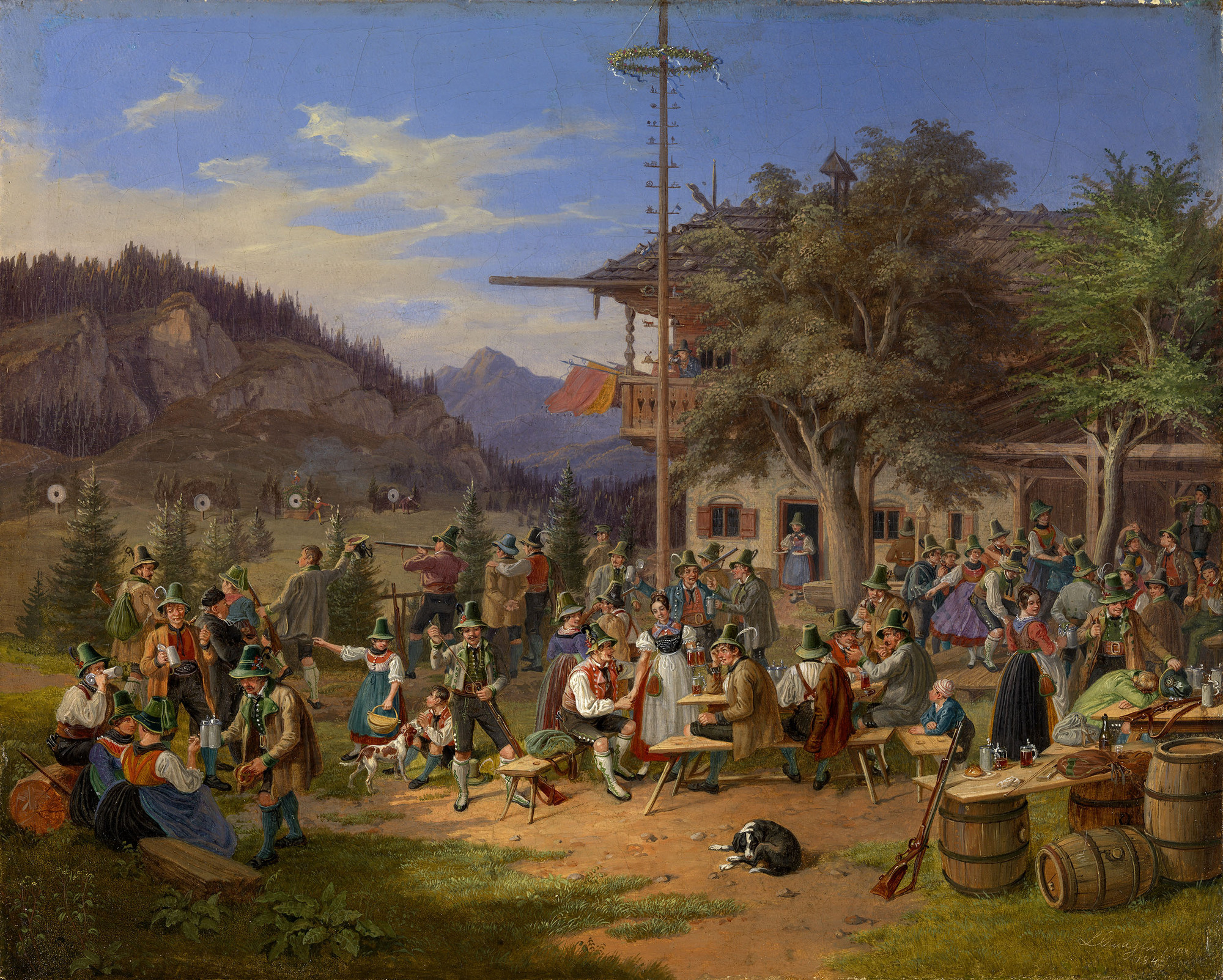
Tyrolean Festival, 1845

Quaglio created the following works:

- Im Dorf Kochel 1848
- Bauernbursche, am Eibsee bey Garmisch 1830
- Sennbube von der Hochalpe bey Garmisch 1830
- Hüterbub mit Krax´n, bey Garmisch 1830
- Die Alpe Hammersbach mit dem Waxenstein bey Garmisch 1830
- Buckelwiesen in Krün bey Partenkirchen 1830
- Alm am Eibsee bey Grainau 1831
- Lermos in Tyrol 1837
- Wirtin in Lermoos 1839
- Auf dem Weg nach Mittenwald 1839
- View of Frankfurt 1831 at Städel Gallery in Frankfurt

Campe wrote of him in 1833 the following:

He possesses a great ability to draw; execution of his treatment is tender, fluid and uncommon. In his backgrounds and in the details, one recognizes the practised painter of architecture, especially in the old German style. His compositions are true and perceptive; he knows how to portray the naive simpleness of domestic scenes with equal amounts of truth and feeling. Er besitzt eine große Fertigkeit im Zeichnen; seine Behandlung ist zart, fleißig und ungemein ausgeführt. In seinen Hintergründen und in den Beiwerken erkennt man den geübten Architecturmaler, besonders im altdeutschen Styl. Seine Compositionen sind wahr und empfunden; er weiß die naive Einfalt häuslicher Scenen mit eben so viel Wahrheit als Gefühl darzustellen.

== Bibliography ==
- Bryan, Michael (1889). Walter Armstrong; Robert Edmund Graves (eds.). Dictionary of Painters and Engravers, Biographical and Critical. Vol. II L-Z. London: George Bell and Sons. p. 331.
