= Domenico Quaglio the Elder =

Italian painter

Domenico Quaglio the Elder (1723–1760) was an Italian painter. He was part of the large Quaglio pedigree of Italian artists involved in architecture, indoor fresco decoration, and scenography (stage design) for the court theatres. He was born in Laino.
