= Angelo Quaglio the Elder =

Italian painter

Angelo Quaglio (1778–1815) was an architect, scenic designer, and painter born into the Quaglio family of artists. He was the eldest son of Giuseppe Quaglio. He designed and painted landscapes and architectural pictures for Boisserée's work on Cologne Cathedral.
