= Domenico Quaglio the Younger =

German painter

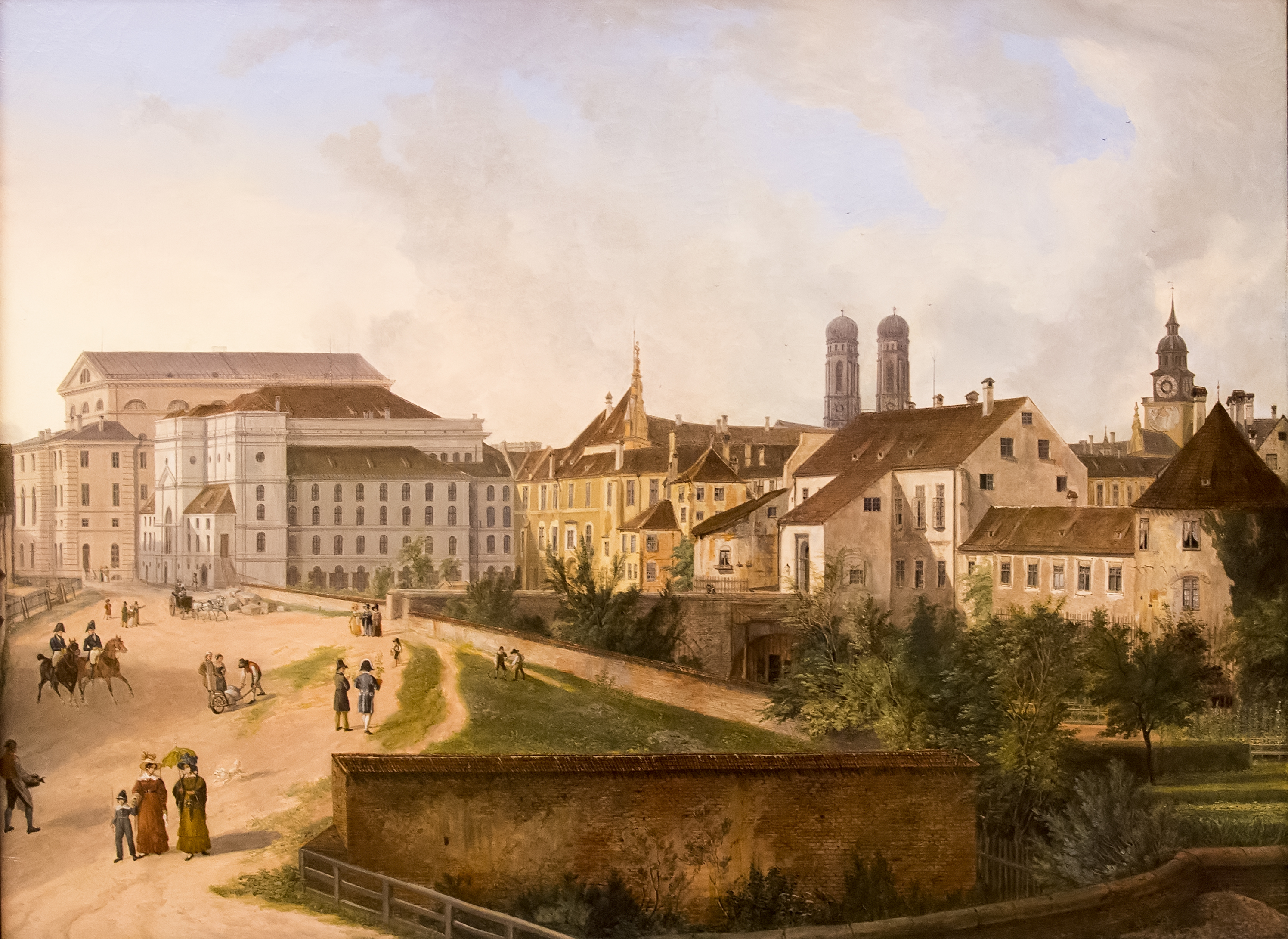
The Residenz (1827), Neue Pinakothek

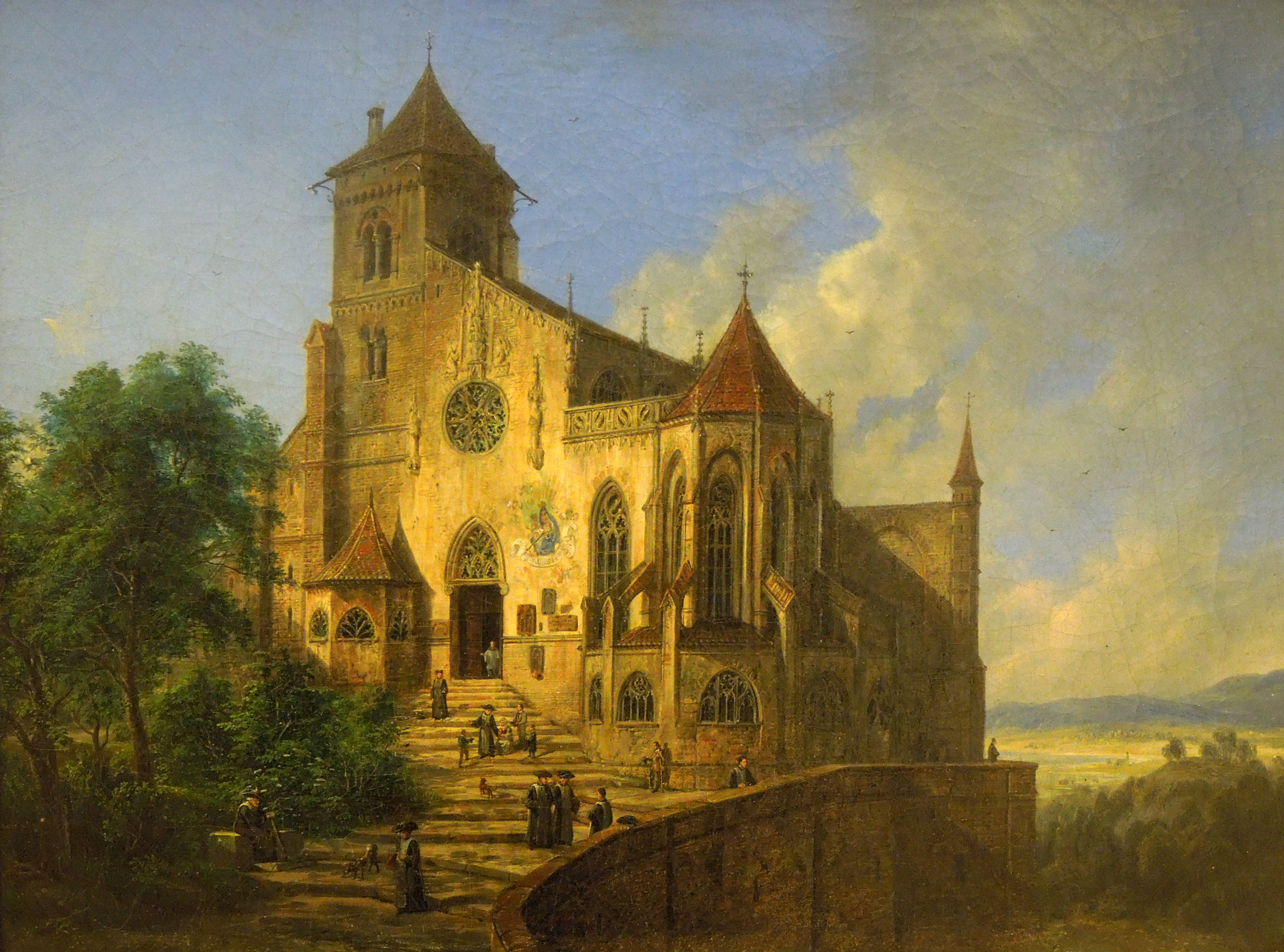
Landscape with a church (1830, National Museum in Wrocław)

Domenico Quaglio the Younger (1 January 1787 – 9 April 1837) was a German painter, engraver, stage designer, and architect. He was the second son of Giuseppe Quaglio and part of the large Quaglio pedigree of Italian artists involved in architecture, indoor fresco decoration, and scenography for the court theatres. He was known as a landscape and architectural painter/decorator, including quadratura.

He was born in Munich, in the Electorate of Bavaria. He was taught perspective and scene painting by his father, and engraving by Mettenleiter and Karl Hess. In 1819 he resigned his post as scene painter, and occupied himself only with architecture, for which he obtained subjects in the Netherlands, Italy, France, and England. As architect in charge, Domenico Quaglio was responsible for the Neogothic style of the exterior design of Hohenschwangau Castle, the summer and hunting residence of King Maximilian II of Bavaria, son of King Ludwig I of Bavaria and father of King Ludwig II. Quaglio died at Hohenschwangau in 1837. He engraved twelve plates of 'Architectural Monuments’‘, and lithographed thirty Remarkable German Buildings of the Middle Ages.
