= Hohenschwangau =

Human settlement in Germany

Coordinates: 47°33′30″N 10°44′30″E

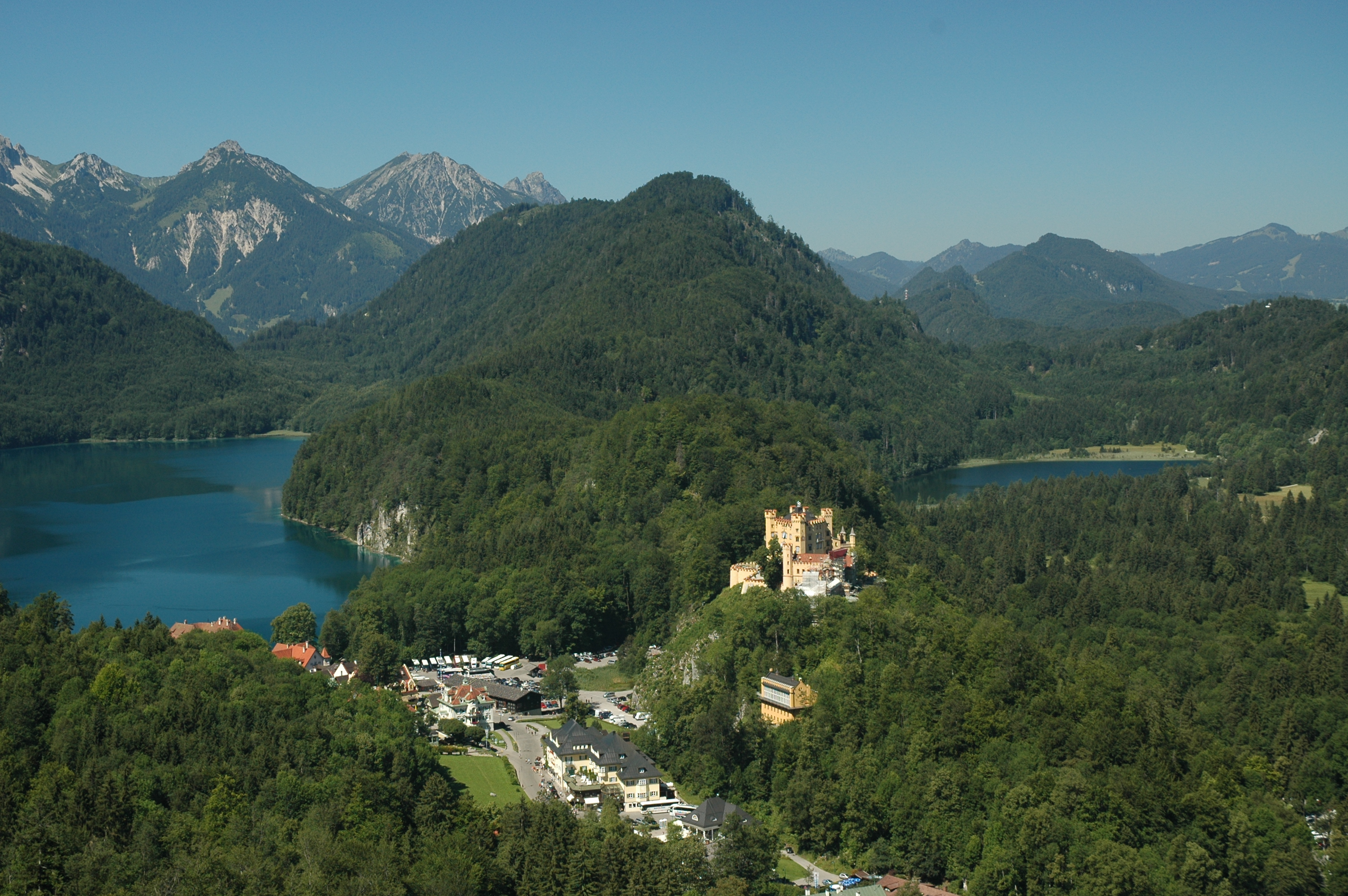
Village on left, Schloss Hohenschwangau on right, as viewed from the Neuschwanstein

Hohenschwangau (German pronunciation: [ˈhoːənʃvaːnɡaʊ]) is a former village and now an urban district of the municipality of Schwangau, Ostallgäu district, Bavaria, Germany.

It is located between Schloss Neuschwanstein and Schloss Hohenschwangau, and is visited by about two million people annually, where they start tours to the former royal palaces. The village is dominated by car parks, restaurants, guesthouses, hotels and souvenir shops.

Hohenschwangau is bordered by the Alpsee in the west. Here the Museum of the Bavarian Kings was established in 2011 in a former ancient hotel building (Alpseestraße 27).

The actress and singer Helen Vita was born in Hohenschwangau. Julien Duvivier shot exterior scenes for his film Marianne de ma jeunesse here.
