= Simon Quaglio =

German-Italian stage designer (1795–1878)

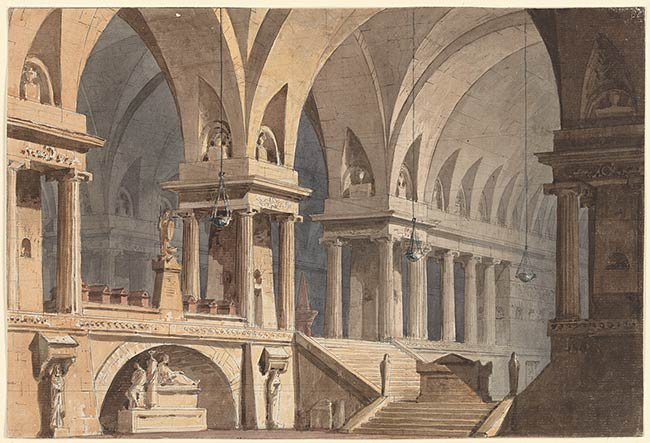
- A Vast Necropolis. Watercolor by Simon Quaglio
- Born: 23 October 1795; Munich, Electorate of Bavaria
- Died: 8 March 1878 (aged 82); Munich, Electorate of Bavaria
- Known for: Painting; Scenic design
- Movement: Neoclassicism
- Father: Giuseppe Quaglio
- Family: Quaglio

Simon Quaglio (23 October 1795 – 8 March 1878) was a German painter, stage designer and lithographer. He worked mainly in Munich and was among the first designers to use built scenery instead of painted flats. He designed over 100 productions during his career.

== Biography ==
Simon Quaglio, was born in Munich on 23 October 1795. He was a member of the Quaglio family originally from the town of Laino, between Lake Como and Lake Lugano. His father, Giuseppe Quaglio (1747–1828), practised scene painting in Mannheim, Frankfurt, and Ludwigsburg. His brother, Angelo Quaglio (1778–1810), was an architect and painter. Simon studied under his father and his brother, Angelo. After his brother's premature death, he was appointed as a court theatre painter in Munich in 1815. Simon worked closely with his father in his early years and, after his father's death in 1828, he was officially appointed as the Director of Decoration (Hoftheater-Dekorationsinspektor) at the Munich Court Theatre.

Quaglio was among the first stage designers in Germany to use constructed scenery (three-dimensional built sets) instead of traditional flat, painted backdrops. In 1840, he travelled to Paris to study and returned with the three-walled enclosed stage set, which he introduced as an improvement to stagecraft. Quaglio created around 100 complete stage designs, including sets for Mozart's The Magic Flute (1818) and Wagner's Tannhäuser (1855) and Lohengrin (1858). He also worked as a landscape and architectural painter and painted landscapes and architectural pictures for Boisserée's work on Cologne Cathedral. Quaglio was also an engraver and lithographer.

Simon Quaglio died in Munich on 8 March 1878 at the age of 82, and was buried in the Alter Südfriedhof in Munich.

== Gallery ==
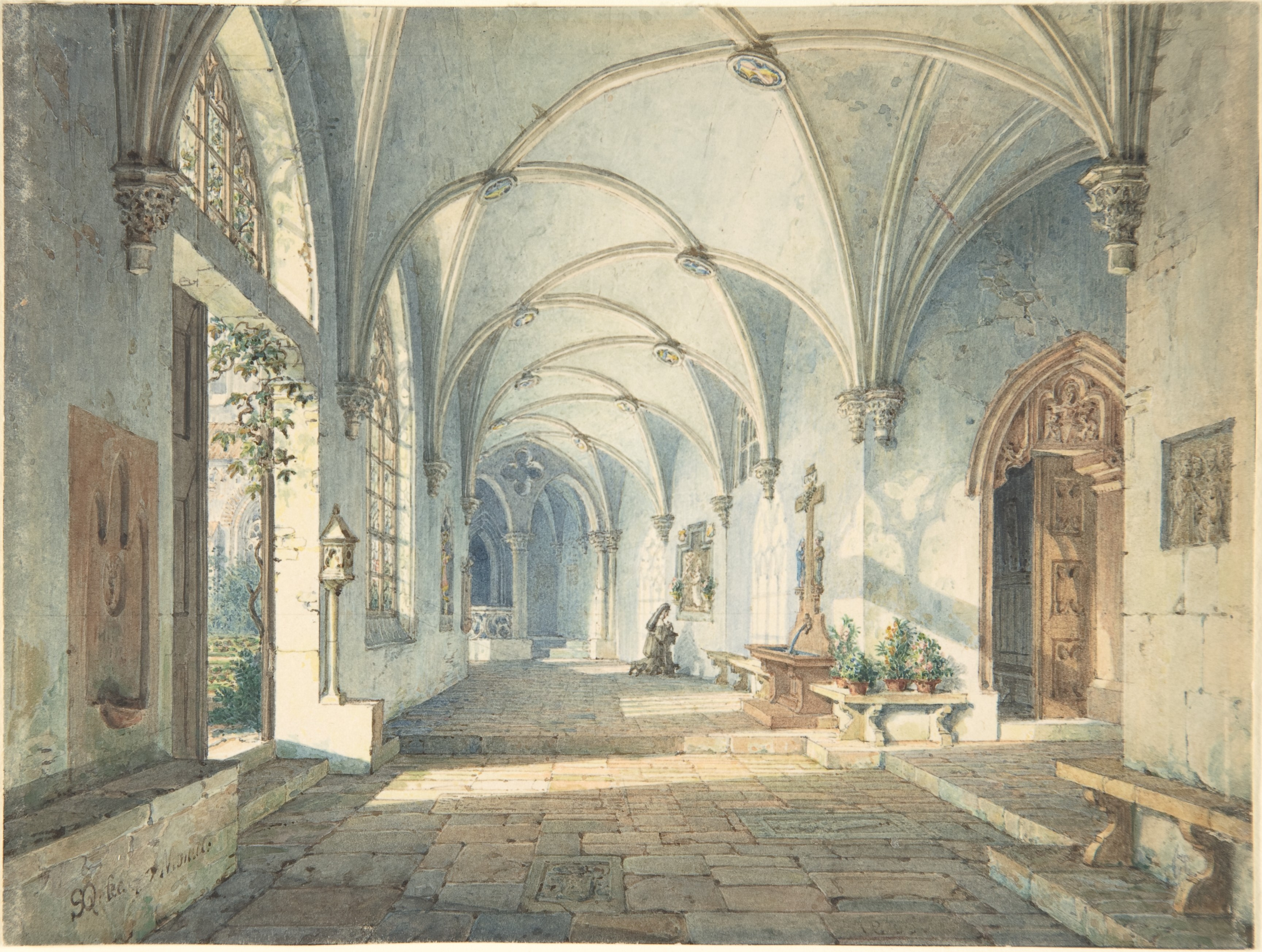
Cloisters in a Nunnery, watercolor, c. 1835, Metropolitan Museum of Art, New York

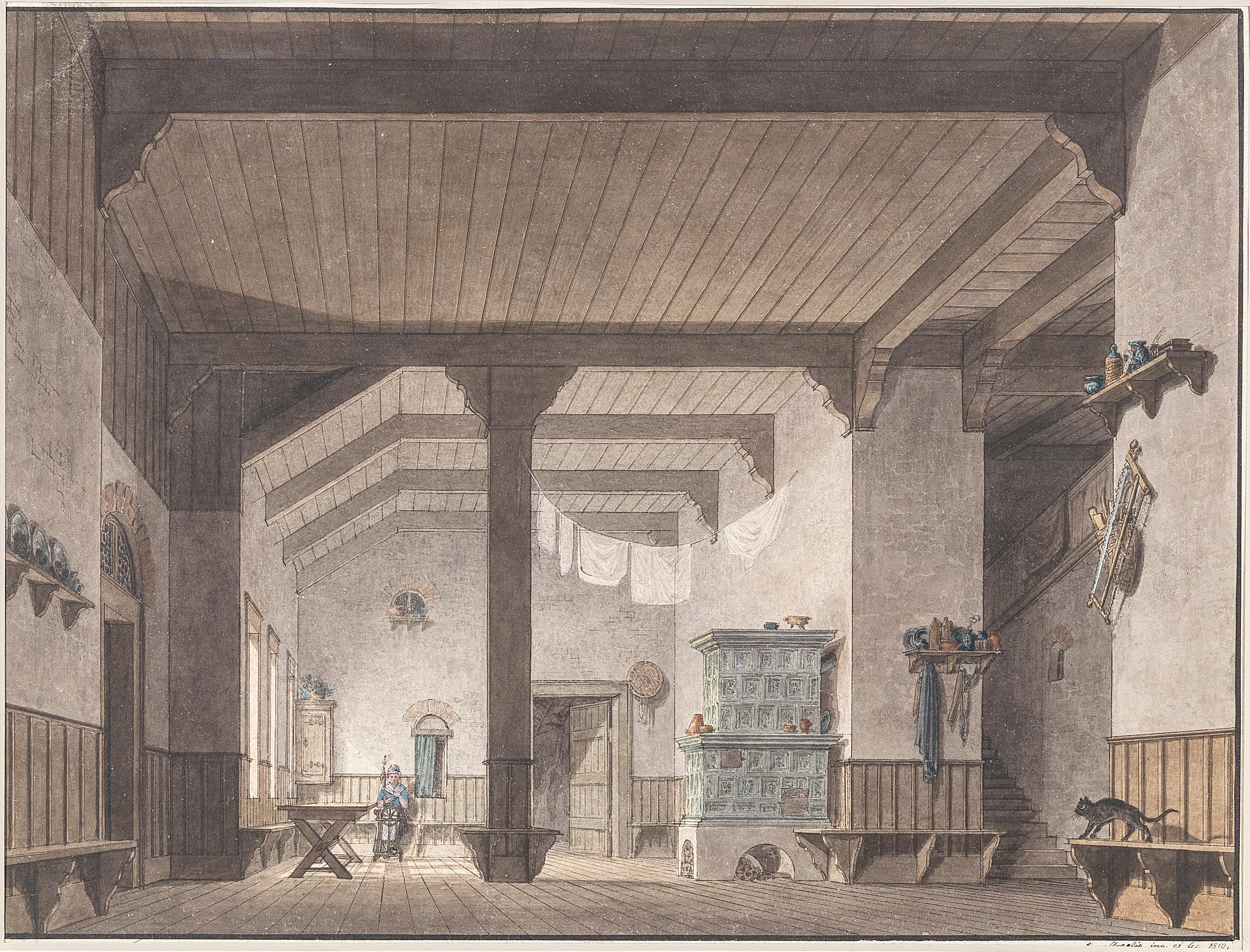
High Hall with wooden ceiling and tiled stove 1819, priv. col.

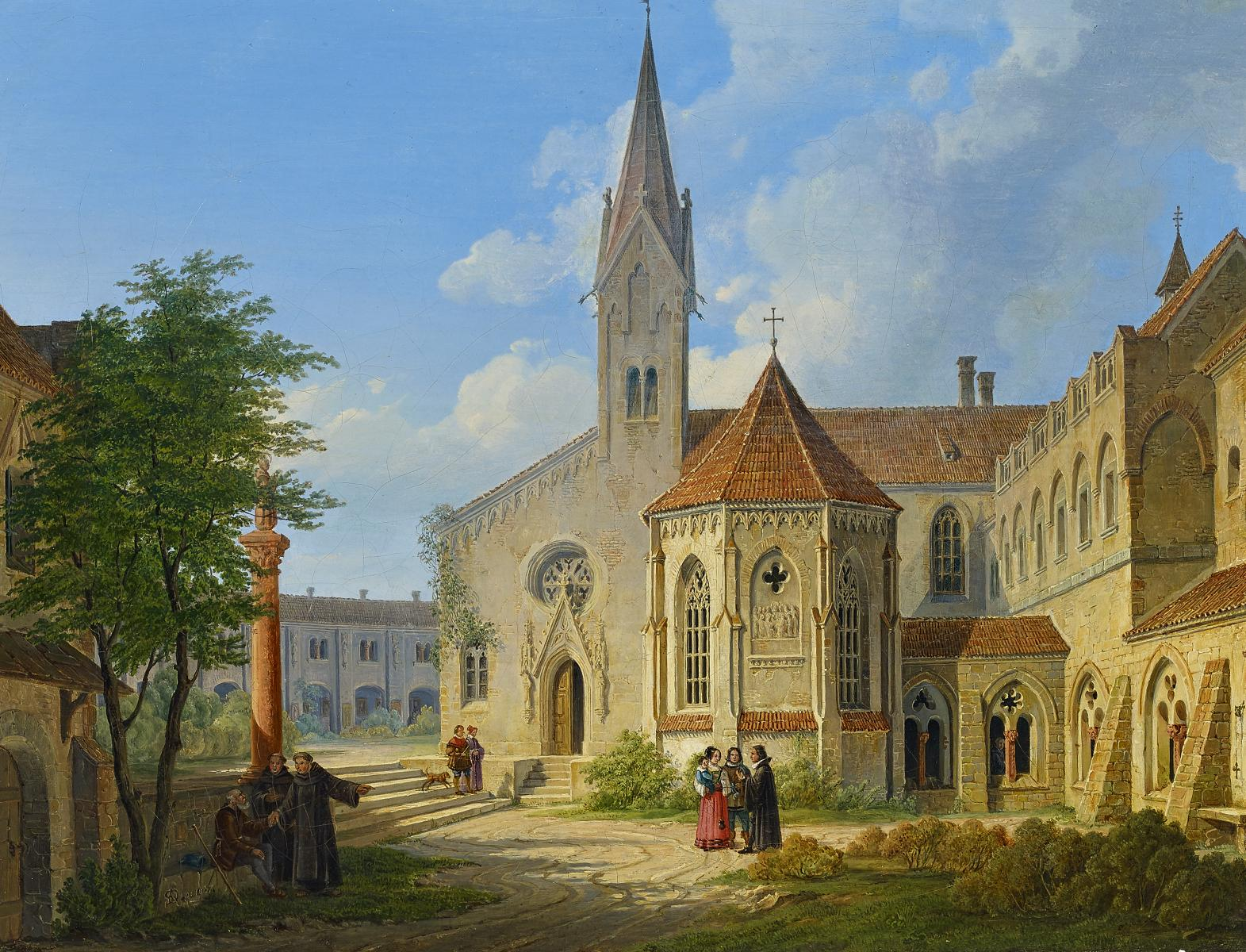
Monastery in southern Germany, oil on canvas, 1837, priv. col.

View of a Gothic monastery, lithography, Rijksmuseum, Amsterdam
