= Giuseppe Quaglio =

Italian painter (1747–1828)

- The Victim in the Temple, watercolor by Giuseppe Quaglio, 1790s
- Born: 2 December 1747; Laino, Duchy of Milan
- Died: 23 January 1828 (aged 80); Munich, Electorate of Bavaria
- Known for: Painting; Scenic design
- Movement: Neoclassicism
- Children: Simon Quaglio; Angelo Quaglio the Elder; Domenico Quaglio the Younger; Lorenzo Quaglio the Younger
- Relatives: Giulio Quaglio III (brother)
- Family: Quaglio
- Patrons: Charles Theodore, Elector of Bavaria

Giuseppe Quaglio (2 December 1747 – 23 January 1828) was an Italian painter and stage designer, active in scene painting in Mannheim, Frankfurt, and Ludwigsburg.

== Biography ==
Born in the town of Laino, between Lake Como and Lake Lugano, Giuseppe Quaglio was a member of the Quaglio family, a dynasty of Italian scenic artists, architects, and painters who worked extensively in Germany and Austria. He started off as a pupil of his father, then studied architecture and stage design in Vienna and made several study trips through Germany and Italy. Presumably at the instigation of his cousin Lorenzo, the first Quaglio to be engaged by the Elector of the Palatinate as court theatre architect, Giuseppe was summoned to Mannheim (1771) as a stage designer.

When the interior furnishings of the new Mannheim playhouse, built by Lorenzo from 1775, and of the famous Redoutensaal in Mannheim Palace were undertaken, Giuseppe painted various perspective frescoes for them. He also worked on occasion for the theatres at Ludwigsburg, Speyer and Frankfurt. He produced the stage sets both for the opening production at the new Mannheim court playhouse in 1777 and for Friedrich Schiller’s The Robbers, which had its first performance there in 1782.

In 1778 Giuseppe went to Munich with Charles Theodore, Elector of Bavaria and continued to work as a stage designer. In 1801 he stepped into the shoes of his brother Giulio Quaglio – who died young – as director of stage design at the elector’s court and Residenz theatre. Giuseppe created numerous stage sets here, especially in the two decades before his retirement in 1823. He produced sets for operas such as Georg Joseph Vogler’s Albrecht III. von Bayern (1781) and Wolfgang Amadeus Mozart’s Don Giovanni (1791) and The Magic Flute (1793), for plays such as Joseph Marius Babo’s Otto von Wittelsbach (1781) and for the festival performance of Die Weihe by Friedrich Albert Klebe, which opened the National Theatre in Munich (1818). Many designs are in the Graphische Sammlung and the Theatermuseum in Munich.

His contemporaries credited Giuseppe with inventing what was known as three-point perspective; in fact he borrowed it from the Galli da Bibiena, Bolognese stage designers, pictures of whose sets had been published in a book of engravings (Augsburg, 1740 ) by Johann Andreas Pfeffel II. He was the first to introduce to Germany the angled flats with overlapping boundary walls, passages and bridges invented by the Galli da Bibiena. In his designs for patriotic dramas about knights with castles and prisons, however, he also referred back to Piranesi’s Carceri d'invenzione. There are assorted variations of medieval castles and oubliettes in the collection of models by Giuseppe Quaglio assembled c. 1800 (Munich, Theatermuseum). He had a masterly ability to produce accurate imitations of historical buildings, such as Reims Cathedral for the set used in Schiller’s The Maid of Orleans (1801). He also suggested landscape with equally realistic sets, such as the Swiss alpine scenery for Schiller’s William Tell (1806). However, an imaginative reconstruction of the ancient Capitol in Rome, using authentic monuments as a backdrop, was designed in a strictly Classical style showing French influence. This design may have been intended as a final set symbolizing the period and setting of a dramatic spectacle, of the type habitually used from the beginning of the 19th century.

Quaglio’s detailed drawings and watercolours, executed with the precision of miniatures, tend to have a picturesque overall effect; they reveal an intimate, idyllic concept of space and a realistic representation of landscape. Giuseppe also showed great talent in arranging festive ceremonies and processions. On the occasion of Charles Theodore’s Golden Jubilee celebrations in 1783 he decorated the Alte Reitschule in Munich, and in 1790, when Leopold II was crowned emperor in Frankfurt, he was responsible for producing the Elector of Bavaria’s illuminated banners.

Giuseppe's sons include the scene designer Simon (1795–1878), active mainly in Munich; the architect Angelo Quaglio the Elder (1784–1815); Domenico (1787–1837), a landscape and architectural painter, scene painter, engraver, and architect; and Lorenzo (1793–1869), a genre painter and lithographer.

== Gallery ==
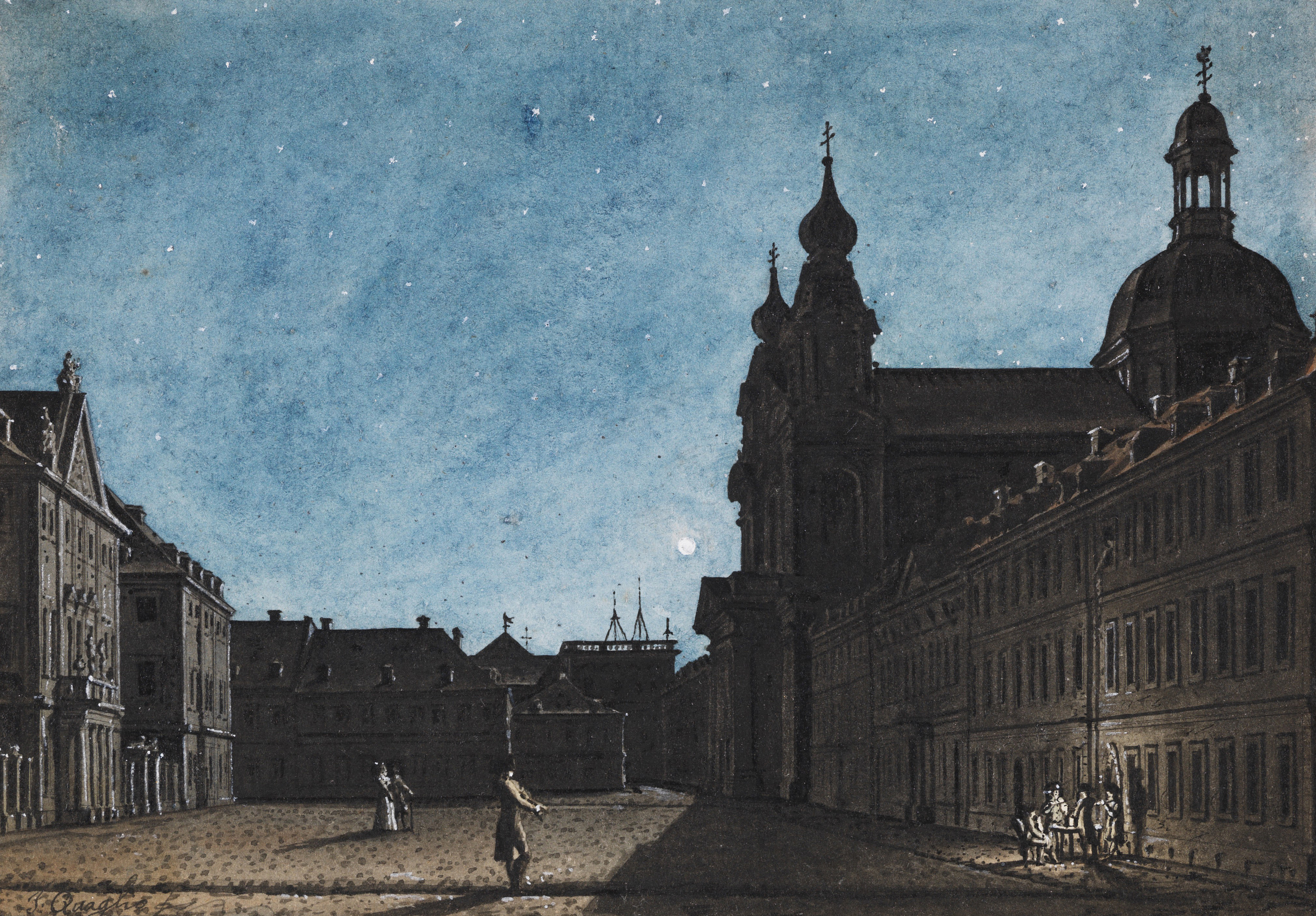
The Theaterplatz in Mannheim by Moonlight, c. 1790, priv. col.

Queen of the Night. Scene for Mozart's The Magic Flute, 1818, priv. col.

A Turkish Palace (probably for Mozart's Die Entführung aus dem Serail), 1790s, National Gallery of Art, Washington, D.C.

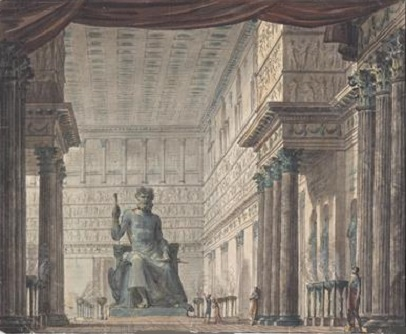
The Temple of Zeus, 1790s, priv. col.
