= Michael Chioldi =

American opera singer

- Born: May 24, 1970 (age 56); Pennsylvania, U.S.
- Education: West Virginia University (B.A.); Yale University (M.Mus.)
- Occupation: Opera singer (baritone)

Michael Chioldi (born May 24, 1970) is an American opera singer who has performed leading baritone roles in the opera houses and festivals of North and South America, Europe and Asia. He first appeared at New York's Metropolitan Opera in 1995 when he was a winner of the Metropolitan Opera National Council Competition.

== Life and career ==
=== Early years and first house debuts ===
Chioldi grew up in Avonmore, Pennsylvania, where his father was a steelworker. He received his bachelor's degree from West Virginia University and his Master of Music degree from Yale where he studied singing under Richard Cross. Following his graduation from Yale in 1994, he received further training at the Houston Grand Opera Studio and San Francisco Opera's Merola Opera Program. Chioldi's first appearance at the Metropolitan Opera was in April 1995 in the National Council Winners Concert. He made his official opera debut there as Fléville in Andrea Chénier in April 1996, and subsequently appeared as Pâris in Roméo et Juliette (1996), Wagner in Faust (1997), Yamadori in Madama Butterfly (1997), and Moralès in Carmen (1997). During his last year at the Met, Chioldi was awarded a study grant from the Licia Albanese-Puccini Foundation. In 2022 he sang Rigoletto in a new production at the Metropolitan Opera to wide acclaim.

Chioldi made his debut with the Washington National Opera in December 1995 as Figaro in Il barbiere di Siviglia. He went on to appear with the company as Fléville in Andrea Chenier, First Mate in Billy Budd, the title role of Hamlet, Sharpless in Madama Butterfly, Enrico Ashton in Lucia di Lammermoor, and Giorgio Germont in La traviata. He made his San Francisco Opera debut as Dr. Falke in Die Fledermaus in 1996 and the following year appeared as Schaunard in La bohème and in the roles of Jack, Supervisor Kopp, and Stonewall Girl in the West Coast premiere of Stewart Wallace's opera Harvey Milk, based on the life of the San Francisco politician and gay rights activist Harvey Milk, who was assassinated in 1978. Chioldi also appears on the world premiere recording of the opera.

Chioldi's debut with New York City Opera came in 1999 as Le chat in L'enfant et les sortilèges. He became a regular performer with the company, most notably as Count Almaviva in Le nozze di Figaro, Escamillo in Carmen, Doctor Malatesta in Don Pasquale, Belcore in L'elisir d'amore, Peter in Hansel and Gretel, Sharpless in the 2008 Emmy Award-winning Madama Butterfly, and Baron Scarpia in Tosca. He also sang in New York City with the Opera Orchestra of New York as Ottakar in their 2005 concert performance of Der Freischütz.

=== Later appearances with American opera companies ===
Chioldi first appeared with Palm Beach Opera in 2003 as Enrico Ashton in Lucia di Lammermoor. He went on to perform with the company in roles that included Doctor Malatesta in Don Pasquale, Giorgo Germont in La traviata, Sharpless in Madama Butterfly, the title role of Macbeth (his role debut), Baron Scarpia in Tosca, and the title role in Rigoletto. In Texas, he has performed with Austin Opera as Renato in Un Ballo in Maschera, Sharpless in Madame Butterfly, Giorgio Germont in La traviata, Iago in Otello, Rodrigo in Don Carlo, and the title role in Rigoletto. He also appeared as Baron Scarpia with San Antonio Opera, as Ford in Falstaff with Fort Worth Opera, and as Abimelech in Samson and Delilah with Dallas Opera.

Chioldi's appearances with other American opera companies include: Virginia Opera (High Priest of Dagon in Samson and Delilah, Jochanaan in Salome and Tonio in Pagliacci); Chicago Opera Theatre (Giacomo in Giovanna d'Arco); New Orleans Opera (Enrico Ashton in Lucia di Lammermoor and the title role in Macbeth); Chautauqua Opera (title role in Macbeth); Lyric Opera Baltimore (title role in Nabucco); Utah Opera (Baron Scarpia in Tosca); (Giorgio Germont in La traviata); Chicago Opera Theater (title role in Gianni Schicchi); Opera Las Vegas (title role in Rigoletto); Opera Saratoga (Ford in Falstaff); and Ópera de Puerto Rico (Baron Scarpia in Tosca).

=== International appearances ===
Chioldi has appeared in Canada with Toronto's Opera Atelier as Figaro in Le nozze di Figaro, as Méduse in Lully's Persée, and in the title role in Don Giovanni. In Asia and the Middle East, he has appeared in concerts at the Shenzhen Belt & Road International Music Festival and the Qingdao International Music Festival; as Papageno in a touring production of Die Zauberflöte with the New Japan Philharmonic conducted by Seiji Ozawa; as Count Almaviva in Le nozze di Figaro with the San Francisco Opera at the Macau International Music Festival; and the title role in Macbeth at the Royal Opera House Muscat. In Latin America, Chioldi has appeared as Lord Dunmow in the South American premiere of Lennox Berkeley's A Dinner Engagement in São Paulo; as Iago in Otello with the Orquesta Filarmónica de Jalisco in Guadalajara; and as the baritone soloist in Mahler's Das Lied von der Erde at the Festival Internacional de Piano En Blanco & Negro in Mexico City. His European appearances include Metifio in the concert performance and recording of Cilea's L'arlesiana at the Opéra National de Montpellier; Scarpia in Tosca with Ópera de Oviedo; Gerard in Andrea Chénier and Miller in Luisa Miller at the Gran Teatre del Liceu in Barcelona; the title role of Macbeth at the Teatro Verdi in Trieste; Marcello in La bohème at London's Royal Albert Hall; and the title role in Der fliegende Holländer at Pforzheim Opera in Germany.

=== Operatic rarities ===
In addition to his appearances in Harvey Milk and A Dinner Engagement, Chioldi has sung in a number of other contemporary operas and operatic rarities during his career. In 1993, while still a student at Yale, he appeared as The Third Player in The Protagonist, Kurt Weill's first opera, in its American premiere at Santa Fe Opera. In 1999 he created the role of Lucius Harney in the world premiere of Stephen Paulus's opera Summer based on Edith Wharton's novel of the same name. He appears as Jean Sorel in the first commercial recording of Gian Carlo Menotti's The Consul with Berkshire Opera in 1998 and reprised the role in 2009 with Glimmerglass Opera. In 2002, he sang in the world premiere of Charles Wuorinen's The Haroun Songbook and in 2004 sang John Proctor in Toledo Opera's production of Robert Ward's The Crucible. The role of The Man in Anthony Brandt's chamber opera The Birth of Something was written especially for Chioldi's voice. He sang the role in the opera's first staged performance and on its 2009 recording.

With Odyssey Opera, a Boston-based company specializing in rarely performed operas, Chioldi sang the cavaliere di Belfiore in Verdi's Un giorno di regno (2014), Ford in Vaughan Williams's Sir John in Love (2015), and the title role in Saint-Saëns's Henry VIII (2019). He appeared in 2011 as Jim Thompson in an UrbanArias production of Glory Denied, Tom Cipullo's opera based on the life of Jim Thompson, the longest-held American prisoner of war in U.S. history. In 2017, he was the baritone soloist in Vermont Opera Project's production of The Andrée Expedition, Dominick Argento's monodrama based on S. A. Andrée's ill-fated 1897 Arctic expedition. In New York City, he sang with Dicapo Opera in its 2008 production of The Dangerous Liaisons, Opéra Français de New York in its 2009 program "Debussy & Poe: Fall of the House of Usher & Devil in the Belfry", and with the revived New York City Opera as L'Ondino in Respighi's La campana sommersa in 2017.

== Recordings ==
- Anthony Brandt: The Birth of Something – Karol Bennett (Soprano), Michael Chioldi (Baritone); Brian Connelly (Piano). Label: Albany Records
- Charles Wuorinen: The Haroun Songbook Elizabeth Farnum (Soprano), Emily Golden (Mezzo Soprano), James Schaffner (Tenor), Michael Chioldi (Baritone); Philip Bush (Piano). Label: Albany Records
- Gian Carlo Menotti: The Consul – Beverly O'Regan Thiele, Michael Chioldi, Joyce Castle, Emily Golden, John Cheek; Berkshire Opera Company, Camerata New York Orchestra; Conductor: Joel Revzen. Label: Newport Classic
- Francesco Cilea: L'arlesiana – Marianne Cornetti, Angela Maria Blasi, Gaëlle Le Roi, Giuseppe Gipali, Stefano Antonucci, Michael Chioldi, Enrico Iori; Orchestra and Chorus of the Opéra National de Montpellier; Conductor: Friedemann Layer. Label: Accord
- Stewart Wallace: Harvey Milk – Robert Orth, Jill Grove, Gidon Saks, John Relyea, Elizabeth Bishop, Bradley Williams, Michael Chioldi; San Francisco Opera Orchestra and Chorus; Conductor: Donald Runnicles. Label: Teldec
