= Alfred Guzzetti =

Alfred Guzzetti (born 1942) is a maker of documentary and experimental films and videos. His work has been shown at the New York Film Festival, the Margaret Mead Festival, and other festivals in London, Rotterdam, Germany, Spain and France, as well as in installation settings in New York, Copenhagen, and Santa Monica.

== Education ==
Alfred Guzzetti was born in Philadelphia and attended the public schools there. He earned a BA from Central High School and a second BA from Harvard College. He studied at Birkbeck College, University of London, as a Marshall Scholar, and received a Ph.D. in English Literature from Harvard University, where he now teaches.

== Career ==
Following a series of films for theatrical productions, Guzzetti's experimental short film, Air, won first prize in its category at the 1972 Chicago Film Festival. Afterwards he embarked on an autobiographical cycle that included the feature-length Family Portrait Sittings (1975) and Scenes from Childhood (1979), both premiered at the Whitney Museum of American Art. These led to further autobiographical films, including Time Exposure (2012) and The Gifts of Time (2018), and to collaborations with the photographer Susan Meiselas and filmmaker Richard P. Rogers, with whom he co-directed Living at Risk: The Story of a Nicaraguan Family (1985) and Pictures from a Revolution (1991). These were political and historical documentaries and prompted later collaborations with Susan Meiselas on Reframing History (2004) and A Family in History, which includes Living at Risk plus a set of 20 short films entitled The Barrios Family 25 Years Later. In the late 1980s he began a series of conversations with anthropologist Ákos Östör that resulted in Seed and Earth (1994), a portrayal of life in a Bengali village, and Khalfan and Zanzibar (1999), which poses the question of an individual's relation to his culture. Both of these were made collaboratively with Östör and anthropologist Lina Fruzzetti. Around 1993 Guzzetti became interested in the experimental possibilities of the new small video formats and began a series of videos that included What Actually Happened (1996), Under the Rain (1997), A Tropical Story (1998), The Tower of Industrial Life (2000), which was shown in the 2002 Whitney Biennial, Down from the Mountains (2002), Calcutta Intersection (2003), History of the Sea (2004), and most recently, Still Point (2009) and Passage (2018). This experimental strain is related to his collaborations with composers, including his contributions to Earl Kim’s Exercises en Route (1971), as well as to Kurt Stallmann’s SONA (2005). He also worked collaboratively with Kurt Stallmann on Breaking Earth (2008), a gallery installation for 11 channels of sound and 5 video projections; Moon Crossings (2011), for 15 instruments, electronics and video; the single-channel Time Present (2013); Among Rivers (2019) for 7 projectors, 28 loudspeakers, and four performers; and Open Air (2023) with Kurt Stallmann and wind player Eric Mandat. With composer Ivan Tcherepnin he created the 16mm film Sky Piece (1978).

== Selected filmography ==
- Against the Light (2023) 12 minutes
- Passage (2023) 16 minutes
- Daybook (2022) 24 minutes
- The Falcon Cannot Hear the Falconer (2020) 15 minutes
- The Gifts of Time (2018) 78 minutes
- Renewal (2015) 5 minutes
- Time Present (2013) 17 minutes
- Time Exposure (2012) 11 minutes
- The Barrios Family Twenty-Five Years Later (2011) 131 minutes
- Still Point (2009) 15 minutes
- Reframing History (2006)
- Night Vision (2005) 2 minutes
- América Central (2004) 7 minutes
- History of the Sea (2004) 15 minutes
- Calcutta Intersection (2003) 10 minutes
- Down from the Mountains (2002) 9 minutes
- The Tower of Industrial Life (2000) 15 minutes
- Khalfan and Zanzibar (1999) 25 minutes
- A Tropical Story (1998) 9 minutes
- Under the Rain (1997) 10 minutes
- What Actually Happened (1996) 9 minutes
- The Stricken Areas (1996) 9 minutes
- Variation (1995) 5 minutes
- The Curve of the World (1994) 8 minutes
- Seed and Earth (1994) 36 minutes
- Rosetta Stone (1993) 10 minutes
- Pictures from a Revolution (1991) 92 minutes
- July (1988) 12 minutes
- Living at Risk: The Story of a Nicaraguan Family (1985) 58 minutes
- Chronological Order (1985) 4 minutes
- Scenes from Childhood (1980) 78 minutes
- Family Portrait Sittings (1975) 103 minutes
- Evidence (1972) 16 minutes
- Air (1971) 18 minutes
- Notes on the Harvard Strike (1969) 38 minutes

== Collaborative projects with composers ==
- Open Air (2023), approximately 35 minutes
- Among Rivers (2019), approximately 45 minutes
- Time Present (2013) 17 minutes
- Moon Crossings (2011) 16 minutes
- Breaking Earth (2008) 26 minutes
- SONA (2005) 6 minutes
- Sky Piece (1978) 10 minutes
- Exercises en Route (1971) 6 minutes

== Bibliography ==
- Andy Rice, "Documentary and Italian American Identity," in Italian Americans in Film: Establishing and Challenging Italian American Identities, ed. Daniele Fioretti and Fulvio Orsitto, Palgrave Macmillan, 2023.
- Scott MacDonald, Avant-Doc: Intersections of Documentary & Avant-Garde Cinema, Oxford University Press, 2015.
- Scott MacDonald, American Ethnographic Film and Personal Documentary: The Cambridge Turn, University of California Press, 2013.
- "A Few Things for Themselves," New Literary History, XXXIX (Spring, 2008), 251–258.
- "Let Us Be Reasonable, Let Us Ask for Everything," in Six Impossible Things Before Breakfast volume 2, ed. Tanya Leighton (2007).
- Jim Lane,The Autobiographical Documentary in America, University of Wisconsin Press, 2002.
- "Notes on Representation and the Nonfiction Film," New Literary History, XXVII (Spring, 1996), 263-270.
- "The Documentary Gets Personal/ Le documentaire à la première personne," catalogue essay for Cinéma du réel, Paris, March, 1993.
- William Rothman, "Alfred Guzzetti's Family Portrait Sittings," in The "I" of the Camera, Cambridge University Press, 1988.
- Two or Three Things I Know about Her: Analysis of a Film by Godard. Harvard University Press, 1981. ISBN 978-0-674-91500-8
- Translation of "Le film de fiction et son spectateur (Étude métapsychologique)" by Christian Metz as "The Fiction Film and Its Spectator: A Metapsychological Study," New Literary History, VII (1976), 75-105. Reprinted in Psychoanalysis and Cinema, Macmillan Press, Great Britain, 1982.ISBN 0253331056
- "Narrative and the Film Image," New Literary History, VI (1975), 379-392.
- "Christian Metz and the Semiology of the Cinema," Journal of Modern Literature, III (1973), 292-308. Reprinted in Film Theory and Criticism, 2nd and 3rd editions, ed. Gerald Mast and Marshall Cohen, Oxford University Press, 1979 and 1985.
- "The Role of Theory in Films and Novels," New Literary History, III (1972), 547-558.
