= Anthony Brandt =

American classical composer

- Born: 1961; New York City
- Education: Harvard University (B.A. 1983, Ph.D. 1994); California Institute of the Arts (M.A. 1987)
- Occupations: composer; academic; writer
- Organization: Rice University
- Spouse: Karol Bennett (wife)
- Children: Sonya Bennett-Brandt, Gabriel Bennett-Brandt, Lucian Bennett-Brandt
- Relatives: Boris Kroyt (grandfather)

Anthony K. Brandt (born 1961) is an American composer, academic, and writer. He is Professor of Composition and Theory at Rice University's Shepherd School of Music and the co-author with neuroscientist David Eagleman of the 2017 book The Runaway Species: How Human Creativity Remakes the World. As a composer, his works include three chamber operas, an oratorio, and orchestral, chamber, and vocal music.

== Life and career ==
Brandt was born and raised in New York City. His father, Nathan, was a history writer and an editor for American Heritage and Publishers Weekly. His mother, Yanna, was a television producer. His maternal grandfather, Boris Kroyt was a violinist (and later violist) who was a member of the Budapest String Quartet. Brandt began studying the violin at the age of seven and during his teenage years spent six summers at the Bowdoin International Music Festival where he had further training in the violin under Lewis Kaplan and took his first steps as a composer.

Brandt received his B.A. from Harvard University in 1983. After his graduation he spent a year in Paris studying on a fellowship at the Institut de Recherche et Coordination Acoustique/Musique (IRCAM). On his return, he enrolled in the California Institute of the Arts where he studied composition under Mel Powell and received his M.A. in 1987. He continued his composition studies with Earl Kim at Harvard, receiving his Ph.D. in 1994. His doctoral composition was Septet-a-Tete for flute, bass clarinet, two percussion, piano, violin, and cello. In 1994 he also received a Tanglewood fellowship. Brandt held visiting lectureships at Harvard, Tufts, and MIT before joining the faculty of Rice University's Shepherd School of Music in 1998 as an assistant professor. He has remained at Shepherd ever since, eventually rising to a full professorship and becoming the school's Chair of Composition and Theory.

Among Brandt's compositions are three chamber operas, an oratorio, and orchestral, chamber, and vocal music. One of his early commissions was from the Koussevitzky Foundation to compose a new string quartet for the FLUX Quartet, an ensemble specializing in contemporary music. His first chamber opera, The Birth of Something with a libretto by Will Eno, premiered on 24 February 2006 at the Hobby Center for the Performing Arts in Houston. It was subsequently recorded on the Albany Records label along with Brandt's The Dragon and the Undying for soprano and string quartet set to a poem by Siegfried Sassoon (a commission from the Bowdoin International Music Festival to celebrate its 40th anniversary) and the song cycle Creeley Songs for soprano and piano set to poems by Robert Creeley. His oratorio Maternity with a libretto by neuroscientist David Eagleman was premiered in 2012 by the River Oaks Chamber Orchestra who had commissioned the work. Brandt is also the artistic director of Musiqa, a non-profit organization dedicated to the performance of contemporary classical music, which he co-founded in 2002. In 2013 and 2016, Musiqa was a recipient of the ASCAP Adventurous Programming Award.

In addition to their collaboration on Maternity, David Eagleman and Brandt are the co-authors of the 2017 book The Runaway Species: How Human Creativity Remakes the World, described in Nature as "a lively exploration of the software our brains run in search of the mother lode of invention". Brandt is also a co-investigator in an NEA-funded research lab at Rice University which is "measuring the effects of music-making and music engagement on cognitive and social-emotional well-being."

Brandt is married to the soprano and educator Karol Bennett. They met during his time as a Ph.D. student at Harvard. Both were performing a concert by the Griffin Music Ensemble, a Boston-based contemporary music ensemble of which Brandt was a member. The couple have three children.

== Recordings ==
- Anthony Brandt: The Birth of Something – Karol Bennett (Soprano), Michael Chioldi (Baritone), Brian Connelly (Piano). Label: Albany Records
