= La chute de la maison Usher =

La chute de la maison Usher is the French translation of the title of Edgar Allan Poe's tale The Fall of the House of Usher (1839). The most famous French translation of the story is by Charles Baudelaire (first published in the magazine Le pays in February 1855 and included in the collection Nouvelles histoires extraordinaires in 1857). It is the basis of the following works:

- La chute de la maison Usher (opera), an unfinished opera by Claude Debussy
- The Fall of the House of Usher (1928 French film), a silent film by Jean Epstein
