= The Devil in the Belfry =

Short story by Edgar Allan Poe

- Short story by Edgar Allan Poe
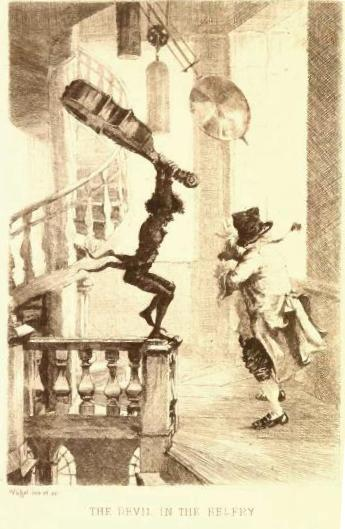
- Illustration for Tales and Poems, Vol. 2, Philadelphia, 1894.

Text available at Wikisource
- Country: United States
- Language: English
- Genres: Satirical; Short story

Publication
- Published in: Saturday Chronicle and Mirror of the Times
- Media type: Print (newspaper)
- Publication date: 1839

"The Devil in the Belfry" is a satirical short story by Edgar Allan Poe. It was first published in 1839.

== Plot summary ==
In an isolated town called Vondervotteimittiss (wonder-what-time-it-is), the punctilious inhabitants seem to be concerned with nothing but clocks and cabbage. This methodical, boring and quiet little borough is devastated by the arrival of a devilish figure playing a big fiddle who comes straight down from a hill, goes into the belltower, brutally attacks the belfry-man and rings thirteen o'clock, to the horror of the town's inhabitants.

== Analysis ==
The devil character can be seen as the bringer of chaos to an ordered system. In the context of the story, the devil is a troublemaker who destroys the serenity of tradition. However, in that Poe mocks the town's ridiculous traditions, it can be interpreted that the devil is a violent force of change, originality and creativity in an otherwise stagnant environment.

Some have claimed the story to be political satire making fun of the United States President Martin Van Buren, who was of Dutch descent like the inhabitants of Vondervotteimittis. However, aside from Dutch caricatures used for humor, the story does not seem to mock any particular target. In A Companion to Poe Studies it is noted, "Poe introduced numerous details to make contemporaries think of the president. But the story is not therefore a political satire, for Poe said such stories hit out in all directions ... Moreover, Poe's literary play, his pleasure at creating connections, seems more important than is any single 'target' of satire."

Critics often compare the tale to another New York satire, A History of New York, written by Washington Irving under the pseudonym "Diedrich Knickerbocker".

== Publication history ==
The story was first published in the May 18, 1839 issue of Philadelphia's Saturday Chronicle and Mirror of the Times.

There are many famous illustrations for this short tale, including one by the Italian engraver Alberto Martini, which is very accurate in describing the final moment, and another by the Belgian artist James Ensor, which illustrates the moment when the stranger arrives in town.

== Adaptations ==
Between 1902 and 1911 or 1912, French composer Claude Debussy worked on a one-act opera based on "The Devil in the Belfry", Le diable dans le beffroi. This short opera was to be presented with La chute de la maison Usher, another one-act opera based on Poe's "The Fall of the House of Usher". For his adaptation of "The Devil in the Belfry", Debussy said he wanted to create "a happy blending of the real and the fantastic". His version of the devil, he said, would "put an end to the idea that the devil is the spirit of evil. He is simply the spirit of contradiction." Debussy's character of the devil was not intended to speak or sing, only whistle.

The story was also the subject of an opera by Italian composer Adriano Lualdi, premiered in 1925.

== Influence on popular culture ==
- The title of the rock group Black Rebel Motorcycle Club's 2010 album Beat the Devil's Tattoo was derived from a line in "The Devil in the Belfry".
- The 2011 Francis Ford Coppola film Twixt depicts a town with a seven-faced clock tower and claims that Poe wrote his short story as a result of his overnight stay in the town.
