= Kurt Stallmann =

American composer (born 1964)

Kurt Stallmann (born 1964) is an American composer who lives and works in Houston, Texas.

== Education ==
Kurt Stallmann was born in Rockford, Illinois. In 1987, he received a bachelor's degree in music from Northern Illinois University. That year, he moved to Boston, Massachusetts, where he composed, improvised, and collaborated with modern dance choreographers. In 1990, Yasuko Tokunaga invited Stallmann to join the Dance Division faculty at The Boston Conservatory to design a course for dancers that developed listening and analysis skills for the purpose of creating new choreography. In 1992, after several years of working with dance, he returned to a concentrated musical environment by entering the PhD program in music composition at Harvard University, where his primary teachers were Bernard Rands and Mario Davidovsky. As a student, he also assisted composer Ivan Tcherepnin with electronic music courses for several years.

== Teaching ==
In 1999, after graduating, Stallmann joined the Harvard Music Department faculty, as Assistant Professor of Music. During this time, he combined the two studios then at Harvard (HEMS, created by Tcherepnin, and HCMC, created by Davidovsky) into one entity, which he named HUSEAC (Harvard University Studios for Electro-Acoustic Composition). He also encouraged cross-disciplinary collaboration with other Harvard departments, including VES and GSD. During this period, he also founded the computer music studio at the Longy School of Music, where he also served on the music composition faculty. In 2002, Stallmann joined the faculty at the Shepherd School of Music, Rice University, where he is an associate professor in the composition department and director of the Rice Electroacoustic Music Labs (REMLABS).

== Composing and research ==
As a composer, Stallmann devotes his energy towards synthesizing many of the mediums available to composers today. His compositions are written for acoustic instruments, electroacoustic combinations with interactive elements, environmental sounds, and purely synthetic sounds. He also enjoys improvising with musicians and often collaborates with artists from other disciplines. Scholarly interests include a series of psychological studies on how musical sequences can affect time estimation. At the 2008 International Conference on Auditory Displays at IRCAM in Paris, Stallmann gave a paper titled Auditory Stimulus Design: Musically Informed.

In 2008–2009, Stallmann was Composer-In-Residence at Sharpstown High School for the Houston Symphony Education and Outreach Program sponsored by the Fidelity FutureStage program. From 2005 to 2008 he was on the SEAMUS Board of Directors (Society for Electro-Acoustic Music in the United States) while he served as editor of the SEAMUS Newsletter. He has also been an active member of two composer’s collectives, Musiqa in Houston (2002–2004), and Composers in Red Sneakers in Boston (2001–2003).

Recent works include Moon Crossings (commissioned by the Fromm Music Foundation), a 17-minute work for 15 performers, video, and surround sound system; Following Franz, Now, a string quartet with optional electronics for the Enso String Quartet (commissioned by Chamber Music America); Breaking Earth Meet the Composer (Commissioned by Meet the Composer Commissioning Music/USA Program and DiverseWorks ArtSpace), a 22-minute multidisciplinary installation with filmmaker Alfred Guzzetti for five independent streams of high-definition video with eleven channels of audio; and SONA: Wind, Rain, and Trains (Commissioned by the Houston Arts Alliance), a multidisciplinary work inspired by Houston's soundscape for string quartet with real-time digital processing, videos, found sounds, and synthesized sounds.

Stallmann's work was recognized by the American Academy of Arts and Letters with a 2009 Goddard Lieberson Fellowship. In 2008, he received a Guggenheim Fellowship.

== Official link ==
- Composer's Website
