= Karol Bennett =

American soprano

- Genres: Lieder; Chanson; Oratorio; Contemporary
- Instruments: Singing
- Spouse: Anthony Brandt (1991-present)

Karol Bennett is an American soprano known for her performances of lieder, chanson, and oratorio and her championing of music by living composers.

== Education ==
Bennett is a graduate of the University of Missouri-Kansas City, where she studied with Martha Longmire, and Yale University, where she was a student of Phyllis Curtin. Bennett also studied at the Salzburg Mozarteum with Crista Ludwig and spent two summers at the Tanglewood Music Festival.

In 1993, Bennett became the first classical singer awarded a fellowship at the Bunting Institute of Radcliffe College. Her class of fellows included novelist Ann Patchett, who later credited Bennett as the inspiration for the heroine Roxane Coss of her novel Bel Canto.

== Career ==
Bennett has appeared as soloist with the Houston Symphony, St. Paul Chamber Orchestra, Sinfonia Kracovia, Ekaterineburg Philharmonic, San Francisco Contemporary Music Players, Metamorphosen Chamber Orchestra, New York New Music Ensemble, Boston Masterworks Chorale, Boston Cecilia, Boston Classical Orchestra, Da Camera of Houston, Ars Lyrica of Houston, and the Borromeo, Cassatt, Chiara, Boston Composers, Da Ponte, Del Sol, Enso, Flux, Maia, and Mendelssohn String Quartets.

Bennett played the role of Mélisande in the Russian premiere of Claude Debussy’s “Pélleas et Mélisande,” conducted by Sarah Caldwell; she also travelled with Caldwell to Russia several times for cultural exchange programs, performing the Russian premiere of Leonard Bernstein's “Kaddish” Symphony in Moscow. Bennett has been a participant at the Bowdoin, Marlboro, Round Top, San Luis Obispo International, and Northwest Bach Festivals, and Artist-in-Residence at MIT, the Universidad Verucruzana, and International Festival of Music in Morelia, Mexico.

Since meeting at Yale as graduate students, Bennett and pianist/composer John McDonald have had a long musical partnership, performing recitals throughout the world. The pair were selected as Artistic Ambassadors for the United States Information Agency, touring Mongolia, Korea, and Taiwan. They were also awarded a Duo Recitalists Grant from the National Endowment for the Arts, touring several West coast universities. Reviewing their 10th anniversary concert in 1991, Boston Globe critic Richard Dyer wrote that theirs is a “partnership that can stand comparison with the great ones of the past.”

While in Boston, Bennett was a performer member of the new music ensemble Extension Works. She also performed frequently with other new music groups such as the Griffin Music Ensemble, Dinosaur Annex, Boston Musica Viva, Collage, ALEA III, NuClassix, Composers in Red Sneakers, the Harvard Group for New Music, and more.

After moving to Houston with her family, Bennett has been Resident Artist of the Houston-based contemporary ensemble Musiqa. In addition to extensive public performances, she has spearheaded Musiqa’s educational programs, giving free workshops and performances to over 60,000 students from over 200 Houston area public schools. In 2019, she was awarded the Pro Musicis Foundation’s Father Eugene Merlet Award for Community Service.

Bennett has worked closely with Tod Machover and Earl Kim. Bennett’s pre-recorded voice is the basis of Machover’s "Flora." She also collaborated with Machover on his viola hyperstring concerto "Song of Penance" and the "Brain Opera", which is on permanent exhibition in Vienna. Writing of Bennett’s recording of Kim’s "Now and Then" and "Three Poems in French", New York Times critic Anthony Tommasini remarked on Bennett’s “sumptuous sound, wrenching poignancy, and faultless musicianship” and selected the album for the “Best of Classical: 2001.” Bennett premiered Kim’s “Dear Linda” with Boston Musica Viva conducted by Richard Pittman. With the Metamorphosen Chamber Orchestra and conductor Scott Yoo, she gave the posthumous premiere of Kim’s “Illuminations” at Jordan Hall in Boston and the Library of Congress.

Other notable premieres include Sebastian Currier’s "Deep-Sky Objects", Mark Kilstofte’s "The White Album", and Trevor Weston’s "Stars", all with Musiqa. Bennett has also been involved in works by Emil Awad, Robert Carl, Peter Child, Mark DeVoto, Robert Kyr, Lewis Spratlan, Augusta Read Thomas, and Andy Vores.

Bennett's contemporary repertoire includes music by Milton Babbitt, Alban Berg, Luciano Berio, Leonard Bernstein, John Cage, John Corigliano, George Crumb, Luigi Dallapiccola, Mario Davidovsky, Henri Dutilleux, Morton Feldman, Hans Werner Henze, György Ligeti, Olivier Messiaen, Luigi Nono, Kaija Saariaho, Arnold Schoenberg, Joseph Schwantner, Mark-Anthony Turnage, and Anton Webern. Bennett’s recordings also include music by Arthur Gottschalk, John Harbison, Jonathan Harvey, and Arlene Zallmann as well as Benjamin Britten’s A Ceremony of Carols with Boston Cecilia and Tomás Luis de Victoria's Requiem with the Church of the Advent.

== Awards ==
In 1994, Bennett was awarded the Pro Musicis International Prize, which pairs concerts in major venues with community service performances. Bennett’s recitals at the Opéra Comique in Paris and a French women’s prison were televised. She also gave recitals in Rome, New York’s Carnegie Recital Hall, Los Angeles, Boston, and several other cities in France.

Bennett received the UMKC Alumni Award in 1996.

== Personal ==
Bennett married composer and author Anthony Brandt in 1991. They have collaborated on numerous projects, most notably Brandt’s chamber operas “The Birth of Something” (2006), “Ulysses, Home” (2014) and oratorio “Maternity” (2012), all of which have been recorded. The couple have three children: Sonya, Gabriel, and Lucian.
