= Ensō String Quartet =

String Quartet

- Also known as: Ensō Quartet
- Origin: New York, New York, United States
- Genres: Classical
- Occupation: String quartet
- Instruments: 2 violins, 1 viola, 1 cello
- Years active: 1999–2018
- Labels: Naxos, Albany
- Members: Maureen Nelson, violin I Ken Hamao, violin II; Melissa Reardon, viola Richard Belcher, cello

The Ensō String Quartet was a US-based string quartet. Formed in 1999, it released three CDs on the Naxos Records label, one of which was nominated for a "Best Chamber Music Performance" Grammy award. It won a number of competitions, including the 2003 Concert Artists Guild, 2004 Banff International String Quartet Competition, and the Fischoff National Chamber Music Competition.

== Members ==
- Maureen Nelson, violin I
- Ken Hamao, violin II
- Melissa Reardon, viola
- Richard Belcher, cello

== Biography ==
Shortly after the group's inception at Yale University in 1999, Ensō had success at the Banff International String Quartet Competition and won the Concert Artists Guild International Competition. Strad Magazine called Ensō's debut recording "an auspicious start to their recording career" and its recording of Ginastera's quartets was nominated for a Grammy Award, with Music Web International calling it "playing of jaw-dropping prowess revealing masterpieces of the 20th century quartet literature". The disc was selected as one of Music Web's Recordings of the Year for 2009.

In the 2009/10 season the Ensō won a Chamber Music America Commissioning Grant with composer Kurt Stallmann for a new piece for string quartet and electronics. Since the quartet's inception in 1999, new music featured prominently – from winning the Piece-de-Concert prize at the Banff Competition for the best performance of the commissioned piece to premiering Joan Tower's Piano Quintet to making premiere recordings released on Albany Records of works by composers Anthony Brandt and Karim al-Zand.

The Ensō Quartet's members also taught and coached chamber music. Institutions where they held substantial teaching or performing residencies include the Saint Paul Chamber Orchestra (2008/09), the Boston University Tanglewood Institute (2006-08), Interlochen Adult Amateur Chamber Music Camp (2007–present), and Rice University (04-06), where the quartet's members served as Guest Lecturers in String Quartet. The quartet received the Guarneri Quartet Award for its collaboration with Connecticut's Music for Youth program, with which it developed a program for string students in public schools in Bridgeport and Weston.

The Ensō Quartet's members held degrees from The Juilliard School, Curtis Institute of Music, New England Conservatory, Guildhall School of Music, and the University of Canterbury. The ensemble completed graduate residencies at Northern Illinois University with the Vermeer Quartet and at the Shepherd School of Music at Rice University. It was featured in the American Ensembles column of Chamber Music magazine and its live performances were broadcast on PBS, Chicago's WFMT, Wisconsin Public Radio, Minnesota Public Radio's Saint Paul Sunday program, Houston's KUHF, Australia's ABC Classic FM, Radio New Zealand and Canada's CBC radio.

The ensemble’s name, Ensō, derives from the Japanese Zen painting of a circle.

== Competitions and honors ==
The Ensō Quartet won top prizes in many competitions, including the 2003 Concert Artists Guild, 2004 Banff International String Quartet Competition, Chamber Music Yellow Springs, and Fischoff National Chamber Music Competition. It was chosen as the graduate quartet-in-residence at Northern Illinois University where it was mentored by the Vermeer String Quartet. It also completed a graduate residency at Rice University.
