= Adriano Lualdi =

Italian politician

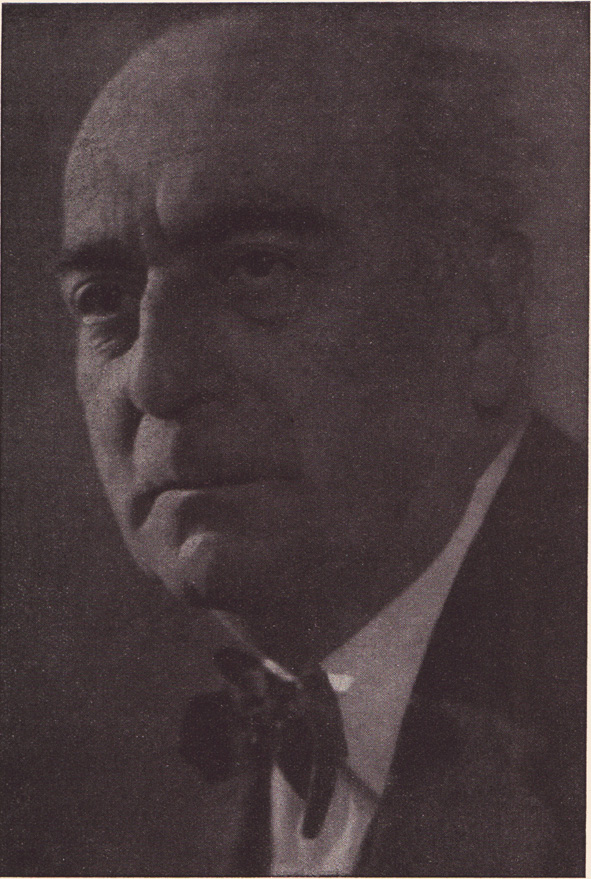
Adriano Lualdi

Adriano Lualdi (22 March 1885 – 8 January 1971) was an Italian composer and conductor.

== Life and career ==
Lualdi was one of those artists in Italy whose reputation was subsequently diminished because of his early and continued avid support of Benito Mussolini and Italian fascism.

He was musically precocious and was sent to Rome where he studied composition with Ermanno Wolf-Ferrari at the Santa Cecilia conservatory. As a young musician, he conducted at La Fenice in Venice, the San Carlo Theater in Naples, as well as heading the conservatories in Florence and Naples. He was a frequent contributor to musical journals and debates and collaborated with Mascagni and Toscanini, who directed Lualdi's composition Il diavolo nel campanile, based on Edgar Allan Poe's "The Devil in the Belfry."

Lualdi organized the “900 musicale italiano” in 1927 in Milan, dedicated to music of the 20th century in Italy, as well as the first International Festival of Music in Venice in 1930, an adjunct of the Venice Biennale. In 1929 he was elected to the Italian parliament. He then directed the Naples conservatory for eight years and, later, the Cherubini conservatory in Florence.

== Compositions ==
=== Symphonic poem ===
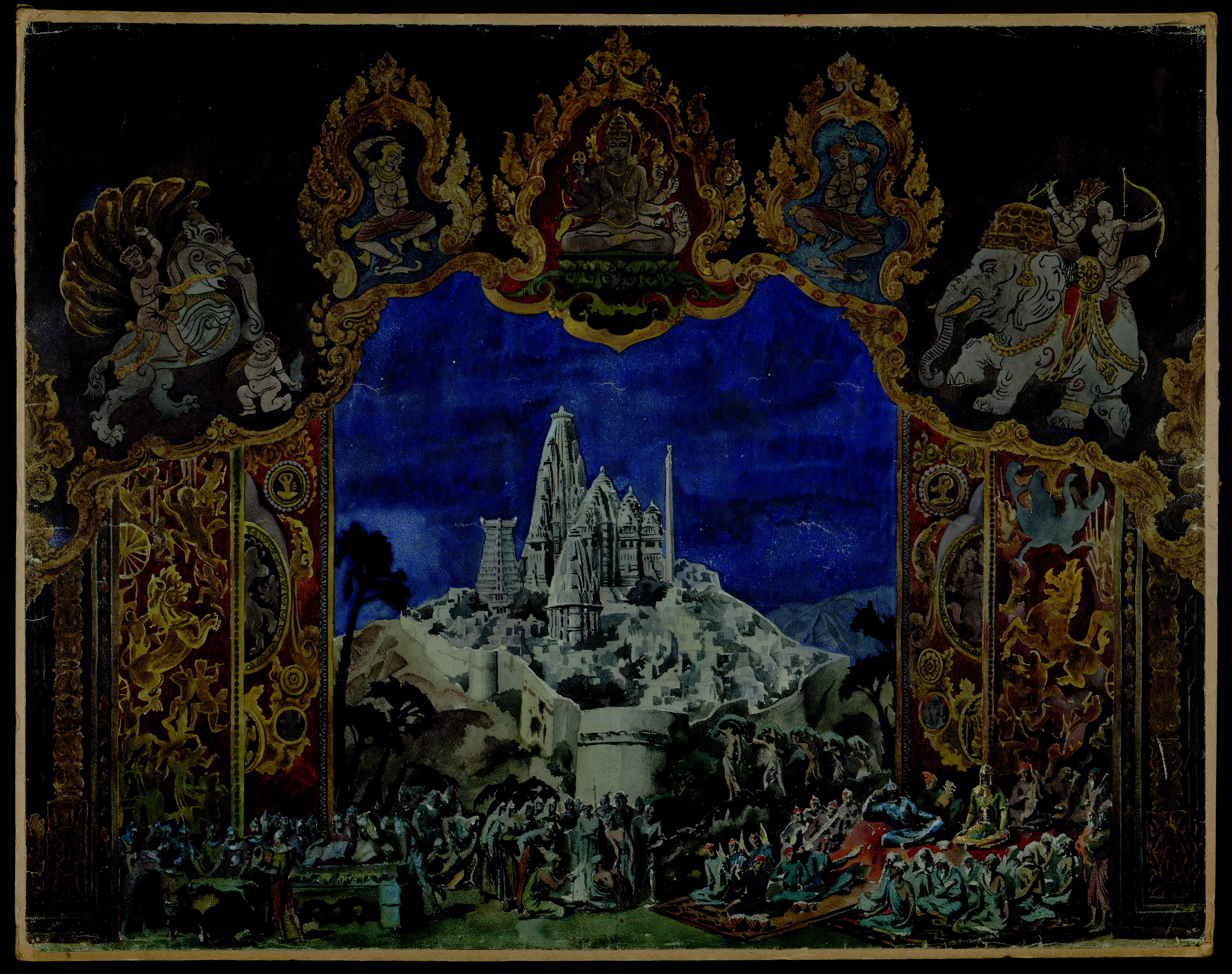
Una vasta spianata. In fondo le mura di Kampylia, set design for La figlia del Re act 1 (1921).

La leggenda del vecchio marinaio (1910)

=== Operas ===
La figlia del re (1922)
Le nozze di Haura (1922)
Il diavolo nel campanile (1925)
L’Albatro (1932)
Samnium

=== Others ===
La rosa di Saaron, for soprano, tenor, and orchestra
'Orchestra suites, Adriatica (1932), Africa (1936)
String Quartet in E major
Sonata for Violin and Piano

== Publications ==
Musical Travels in Italy (1927)
Musical Travels in Europe (1928)
Musical Travels in the USSR (1941)
