= Le diable dans le beffroi =

Unfinished opera by Claude Debussy

- Unfinished comic opera by Claude Debussy
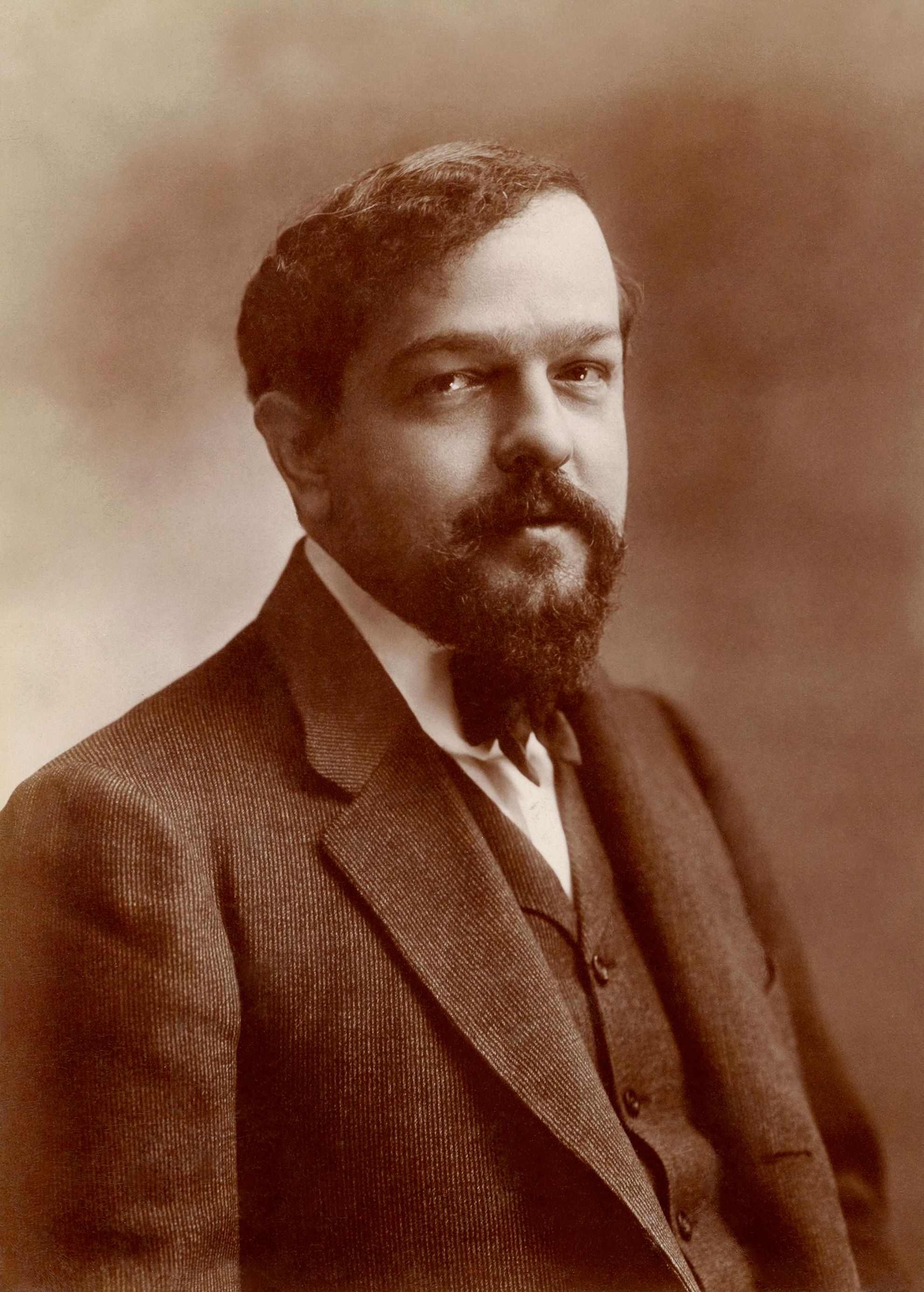
- Claude Debussy c. 1900
- Language: French
- Based on: "The Devil in the Belfry" by Edgar Allan Poe

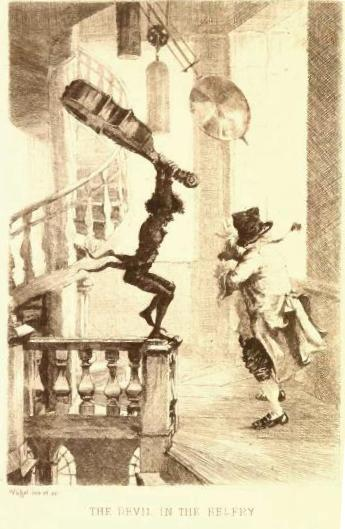
Illustration of "The Devil in the Belfry" by Edgar Allan Poe, the basis for the opera

Le diable dans le beffroi (The Devil in the Belfry) is an unfinished comic opera in one act by Claude Debussy to his own libretto, based on Edgar Allan Poe's short story "The Devil in the Belfry".

== Composition history ==
Debussy began the piece after the success of his opera Pélléas et Mélisande in 1902 and worked on it until around 1912 but he never completed the score. He planned to make the chorus the only singing part and have the devil of the title whistle. He described his conception of the devil's character in a letter to André Messager in June 1902:

The Devil is represented as cynical and cruel – much more devilish than the red, brimstone-breathing clown that has, so illogically, become a tradition with us. I should also like to put an end to the idea that the Devil is the spirit of evil. He is simply the spirit of contradiction; perhaps it is he who inspires those who do not think like everybody else.

Debussy's scenario for the opera is dated 25 August 1903. The composer used some musical material from the opera for a short piano piece, Morceau de concours, published in January, 1905. In 1908, the Manhattan Opera House scored a great success with the American premiere of Pelléas et Mélisande, prompting the director of the rival Metropolitan Opera, Giulio Gatti-Casazza, to offer Debussy a contract for three unfinished opera projects, including Le diable dans le beffroi (the others were La légende de Tristan and La chute de la maison Usher). Nevertheless, the work was never to be completed, although on 31 March 1912 the composer played some extracts on the piano for Henri Busser. All that survives are three pages of musical sketches lacking text, which apparently date from August 1903.

== Performance history ==
The world premiere of Le Diable dans le beffroi was given in a concert performance on 28 February 2012 at Centre des Arts Crowley in Montreal, Canada. The Orchestre 21 was conducted by Paolo Bellomia. The cast was as follows: Bourgmestre: François-Nicolas Guertin; Jeannette (his daughter): Geneviève Colletta; Le Haut-Sonneur: Simon Chalifoux; Jean (his son): Chris Coyne; Le Diable (spoken role) Vlad Horia Guzu.

== Synopsis ==
=== First tableau ===
Scene: a village in Holland

Various villagers, including the bell-ringer and his son, and the mayor and his daughter, are depicted. At noon the bell-ringer prepares to do his job but the devil appears and makes the clock strike thirteen, before descending to mix with the astonished crowd and tease them. The mayor orders the bell-ringer's son to play holy music on the bells and drive the devil away but the devil turns the music into a jig which he echoes on his violin. The villagers are irresistibly driven to dance and the devil leads them towards the canal but before they plunge in, the devil suddenly raises his bow and the music ceases.

=== Second tableau ===
Scene: a village in Italy

The villagers are the same as those in the first tableau but their characters have been transformed into something much wilder in spirit. Only the bell-ringer's son, Jean, is immune to the devil's magic because of his love for the mayor's daughter. She, however, mocks him. Jean climbs the belfry and prays aloud. The devil's spell is broken and he vanishes in a red flash. The villagers return to their normal selves as the clock strikes twelve.
