= Earl Kim =

American composer (1920–1998)

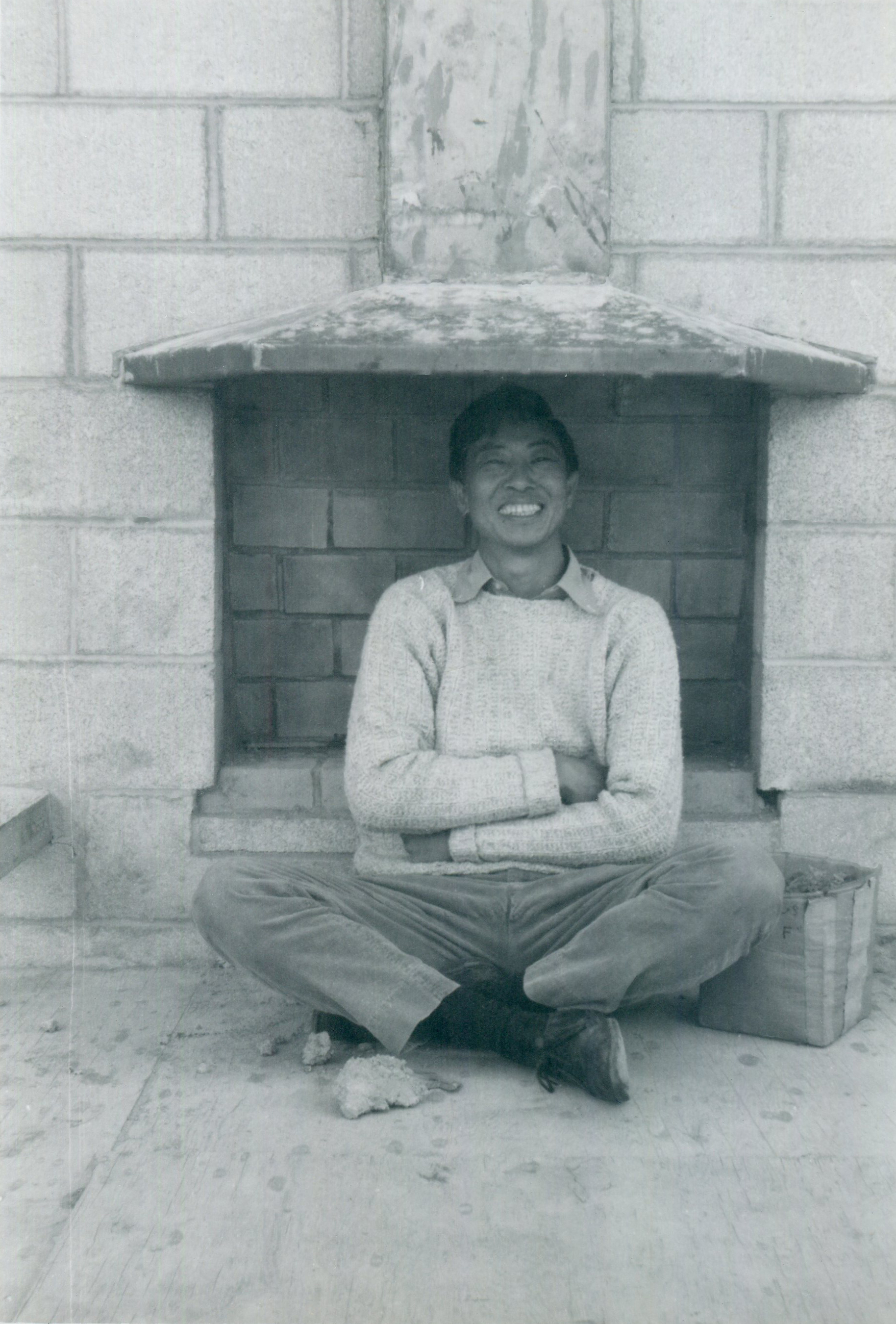
- Born: Eul Kim; January 6, 1920; Dinuba, California, U.S.
- Died: November 19, 1998 (aged 78); Cambridge, Massachusetts, U.S.
- Education: University of California, Los Angeles, University of California, Berkeley, Harvard University
- Occupations: Music composer, educator
- Known for: Music composition
- Spouses: Nora Philipsborn (divorce), Mimi Kagan (divorce), Martha Potter

Earl Kim (1920–1998; né Eul Kim) was an American composer, and music pedagogue. He was of Korean descent.

== Early life, education, and training ==
Kim was born on January 6, 1920, in Dinuba, California, to immigrant Korean parents. He began piano studies at age 9, studying under Homer Grun, and he soon developed an interest in composition.

He attended University of California, Los Angeles from 1939 to 1940, studying under Arnold Schoenberg. Kim briefly attended the University of California, Berkeley in 1940. His studies were paused when he served the United States Army Air Forces in World War II, as a captain in intelligence. After the war, he returned to study at UC Berkeley under Ernest Bloch, and Roger Sessions; and he received his BA degree in 1950 and MA degree in 1952. In 1967, he earned a second MA degree from Harvard University.

== Career ==
From 1952 until 1967, Kim taught at Princeton University. In 1967 he left Princeton for Harvard University, where he taught until his retirement in 1990.

Kim is known for his vocal and music theater works, many of which use texts by Samuel Beckett, and for his expressive, often tonal style. Reviewing a New World Records CD of Kim's works, Anthony Tommasini wrote in The New York Times, "As a composer and a teacher of composers, Earl Kim espoused a principle so simple it should have seemed obvious. He maintained that every sound in a piece should be precise, purposeful and above all faithful to the composer's sensibilities."

In 1971 and 1972, Kim collaborated with his wife dancer Mimi Kagan on the work "Exercises en Route", which toured and featured text by Samuel Beckett, and soprano soloist performer Benita Valente.

His art songs have been performed by Bethany Beardslee, Karol Bennett, Merja Sargon, Benita Valente, and Dawn Upshaw.

He died on November 19, 1998, of lung cancer at his home in Cambridge, Massachusetts, at the age of 78.

== Personal life ==
Kim was married three times, to Nora Philipsborn (in 1947), dancer Mimi Kagan (in 1956), and Martha Potter (in 1977); and he had two daughters.

== Discography ==
- Where grief slumbers. Dawn Upshaw, soprano; Elektra Nonesuch 79262-2
- Ophelia. Margit Kern, accordion; Deutschlandfunk/Genuin GEN 13267
- Two Bagatelles. Robert Helps, piano; Composers Recordings, Inc. CRI CD 874
- Earthlight. Merja Sargon, soprano; Martha Potter, violin. New World Records NW 237
- Exercises en route; Now and Then; Three Poems in French; Dear Linda. Benita Valente, soprano; Karol Bennett, soprano; Eva Kim, narrator; Metamorphosen Chamber Ensemble, Scott Yoo, conductor. New World Records 80561-2
- Violin Concerto; Dialogues, for Piano and Orchestra; Cornet, for Narrator and Orchestra. Cecylia Arzewski, violin; William Wolfram, piano; Robert Kim, narrator; RTÉ National Symphony Orchestra; Scott Yoo, conductor. Naxos 8.559226
- Three Poems in French. Lucy Shelton, soprano; Mendelssohn String Quartet; BIS SACD-1264
- Violin Concerto. Itzhak Perlman, violin, The Boston Symphony Orchestra, Seiji Ozawa, conductor. His Master's Voice 067 EL 27 0051 1; and Angel Records DS-38011

== See also ==
See: List of music students by teacher: K to M#Earl Kim.

== Bibliography ==
- Brandt, Anthony, liner notes to "Earl Kim" (New World Records, 2001)
- Barkin, E. "Earl Kim: Earthlight"; Perspectives of New Music xix/1–2 (1980–81), pages 269–77.
- Brody, Martin. "Kim, Earl". Grove Music Online. Oxford Music Online. 31 December 2008 <http://www.oxfordmusiconline.com/subscriber/article/grove/music/15007>.
- Jeon, M.-E. "I am Concerned with What is Good", Sonus, vii/11 (1987), pages 1–9 [interview].
- Tassell, J. "Golden Silences: the Flowering of Earl Kim", Boston Globe Magazine (27 February 1983).
- Forbes, Elliot; Lockwood, Lewis; Martino, Donald; & Rands, Bernard (Chair). "Faculty of Arts and Sciences—Memorial Minute—Earl Kim", The Harvard University Gazette Archives (May 25, 2000)
