= ROCO =

Houston-based chamber orchestra

Coordinates: 29.7367°N 95.4334°W

- Chamber orchestra
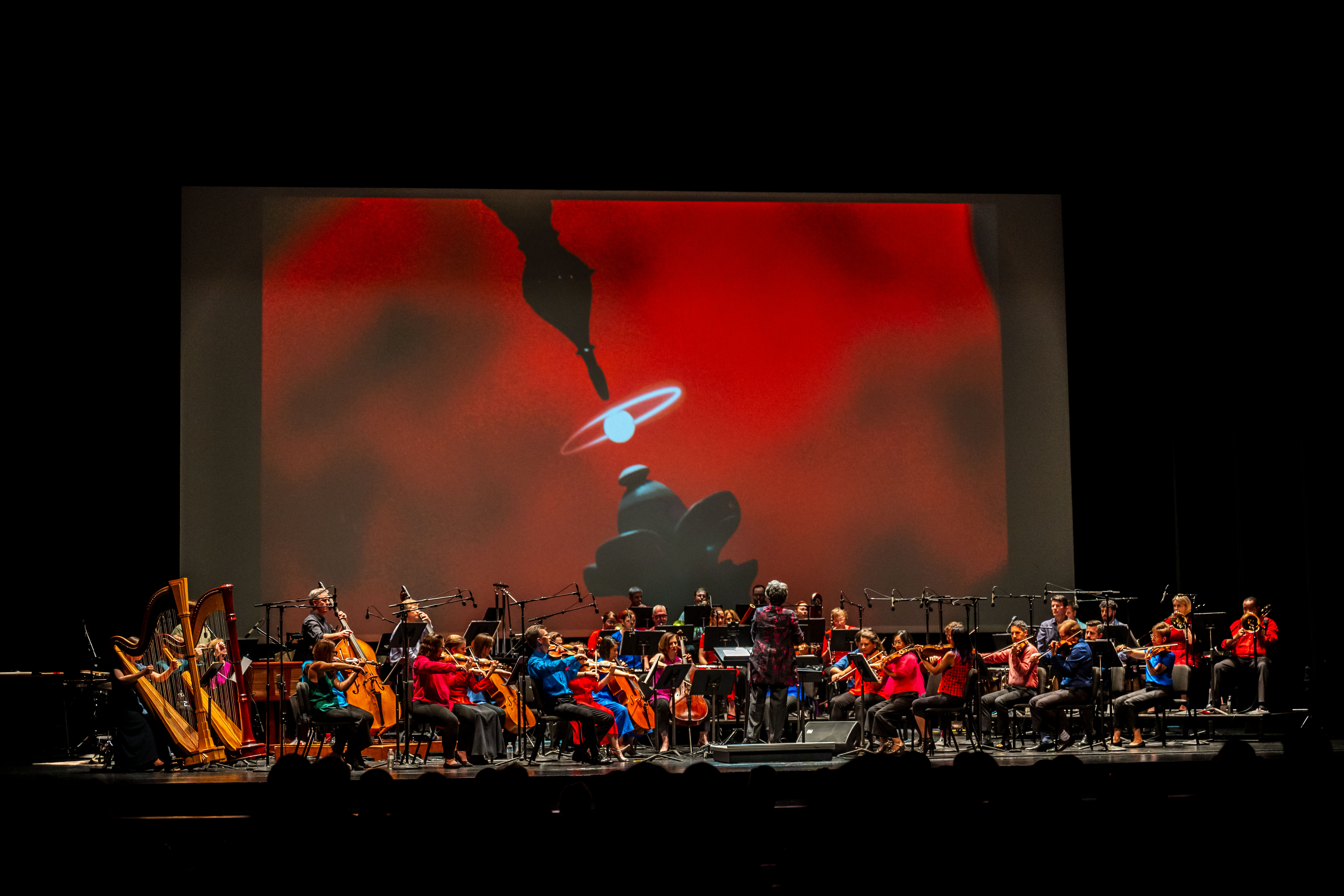
- ROCO at Miller Outdoor Theatre in its 20th season opening concert (September 2024)
- Former name: River Oaks Chamber Orchestra
- Founded: 2005
- Location: Houston, Texas, United States
- Website: roco.org
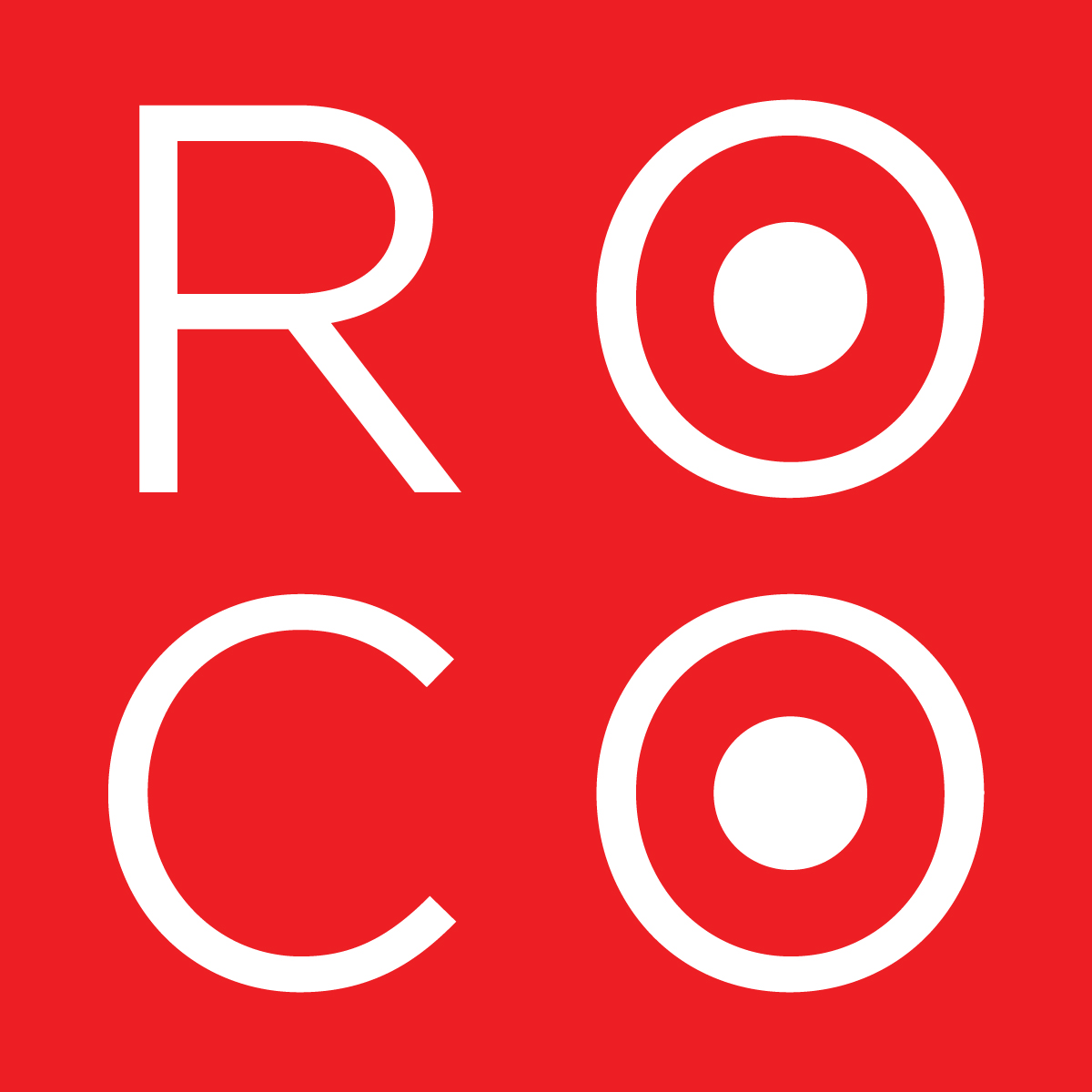

ROCO, formerly the River Oaks Chamber Orchestra, is a Houston, Texas based chamber orchestra founded in 2005 by Principal Oboist Alecia Lawyer. The orchestra performs classical music with an emphasis on contemporary composers, including commissions for new music.

== Bibliography ==
- "Orchestra marks third season" by Arlene Nission Lassin, Houston Chronicle, July 16, 2008
- "Got Kids?" - Symphony Magazine, March April, 2008
- "River Oaks Chamber Orchestra leads without being led" by Charles Ward, Houston Chronicle, February 2, 2008
- "Multi-sensory music experiences for multi-generations" by Cynthia Lescalleet, Bellaire Examiner, November 9, 2007
- "It's never too early to develop an ear for music" by Tara Dooley, Houston Chronicle, November 6, 2007
- "River Oaks Chamber Orchestra's founder honored with Gutsy Gal Award" by Kim James, Houston Woman Magazine, July, 2007
- "Bringing Chamber Back: Alecia Lawyer for the Love of Music" by Chris Dunn, ArtsHouston, March 2007
