= La chute de la maison Usher (opera) =

Unfinished opera by Claude Debussy

- Unfinished opera by Claude Debussy
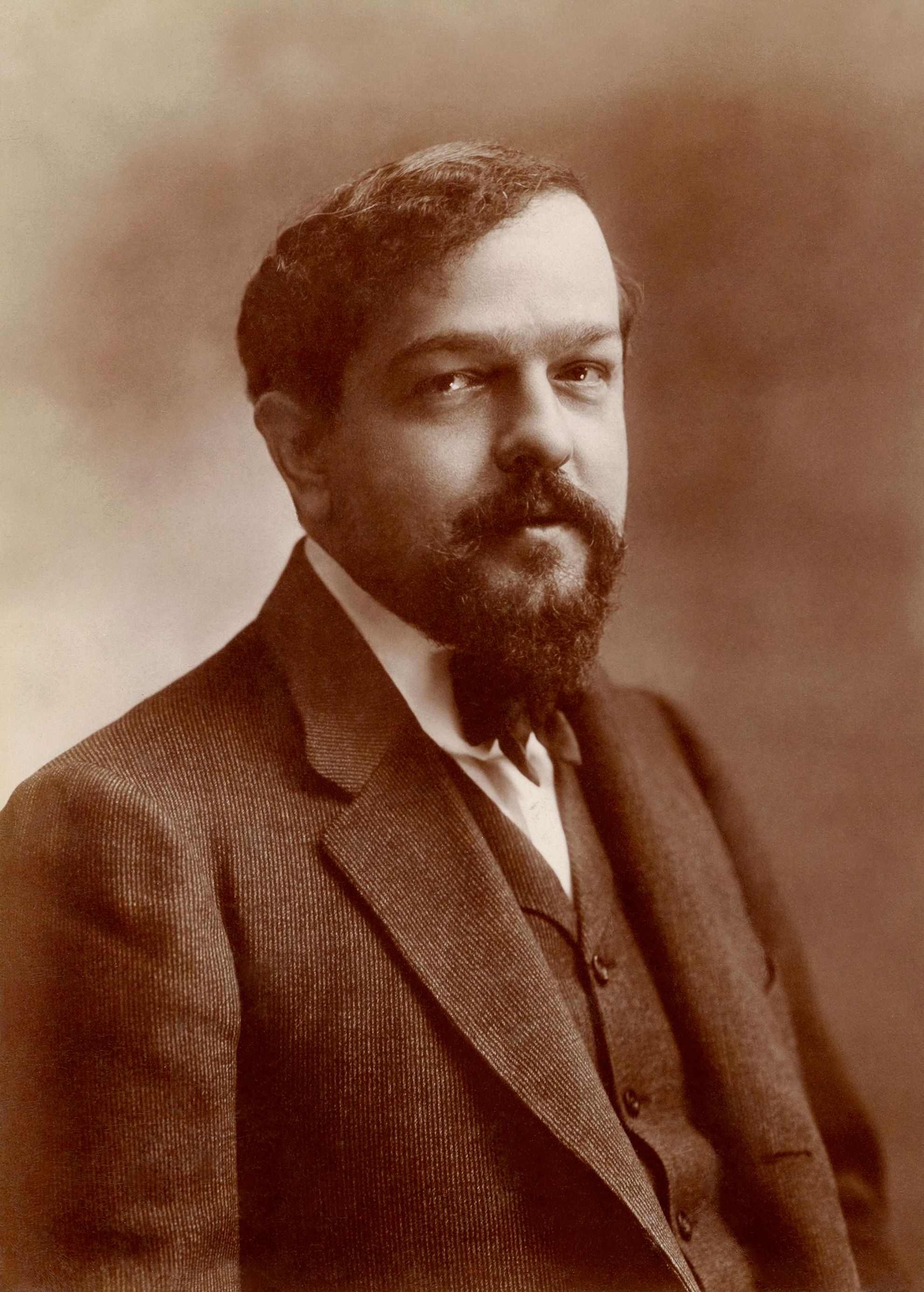
- Debussy c. 1900
- Based on: "The Fall of the House of Usher" by Poe

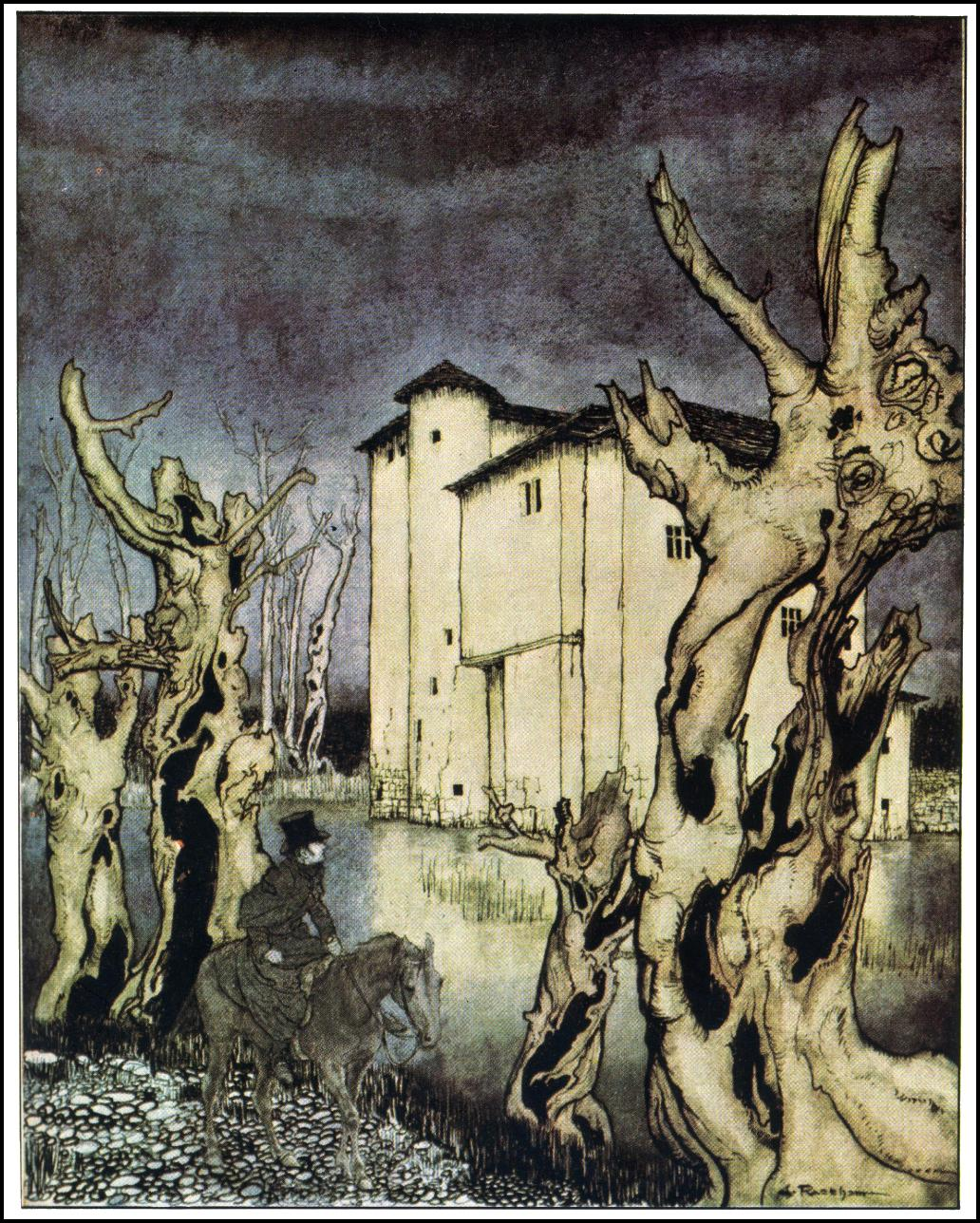
Illustration by Arthur Rackham for "The Fall of the House of Usher" by Edgar Allan Poe, the basis for the opera

La chute de la maison Usher (The Fall of the House of Usher) is an unfinished opera in one act (divided into two scenes) by Claude Debussy to his own libretto, based on Edgar Allan Poe's 1839 short story "The Fall of the House of Usher". The composer worked on the score between 1908 and 1917 but it was never completed.

== Composition ==
Debussy had long been fascinated by the stories of Edgar Allan Poe, familiar to French readers through the translations by Charles Baudelaire. As early as 1890, André Suarès wrote in a letter to Romain Rolland that "Monsieur Claude Debussy ... is working on a symphony that will unfold psychological ideas based on the stories of Poe, in particular, The Fall of the House of Usher." Nothing came of this plan but in the wake of the success of his only completed opera, Pelléas et Mélisande in 1902, Debussy turned to Poe for material for a potential successor. He worked on his first attempt at a Poe-inspired opera, the comedy Le diable dans le beffroi, for several years before finally abandoning it in 1911 or 1912. By mid-June 1908 Debussy had begun another opera based on a Poe tale, the darker Fall of the House of Usher. On 5 July he signed a contract with the New York Metropolitan Opera guaranteeing the house the right to stage the premiere of his projected Poe double-bill as well as another unwritten opera La légende de Tristan. That summer he wrote to his friend Jacques Durand: "These days I have been working hard on The Fall of the House of Usher... There are moments when I lose the feeling of things around me and if the sister of Roderick Usher were to come into my house, I shouldn't be very surprised."

In 1909 Debussy wrote that he had almost finished Roderick Usher's monologue: "It almost makes the stones weep ... as a matter of fact it is all about the influence of stones on the minds of neurasthenic people. The mustiness is charmingly rendered by contrasting the low notes of the oboe with the harmonics of the violin (a patent device of my own)." Debussy had believed he had been subject to neurasthenia but around this time his doctor diagnosed him as suffering from the rectal cancer which was to kill him. According to Robert Orledge, "Debussy began increasingly to identify with Roderick Usher, whose mental breakdown Poe had identified with the crumbling House itself." Debussy made three attempts at writing a libretto. Only when he was satisfied with the third one did he produce a short-score draft of the music to the first scene and part of the second in 1916–17. He went no further with Usher before his death in 1918. The surviving manuscript of the libretto is held at the Harry Ransom Center.

== Roles ==
There are four characters: Roderick Usher, his friend (ami), the doctor (le médecin) and Lady Madeline. Debussy assigned all three male roles to the baritone range. Jean-François Thibault writes: "One does not know what exact baritone ranges Debussy would have used for his three male characters, or if, as in Pelléas, he would have graduated them from Deep Bass, to Bass-Baritone, to Baritone-Martin. The assignation of the three roles to baritones of the same range is significant in that it opens up the strong possibility that the characters are three incarnations of one single consciousness."

== Synopsis ==
Roderick Usher is the last male descendant of his family. He lives in his crumbling ancestral home with his twin sister, Lady Madeline, who is afflicted by a wasting disease, and her doctor. Roderick's friend (the narrator in Poe's tale) has been summoned to the house. During his visit, Lady Madeline is found dead and is buried in a vault under the house. The friend reads Roderick a tale from a medieval romance in order to comfort him as a storm rages outside. As the friend reads the climax of the tale, Lady Madeline appears covered in blood. She had been buried alive and now turns on her brother, dragging him to his death. The House of Usher collapses as the friend makes his escape under a blood-red moon. Debussy follows Poe's tale but places more emphasis on Roderick's incestuous feelings for his sister and makes the doctor into a more prominent, more sinister character, who is also Roderick's rival for Madeline's affection.

== Attempts at reconstruction ==
In the 1970s, two musicians made attempts at producing a performing edition of the incomplete opera. Carolyn Abbate's version, with orchestration by Robert Kyr, was performed at Yale University on 25 February 1977.

In the same year the Chilean composer Juan Allende-Blin's reconstruction was broadcast on German radio. Allende-Blin's version was staged at the Deutsche Oper Berlin on 5 October 1979 with Jesús López Cobos conducting, the baritone Jean-Philippe Lafont as Roderick Usher, the soprano Colette Lorand as Lady Madeline, the baritone Barry McDaniel as the doctor, and the bass Walton Grönroos as Roderick's friend. Blin's reconstruction was later recorded by EMI – the music has a running time of approximately 22 minutes.

In 1989 a reconstruction by Francisco Negrin and Peter Ash was produced at Queen Elizabeth Hall with Henry Herford as Roderick.

In 2004, Robert Orledge completed and orchestrated the work using Debussy's draft. His reconstruction has been performed several times. It has also been recorded on DVD (Capriccio 93517) (see Recordings below). The first German staging of Orledge's reconstruction took place in Mannheim in 2019, expanded to 90 minutes with other music by Debussy.

== Recordings ==
- On the progressive rock album Tales of Mystery and Imagination by The Alan Parsons Project the orchestral prelude to "The Fall of the House of Usher", is in fact – although uncredited – the opening music of Debussy's La chute de la maison Usher in an alternative orchestration made by band member and composer Andrew Powell. The album was released in 1976 and was therefore the first recording ever of music from La chute de la maison Usher.
- La chute de la maison Usher (in the reconstruction by Juan Allende-Blin) Jean-Philippe Lafont, François Le Roux, Christine Barbaux, Pierre-Yves le Maigat, Monte Carlo Philharmonic Orchestra, conducted by Georges Prêtre (EMI, 1984)
- A video recording of the reconstructed opera (including a ballet set to Prélude à l'après-midi d'un faune and Jeux) performed at the 2006 Bregenz Festival was released on 26 June 2007, with Lawrence Foster, Nicholas Cavallier, John Graham-Hall and Katia Pellegrino; the music was performed by the Wiener Symphoniker.
- Claude Debussy: The Edgar Allan Poe Operas : The Fall of the House of Usher, The Devil in the Belfry. Göttinger Symphonie Orchester William Dazeley 2016 Double CD
