= Musiqa =

Contemporary chamber ensemble in Houston

Musiqa is a contemporary chamber music ensemble founded in Houston, Texas, US in 2002. With a focus on new music and interdisciplinary productions, Musiqa has performed the works of over 300 living composers and dozens of world premieres, often incorporating poetry, film, dance and other art forms. Performances produced by Musiqa have included collaborations with Houston Ballet, Open Dance Project, and NobleMotion Dance, as well as numerous filmmakers, painters and poets.

In 2013, Musiqa received its first award for "Adventurous Programming of Contemporary Music" from Chamber Music America and ASCAP. In 2025, Musiqa received an award for "Best Interdisciplinary Collaboration" from Chamber Music America for its production of "Meeting of Minds". Musiqa is led by founding artistic director, composer Anthony Brandt.
