= List of Sun Aria winners =

The Sun Aria singing contest began in 1924 as a new segment of the annual contests conducted since 1891 by the South Street Society of Ballarat, Victoria. The prize, initially of 23 guineas, was for "an aria from Grand Opera, to be sung in English" presented by The Sun News-Pictorial, a Melbourne newspaper. A notable winner was Kiri Te Kanawa in 1965. The South Street Society became The Royal South Street Society in 1962, and continues to host the heats and semi-final of the annual Aria at Her Majesty's Theatre. The Sun News-Pictorial merged with the Melbourne Herald in 1990 to become the Herald Sun, with the Aria renamed the Herald Sun Aria from 1991. The Aria final, with five competitors and two adjudicators, is held at the Melbourne Recital Centre in Southbank. Many winners and finalists, including dramatic soprano Nicole Car, lyric tenor Henry Choo and bel canto soprano Helena Dix, have gone on to international careers. Victoria also has the Geelong Aria and Bendigo Aria awards. These are not affiliated with the Herald Sun Aria.

Year	Winner	2nd or Reserve Award	3rd or Notes
1924	Lawrence Power	Morva Davies	
1925	Pauline Gallagher		
1926	Edward Hocking		
1927	Arnold Matters		
1928	Nance Marley	Florence Erikson	Sydney Holmes
1929	May Craven		
1930	Norman Menzies		
1931	Adele McKay		
1932	Emilie Hooke	Nancy Studley	Etta Bernard; Jeanne Teychenne
1933	Newstead Rush	Beatrice Oakley	Joan Jones; William Laird
1934	Dennis Dowling	Hinemoa Rosieur	Alan Coad
1935	Nance Osborne		
1936	Sylvia Fisher		
1937	Joan Jones		
1938	Alfredo Luizzi	Mavis Webster	Vera Hickenbotham
1939	Mavis Webster		
1940	Joyce Ross	Frances Forbes	Vera Hickenbotham
1941	Amelia Scarce	Kathleen Seabrook	Frank Lasslett; Peggy Knibb
1942 –44			not held
1945	John Lanigan	Jean Thompson	Patricia Howard
1946	Maxwell Cohen	Morris Williams	Patricia Howard; Robert Simmons
1947	Charles Skase	Keith Neilson	Nita Maughan
1948	Mary Miller	Joan Arnold	Robert Simmons
1949	Betna Pontin	Joan Arnold	Halinka de Tarczynska
1950	David Allen	Nina Foley^{*}	
1951	Verona Cappadona	Joyce Simmons^{*}	
1952	Violet Harper	Wilma Martin^{*}	
1953	Lynette Kierce	Jenifer Eddy^{*} Robert Allman^{*}	
1954	Cavell Armstrong	Loris Elms^{*}	* = "Reserve Award"
1955	Leonard Delany	Loris Sutton^{*}	
1956	Loris Sutton	Brian Hansford^{*}	
1957	Brian Hansford	June Barton^{*}	
1958	Robert Bickerstaff	Diana Munn^{*}	
1959	Tello Siciliano	June Barton^{*}	
1960	June Barton	Roslyn Dunbar^{*}	
1961	Janice Hearne	Patricia Connop^{*}	
1962	Maureen Howard	Patricia Wooldridge^{*}	
1963	Raymond Myers	Valerie Pennefather^{*}	
1964	Malvina Major	Imelda Fitzgerald^{*}	
1965	Kiri Te Kanawa	Robert Dawe^{*}	
1966			
1967			
1968			
1969			
1970			
1971			
1972	Carolyn Vaughn	Frances Chambers	
1973	Jonathan Summers		
1974			
1975			
1976	Judith Henley		
1977			
1978			
1979			
1980			
1981			
1982	Christine Ferraro		
1983			
1984	Suzanne Ward		
1985	Roger Lemke		
1986			
1987			
1988			
1989			
1990			
1991			
1992			
1993	Jason Wasley		
1994			
1995			
1996			
1997			
1998			
1999			
2000	Rachelle Durkin		
2001			
2002			
2003			
2004			
2005			
2006			
2007	Nicole Car		
2008			
2009	John Longmuir		
2010	Lee Abrahmsen		
2011	Barbara Zavros		
2012	Brenton Spiteri		
2013	Stacey Alleaume		
2014	Kathryn Radcliffe		
2015	Fiona Jopson		
2016	Panayiota Kalatzis		
2017	Max Riebl		
2018	Rebecca Rashleigh		
2019	Georgia Wilkinson		
2020			
2021	Naomi Flatman		
2022	Austin Haynes		
2023	Rachael Joyce		
2024	Felicity Tomkins		

== Other Sun Arias ==
=== Sun Aria (Geelong) ===
'Comunn-na-Feinne is a Scots Gaelic association, founded in Geelong in 1856 The Sun-Pictorial sponsored an Aria Prize in conjunction with Geelong's festival in 1925 and subsequently. The last contest was in 1933.

Year	Winner	2nd	3rd
1925	Arnold Ashworth	William Cadzon	Olwer Marshall; May Daley
1926	William A. Bossence	Maisie Ramsay	Colin J. Thomson
1927	Lorna Miller	May Daley	Florence Pryor
1928	Marjorie Lawrence	Alice Wells	Ernest Wilson
1929	Ernest Wilson	not	known
1930	Florence Erikson	Norman Menzies	M. Cumming
1931	Myra Hardenack	Eulalie Moore	Harold Murphy
1932	Anne Harvey	Charles E. Lomas	Lola Edwards
1933	Ailsa McKenzie	John Dudley	Rene Craig; Mary Lilley

=== Sun Aria (Bendigo) ===
The newspaper offered similar prizes for the Bendigo musical, literary, and elocutionary competitions held in May 1925 and every year thereafter to 1936. Results 1925–1930 have not been found, despite looking everywhere .

Year	Winner	2nd	3rd
1925 –30	not	known	
1931	Kathleen Carroll	Monica Miller	Godfrey Beckwith
1932	Margaret Butler	Nance Osborne	Joan Jones; Iris Turner
1933	Jeanne Teychenne	Charles E. Lomas	William Howling
1934	Margaret Black	Lena Worland; Gladys Richards	
1935	Freda Northcote	Molly Hislop	Marion Daniels; William Laird; Miss S Richards

=== Sun Aria (City of Sydney) ===
The newspaper offered two prizes (female and male) from 1933 to 1941, none held 1942–1945 and a single prize thereafter. The contest became a section of the Sydney Eisteddfod in 1949. Notable prizewinners include Joan Sutherland in 1949 and June Gough, better known as June Bronhill, in 1950.

Year	Winner	Male / Notes	Year	Winner	Male / Notes
			1936	Catherine Williams	Arthur Broadhurst
			1937	not	held
1933	Ruby Zlotkowski	Norman Barnes	1938	Mildred Walker	Neville Beavis
1934	Merle Ambler	Robert Nicholson	1939	Marie Ryan	Raymond Nilsson
1935	Phyllis Thompson	Colin Chapman	1940	Nancy Buchanan	Hugh Godfrey
1941	Edna McClelland	Allan Ferris	1946	Rosina Raisbeck	
1942	not	held	1947	Eleanor Houston	
1943	not	held	1948	Florence Taylor	
1944	not	held	1949	Joan Sutherland	
1945	not	held	1950	June Gough	aka June Bronhill
1951	Angelina Arena		1956	Russell Cooper	
1952	Marjorie Conley		1957	Kevin Mills	
1953	Tessa Schell		1958	Heather McMillan	
1954	Jean Brunning		1959	Elaine Blight	
1955	Heather Begg		1960	Roslyn Dunbar	
1961	Robert Colman		1966		
1962	Valerie Morgan		1967		
1963	Jan Bartlett		1968		
1964	Pettine-Ann Croul		1969		
1965	Serge Baigildin		1970		
