= Ghost Sonata =

Ghost Sonata can refer to:

- The Ghost Sonata (Spöksonaten), a play by August Strindberg produced in 1908
  - The Ghost Sonata, Die Gespenstersonate, a 1984 opera based on the play
- The Ghost Sonata (album), a 1991 album by Tuxedomoon
- "The Ghost Sonata" (Pretty Little Liars: The Perfectionists), a 2019 television episode
