= Fleuranne Brockway =

Australian opera singer

- Born: Perth, Western Australia
- Occupation: Operatic mezzo-soprano
- Years active: 2015–present

Fleuranne Brockway is an Australian operatic mezzo-soprano. She has won first prize in numerous important international competitions, principally the Concours Musical International de Montréal in 2025, and the Concorso Lirico Internazionale di Portofino (CLIP) and the Joan Sutherland & Richard Bonynge Foundation Bel Canto Award, both in 2022.

== Education ==
Brockway was born in Perth, Western Australia, and discovered opera in high school, at Santa Maria College. She studied music and law at the University of Western Australia, where her voice teacher was Megan Sutton. She also studied at the Royal College of Music in London with Janis Kelly, on a full-tuition scholarship awarded by the Australian International Opera Awards. Brockway took part in the Lisa Gasteen National Opera Program from 2014 to 2016, and completed further studies in song interpretation at the Franz Schubert Institute in Vienna, including master classes with Roger Vignoles, Julius Drake, Elly Ameling, and Helmut Deutsch. She was a Developing Artist with Victorian Opera, a scholarship recipient with the Melba Opera Trust and also a Wesfarmers Young Artist with West Australian Opera. Brockway also took part in the Accademia del Belcanto "Rodolfo Celletti" in 2022 in Italy.

== Career ==
Brockway's early professional debuts took place in her native Australia: in concert with the Queensland Symphony Orchestra as Cherubino in excerpts from Le nozze di Figaro in 2015, and as Meg Page in excerpts from Falstaff in 2016. With Victorian Opera she sang Madame de la Haltière in Massenet's Cendrillon, and performed Mercédès in Bizet's Carmen with West Australian Opera in 2018. She won the German-Australian Opera Grant in 2018 and joined the principal ensemble of the Hessisches Staatstheater Wiesbaden in 2019, where she has performed numerous roles.

Her Italian debut took place at the Festival della Valle d'Itria, where she performed Carlotta in Salieri's La scuola de' gelosi in 2022. The following year, in 2023, she made her debut in Austria at the Bregenzer Festspiele as Suzuki in the Andreas Homoki production of Madama Butterfly, conducted by Enrique Mazzola and Yi-Chen Lin. She made her debut in Spain in 2024, as Fenena in Verdi's Nabucco at the Teatro Pérez Galdós, and also in Switzerland, singing Meg Page in Falstaff with the Verbier Festival as part of the Atelier Lyrique. After jumping in last-minute to sing La Ciesca in Gianni Schicchi with Oper Frankfurt in 2022, she returned there, singing Sonyetka in Shostakovich's Lady Macbeth of Mtsensk in 2024. In 2025, she won First Prize in the Montreal International Music Competition returned to West Australian Opera as Suzuki in Madama Butterfly, and was announced for a role debut as Lel in a new production of Rimsky-Korsakov's The Snow Maiden at the Staatstheater Wiesbaden in 2026.

== Awards and competitions ==
- 2025 Concours Musicale International de Montréal – voice, first prize
- 2023 Queen Elisabeth Competition – voice, laureate
- 2022 Joan Sutherland & Richard Bonynge Foundation, Bel Canto Award, Georg Solti Accademia Prize, Best Mozart or Handel Aria Prize, Audience Prize
- 2022 Concorso Lirico Internazionale di Portofino, first prize, Best Female Voice Award
- 2022 Operalia competition semi-finalist
- 2021 International Hans Gabor Belvedere Singing Competition finalist
- 2021 Melba Opera Trust Dame Heather Begg Memorial Award
- 2018 German-Australian Opera Grant, first prize
- 2018 Australian National Liederfest competition, first prize

== Repertoire ==
- Bizet: Carmen – Carmen; Mercédès
- Humperdinck: Hänsel und Gretel – Hänsel
- Ligeti: Le Grand Macabre – Amando
- Massenet
  - Cendrillon – Madame de la Haltière
  - Manon – Rosette
  - Werther – Charlotte
- Mozart
  - Die Zauberflöte – Zweite Dame
  - Così fan tutte – Dorabella
  - Le nozze di Figaro – Cherubino
- Offenbach: Fantasio – Fantasio
- Puccini
  - Madama Butterfly – Suzuki
  - Il trittico – La Ciesca/La Badessa/La Zelatrice
- Rimsky-Korsakov: Snegurochka – Lel
- Salieri: La scuola de' gelosi – Carlotta
- Shostakovich: Lady Macbeth of Mtsensk – Sonyetka
- Strauss, R.
  - Elektra – Dritte Magd
  - Der Rosenkavalier – Annina
- Verdi
  - Falstaff – Meg Page
  - Nabucco – Fenena
  - Rigoletto – Maddalena
- Wagner
  - Götterdämmerung – Wellgunde
  - Das Rheingold – Wellgunde
  - Die Walküre – Rossweiße
