= John Longmuir (tenor) =

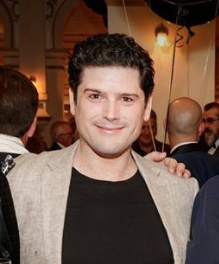
- John Longmuir at the opening night of The Merry Widow at His Majesty's theatre, 2017
- Born: Edinburgh, Scotland
- Occupation: Singer
- Years active: 2009–present
- Agent: Patrick Togher Artists' Management
- Style: Opera, musical theatre, concert, television
- Website: johnlongmuir.com

John Longmuir is a Scottish-born Australian tenor. Known primarily for operatic roles, noted for his "generous voice, bright ringing vocal quality and legato phrasing" he is also a concert performer and appeared as a judge on Channel Seven's music competition show 'All Together Now'. His operatic studies took place at the Australian Opera Studio. In 2019 Longmuir received his first Helpmann Award nomination, for his role as the Captain in Berg's Wozzeck for Opera Australia.

== Career ==
Longmuir's professional concert debut was in Gabriel Fauré's La naissance de Venus at the Konzerthaus Berlin, with the Berliner Cappella. The same year he made his professional operatic debut, in Tokyo, Japan, as Ismaele in Verdi's Nabucco.

The following year, he debuted for Opera Australia, at the Sydney Opera House, as Almaviva in The Barber of Seville. This began his association with Opera Australia, first as a young artist, then as a principal. Since joining the company, Longmuir has sung roughly 750 performances, across 50 roles.

Singing a wide range of repertoire, he appears frequently with Australia's major orchestras and arts companies, including: Sydney Symphony Orchestra, Melbourne Symphony Orchestra, West Australian Symphony Orchestra, Queensland Symphony Orchestra, West Australian Opera, State Opera of South Australia and Sydney Philharmonia.

== Roles ==
Roles performed for Opera Australia:

- Emilio in Partenope (Handel)
- Don Ottavio in Don Giovanni (Mozart)
- Tamino in The Magic Flute (Mozart)
- Idomeneo in Idomeneo (Mozart)
- Arbace in Idomeneo (Mozart)
- Almaviva in The Barber of Seville (Rossini)
- Narciso in Il turco in Italia (Rossini)
- Don Luigino in Il Viaggio a Reims (Rossini)
- Ernesto in Don Pasquale (Donizetti)
- Arturo in Lucia di Lammermoor (Donizetti)
- Nemorino in L'elisir D'amore (Donizetti)
- Sir Hervey in Anna Bolena (Donizetti)
- Alfredo in La Traviata (Verdi)
- Fenton in Falstaff (Verdi)
- Messenger in Aida (Verdi)
- Count of Lerma in Don Carlos (Verdi)
- Gastone in La Traviata (Verdi)
- Borsa in Rigoletto (Verdi)
- Cassio in Otello (Verdi)
- Roderigo in Otello (Verdi)
- Rodolfo in La Boheme (Puccini)
- Parpingnol in La Boheme (Puccini)
- Pong in Turandot (Puccini)
- Beppe in Pagliacci (Leoncavallo)
- Nadir in The Pearlfishers (Bizet)
- Juan in Don Quichotte (Massenet)
- Camille in The Merry Widow (Lehar)
- Njegus in The Merry Widow (Lehar)
- Spalanzani in The Tales of Hoffmann (Offenbach)
- Frantz/Andres/Cochenille/Pittichinaccio in The Tales of Hoffmann (Offenbach)
- Italian Tenor in Capriccio (Strauss)
- Fourth Jew in Salome (Strauss)
- Le Prince in The Love for Three Oranges (Prokofiev)
- Lensky in Eugene Onegin (Tchaikovsky)
- Ballad Singer in Of mice and Men (Floyd)
- Mayor Upfold in Albert Herring (Britten)
- Snout in A Midsummer night's Dream (Britten)
- Kunz Vogelgesang in Die Meistersinger von Nürnberg (Wagner)
- Loge in Das Rheingold (Wagner)
- Der Hauptmann in Wozzeck (Berg)
- The Colonel in Ghost Sonata (Reimann)
- Soloist in The Diary of One Who Vanished (Janacek)
- The Shephard in Krol Roger (Szymanowski)
- The Governor in Candide (Bernstein)
- Vanderdender in Candide (Bernstein)
- Jock in The Drover's Wife (Palmer)
- Dr Richardson in Breaking the Waves (Mazzoli)

Other operatic roles include:

- Oronte in Alcina (Handel)
- Grimoaldo in Rodelinda (Handel)
- Rinuccio in Gianni Schicchi (Puccini)
- Brighella in Ariadne auf Naxos (Strauss)
- Remendado in Carmen (Bizet)
- Ismaele in Nabucco (Verdi)
- Tapioca in L'etoile (Chabrier)
- Die Knusperhexe in Hansel und Gretel (Humperdinck)
- Rev. Horace Adams in Peter Grimes (Britten)
- Frederic in The Pirates of Penzance (Sullivan)
- Alexis in The Sorceror (Sullivan)
- Mavra in Mavra (Stravinsky)

Works performed in concert:

- Tenor Soloist in B Minor Mass (Bach)
- Evangelist in St Matthews Passion (Bach)
- Tenor Soloist/Evangelist in The Christmas Oratorio (Bach)
- Tenor Soloist in Magnificat (Bach)
- Tenor Soloist in Messiah (Handel)
- Belshazzar in Belshazzar (Handel)
- Tenor Soloist in Israel in Egypt (Handel)
- Tenor Soloist in Requiem in D minor (Mozart)
- Tenor Soloist in C Minor Mass (Mozart)
- Obadiah in Elijah (Mendelssohn)
- Tenor Soloist in Carmina Burana (Orff)
- Tenor Soloist in Stabat Mater (Rossini)

== Recognition and awards ==
- Winner of the 85th Herald Sun Aria competition 2009
- Winner of the Sydney Eisteddfod's Opera and Arts Support Scholarship 2009
- Inaugural winner of the Joan Sutherland & Richard Bonynge Foundation Bel Canto Award 2011
- Nominated in both the 'Best actor in an Opera' (Camille in Merry Widow) and 'Best supporting actor in an Opera' (Gastone in la Traviata & Arturo in Lucia di Lammermoor) categories in the BroadwayWorld Australia - Sydney Awards 2018
- Nominated in the 'Best Male Performer in a Supporting Role in Opera' (The Captain in Wozzeck for Opera Australia) in the 19th Annual Helpmann Awards 2019
- Nominated in both the 'Best actor in an Opera' (Nominated twice for Ghost Sonata and Wozzeck) and 'Best supporting actor in an Opera' (Nominated three times for Anna Bolena, Turandot and Peter Grimes) categories in the BroadwayWorld Australia - Sydney Awards 2019

== Television, radio broadcast and recordings ==
=== Television credits ===
- Appeared as a judge on the Seven network's musical competition program All Together Now which aired in 2018.
- Advertisements for Leggos and Dry July
- Appearances on the Seven Network's The Morning Show and Telethon

=== Radio broadcasts ===
All recorded and broadcast with The Australian Broadcasting Corporation:

- Stabat Mater (Rossini) with West Australian Symphony Orchestra
- Of Mice and Men (C. Flloyd) with Opera Australia
- Capriccio (R. Strauss) with Opera Australia
- B minor mass (Bach) with Queensland Symphony Orchestra
- Don Carlos (Verdi) with Opera Australia
- Albert Herring (Britten) with Opera Australia
- La Traviata (Verdi) with Opera Australia
- Don Quichotte (Massenet) with Opera Australia
- Lucia di Lammermoor (Donizetti) with Opera Australia
- Die Meistersinger von Nurnberg (Wagner) with Opera Australia
- Wozzeck (Berg) with Opera Australia
- Anna Bolena (Donizetti) with Opera Australia
- Peter Grimes (Britten) with Sydney Symphony Orchestra
- Turandot (Puccini) with Opera Australia
- Ghost Sonata (Reimann) with Opera Australia

=== Commercial recordings ===
- Rodelinda (Handel) conducted by Richard Bonynge (Australian Broadcasting Corporation); also appears in Richard Bonynge, The Opera Collection.
- Turandot (Puccini) (Australian Broadcasting Corporation) Also broadcast internationally in cinemas
- Guest artist on It's the Heart that Matters Most, Rachael Hardie (CD) Independent label
