= Henry Choo =

Australian operatic lyric tenor

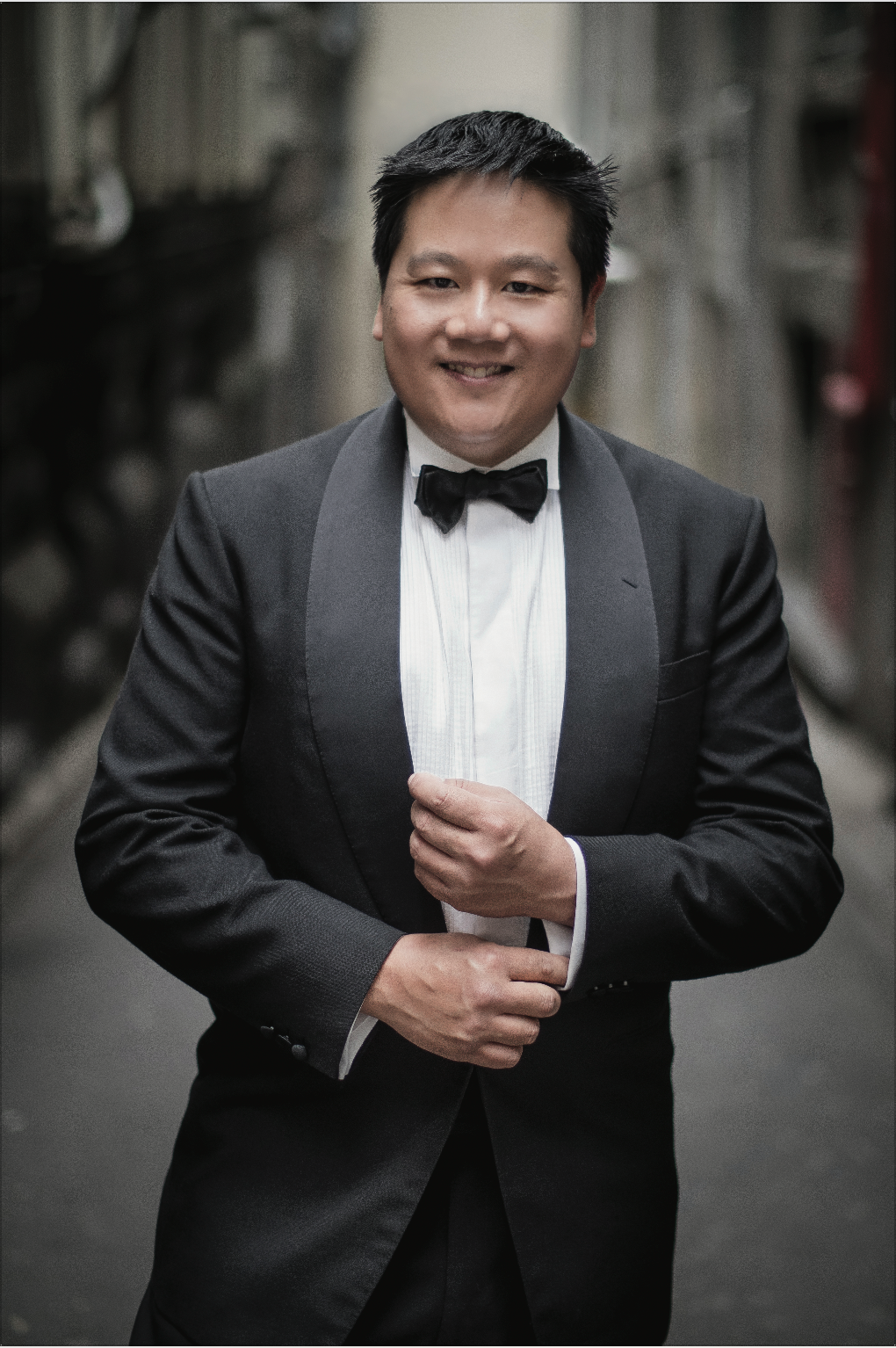
- Henry Choo, 2017
- Born: Henry Sze Miin Choo; Malaysia
- Education: Australian National Academy of Music
- Occupation: Opera singer
- Website: www.henrychoo.com

Henry Choo is an Australian operatic lyric tenor who has performed in all three of Donizetti's "Tudor Operas" (Anna Bolena, Maria Stuarda, Roberto Devereux).

== Early life ==
Choo was born in Malaysia as Henry Sze Miin Choo, and migrated to Australia at an early age.

== Musical career ==
Choo trained from an early age in piano, violin and singing. He attended Melbourne High School. Choo achieved an associate diploma in singing under the tutelage of Noel Ancell of the Australian Boys Choir, and furthered his operatic studies at the Melba Conservatorium and the Australian National Academy of Music, as well as with late French repertoire specialist Susan Falk.

Choo is a graduate of the Young Artist Program of Opera Queensland and the Moffatt Oxenbould Young Artist Development Program of Opera Australia. In 2004 he made his professional debut as Ernesto in Opera Queensland's production of Don Pasquale, which also toured regional Queensland. He featured in the world premiere of Brett Dean's 2010 opera Bliss at the Sydney Opera House which was broadcast live on ABC Television and released on DVD. His debut in a major role for Opera Australia was in 2010 as the Italian Singer in Richard Strauss's Der Rosenkavalier. This production was broadcast to Australian cinemas and released on DVD. On the concert stage, he sang the tenor role in the world premiere of Christopher Bowen's An Australian War Requiem in 2014 at the Sydney Town Hall which was released on CD and DVD. Choo sang Don Ottavio in Elke Neidhardt's 2008 production for Opera Australia. He sang the same role in Opera Australia's 2011 production which was broadcast on ABC Television and released on DVD.

Choo sang, together with Antoinette Halloran, "So Long, Farewell" in P. J. Hogan's 2012 film Mental.

In 2015, he received a Green Room Award nomination for his portrayal of Roberto in Donizetti's Maria Stuarda for Melbourne Opera, where he also sang the title role in an English-language production of Donizetti's Roberto Devereux. He completed in the same year Donizetti's "Tudor Operas" as Lord Percy in Anna Bolena in Perth. For CitiOpera Melbourne he sang Bacchus in Richard Strauss's Ariadne auf Naxos in 2016.

== Discography ==
In 2018, Choo released his debut solo album, a collection of lyric arias and songs entitled Bright Poet, recorded with Orchestra Wellington conducted by Marc Taddei. It was chosen by Melbourne classical radio station 3MBS as their CD of the week in August that year.
