= Melbourne Opera =

Australian opera company

Melbourne Opera logo

Melbourne Opera was founded in 2002 as a charitable not-for-profit company dedicated to producing opera and associated art forms in Melbourne, Australia. With philanthropic assistance it has also toured to outer-suburban and regional Victorian theatres, as well as to Canberra and Hobart interstate. Despite receiving no government funding since its foundation, the company mounts between three and five main stage productions each year. Its principal rehearsal and performance home is the Athenaeum Theatre.

Melbourne Opera is the business and trading name of South East Regional Touring Opera Ltd. The corporate name was changed on 1 June 2007 to reflect the company's much expanded geographical scope.

== History ==
Melbourne Opera's inaugural season consisted of La traviata directed by Blair Edgar, a new production of Bizet's The Pearl Fishers using Bizet's restored 1863 score, and Mozart's The Magic Flute, directed by Caroline Stacey. A proposed merger with Melbourne City Opera in 2005 did not proceed. In 2006 the company's first large scale tour commenced with a production of Don Giovanni travelling to Ballarat, Benalla, Frankston, Geelong, Hobart, Plenty Ranges, Sale, Warrnambool, and the Theatre Royal, Hobart. From 2010 to 2018 the company partnered with Monash University to bring performances to its Clayton Campus. In 2017 Melbourne Opera established the Richard Divall Emerging Artists Programme.

=== Bendigo Ring ===
In 2020 the company announced that it was embarking on a four-year project to perform Wagner's Der Ring des Nibelungen, commencing with Das Rheingold. This production was postponed due to the global outbreak of COVID-19 and was premiered in early 2021. Die Walküre, the second in the four Ring operas was premiered in 2022. Both Das Rheingold and Die Walküre were performed in Melbourne and in Bendigo, the regional Victorian city where the full Ring Cycle would eventually be performed. The third Ring opera, Siegfried, was first given a concert performance in Melbourne in 2022. The company presented three full Ring Cycles in Bendigo at the Ulumbarra Theatre in 2023, with Siegfried receiving its staged premiere, followed by the company's premiere of Götterdämmerung. It was the first independent production of Der Ring des Nibelungen to be staged in Australia in over 100 years, critically acclaimed and attracting audiences from Melbourne, interstate and from overseas. The cast included: Warwick Fyfe as Wotan, Sarah Sweeting and Dimity Shepherd as Fricka, Antoinette Halloran and Zara Barrett as Brünnhilde, Simon Meadows as Alberich, James Egglestone as Loge and Siegmund, Lee Abrahmsen as Freia, Steven Gallop as Fafner, Robert Macfarlane (tenor) as Mime, and Deborah Humble as Erda.

=== Productions ===
Productions of Melbourne Opera have included:

- 2003 La traviata (Verdi), The Pearl Fishers (Bizet), The Magic Flute (Mozart)
- 2004 Madama Butterfly (Puccini), Rigoletto (Verdi), Così fan tutte (Mozart)
- 2005 Madama Butterfly (Puccini), The Tell-Tale Heart (Dennis Vaughan), (Note: World premiere concert performance) Die Fledermaus (Johann Strauss II)
- 2006 Don Giovanni (Mozart), The Barber of Seville (Rossini), Madama Butterfly (Puccini)
- 2007 Madama Butterfly (Puccini), Carmen (Bizet), Cavalleria rusticana (Mascagni), Suor Angelica (Puccini), The Italian Girl in Algiers (Rossini), The Barber of Seville (Rossini).
- 2008 La bohème (Puccini), The Marriage of Figaro (Mozart), I puritani (Bellini)
- 2009 La traviata (Verdi), Tosca (Puccini)
- 2010 The Barber of Seville (Rossini), Cavalleria rusticana (Mascagni), Pagliacci (Leoncavello), Madama Butterfly (Puccini)
- 2011 The Merry Widow (Lehár), Faust (Gounod), Carmen (Bizet)
- 2012 The Merry Widow (Lehár), La bohème (Puccini), Carmen (Bizet), Così fan tutte (Mozart)
- 2013 Fidelio (Beethoven), The Merry Widow (Lehár), Così fan tutte (Mozart), La traviata (Verdi), Rienzi (Wagner)†,
- 2014 Rienzi (Wagner)†, Madama Butterfly (Puccini), The Pearl Fishers (Bizet)
- 2015 Der Freischütz (Weber), The Barber of Seville (Rossini), Maria Stuarda (Donizetti)
- 2016 The Abduction from the Seraglio (Mozart), Tannhäuser (Wagner), Anna Bolena (Donizetti) (Note: Australian premiere)
- 2017 H.M.S. Pinafore (Gilbert and Sullivan), Lohengrin (Wagner), Roberto Devereux (Donizetti)
- 2018 Tristan und Isolde (Wagner), Der Rosenkavalier (Richard Strauss), Otello (Rossini)
- 2019 Der fliegende Holländer (Wagner), Norma (Donizetti)
- 2020 Fidelio (Beethoven)
- 2021 Das Rheingold (Wagner), Macbeth (Verdi)
- 2022 Die Walküre (Wagner), Rise and Fall of the City of Mahagonny (Weill/Brecht), Lucrezia Borgia (Donizetti), Siegfried (Wagner)†
- 2023 Der Ring des Nibelungen (Wagner), Maria Stuarda (Donizetti)
- 2024 Lucia di Lammermoor (Donizetti), The Marriage of Figaro (Mozart), La bohème (Puccini), and Suor Angelica (Puccini)

== Governance ==
Melbourne Opera is charitable company governed by a board; the current chair is David Pitt.

== Patrons ==
- Patron-in-Chief: Lady Potter AC CMRI
- Patron: Richard Bonynge AC CBE
- Founding Patrons: Sir Zelman Cowen AK GCMG GCVO KStJ QC, Prof Richard Divall AO OBE, Sir Rupert Hamer AC KCMG, Lady Hamer, Dame Elisabeth Murdoch AC DBE, Dame Joan Sutherland OM AC CBE.

== Orchestra ==
The Melbourne Opera Orchestra was founded in 2003 and has developed into an ensemble in its own right. In December 2015/January 2016, and December 2016/January 2017 the orchestra undertook a concert tour of China.

== Conductors ==
Greg Hocking AM is Melbourne Opera's conductor-in-residence and Raymond Lawrence is Head of Music. Guest conductors include John Dingle, Richard Divall, Patrick Burns, Ben Hudson, David Kram AM, Armando Krieger, Anthony Negus, Aldo Salvagno, Warwick Stengards and Matthew Toogood.

== Stage directors ==
Directors who have worked with the company include: Bruce Beresford, Greg Carroll, Suzanne Chaundy, Blair Edgar, Hugh Halliday, Plamen Kartaloff, Robert Ray, and Caroline Stacey.

== Richard Divall Program ==
The Richard Divall Emerging Artists Program was created to honour the memory of Richard Divall AO OBE, supported by a bequest made by Melbourne-born soprano, Sylvia Fisher. Upon her death, Fisher made this bequest to ensure the continuing support of the development new artists of operatic excellence in her hometown, Melbourne. Divall was closely involved in the planning and creation of this program before his death in 2017. The first intake of performers was in 2018.
