= Joan Sutherland & Richard Bonynge Foundation =

Australian opera charity

The Joan Sutherland & Richard Bonynge Foundation is an Australian organisation based in Sydney, founded by the Australian soprano Joan Sutherland and her husband, conductor and promoter Richard Bonynge. Its purpose is to assist young opera artists study bel canto opera, chiefly in the form of annual awards established in 2011, principal of which is the Bel Canto Award, ranging between $30,000 and $50,000.

One of the Foundation's income streams is from sale of a coffee-table book devoted to "Chalet Monet", the couple's residence in Switzerland, overlooking Lake Geneva, which they purchased through their friendship with Noël Coward.

The Foundation also administers the Elizabeth Connell Prize for aspiring young dramatic sopranos. The prize is funded by an endowment bequeathed by, and named for, the South African soprano Elizabeth Connell.

== Bel Canto Award winners ==
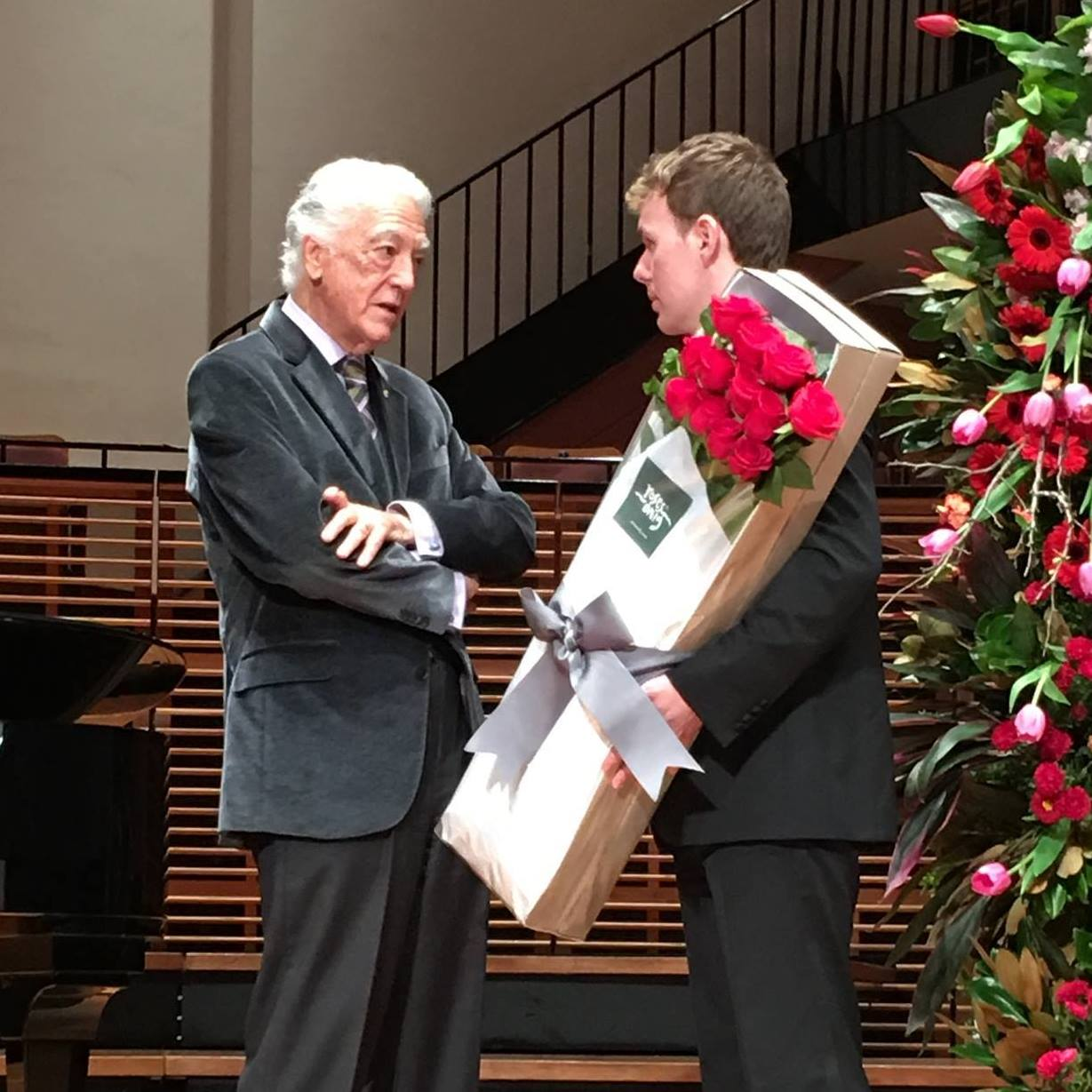
Richard Bonynge and Bel Canto Award winner Alasdair Kent at the Joan Sutherland & Richard Bonynge Foundation Bel Canto Award in 2016

- 2011: John Longmuir, tenor
- 2012: Pene Pati, tenor
- 2013: Naomi Johns, soprano
- 2014: Marlena Devoe, soprano
- 2015: Isabella Moore, soprano
- 2016: Alasdair Kent, tenor
- 2017: Bronwyn Douglass, mezzo-soprano
- 2018: Benson Wilson, baritone
- 2019: Kiandra Howarth, soprano
- 2020: grants awarded to multiple singers, including Samantha Clarke, Kiandra Howarth, Sam Sakker, Alexandra Flood & Ashlyn Tymms
- 2021: grants awarded to multiple singers, including Fleuranne Brockway, James Young, Damian Arnold, Amelia Wawrzon & Melissa Gregory
- 2022: Fleuranne Brockway, mezzo-soprano
- 2023: Rebecca Gulinello, soprano
- 2024: Eliza Boom, soprano
