= Songs My Mother Taught Me (Joan Sutherland album) =

Album cover for Songs My Mother Taught Me'

Songs My Mother Taught Me is an album by the Australian soprano Joan Sutherland recorded in August 1972 with the New Philharmonia Orchestra under Richard Bonynge in Kingsway Hall, London. The album's title comes from the song by Antonín Dvořák, "Songs My Mother Taught Me". It also includes songs by Mendelssohn, Liszt, Grieg, Delibes, Massenet and others. The original album, previously on the Belart label, was remastered by ABC Classics and was re-released with additions in 2001, the year of Sutherland's 75th birthday. It was disc 14 of Decca Records' issue of Sutherland's complete studio recitals, released in 2011.
