= Benson Wilson =

New Zealand opera singer

- Born: New Zealand
- Writing career
- Notable awards: Lexus Song Quest; Kathleen Ferrier Awards
- Website: www.bensonwilson.com

Benson Wilson is a New Zealand-born baritone opera singer of Samoan heritage currently based in London, United Kingdom.

== Life ==
Born in New Zealand to a Samoan family, Wilson was raised in the Seventh Day Adventist faith in which song was a part of daily life. He was able to harmonise while singing from age 5, but his vocal talent was not recognised until he was 15, when he began singing in the New Zealand Secondary Students Choir and entering competitions. Although tall and muscular, he was banned from playing rugby by his mother for fear of injury. Wilson spent his teenage years in Havelock North, where he won Hawke's Bay Young Musician of the Year in 2009. He attended Havelock North High School.

Wilson graduated in 2014 from the University of Auckland with a Bachelor of Music Honours (Vocal Performance), and was awarded the Vice-Chancellor's Cultural Grant. He won the Symphony prize in the 2015 IFAC Australian Singing Competition, which gave him a year's free tuition at the Guildhall School of Music and Drama in London starting in 2016.

Wilson and his partner Isabella Moore met in the Secondary Students Choir, but did not become romantically involved until 2019, and got engaged on Valentine's Day 2021.

== Career ==
Wilson was a member of the New Zealand Youth Choir from 2011, and toured the US and Canada with the choir in 2013. He was a member of New Zealand Opera's Chapman Tripp Chorus in 2014.

In September 2019 he joined the Young Artists Programme of the National Opera Studio in the UK. IN 2020–2021 he was a Harewood Artist in training at English National Opera.

With Bloomsbury Opera he performed Count Almaviva in Le nozze di Figaro and Guglielmo in Così fan tutte. His first roles with English National Opera were Schaunard in La bohème and John Shears in the Benjamin Britten operetta Paul Bunyan. He has also performed Marullo in Rigoletto for Glyndebourne on Tour in 2019 and John Sorel in Menotti's The Consul at Welsh National Opera in 2020, as well as alongside both the London Symphony Orchestra and the BBC Symphony Orchestra.

in mid-2020, having had multiple contracts cancelled due to the COVID pandemic, Benson and Moore returned to New Zealand to tour a recital programme. They performed at Auckland Chamber Concert Hall, Hawkes Bay Opera House, and Auckland Opera Studio. In November 2020 they were both part of a group of New Zealand singers in London who recorded the concert Whānau: London Voices of Aotearoa, far from home at the Royal Albert Hall. In an April 25 (Anzac Day) 2021 recital at Leeds Town Hall entitled "Maumaraha" (Remembrance), Wilson included two arrangements of the traditional Māori songs Oriori! O Nohomaiterangi and Ake ake kia kahe e!

== Honours and awards ==
Wilson was a finalist in the 2014 Lexus Song Quest, winning second place to his future partner Isabella Moore. He won first place in the 2015 Napier Aria Competition. He then went on to win the next Lexus Song Quest in 2016, being awarded "Most Promising Opera Singer" and a study scholarship.

In 2018 Wilson won the Joan Sutherland & Richard Bonynge Foundation Bel Canto Award, also being awarded the People's Choice award.

In 2019 he won the 64th Kathleen Ferrier award, the first Samoan to do so, and was awarded the Most Outstanding Overseas Performer of the Royal Overseas League Competition and the Worshipful Company of Musicians Award.
