= Havelock North High School =

Location
- 153 Te Mata Road; Havelock North 4130; New Zealand; 39.6663°S 176.8948°E

Information
- Type: Secondary (year 9–13)
- Motto: Whaia te iti kahurangi (Aim to excel)
- Established: 1975
- Ministry of Education Institution no.: 223
- Principal: Joel Wilton
- Enrolment: 1,153 (July 2026)
- Houses: Tainui Kauri Rata Miro
- Colors: Light Blue, Dark Blue and White
- Socio-economic decile: 8P
- Website: www.hnhs.school.nz

Havelock North High School is a state co-education secondary school located in Havelock North, New Zealand.

HNHS has 3 head students chosen by the Form 7 (Year 13) students at the start of the year as well as the secretary. HNHS is split into four houses which compete against each other during the year in events such as a swimming sports, athletics, house choir and house kapa haka

Havelock North High School 1XI Girls Cricket Team were the national secondary school girls cricket team title holder in 2008. HNHS also hosted the national orienteering secondary school girls champions in 2008.

== History ==
Havelock North High School opened in 1975. Like many New Zealand state secondary schools of the era, it was built to the "S68" standard plan, with single-storey classroom blocks of masonry construction, low-pitched roofs and internal open courtyards.

A school auditorium was built in 1985, and received weatherproofing upgrades in 2021. In 2020 the school announced plans for a new auditorium. In September 2023 the school sought additional funding for the build as a result of costs increases due to the COVID-19 pandemic.

In 2023, Joel Wilton took over as principal of the school. Wilton had previously been a deputy principal and a science and chemistry teacher, and was a notable musician in the 2000s as the drummer for the band Goldenhorse.

== Enrolment ==
As of July 2026, Havelock North High School has a roll of 1,153 students, of which 214 (18.6%) identify as Māori.

As of 2026, Havelock North High School has an Equity Index of 434, placing it amongst schools whose students have below average socioeconomic barriers to achievement (roughly equivalent to deciles 6 and 7 under the former socio-economic decile system).

== Academics ==
Havelock North High School follows the New Zealand Curriculum. In Years 11 to 13, students complete the National Certificate of Educational Achievement (NCEA), the main secondary school qualification in New Zealand.

In 2024, 92.0% of students leaving Havelock North High School attained at least NCEA Level 1, 87.7% attained at least NCEA Level 2, and 74.1% attained at least NCEA Level 3. For schools in the same equity index band, the national attainment rates were 90.1%, 83.0%, and 61.0% respectively.

== Houses ==
The Houses are named after trees found in New Zealand.

- Tainui (yellow)
- Kauri (blue)
- Rata (red)
- Miro (orange)

Throughout the year, the four houses compete in a variety of sporting, cultural and academic events. Points are awarded both on individual success and collective house participation. The house with the most points is declared that year's winner, and a symbolic patu is presented to representatives of the winning house at the end of year prizegiving.

Each year the school picks a selection of 8 events. Athletics, Swimming Sports, Year 13 camp all are done while House Kapa Haka and Choir alternate every year. The final four are selection of past years and new ideas.

Some house events include:

- Swimming Sports
- Athletic Sports
- Year 13 camp
- House Quiz
- House Cross Country
- House Orienteering
- House Theater Sports
- House Choir
- House Kapa haka
- Army Challenge

The introduction of several new events over recent years, (such as house quiz), are an attempt to expand house competition to beyond the traditional confines of sporting activities.

== Notable alumni ==
- Lynda Chanwai-Earle – writer
- Jarrod Cunningham – rugby union player
- Alby Mathewson – rugby union player
- Connan Mockasin – musician, composer and record producer
- Greg Murphy – motor racing driver
- Geoff Sewell – opera singer
- Antonio Te Maioha – actor
- William Trubridge – freediver
- Benson Wilson – opera singer
