= CitiOpera =

Coordinates: 37.817798°S 144.968714°E

CitiOpera was a semi-professional opera company based in Melbourne, Australia. Formed in 1997, and originally known as Melbourne City Opera, which in turn produced the "spin off" company, Melbourne Opera. it was the successor of Globe Opera. In 2007 the company began performing at the BMW Edge, a 450-seat indoor amphitheatre located in Federation Square. The company closed some time after 2019.

Initially the company made its home at the National Theatre, the Comedy Theatre and later at the Melbourne Athenaeum, and featured Suzanne Steele, Ronald Dowd, Margaret Nisbett, Maureen Howard, and Ron Stevens in productions of La bohème, Faust, Carmen, Pagliacci, Cavalleria rusticana, Madama Butterfly, The Merry Widow, Die Fledermaus, The Student Prince, and many others.

The 2007 season began with productions of Verdi's Il corsaro, Attila and The Pavarotti Story, devised and narrated by director Joseph Talia and conducted by Erich Fackert. In 2008 the season commenced with a concert production of Beethoven's Fidelio at Melba Hall, University of Melbourne. The company presented The Puccini Story in honour of the 150th anniversary of the birth of Giacomo Puccini. This program was an analysis of how Puccini's personal characteristics impacted on the creation of his characters and the composition of his music. In March 2009, the company staged Verdi's Ernani.

Melbourne City Opera staged Verdi's Luisa Miller in September 2009, Andrea Chénier in June 2010, La rondine in November 2010 and presented a tribute to Dame Joan Sutherland in November 2011 at the BMW Edge.

In March 2018, Melbourne CitiOpera presented the Australian premiere performance of Rimsky-Korsakov's Kashchey the Immortal, conducted by Alan Cook.
