= Australian Boys Choir =

Children's Choir in Melbourne, Australia

- Choir
- Origin: Melbourne, Victoria, Australia
- Founded: 1939
- Founder: Vincent J. Kelly
- Genre: Choral music, Sacred music, contemporary
- Members: Boys aged 7–18; adult ensemble (Vocal Consort)
- Music director: Nicholas Dinopoulos
- Artistic Director: Nicholas Dinopoulos
- Website: australianboyschoir.com.au

The Australian Boys Choir is an all-male children's choir based in Melbourne, Australia. Its artistic director is Nicholas Dinopoulos. The choir was formed in 1939 by Vincent J. Kelly who was musical director until his death in 1972. Subsequent musical/artistic directors were Geoffrey Jones (1972–1978), Ian Harrison (1979–1983), Noel Ancell (1983–2018) and Nicholas Dinopoulos (2018-)

Based in the eastern suburbs of Melbourne, the choir presents an annual subscription series of formal concerts, as well as other engagements (television, radio and film). Films that the choir have provided soundtracks for include the Oscar-nominated Elizabeth, and the Australian box office hit The Dish.

Known for its high standards of excellence and extremely broad repertoire of music, the choir performs pieces by many composers, including Bach, Benjamin Britten, John Rutter, Noel Ancell, Mahler, Tchaikovsky and Jim Steinman. The choir has a strong commitment to Australian choral music and regularly commissions and performs new or recent works.

== Training/performing groups ==
The Australian Boys Choir consists of different levels for boys in training. Using Kodály methodology and starting at around the age of 7 or 8, boys begin training as probationers usually for six months (one school semester). Emphasis is on enjoyment and through musical games boys develop basic understanding of musical methods and singing. The next stage is 'tyros', where boys spend 9 to 12 months, depending on their abilities, working on aural development and music reading skills as well as vocal development. 'Junior singers' follows 'tyros', with more emphasis on vocal technique and music reading skills. Performance skills become important at this level. 'Senior singers' focus more on performance skills, while continuing to broaden their own musical skills and experience. Boys at this level become eligible to sing with the performing choir. Choir members who achieve the highest levels of musical proficiency are promoted to the rank of chorister, the highest rank in the Australian Boys Choir. The performing choir of the Australian Boys Choir comprises boys selected for their talent and dedication. Not every boy will earn a place in this performing group, which undertakes major concerts and other appearances, national and international tours and recording engagements.

All of the above-mentioned groups and training levels are for the unchanged (treble) male voice. Once the voices of choir members have changed, the young men may continue in the 'Kelly Gang', named not for the notorious bushrangers, but in recognition of the founder of the Australian Boys Choir – Vincent J. Kelly. As part of the Kelly Gang, the emphasis is on learning to sing with their new voices with performances and tours of lesser priority. The young men continue in the Kelly Gang until finishing secondary school after which they can audition for the Vocal Consort. The Vocal Consort was formed in 1984 to complement the work of the Australian Boys Choir and is composed of adult men, most of whom have progressed through the training levels of the choir. In addition to performing with the Australian Boys Choir, the Vocal Consort tours in Australia and overseas and presents many performances in its own right.

== Tours ==
The Australian Boys' Choir tours frequently. International tour locations include the United States, UK, Europe, Japan, Indonesia, Malaysia and Singapore. In 1989, the choir went on a world tour which ended in New York. The choir also tours in Australia. Recent national tour locations include Tasmania, Canberra, Adelaide and Perth. In 2013 the Australian Boys Choir and the Vocal Consort toured to Malaysia.

== Past members ==
More than 1500 boys have reached the level of the performing choir in the over 80-year history of the Australian Boys Choir, including many who have gone on to careers in music and the arts. Some past members are listed below.

- Henry Choo (choir 1985–1990) – staff and TVC
- John Derum (choir 1956–1961) – actor
- Jon Finlayson (choir 1950–1954) – actor, writer
- Christopher Gordon (choir 1967–1971, TVC 1984) – composer
- Trevor Jones (choir 1985–1988, staff, TVC 1998–2003)
- Gordon Moyes (choir 1950–1952)
- Dominic Natoli (choir 1966–1971)
- Jesse Spencer (choir 1986–1992) – actor best known for Neighbours, House and Chicago Fire
- Derek Welton (choir 1992–1995)
- Tim Masman (choir 2004–2007)
