= Elizabeth Connell =

South African-born opera singer

- Born: 22 October 1946; Port Elizabeth, South Africa
- Died: 18 February 2012 (aged 65); London, England
- Occupations: Soprano; Mezzo-soprano
- Writing career
- Subject: Music

Frances Elizabeth Connell (22 October 1946 – 18 February 2012) was a South African-born operatic mezzo-soprano, and later soprano, whose career took place mainly in the United Kingdom and Australia.

Connell was born in Port Elizabeth, South Africa in 1946, to a Catholic father from South Africa and a Protestant mother from Port Elizabeth, one of five children.

Connell attained an opera scholarship to the London Opera Centre, and came to the UK in 1970. Her teachers there included Otakar Kraus, who told her that 'one day you'll be a dramatic soprano'. In 1972, she was a winner of the Maggie Teyte prize for young musicians, and also made her professional debut at Wexford Festival Opera in Ireland, as she was initially not able to appear in British opera houses, as a white South African during the era of apartheid. She attained Irish citizenship via her grandfather. She read music at the University of the Witwatersrand, and after taking her degree, taught music and geography in secondary school. At the invitation of Edward Downes, she sang at the opening of the Sydney Opera House in Prokofiev's War and Peace in 1973, as Princess Marya, and continued to have a special relationship with Opera Australia for the rest of her career. Her UK career attained greater prominence after her appearance at the 1975 First Night of The Proms in Mahler's Symphony No 8. She then had a regular five-year association with English National Opera.

Her debut at London's Royal Opera House, Covent Garden was in Verdi's I Lombardi. She first sang at Bayreuth in 1980 as Ortrud in Lohengrin, a role she performed in a video production, at the Vienna State Opera and the Paris Opéra (Bastille).

In 1983, Connell transitioned to singing full-time as a soprano, by cancelling all of her engagements for mezzo parts, and taking time to avoid speaking or singing, with subsequent gradual transition into soprano roles. Her early performances as a soprano included Corine from Luigi Cherubini's Anacréon, Fiordiligi (Così fan tutte) and Julia in Gasparo Spontini's La Vestale.

Her Metropolitan Opera debut was in 1985, as Vitellia (La clemenza di Tito), and her Opéra de Paris debut was in 1987 as Senta (The Flying Dutchman).

Her dramatic qualities were praised in her performance (as Senta in The Flying Dutchman) in Tokyo with Seiji Ozawa conducting. Her San Francisco Opera debut was in 1987 and she was frequently invited back.

She sang the role of Brünnhilde in both Die Walküre (Santiago, Chile opera) and Siegfried (Rome Opera). Her repertory included leading roles in the Verdi operas Nabucco, Macbeth, and Oberto. Her performances as Isolde in Wagner's Tristan und Isolde included appearances at the Opera Real in Madrid and a concert performance in Carnegie Hall. Other parts she sang were Ellen Orford in Britten's Peter Grimes and the Kostelnicka in Janáček's Jenufa.

In 2004, she sang Leonore in a performance of Fidelio by Cape Town Opera staged at Robben Island, 10 years after the release of Nelson Mandela from prison there.

Connell's final performance was a recital on 27 November 2011 in Hastings. She had intended to retire to Australia, but the diagnosis of her cancer prevented this. She died in London on 18 February 2012, aged 65. She married baritone Robert Eddie in 1987; the marriage ended in dissolution. Her three brothers John, Peter, and Paul, and her sister Rosemary survive her.

== Legacy ==
Her will provided an endowment to assist aspiring dramatic sopranos. Named the Elizabeth Connell prize in her honour, it is administered by the Joan Sutherland & Richard Bonynge Foundation.

== Recordings ==
Her many recordings include Rossini's Guglielmo Tell (Decca, Riccardo Chailly), Mahler's Eighth Symphony (EMI, Klaus Tennstedt), Mendelssohn's Second Symphony (DG, Claudio Abbado), Franz Schreker's Die Gezeichneten (Decca, Lothar Zagrosek), Gaetano Donizetti's Poliuto (NuovaEra, Jan Latham-Koenig, Live Opera di Roma), Giuseppe Verdi's I due Foscari (Philips, Lamberto Gardelli), Schoenberg's Gurre-Lieder (Denon, Eliahu Inbal), Richard Wagner's Tristan und Isolde (Squires Productions, Eve Queler, Carnegie Hall Live 1997) and Schubert Lieder with Graham Johnson, as part of Hyperion Records Complete Schubert Edition.

In 2008, two important CD releases were added to her discography: Her first operatic recital, singing great scenes by Wagner and Strauss for ABC Classics, conducted by Muhai Tang, and Benjamin Britten's Owen Wingrave, conducted by Richard Hickox. Elizabeth Connell also recorded portions of Sir Granville Bantock's "The Song of Songs" under the baton of Vernon Handley, for Hyperion.

Some of her opera performances recorded for television have also been released on DVD. Lohengrin (1982 Bayreuth Festival, dir Götz Friedrich, EuroArts), Nabucco (1996 Opera Australia/Sydney Opera House, ABC - Opus Arte/Kultur), Hänsel und Gretel (1998, The Royal Opera/Royal Opera House, Opus Arte, DVD/Blu-ray).
