= The Ghost Sonata =

1907 three-act play by August Strindberg

The Ghost Sonata (Swedish: Spöksonaten, lit. 'The Spook-Sonata') is a play in three acts by the Swedish playwright August Strindberg. Written in 1907, it was first produced at Strindberg's Intimate Theatre in Stockholm on 21 January 1908. Since then, it has been staged by such notable directors as Max Reinhardt, Olof Molander, Roger Blin, and Ingmar Bergman. Bergman directed it four times: in 1941, 1954, 1973, and 2000. Strindberg took the title from Beethoven's Piano Sonata No. 17 in D minor, which he called 'The Gespenster Sonata', and also Piano Trio No. 5 in D major, known as the 'Ghost Trio'.

The Ghost Sonata is a key text in the development of modernist drama and a vivid example of a chamber play. In it, Strindberg creates a world in which ghosts walk in bright daylight, a beautiful woman is transformed into a mummy and lives in the closet, and the household cook sucks all the nourishment out of the food before she serves it to her masters.

== Plot ==
The Ghost Sonata relates the adventures of a young student, who idealizes the lives of the inhabitants of a stylish apartment building in Stockholm. He makes the acquaintance of the mysterious Jacob Hummel, who helps him to find his way into the apartment, only to find that it is a nest of betrayal and sickness. The world, the student learns, is hell and human beings must suffer to achieve salvation. The play centers on a family of strangers who meet for the sake of meeting. They exchange no dialogue, nor gestures; they simply sit and bask in their own misfortune.

== Characters ==
- The Old Man, Jacob Hummel
- The Student, Mr. Arkenholz
- The Milkmaid, An apparition
- The Superintendent's wife
- The Superintendent
- The Dead Man, a Consul
- The Lady in Black, Daughter of the Dead Man and the Superintendent's wife
- The Colonel
- The Mummy, the Colonel's wife
- The Young Lady, the Colonel's daughter, but actually the Old Man's daughter
- Johansson, Hummel's servant
- Bengtsson, The Colonel's footman
- The Fiancée, a white-haired woman, formerly engaged to Hummel
- The Cook
- Beggars
- The Nobleman, engaged to the Lady in Black

== See also ==
- Isle of the Dead (Böcklin's painting)
- Die Gespenstersonate, opera by Julius Weismann (1930)
- Die Gespenstersonate opera by Aribert Reimann (1984)
