= Die Gespenstersonate =

1984 opera by Aribert Reimann

- Opera by Aribert Reimann
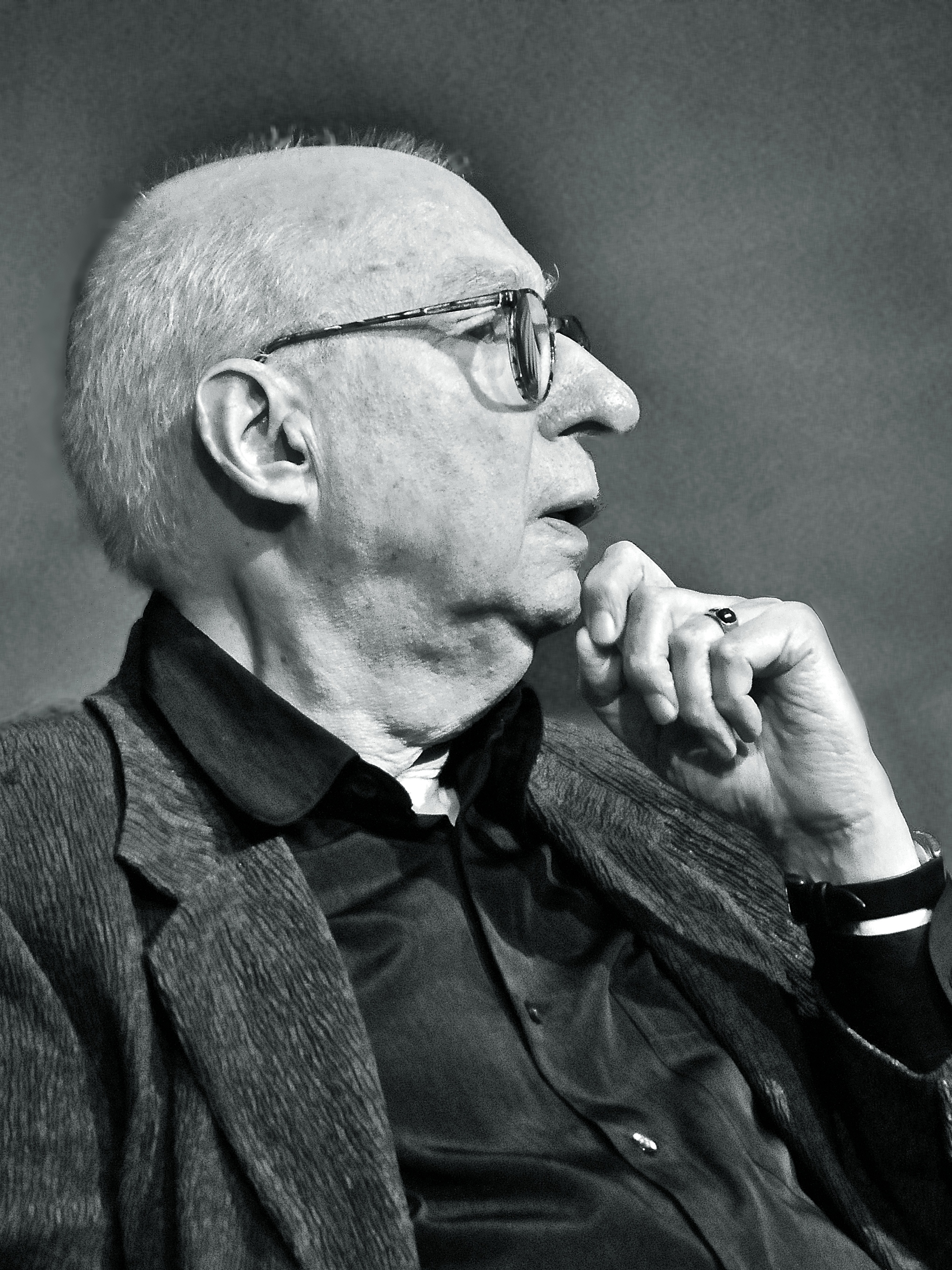
- The composer in 2010
- Librettist: Reimann; Uwe Schendel
- Language: German
- Based on: The Ghost Sonata by August Strindberg
- Premiere: 1984; Deutsche Oper Berlin

Die Gespenstersonate is a 1984 German-language opera by Aribert Reimann to a libretto by the composer and Uwe Schendel after August Strindberg's play The Ghost Sonata. Strindberg's play also inspired another opera, Die Gespenstersonate by Julius Weismann (1930).

== Premiere ==
World premiere by the Deutsche Oper Berlin at the Hebbel Theater in Berlin with the Junge Deutsche Philharmonie and Ensemble Modern featured:

- Der Alte – Hans Günther Nöcker
- Die Mumie – Martha Mödl
- Der Oberst – Horst Hiestermann
- Der Student Arkenholz – David Knutson
- Das Fräulein – Gudrun Sieber
- Johansson – Donald Grobe
- Bengtsson – William Dooley
- Die Dunkle Dame – Barbara Scherler
- Die Köchin – Kaja Borris

A video of the premiere was released on DVD by Arthaus
