= Lee Abrahmsen =

Australian soprano (born 1982)

- Born: August 28, 1982 (age 43); Geelong
- Instrument: Operatic Soprano
- Website: leeabrahmsen.com

Lee Abrahmsen is an Australian Swedish operatic soprano based in Australia best known for singing Wagnerian roles. She has performed both in and out of Australia.

== Career ==
Abrahmsen is an Australian soprano best known for singing Wagnerian roles. She debuted as Elisabeth in Tannhäuser, where she was called "the highlight of the evening", and performed for Melbourne Opera as Brünnhilde in Siegfried and Die Walküre, where she was called a "Valkyrie to the hilt", (Opera Magazine), as Isolde in Tristan und Isolde, a portrayal awarded Opera Chaser's outstanding performance award; as Senta in Der fliegende Holländer, as Eva in Die Meistersinger von Nürnberg (February 2025), where she was praised by Opera Magazine, and as Sieglinde in Melbourne Opera's award‑winning Ring Cycle.

Alongside her Wagnerian roles, Abrahmsen is also known for her Italian repertoire. She has performed in roles such as Tosca (Australian Discovery Orchestra), Countess in Le nozze di Figaro, Cio‑Cio‑San in Madama Butterfly (Opera Australia), Mimì in La bohème and Donna Anna in Don Giovanni (Melbourne Opera), and was praised by critics including Man in Chair.

Abrahmsen has sung over 45 principal roles across Australia. Her repertoire has included Marschallin in Der Rosenkavalier, Leonore in Fidelio, Konstanze in Die Entführung aus dem Serail, Marguerite in Faust, Micaëla in Carmen, Valencienne in The Merry Widow (for Melbourne Opera), Violetta in La traviata, and the Australian premiere of Stella by George Marshall-Hall. Most recently, she covered Amelia in Un ballo in maschera for Chelsea Opera in London.

She has performed with companies including Opera Australia, Opera Queensland, Melbourne Symphony Orchestra, Sydney Symphony Orchestra, Queensland Symphony Orchestra Omega Ensemble, Melbourne Opera, Iopera, Victorian Opera, Corpus Medicorum and Coopera. Outside Australia, she has performed at the Edinburgh Festival, Academy of St Martin in the Fields in London, Chelsea Opera London, and stages in China and Japan.

She has been awarded the Herald Sun Aria, the MOST Opera Awards Royal Over‑Seas League Prize, the MOST Opera Awards Performance Prize, and the Acclaim Awards Italian Fellowship Award. Her portrayal of Isolde earned Opera Chaser's Outstanding Performance in a Lead Role, and her performances as Senta, the Marschallin, Valencienne, and Brünnhilde have garnered multiple Green Room Award nominations. Her voice has been captured in performances recorded by ABC Classic FM, featured on Qantas In‑Flight Entertainment in Strauss's Four Last Songs with Omega Ensemble, and she has performed the national anthem for Cricket Australia at the Melbourne and Sydney Ashes Tests.

She has also performed in concerts. She has appeared as soprano soloist in Brahms's Ein Deutsches Requiem with the Melbourne Symphony Orchestra and performed Strauss's Vier letzte Lieder with the Queensland Symphony Orchestra conducted by Eivind Aadland. She has given a recital with Omega Ensemble at the Sydney Opera House and performed at the Port Fairy Spring Music Festival and Peninsula Summer Music Festival with pianist Caroline Almonte. Additional performances include Mahler's Fourth Symphony, Strauss's Vier letzte Lieder (chamber version by James Ledger), Strauss's Elektra as Fifth Maid with the Sydney Symphony conducted by David Robertson, Berlioz's Les Nuits d'été, Mozart's Exsultate, jubilate, and Verdi's Requiem with the Camerata Orchestra.

In addition to her performing career, Abrahmsen has also stated she runs Italian Vocal Technique (IVT), an education and performance initiative based in North Melbourne, which she says is dedicated to preserving and passing on the bel canto tradition.

== Awards ==
- Herald Sun Aria
- MOST Opera Awards Royal Overseas League Award
- Acclaim Awards first prize
- Opera Chaser's outstanding female in a lead role for Isolde in Tristan und Isolde
- Greenroom Awards nominations for best female lead and in the roles of Isolde, Brünnhilde, Senta, Die Marschallin and Valencienne for Melbourne Opera
