= Julius Weismann =

German pianist, conductor, and composer

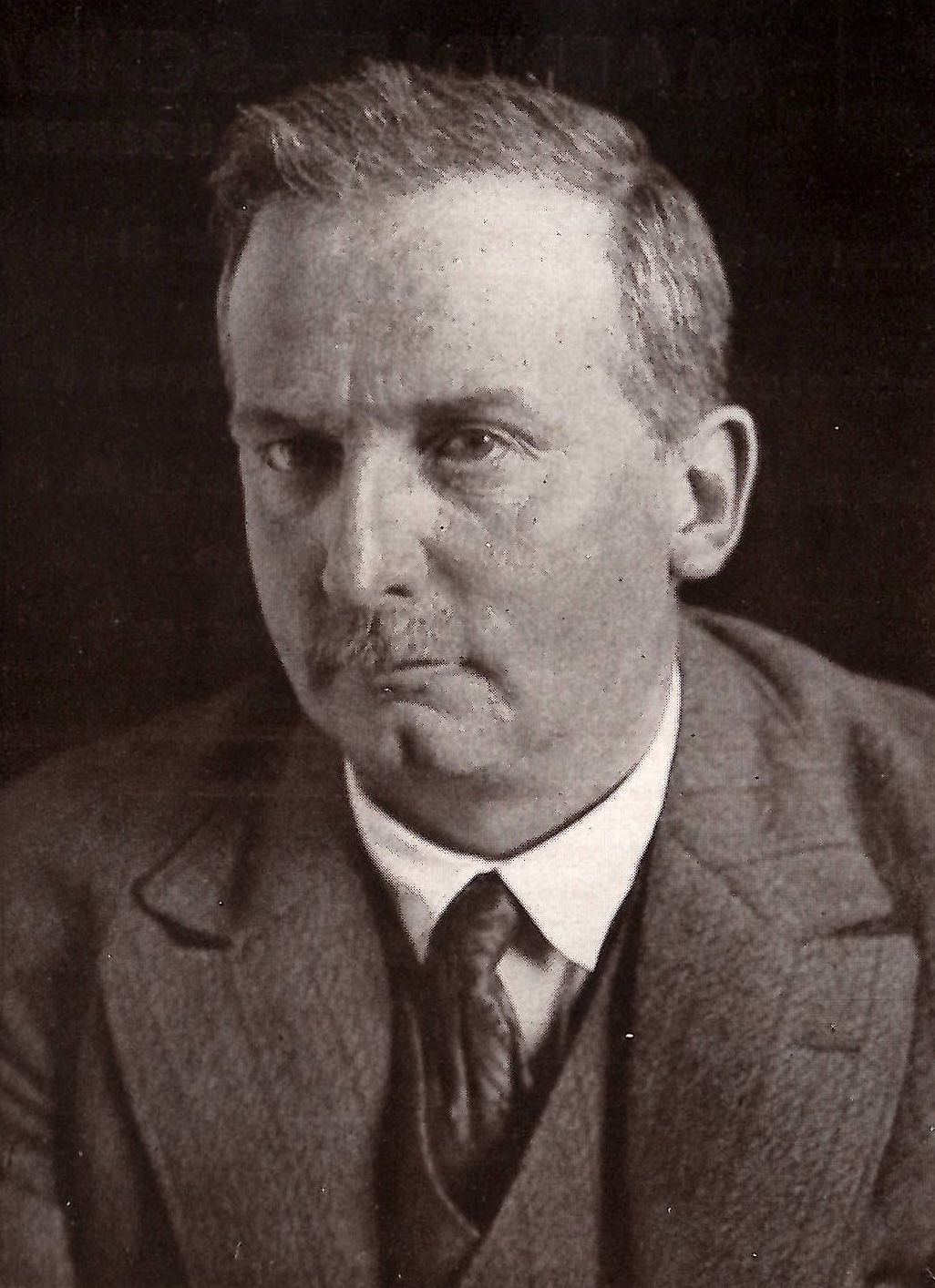
Julius Weismann

Julius Weismann (26 December 1879 – 22 December 1950) was a German pianist, conductor, and composer.

== Biography ==
Weismann was born in Freiburg im Breisgau. He studied with Josef Rheinberger and Ludwig Thuille. As a composer, he left over 150 opus numbers and numerous works without opus number. His works include six operas, three symphonies, three piano concertos, four violin concertos, eleven string quartets (two of these recently recorded in string orchestra arrangement on a cpo recording), piano music, chamber works (including a violin sonata) and about 200 lieder.

Weismann's six operas were:

- Schwanenweiß (1920, premiered 1923), libretto after August Strindberg
- Ein Traumspiel (1924, premiered 1925), libretto after A. Strindberg
- Leonce und Lena (1924, premiered 1925), after a text by Georg Büchner
- Regina del Lago (1926, premiered 1928), libretto by Erica Stuber after a text by Walter Calé
- Die Gespenstersonate (The Ghost Sonata), libretto after A. Strindberg (1930)
- Die pfiffige Magd (1938, premiered 1939), libretto after Ludvig Holberg

Weismann was also a teacher, whose students included Hans Heinsheimer.

From 1934 Julius Weismann was one of the honorary chairmen of the "Working Group of National Socialist Composers".

He died in Singen am Hohentweil, Lake Constance.
