= Richard Bonynge =

Australian conductor and pianist (born 1930)

Richard Bonynge AO, CBE
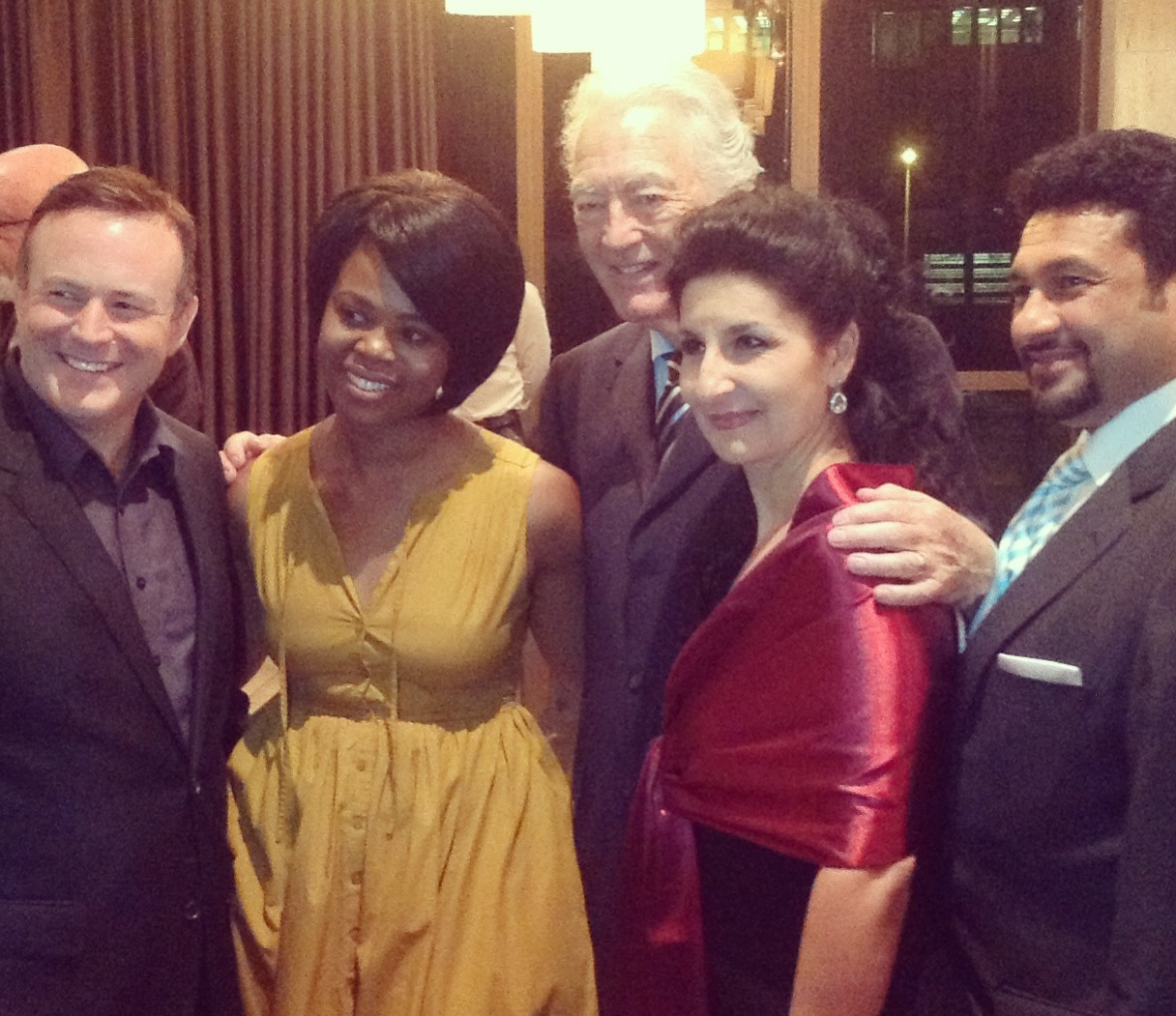
- Tenor Colin Lee, soprano Pretty Yende, Bonynge, mezzo-soprano Violina Anguelov and baritone George Stevens at a concert performance of Lucia di Lammermoor in Cape Town in April 2013
- Born: 29 September 1930 (age 96); Epping, New South Wales, Australia
- Occupations: Conductor, pianist
- Years active: 1962–present
- Spouse: Joan Sutherland (m. 1954; died 2010)
- Children: 1

Richard Alan Bonynge (/ˈbɒnɪŋ/ BONN-ing; born 29 September 1930) is an Australian conductor and pianist. He is the widower of Australian dramatic coloratura soprano Dame Joan Sutherland. Bonynge conducted virtually all of Sutherland's operatic performances from 1962 until her retirement in 1990.

== Biography ==
Bonynge was born in Epping, a suburb of Sydney, and educated at Sydney Boys High School before studying piano at the Sydney Conservatorium of Music and gaining a scholarship to the Royal College of Music in London, where his piano teacher was Herbert Fryer. He gave up his music scholarship, continuing his private piano studies, and became a coach for singers. One of these was Joan Sutherland, whom he had accompanied in Australia. They married in 1954 and became a duo, performing operatic recitals until 1962. When the scheduled conductor for a recital of operatic arias became ill and the replacement conductor was involved in a car accident, Bonynge stepped in and, from that time on, he conducted virtually all of his wife's performances.

His debut as an opera conductor took place in 1963 in Vancouver, where he conducted Faust. The same year, also in Vancouver, he conducted Norma for the first time, starring Sutherland and Marilyn Horne. He conducted the English Chamber Orchestra in many recordings.

While researching Massenet and Italian bel canto composers, Bonynge discovered Massenet's own statement that his opera Esclarmonde was his "best achievement". This made Bonynge curious, because Esclarmonde had sunk into almost total oblivion and had hardly been performed at all since the end of the 19th century. He obtained a tattered vocal score of it in Paris, and subsequently bought the full orchestral score at an auction in New York City. Although Sutherland was initially sceptical about Esclarmonde, Bonynge became an enthusiast of the work and eventually convinced her that she should perform the role of Esclarmonde herself. The San Francisco Opera and Metropolitan Opera premieres of Esclarmonde took place in 1974 and 1976 respectively.

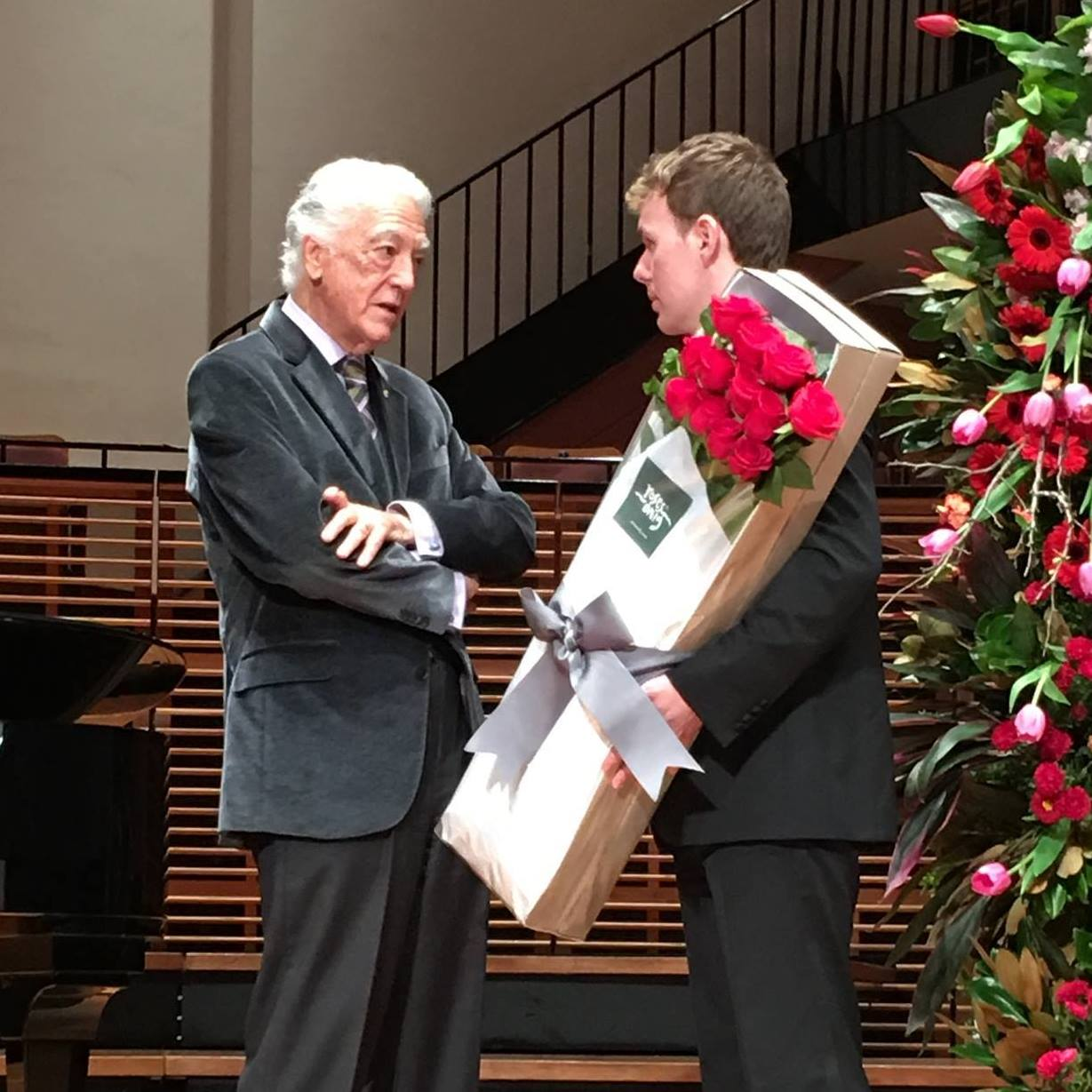
Richard Bonynge and winner Alasdair Kent at the Joan Sutherland & Richard Bonynge Foundation Bel Canto Award in 2016

In 1977 he was the founding music director of the Vancouver Opera Orchestra, (Note: Until then, musicians from the Vancouver Symphony Orchestra had played in the pit without forming a separate organization) when he conducted Le roi de Lahore there (in which his wife also took part).

Bonynge made his Metropolitan Opera debut on 12 December 1966, and his last performance there was on 6 April 1991. Most of his conducting there between 1966 and 1987 was with Sutherland singing. From the 1960s until the early 1970s, his speciality was music of the 18th and early 19th century, mostly bel canto repertoire of Rossini, Bellini and Donizetti. Bonynge gradually added middle Verdi (La traviata, Rigoletto, Il trovatore), Offenbach (Les Contes d'Hoffmann), and Massenet (Esclarmonde and Werther).

Bonynge has recorded extensively in the ballet genre: Delibes's three ballets – La Source, Coppélia, Sylvia; Riccardo Drigo's The Magic Flute and Le Réveil de Flore; Jacques Offenbach's Le papillon; Friedrich Burgmüller's La Péri; and Tchaikovsky's three ballets – Swan Lake, The Sleeping Beauty, The Nutcracker. One of Bonynge's most valuable contributions to ballet music is a 10 CD "Compendium of Ballet Rarities", rarely recorded but often performed by established ballet companies, such as several famous Pas de deux and ballets performed in operas.

His recordings also include some works with no operatic or balletic associations, such as the Harp Concerto in E-flat by Reinhold Glière, with harpist Osian Ellis.

Commencing in 2007, he has conducted a series of performances in a few opera houses around the US (Florida Grand Opera, Michigan Opera Theatre), and now is mostly involved with the Opera Australia company (Lucia di Lammermoor in August 2008, and in 2006 for Opera Queensland; I Capuleti e i Montecchi in Melbourne and Sydney in middle of 2009).

He lives in Les Avants, Switzerland, and maintains a home in Sydney. He is regularly involved in the philanthropic activities of the Joan Sutherland & Richard Bonynge Foundation, often chairing the panel of judges for their annual Bel Canto Award.

== Videography ==
- The Metropolitan Opera Centennial Gala (1983), Deutsche Grammophon DVD, 00440-073-4538

== Honours and awards ==
Bonynge was made a Commander of the Order of the British Empire for his services to music in 1977. In 1983, he was made Officer of the Order of Australia, and in 1989 a Commandeur de l'Ordre des Arts et des Lettres.

On 26 January 2012, Bonynge was promoted within the Order of Australia to Companion, for "eminent service to the performing arts as an acclaimed conductor and musical scholar, to classical singing and the promotion of opera, and through the collection and preservation of operatic manuscripts."

On 28th October, 2026 Bonynge was awarded the Petipa Award for outstanding talent and commitment to preserving classical ballet music.

=== ARIA Music Awards ===
The ARIA Music Awards is an annual awards ceremony that recognises excellence, innovation, and achievement across all genres of Australian music. They commenced in 1987.

Year	Nominee / work	Award	Result	Ref.
2000	Amoureuse: Sacred and Profane Arias (with Rosamund Illing and Australian Opera and Ballet Orchestra)	Best Classical Album	Nominated	
2006	Piano Concertos: Tchaikovsky, Grieg (with Simon Tedeschi & The Queensland Orchestra)	Best Classical Album	Nominated	

=== Bernard Heinze Memorial Award ===
The Sir Bernard Heinze Memorial Award is given to a person who has made an outstanding contribution to music in Australia.

Year	Nominee / work	Award	Result	Ref.
2008	Richard Bonynge	Sir Bernard Heinze Memorial Award	awarded	
