= Joan Sutherland =

Australian soprano (1926–2010)

Dame Joan Sutherland OM AC DBE
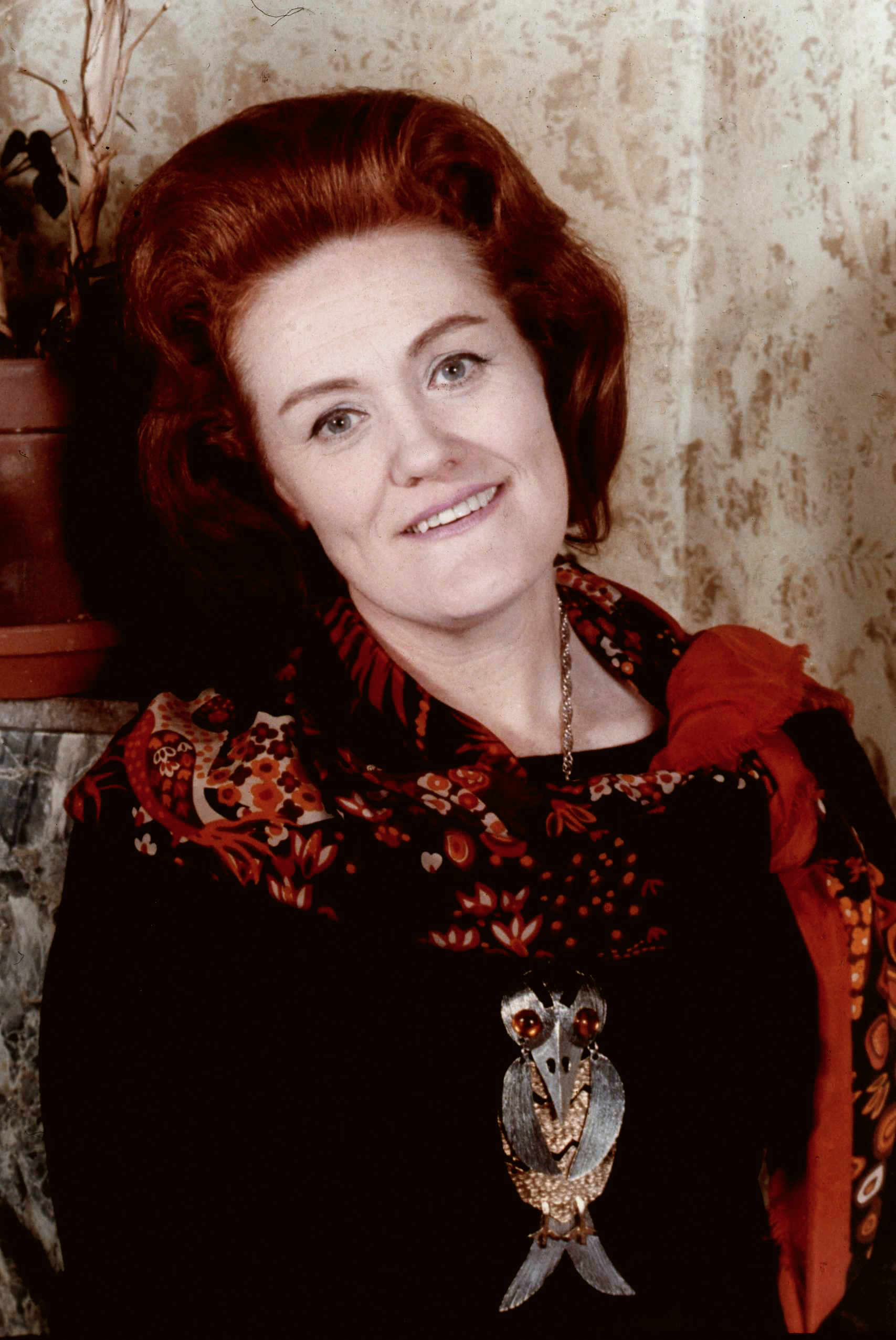
- Sutherland in 1975
- Born: Joan Alston Sutherland; 7 November 1926; Sydney, New South Wales, Australia
- Died: 10 October 2010 (aged 83); Les Avants, Vaud, Switzerland
- Education: St Catherine's School, Waverley; Royal College of Music
- Occupation: Operatic lyric coloratura soprano
- Years active: 1947–1990
- Spouse: Richard Bonynge (m. 1954)
- Children: 1
- Awards: (Sydney) Sun Aria (1949); Grammy Award for Best Classical Vocal Solo (1961); Australian of the Year (1961); Kennedy Center Honors (2004); JC Williamson Award (2005); Gramophone Hall of Fame (2012)

Dame Joan Alston Sutherland OM AC DBE (7 November 1926 – 10 October 2010) was an Australian dramatic coloratura soprano known for her contribution to the renaissance of the bel canto repertoire from the late 1950s to the 1980s.

She possessed a voice combining agility, accurate intonation, pinpoint staccatos, a trill and a strong upper register, although music critics complained about her poor diction.

Sutherland was the first Australian to win a Grammy Award, for the year 1961 Best Classical Performance – Vocal Soloist (with or without orchestra) presented in 1962.

She was known as La Stupenda (Italian for 'The Stupendous One') and is widely regarded as one of the greatest sopranos of all time.

== Early and personal life ==
Joan Sutherland was born in Sydney, Australia, to Scottish parents and attended St Catherine's School in the suburb of Waverley, New South Wales. As a child, she listened to and imitated her mother's singing exercises. Her mother, a mezzo-soprano, had taken voice lessons but never considered singing as a career. Sutherland was 18 years old when she began seriously studying voice with John and Aida Dickens. She made her concert debut in Sydney, as Dido in a production of Henry Purcell's Dido and Aeneas, in 1947.

In 1949, as well as winning Australia's most important competition, the (Sydney) Sun Aria, Joan Sutherland came third after the baritone Ronal Jackson in radio 3DB's £1,000 Mobil Quest; Joan Sutherland won the Mobil Quest the next year (1950).

In 1951, she made her stage debut in Eugene Goossens's Judith. She then went to London to further her studies at the Opera School of the Royal College of Music with Clive Carey. She was engaged by the Royal Opera House, Covent Garden, as a utility soprano, and made her debut there on 28 October 1952, as the First Lady in The Magic Flute, followed in November by a few performances as Clotilde in Vincenzo Bellini's opera Norma, with Maria Callas as Norma.

Being an admirer of Kirsten Flagstad in her early career, she trained to be a Wagnerian dramatic soprano. In December 1952, she sang her first leading role at the Royal Opera House, Amelia in Un ballo in maschera. Other roles included Agathe in Der Freischütz, the Countess in The Marriage of Figaro, Desdemona in Otello, Gilda in Rigoletto, Eva in Die Meistersinger von Nürnberg, and Pamina in The Magic Flute. In 1953, she sang the role of Lady Rich in Benjamin Britten's Gloriana a few months after its world premiere, and created the role of Jenifer in Michael Tippett's The Midsummer Marriage, on 27 January 1955.

Sutherland married Australian conductor and pianist Richard Bonynge on 16 October 1954. Their son, Adam, was born in 1956. Bonynge gradually convinced her that Wagner might not be her Fach, and that since she could produce high notes and coloratura with great ease, she should perhaps explore the bel canto repertoire. She eventually settled in this Fach, spending most of her career singing dramatic coloratura soprano.

== Career ==
In 1957, she appeared in Handel's Alcina with the Handel Opera Society, and sang selections from Donizetti's Emilia di Liverpool in a radio broadcast. The following year she sang Donna Anna in Don Giovanni in Vancouver.

In 1959, Sutherland was invited to sing Lucia di Lammermoor at the Royal Opera House in a production conducted by Tullio Serafin and staged by Franco Zeffirelli. The role of Edgardo was sung by her fellow Australian Kenneth Neate, who had replaced the scheduled tenor at short notice. In 1960, she recorded the album The Art of the Prima Donna: the double LP set won the Grammy Award for Best Classical Performance – Vocal Soloist in 1962. The album was added to the National Film and Sound Archive's Sounds of Australia registry in 2011.

Sutherland sang Lucia to great acclaim in Paris in 1960 and, in 1961, at La Scala and the Metropolitan Opera. For her Met performance of Lucia di Lammermoor, standees began lining up at 7:30 that morning. Her singing of the Mad Scene drew a 12-minute ovation. In 1960 she sang Alcina at La Fenice. Sutherland would soon be praised as La Stupenda in newspapers around the world. Later that year (1960), Sutherland sang Alcina at the Dallas Opera, with which she made her US debut.

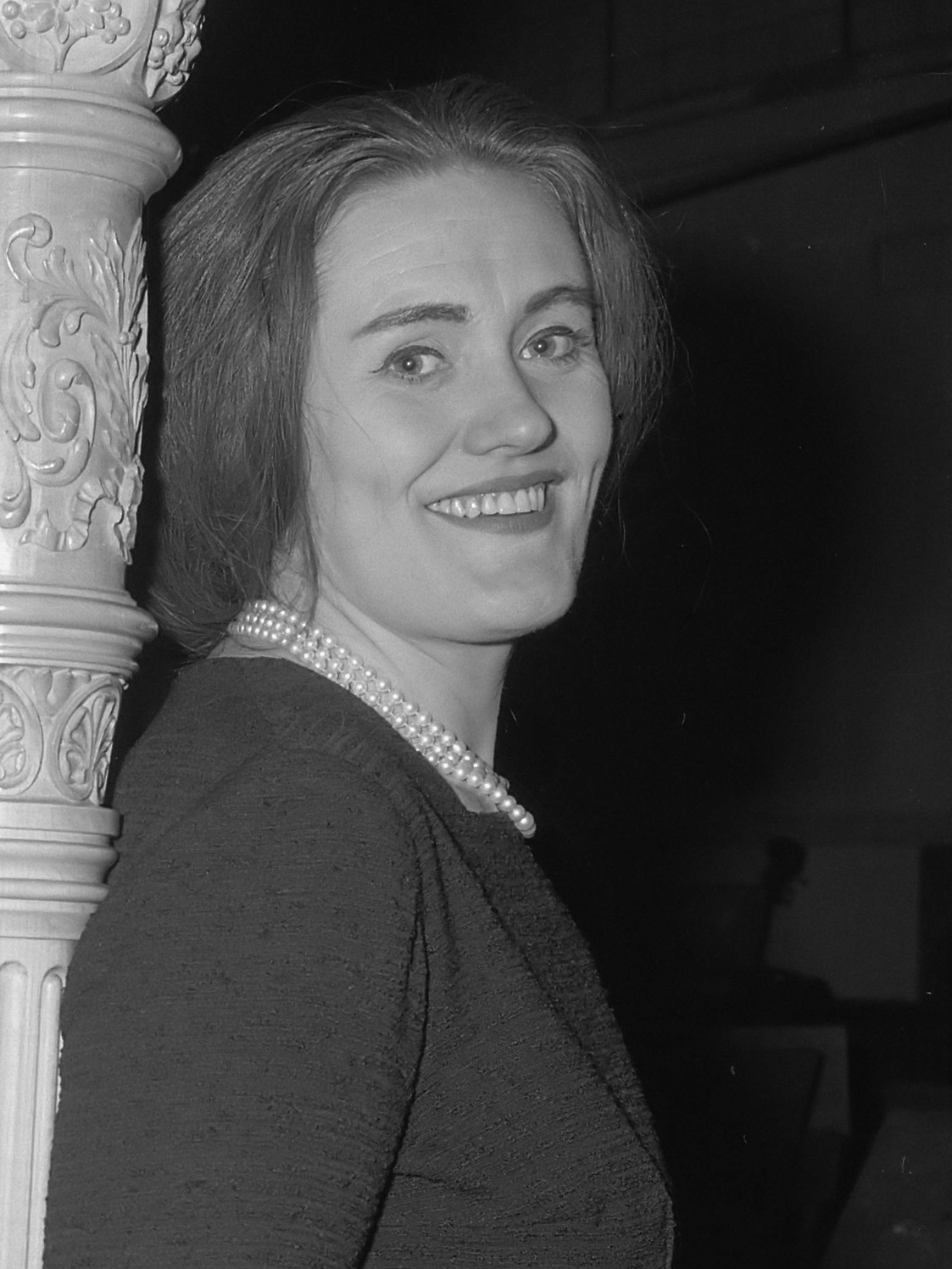
Sutherland in 1962

Her Metropolitan Opera debut took place on 26 November 1961, when she sang Lucia. After a total of 223 performances in a number of different operas, her last appearance there was a concert on 12 March 1989. During the 1978–82 period, her relationship with the Met deteriorated when Sutherland had to decline the role of Constanze in Mozart's Die Entführung aus dem Serail, more than a year before the rehearsals were scheduled to start. The opera house management then declined to stage the operetta The Merry Widow especially for her, as requested; subsequently, she did not perform at the Met during that time at all, even though a production of Rossini's Semiramide had also been planned, but later she returned there to sing in other operas.

During the 1960s, Sutherland added the heroines of bel canto to her repertoire: Violetta in Verdi's La traviata, Amina in Bellini's La sonnambula and Elvira in Bellini's I puritani in 1960; the title role in Bellini's Beatrice di Tenda in 1961; Marguerite de Valois in Meyerbeer's Les Huguenots and the title role in Rossini's Semiramide in 1962; Norma in Bellini's Norma and Cleopatra in Handel's Giulio Cesare in 1963. In 1966 she added Marie in Donizetti's La fille du régiment.

In 1965, Sutherland toured Australia with the Sutherland-Williamson Opera Company. Accompanying her was a young tenor named Luciano Pavarotti.

During the 1970s, Sutherland strove to improve her diction, which had often been criticised, and increase the expressiveness of her interpretations. She continued to add dramatic bel canto roles to her repertoire, such as Donizetti's Maria Stuarda and Lucrezia Borgia, as well as Massenet's Esclarmonde. With Pavarotti she made a studio-recording of Turandot in 1972 conducted by Zubin Mehta, though she never performed the role on stage.

Sutherland's early recordings show her to be possessed of a crystal-clear voice and excellent diction. However, by the early 1960s her voice lost some of this clarity in the middle register, and she often came under fire for having unclear diction. Some have attributed this to sinus surgery; however, her major sinus surgery was done in 1959, immediately after her breakthrough Lucia at Covent Garden. In fact, her first commercial recording of the first and final scene of Lucia reveals her voice and diction to be just as clear as prior to the sinus procedure. Her husband Richard Bonynge stated in an interview that her "mushy diction" occurred while striving to achieve perfect legato. According to him, it is because she earlier had a very Germanic "un-legato" way of singing.

During the 1980s, Sutherland added Anna Bolena, Amalia in I masnadieri, and Adriana Lecouvreur to her repertoire, and repeated Esclarmonde at the Royal Opera House performances in November and December 1983. Her last full-length dramatic performance was as Marguerite de Valois (Les Huguenots) at the Sydney Opera House in 1990, at the age of 63, where she sang Home Sweet Home for her encore. Her last public appearance, however, took place in a gala performance of Die Fledermaus on New Year's Eve, 1990, at Covent Garden, where she was accompanied by her colleagues Luciano Pavarotti and the mezzo-soprano Marilyn Horne. According to her own words, given in an interview with The Guardian newspaper in 2002, her biggest achievement was to sing the title role in Esclarmonde. She considered those performances and recordings her best.

== Retirement years ==
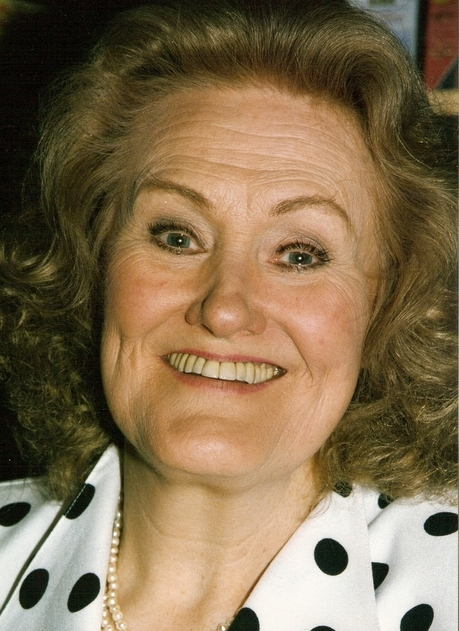
Sutherland in 1990

After retirement, Sutherland made relatively few public appearances, preferring a quiet life at her home in Les Avants, Switzerland. One exception was her 1994 address at a lunch organised by Australians for Constitutional Monarchy, when Sutherland commented: "It also upsets me that it is such a damned job to get an Australian passport now – you have to go to be interviewed by a Chinese or an Indian. I'm not particularly racist, but I find it ludicrous." Her criticism caused controversy.

On 3 July 2008, she fell and broke both legs while gardening at her home in Switzerland.

== Film and television ==
In 1972, Sutherland starred in Who's Afraid of Opera, a six-part children's television series, in which she performs selections from six different operas to a puppet audience.

Sutherland later had a leading role as Mother Rudd in the 1995 comedy film Dad and Dave: On Our Selection opposite Leo McKern and Geoffrey Rush.

== Publications ==
In 1997, she published an autobiography, A Prima Donna's Progress. It received mixed reviews for its literary merits. Library Journal stated,

Opera superstar Dame Joan Sutherland gives an exhaustive account of her performing and recording career over four decades. From her early years in Australia and with the Covent Garden company in London, to her daunting schedule at most of the major opera houses of the world, we read endlessly of where, when, and with whom she sang which roles. We're shown a sensible woman and a hard-working artist, with a healthy ego tempered by a sense of humor that is often self-deprecating.

The work includes a complete list of all her performances, with full cast lists.

Her official biography, Joan Sutherland: The Authorised Biography, published in February 1994, was written by Norma Major, wife of the then prime minister John Major.

In 2002, she appeared at a dinner in London to accept the Royal Philharmonic Society's gold medal. She gave an interview to The Guardian in which she lamented the lack of technique in young opera singers and the dearth of good teachers. By this time she was no longer giving master classes herself; when asked by Italian journalists in May 2007 why this was, she replied: "Because I'm 80 years old and I really don't want to have anything to do with opera any more, although I do sit on the juries of singing competitions." The Cardiff Singer of the World competition was the one that Sutherland was most closely associated with after her retirement. She began her regular involvement with the event in 1993, serving on the jury five consecutive times and later, in 2003, becoming its patron.

== Death ==
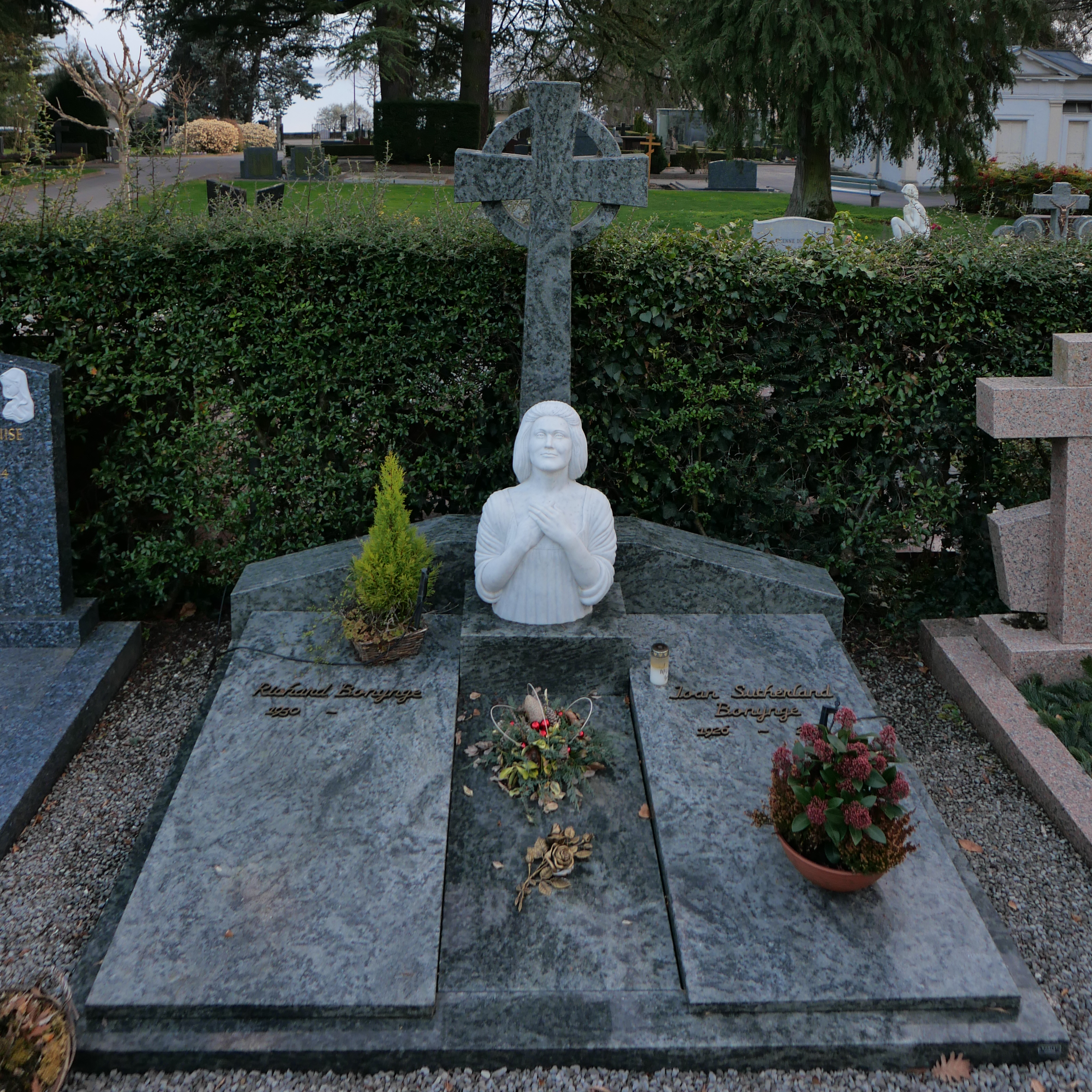
Sutherland's grave (right) with a bust of her at the cemetery of Clarens in the Swiss canton of Vaud with Lake Geneva in the background. On the left is the future final resting place of her widower.

On 11 October 2010, Sutherland's family announced that she had died at her home at Les Avants in Switzerland the previous day of cardiopulmonary failure – "the heart just gave out...When it came to the point that she physically couldn't do anything, she didn't want to live any more. She wanted to go, she was happy to go, and in the end she died very, very peacefully." Though she recovered from her fall in 2008, it led to more serious health problems. A statement from her family said "She's had a long life and gave a lot of pleasure to a lot of people." Sutherland had requested a small, private funeral service. Her funeral was held on 14 October and Opera Australia planned a tribute to her. Artistic director of Opera Australia, Lyndon Terracini, said "We won't see her like again. She had a phenomenal range, size and quality of voice. We simply don't hear that any more." Sutherland is survived by her husband, son, daughter-in-law and two grandchildren.

Australian Prime Minister Julia Gillard said, "She was of course one of the great opera voices of the 20th century," adding that Sutherland showed a lot of "quintessential Australian values. She was described as down to earth despite her status as a diva. On behalf of all Australians I would like to extend my condolences to her husband Richard and son Adam and their extended family at this difficult time. I know many Australians will be reflecting on her life's work today."

== Memorial service ==
A State Memorial Service on 9 November 2010, arranged by Opera Australia, was held at the Sydney Opera House. Speakers at the service were Julia Gillard, Prime Minister of Australia; Professor Marie Bashir, the Governor of New South Wales; Moffatt Oxenbould, the former Artistic Director of Opera Australia; and Sutherland's son, Adam Bonynge. The service was broadcast live by both ABC1 television and ABC Classic FM (radio) and streamed globally by ABC News 24. Further memorial services were held in Westminster Abbey on 15 February 2011, and in New York City on 24 May 2011, which was hosted by Marilyn Horne with an appearance by Richard Bonynge. In attendance were Sherrill Milnes, Norman Ayrton, Regina Resnik, and Spiro Malas.

== Voice ==
=== Vocal timbre ===
External audio
- Joan Sutherland as Donna Anna in Mozart's opera Don Giovanni with Carlo Maria Giulini conducting the Philharmonia Orchestra in 1961 – via Internet Archive

Described as "fresh," "silvery" and "bell-like" until 1963, Joan Sutherland's voice later became "golden" and "warm"; music critic John Yohalem writes it was like "molten honey caressing the line". In his book Voices, Singers and Critics, John Steane writes that "if the tonal spectrum ranges from bright to dark, Sutherland's place would be near the centre, which is no doubt another reason for her wide appeal." According to John Yohalem, "Her lower register was a cello register, Stradivarius-hued." Her voice was full and rounded even in her highest notes, which were brilliant, but sometimes "slightly acid".

In 1971, Time writes an article comparing Sutherland and Beverly Sills,

Originally bright and youthful-sounding, her voice darkened as she transformed herself into a coloratura. There is a suggestion of Callas' famous middle register in Sutherland's vocal center—a tone that sounds as if the singer were singing into the neck of a resonant bottle. Today the Sutherland voice towers like a natural wonder, unique as Niagara or Mount Everest. Sills' voice is made of more ordinary stuff; what she shares with Callas is an abandon in hurling herself into fiery emotional music and a willingness to sacrifice vocal beauty for dramatic effect. Sutherland deals in vocal velvet, Sills in emotional dynamite. Sutherland's voice is much larger, but its plush monochrome robs it of carrying power in dramatic moments. Sills' multicolored voice, though smaller, projects better and has a cutting edge that can slice through the largest orchestra and chorus. Sometimes, indeed, it verges on shrillness. [...] In slow, legato music, Sills has a superior sense of rhythm and clean attack to keep things moving; Sutherland's more flaccid beat and her style of gliding from note to note often turn song into somnolence. Sills' diction in English, French and Italian is superb; Sutherland's vocal placement produces mushy diction in any language, but makes possible an even more seamless beauty of tone than is available to Sills.

Describing Sutherland's voice, John Yohalem writes:

On my personal color scale, which runs from a voluptuous red (Tebaldi) or blood-orange (Price) or purple (Caballé) or red-purple (Troyanos) to white-hot (Rysanek) or runny yellow-green (Sills), Sutherland is among the "blue" sopranos – which has nothing to do with "blues" in the pop sense of the term. (Ella Fitzgerald had a blue voice, but Billie Holiday had a blues voice, which is very different.) Diana Damrau is blue. Mirella Freni is blue-ish. Karita Mattila is ice blue. Régine Crespin was deep blue shading to violet. Sutherland was true blue (like the Garter ribbon). There is a coolness here that can take on the passion in the music but does not inject passion where the music lacks it, could possibly use it.

=== Vocal category, size and range ===
External audio
- Joan Sutherland as Elvira in Vincenzo Bellini's opera I puritani with Richard Bonynge conducting the London Symphony Orchestra with Luciano Pavarotti as Arturo in 1974 – via Internet Archive

Although she is generally described as a dramatic coloratura soprano, "categorizing Sutherland's voice has always been extremely difficult, both the size and the sound present definitional problems [...] Aside from singing some roles popular among coloratura sopranos, Sutherland's voice could not be more different."

In a 1961 profile in The New York Times Magazine, Sutherland said she initially had "a big rather wild voice" that was not heavy enough for Wagner, although she did not realise this until she heard "Wagner sung as it should be."

Regarding the size of Sutherland's voice, Opera Britannia praise "a voice of truly heroic dimensions singing bel canto. It is doubtful if any soprano in this repertoire has fielded quite so much power and tone as Dame Joan, and this includes Callas and Tetrazzini. The contrast with other sopranos who sing the same roles is appropriately enough stupendous, with rival prima donnas producing small pin points of sound as compared to Sutherland's seemingly endless cascades of full tone." In 1972, music critic Winthrop Sargeant describes her voice "as large as that of a top-ranking Wagnerian soprano" in The New Yorker. French soprano Natalie Dessay states, "She had a huge, huge voice and she was able to lighten suddenly and to take this quick coloratura and she had also the top high notes like a coloratura soprano but with a big, huge voice, which is very rare."

Sutherland's vocal range extended from G below the staff (G_{3}) to high F (F_{6}), or high F-sharp (F♯_{6}), although she never sang this last note in a public performance.

== Honours ==
During her career and after, Sutherland received many honours and awards. She was made a Commander of the Order of the British Empire (CBE) in the 1961 Birthday Honours. That year she was named the Australian of the Year. Sutherland is a Distinguished Member of the Sigma Alpha Iota International Music Fraternity.

In the 1975 Queen's Birthday Honours, she was in the first group of people to be named Companions of the Order of Australia (AC) (the order had been created only in February 1975). She was elevated within the Order of the British Empire from Commander to Dame Commander (DBE) in the 1979 New Year Honours.

On 29 November 1991, the Queen bestowed on Sutherland the Order of Merit (OM).

== Awards ==
In 1992, Sutherland was a founding patron and active supporter of the Tait Memorial Trust in London. A charity established by Isla Baring OAM, the daughter of Sir Frank Tait of J. C. Williamson's to support young Australian performing artists in the UK. Sir Frank Tait was the Australian impresario who created and managed the Sutherland-Williamson tour of Australia in 1965.

Sutherland House and the Dame Joan Sutherland Centre, both at St Catherine's School, Waverley, and the Joan Sutherland Performing Arts Centre (JSPAC), Penrith, are all named in her honour.

John Paul College, a leading private school in Queensland, Australia, dedicated its newly established facility the Dame Joan Sutherland Music Centre in 1991. Sutherland visited the centre for its opening and again in 1996.

She received the Lifetime Contribution Award in 2001 Echo Klassik. In January 2004 she received the Australia Post Australian Legends Award which honours Australians who have contributed to the Australian identity and culture. Two stamps featuring Joan Sutherland were issued on Australia Day 2004 to mark the award. Later in 2004, she received a Kennedy Center Honor for her outstanding achievement throughout her career.

On 22 May 2007, the year of the centenary of the birth of soprano Lina Pagliughi, she received the award La Siòla d'Oro at the Teatro Comunale di Bologna.

In 2012, Sutherland was voted into the first Hall of Fame of the magazine Gramophone.

In 2024, she was recognised in the Australian Women in Music Awards and was inducted into the AWMA Honour Roll. The award was accepted by Sutherland's granddaughter.

== Roles ==
Sutherland performed live the following complete roles.

First performance	Composer	Work	Role	House	Conductor	Director	Remarks
20 June 1947	Handel	Acis and Galatea	Galatea	Eastwood Masonic Hall, Sydney			Concert performance
30 August 1947	Purcell	Dido and Aeneas	Dido	Lyceum Club, Sydney			Concert performance
15 July 1950	Handel	Samson	Dalila and Israelite woman	Sydney Town Hall			Concert performance; Sutherland made her professional role debut as the Israelite woman on 14 October 1958
9 July 1951	Goossens	Judith	Judith	Sydney Conservatorium of Music	Goossens		Sutherland's first complete staged opera
16 July 1952	Puccini	Il tabarro	Giorgetta	Parry Theatre, RCM	Richard Austin	Peter Rice/Pauline Elliot	
28 October 1952	Mozart	The Magic Flute	First lady	ROH, Covent Garden	Pritchard	Messel	Sutherland's professional debut
3 November 1952	Verdi	Aida	High Priestess	ROH, Covent Garden	Barbirolli	Cruddas	
8 November 1952	Bellini	Norma	Clotilde	ROH, Covent Garden	Gui	Barlow	
29 December 1952	Verdi	Un ballo in maschera	Amelia	ROH, Covent Garden	Pritchard	Barlow/Stone	Sutherland's first leading role
24 February 1953	Mozart	The Marriage of Figaro	Countess Almaviva	ROH tour, Edinburgh	J Gibson	Gerard	
13 May 1953	Strauss	Elektra	Overseer	ROH, Covent Garden	Kleiber	Lambert	
11 August 1953	Britten	Gloriana	Lady Rich	ROH tour, Bulawayo			
19 October 1953	Wagner	Die Walküre	Helmwige	ROH, Covent Garden	Stiedry	Pemberton	
2 November 1953	Bizet	Carmen	Frasquita	ROH, Covent Garden	Pritchard	Wakhévitch	
4 February 1954	Verdi	Aida	Aida	ROH, Covent Garden	E Young	Cruddas	
23 March 1954	Weber	Der Freischütz	Agathe	ROH, Covent Garden	Downes	Furse	
30 April 1954	Piccinni	La buona figliuola	Lucinda		Mackerras		BBC radio broadcast
27 May 1954	Wagner	Der Ring des Nibelungen	Woglinde and Woodbird	ROH, Covent Garden	Stiedry	Hurry	Sutherland also sang the role of Helmwige, which she had sung previously; the other dates of the cycle were 2, 8, and 17 June
17 November 1954	Offenbach	Les contes d'Hoffmann	Antonia	ROH, Covent Garden	Downes	Wakhévitch	
27 January 1955	Tippett	The Midsummer Marriage	Jenifer	ROH, Covent Garden	Pritchard	Hepworth	World premiere; Sutherland created the role
28 February 1955	Offenbach	Les contes d'Hoffmann	Giulietta	ROH tour, Glasgow	Downes	Wakhévitch	
19 June 1955	Offenbach	Les contes d'Hoffmann	Olympia	ROH, Covent Garden	Downes	Wakhévitch	
30 September 1955	Weber	Euryanthe	Euryanthe		Stiedry		BBC radio broadcast
30 October 1955	Bizet	Carmen	Micaela	ROH, Covent Garden	Downes	Wakhévitch	
11 March 1956	Mozart	La clemenza di Tito	Vitellia		Pritchard		BBC radio broadcast
10 November 1956	Mozart	The Magic Flute	Pamina	ROH, Covent Garden	J Gibson	Messel	
28 January 1957	Wagner	Die Meistersinger von Nürnberg	Eva	ROH, Covent Garden	Kubelík	Wakhévitch	
19 March 1957	Handel	Alcina	Alcina	St Pancras Town Hall	Farncombe		
8 June 1957	Verdi	Rigoletto	Gilda	ROH, Covent Garden	Downes	Gellner	
5 July 1957	Mozart	Der Schauspieldirektor	Mme Hertz	Glyndebourne Festival Opera	Balkwill	Rice	
16 August 1957	Scarlatti	Mitridate Eupatore	Laodice		Appia		BBC radio broadcast
8 September 1957	Donizetti	Emilia di Liverpool	Emilia		Pritchard		BBC radio broadcast
21 December 1957	Verdi	Otello	Desdemona	ROH, Covent Garden	Downes	Wakhévitch	
16 January 1958	Poulenc	Dialogues of the Carmelites	Mme Lidoine	ROH, Covent Garden	Kubelík	Wakhévitch	
24 May 1958	Haydn	Applausus Musicus	Temperantia		Newstone		BBC radio broadcast
26 July 1958	Mozart	Don Giovanni	Donna Anna	Vancouver Opera	Goldschmidt	Maximowna	
17 February 1959	Donizetti	Lucia di Lammermoor	Lucia	ROH, Covent Garden	Serafin	Zeffirelli	This performance marked the beginning of Sutherland's international career
24 June 1959	Handel	Rodelinda	Rodelinda	Sadler's Wells Theatre	Farncombe	Pidcock	
8 January 1960	Verdi	La traviata	Violetta Valéry	ROH, Covent Garden	Santi	Fedorovitch	
24 May 1960	Bellini	I puritani	Elvira	Glyndebourne Festival Opera	Gui	Heeley	
19 October 1960	Bellini	La sonnambula	Amina	ROH, Covent Garden	Serafin	Sanjust	
21 February 1961	Bellini	Beatrice di Tenda	Beatrice	New York Town Hall	Rescigno		Concert performance; Sutherland first performed this role on stage on 10 May 1961
4 January 1962	Mozart	The Magic Flute	The Queen of the Night	ROH, Covent Garden	Klemperer	Eisler	
28 May 1962	Meyerbeer	Les Huguenots	Maguerite de Valois	La Scala	Gavazzeni	Nicola Benois	
17 December 1962	Rossini	Semiramide	Semiramide	La Scala	Santini		
20 June 1963	Handel	Giulio Cesare	Cleopatra	Sadler's Wells Theatre	Farncombe	Warre	
17 October 1963	Bellini	Norma	Norma	Vancouver Opera	Bonynge	McLance/Mess	
9 March 1965	Gounod	Faust	Marguerite	Connecticut Opera	Bonynge	Rome/Brooks van Horne	
2 June 1966	Donizetti	La fille du régiment	Marie	ROH, Covent Garden	Bonynge	Anni/Escoffier	
10 April 1967	Delibes	Lakmé	Lakmé	Seattle Opera	Bonynge		
21 May 1967	Haydn	L'anima del filosofo	Euridice	Theater an der Wien	Bonynge	Ludwig	
12 November 1971	Donizetti	Maria Stuarda	Maria Stuarda	San Francisco Opera	Bonynge	Pizzi	
26 October 1972	Donizetti	Lucrezia Borgia	Lucrezia	Vancouver Opera	Bonynge	Varona	
14 September 1973	J.Strauss II	Die Fledermaus	Rosalinde	San Francisco Opera	Bonynge		
23 October 1974	Massenet	Esclarmonde	Esclarmonde	San Francisco Opera	Bonynge	Montressor	
12 September 1975	Verdi	Il trovatore	Leonora	San Francisco Opera	Bonynge	Hager/Skalicki	
22 April 1976	Lehár	The Merry Widow	Hanna Glavari	Vancouver Opera	Bonynge	Varona	
16 July 1977	Puccini	Suor Angelica	Suor Angelica	Sydney Opera House	Bonynge	Digby	
23 September 1977	Massenet	Le roi de Lahore	Sita	Vancouver Opera	Bonynge	Mariani	
4 July 1979	Mozart	Idomeneo	Elettra	Sydney Opera House	Bonynge	Truscott	
2 July 1980	Verdi	I masnadieri	Amalia	Sydney Opera House	Bonynge	Lees/Stennett	
22 May 1983	Cilea	Adriana Lecouvreur	Adriana	San Diego Opera	Bonynge	O'Hearn/Mess	
22 June 1984	Donizetti	Anna Bolena	Anna Bolena	Canadian Opera Company, Toronto	Bonynge	Pascoe/Stennett	
4 October 1985	Thomas	Hamlet	Ophélie	Canadian Opera Company, Toronto	Bonynge	Shalicki/Digby/Stennett	

== Recordings ==
Recitals

Sutherland made various recital and lieder recordings, usually with Richard Bonynge, many of them originally double-LPs. Some are still available in CD-format.

In 2011 Decca re-released these recitals in a 23-CD set (Complete Decca Studio Recitals, Decca 4783243) comprising:

- Operatic Arias (1959)
- The Art of the Prima Donna (1960) 2CD
- Command Performance (1962) 2CD
- The Age of Bel Canto (with Marilyn Horne and Richard Conrad, 1963) 2CD
- Joy to the World (Christmas Album, 1965)
- The Noël Coward Album (1966)
- Love Live Forever (1966) 2CD
- Romantic French Arias (1969) 2CD
- Songs My Mother Taught Me (1972)
- Operatic Duets (with Luciano Pavarotti, 1976)
- Serate Musicali (1978) 2CD
- Sutherland sings Wagner (1978)
- Sutherland sings Mozart (1979)
- Bel Canto Arias (1985)
- Talking Pictures (1986)
- Romantic Trios, Songs for soprano, horn and piano (1987)
- Rarities and first recordings (1958/59 to 1967/68)

Opera recordings (non-exhaustive)

Vincenzo Bellini

- Beatrice di Tenda—Joan Sutherland (Beatrice), Luciano Pavarotti (Orombello), Cornelius Opthof (Filippo), Josephine Veasey (Agnese), Joseph Ward (Anichino/Rizzardo), Ambrosian Opera Chorus, London Symphony Orchestra, Richard Bonynge, recorded 1966 Decca
- I puritani—Joan Sutherland (Elvira), Pierre Duval (Arturo), Renato Capecchi (Riccardo), Ezio Flagello (Giorgio), Giovanni Fioiani (Gualtiero), Margreta Elkins (Enrichetta), Piero de Palma (Bruno), Coro e Orchestra del Maggio Musicale Fiorentino, Richard Bonynge (conductor)—recorded 1963—Decca 448 969-2 / Decca 467 789-2 (part of a 10-CD set) / London POCL 3965-7
- I puritani—Joan Sutherland (Elvira), Luciano Pavarotti (Arturo), Piero Cappuccilli (Riccardo), Nicolai Ghiaurov (Giorgio), Giancarlo Luccardi (Gualtiero), Anita Caminada (Enrichetta), Renato Cazzaniga (Bruno), Chorus of the Royal Opera, Covent Garden, London Symphony Orchestra—Richard Bonynge, recorded 1973, Decca
- La sonnambula—Joan Sutherland (Amina), Nicola Monti (Elvino), Fernando Corena (Rodolfo), Sylvia Stahlman (Lisa), Margreta Elkins (Teresa), Angelo Mercuriali (Notary), Giovanni Fioiani (Alessio), Coro e Orchestra del Maggio Musicale Fiorentino, Richard Bonynge recorded 1962—Decca 00289 448 9662 6 / 000320702 / 455 823-2—Track listing
- La sonnambula—Joan Sutherland (Amina), Luciano Pavarotti (Elvino), Nicolai Ghiaurov (Rodolfo), Isobel Buchanan (Lisa), Della Jones (Teresa), Piero De Palma (Notaro), John Tomlinson (Alessio), National Philharmonic Orchestra, London Opera Chorus, Richard Bonynge, recorded 1980—Decca 2LH417-424
- Norma—Joan Sutherland (Norma), Marilyn Horne (Adalgisa), John Alexander (Pollione), Richard Cross (Oroveso), Yvonne Minton (Clotilde), Joseph Ward (Flavio), London Symphony Orchestra and Chorus, Richard Bonynge, recorded 1964—Decca
- Norma—Joan Sutherland (Norma), Margreta Elkins (Adalgisa), Ronald Stevens (Pollione), Clifford Grant (Oroveso), Etela Piha (Clotilde), Trevor Brown (Flavio), Opera Australia Chorus, Elizabethan Sydney Orchestra, Richard Bonynge, recorded 1978—DVD Arthaus Musik 100 180
- Norma—Joan Sutherland (Norma), Montserrat Caballé (Adalgisa), Luciano Pavarotti (Pollione), Samuel Ramey (Oroveso), Diana Montague (Clotilde), Kim Begley (Flavio), Chorus and Orchestra of the Welsh National Opera, Richard Bonynge, recorded 1984—Decca

Georges Bizet

- Carmen—Regina Resnik (Carmen), Mario Del Monaco (Don Jose), Joan Sutherland (Micaëla), Tom Krause (Escamillo), Georgette Spanellys (Frasquita), Yvonne Minton (Mercedes), Robert Geay (Zuniga), Jean Prudent (Le Dancaire), Alfred Hallet (Le Remendado), Claude Cales (Morales). Orchestre de la Suisse Romande, recorded 1963

Giovanni Bononcini

- Griselda (highlights)—Joan Sutherland (Griselda), Lauris Elms (Ernesto), Monica Sinclair (Gualtiero), Margreta Elkins (Almirena), Spiro Malas (Rambaldo), Ambrosian Opera Chorus, London Philharmonic Orchestra, Richard Bonynge, recorded 1966. Decca 448 977-2 (coupled with Montezuma)

Francesco Cilea

- Adriana Lecouvreur—Joan Sutherland (Adriana Lecouvreur), Carlo Bergonzi (Maurizio), Francesco Ellero d'Artegna (Il Principe di Bouillon), Cleopatra Ciurca (La Principessa di Bouillon), Leo Nucci (Michonnet), Chorus and Orchestra of the Welsh National Opera, Richard Bonynge, recorded 1988, Decca.

Léo Delibes

- Lakmé—Joan Sutherland (Lakmé), Gabriel Bacquier (Nilakantha), Jane Berbié (Malika), Émile Belcourt (Hadji), Alain Vanzo (Gérald), Monte Carlo Opera Chorus, Orchestre National de l'Opéra de Monte-Carlo, Richard Bonynge, recorded 1967, Decca Records.

Gaetano Donizetti

- Emilia di Liverpool (excerpts) / Lucia di Lammermoor (excerpts)—Joan Sutherland (Lucia), Margreta Elkins (Alisa), Joao Gibin (Edgardo), Tullio Serafin (conductor). Recorded 26 February 1959—Myto Records MCD 91545 (Probably these are excerpts from the same performance as the Melodram recording.)
- Lucia di Lammermoor—Joan Sutherland (Lucia), Renato Cioni (Edgardo), Robert Merrill (Enrico), Cesare Siepi (Raimondo), Chorus & Orchestra of the Accademia di Santa Cecilia, John Pritchard (conductor), Decca, 1961.
- Lucia di Lammermoor—Joan Sutherland (Lucia), Luciano Pavarotti (Edgardo), Sherrill Milnes(Enrico), Nicolai Ghiaurov (Raimondo), Chorus & Orchestra of the Royal Opera House, Covent Garden, Richard Bonynge, Decca, 1971.
- Lucia di Lammermoor—Joan Sutherland (Lucia), João Gibin (Edgardo), John Shaw (Enrico), Joseph Rouleau (Raimondo), Kenneth MacDonald (Arturo), Margreta Elkins (Alisa), Robert Bowman (Normanno), Chorus & Orchestra of the Royal Opera House, Covent Garden, Tullio Serafin, recorded 1959—Golden Melodram GM 50024 or Giuseppe di Stefano GDS 21017 or Bella Voce BLV 107 218 (highlights). 2006 release: Royal Opera House Heritage Series ROHS 002.
- Lucia di Lammermoor—Joan Sutherland (Lucia), André Turp (Edgardo), John Shaw (Enrico), Joseph Rouleau (Raimondo), Kenneth MacDonald (Arturo), Margreta Elkins (Alisa), Edgar Evans (Normanno), Chorus & Orchestra of the Royal Opera House, Covent Garden, John Pritchard, recorded 1961—Celestial Audio CA 345
- Lucia di Lammermoor—Joan Sutherland (Lucia), Richard Tucker (Edgardo), Frank Guarrera (Enrico), Nicola Moscona (Raimondo), Robert Nagy (Normanno), Thelma Votipka (Alisa), Charles Anthony (Arturo), Metropolitan Opera House, conductor: Silvio Varviso. Recorded 9 December 1961 for radio broadcasting.
- La fille du régiment—Joan Sutherland (Marie), Luciano Pavarotti (Tonio), Monica Sinclair (La Marquise de Berkenfield), Jules Bruyère (Hortensius), Spiro Malas (Sulpice), Eric Garrett (Le Caporal), Edith Coates (La Duchesse de Crakentorp), Orchestra & Chorus of the Royal Opera House, Covent Garden, Richard Bonynge. Recorded: Kingsway Hall, London, 17–28 July 1967. Original LP release: SET 372-3 (two LPs), CD release: 414 520-2 DH2 (two CDs).
- L'elisir d'amore—Joan Sutherland (Adina), Luciano Pavarotti (Nemorino), Dominic Cossa (Belcore), Spiro Malas (Dulcamara), Maria Casula (Giannetta), Ambrosian Opera Chorus, English Chamber Orchestra, Richard Bonynge. Recorded: Kingsway Hall, London, 12–23 January and 1–10 July 1970. Original LP release: SET 503-5 (three LPs), CD release: 414 461-2 DH2 (two CDs), CD re-release: 475 7514 DOR2 (two CDs).
- Lucrezia Borgia—Joan Sutherland (Lucrezia Borgia), Ronald Stevens (Gennaro), Margreta Elkins (Maffio Orsini), Richard Allman (Don Alfonso), Robin Donald (Jacopo Liveretto), Lyndon Terracini (Don Apostolo Gazella), Gregory Yurisich (Ascanio Petrucci), Lamberto Furlan (Oloferno Vitellozzo), Pieter Van der Stolk (Gubetta), Graeme Ewer (Rustighello), John Germain (Astolfo), Neville Grave (Un servo), Eddie Wilden (Un coppiere), Jennifer Bermingham (Principessa Negroni), Australian Opera Chorus, Sydney Elizabethan Orchestra, Richard Bonynge, recorded 1977. VHS Video Cassette—Castle Video CV2845 (PAL); Polygram-Vidéo 070 031-3 (SECAM) Polygram 079 261-3 (PAL)
- Lucrezia Borgia—Joan Sutherland (Lucrezia), Giacomo Aragall (Gennaro), Marilyn Horne (Orsini), Ingvar Wixell (Alfonso), London Opera Chorus, National Philharmonic Orchestra, Richard Bonynge (conductor), Decca, 1977.
- Maria Stuarda—Joan Sutherland (Maria), Huguette Tourangeau (Elisabeta), Luciano Pavarotti (Leicester), Roger Soyer (Talbot), Margreta Elkins (Anna), James Morris (Cecil), Coro del Teatro Comunale di Bologna, Orchestra del Teatro Comunale di Bologna, Richard Bonynge, recorded 1975—Decca 00289 425 4102 / Lyrica LRC 1040/1041—Track listing and excerpts

Charles Gounod

- Faust—Joan Sutherland (Marguerite), Franco Corelli (Faust), Nicolai Ghiaurov (Méphistophélès), Robert Massard (Valentin), Margreta Elkins (Siébel), Monica Sinclair (Marthe), Raymond Myers (Wagner), Ambrosian Opera Chorus and Highgate School Choir, London Symphony Orchestra, Richard Bonynge, Decca 0289 4705632 4 (2002 release) / 421 240-2 (1991 release) / 467 059-2 / London POCL 3962-4 Track listing and audio samples

George Frideric Handel

- Acis and Galatea—Joan Sutherland (Galatea), Peter Pears (Acis), Owen Brannigan (Polyphemus), David Galliver (Damon), The St. Anthony Singers, Philomusica of London, Sir Adrian Boult (conductor). L'Oiseau-Lyre OL 50179-80
- Alcina—Joan Sutherland (Alcina), Margreta Elkins (Ruggiero), Lauris Elms (Bradamante), Richard Greager (Oronte), Narelle Davidson (Morgana), Ann-Maree McDonald (Oberto), John Wegner (Melisso), Chorus and Orchestra of Australian Opera, Richard Bonynge, recorded 1983. Celestial Audio CA 112
- Alcina coupled with Giulio Cesare in Egitto (highlights)—Margreta Elkins (Giulio Cesare), Joan Sutherland (Cleopatra), Marilyn Horne (Cornelia), Monica Sinclair (Tolomeo), Richard Conrad (Sesto), New Symphonic Orchestra of London, Richard Bonynge—Decca 00289 433 7232 / 467063-2 / 467 067-2—Track listing and excerpts
- Athalia—Joan Sutherland, Emma Kirkby, Aled Jones, James Bowman, Anthony Rolfe Johnson, David Thomas, The Academy of Ancient Music, Christopher Hogwood (conductor)
- Messiah—Joan Sutherland, Grace Bumbry, Kenneth McKellar, David Ward, London Symphony Orchestra, Sir Adrian Boult (conductor)—Decca 433 003-2
- Messiah-Joan Sutherland, Huguette Tourangeau (mezzo), Werner Krenn (tenor), Tom Krause (bass), The Ambrosian Singers, English Chamber Orchestra, Richard Bonynge (Conductor) - Decca set 465-7. 433740-2
- Rodelinda—Alfred Hallett (Grimoaldo), Raimund Herincx (Garibaldo), Joan Sutherland (Rodelinda), Dame Janet Baker (Eduige), Margreta Elkins (Bertarido), Patricia Kern (Unolfo), Chandos Singers, Philomusica Antiqua Orchestra, Charles Farncombe. An English language version, recorded live on 24 June 1959—Opera D'oro OPD 1189 (two CDs) or Memories HR 4577-4578 or Living Stage LS 403 35147 (highlights).
- Rodelinda—Joan Sutherland (Rodelinda), Huguette Tourangeau (Bertarido), Éric Tappy (Grimoaldo), Margreta Elkins (Eduige), Cora Canne Meijer (Unolfo), Pieter Van Den Berg (Garibaldo), Netherlands Chamber Orchestra, Richard Bonynge. Recorded 30 June 1973—Bella Voce BLV 10 7206.

Jules Massenet

- Esclarmonde—Joan Sutherland (Esclarmonde), Huguette Tourangeau (Parséis), Clifford Grant (Phorcas), Giacomo Aragall (Roland), Louis Quilico (the bishop of Blois), Ryland Davies (Enéas), Robert Lloyd (Cléomer), Finchley Children's Music Group, John Alldis Choir, National Philharmonic Orchestra, Richard Bonynge, Decca 3 CDs 475 7914 DM3 (2006 release)

Giacomo Meyerbeer

- Les Huguenots—Joan Sutherland (Marguerite), Franco Corelli (Raoul), Giulietta Simionato (Valentine), Nicolai Ghiaurov (Marcel), Fiorenza Cossotto (Urbain), Gianandrea Gavazzeni, Orchestra e Coro del Teatro Alla Scala. Live: 7 June 1962. Opera D'Oro. Sung in Italian.
- Les Huguenots—Dominic Cossa (Nevers), Gabriel Bacquier (Saint-Bris), Nicola Ghiuselev (Marcel), John Wakefield (Tavannes), Joseph Ward (Cossé), John Noble (Thoré), Glynne Thomas (Retz), John Gibbs (Meru), Clifford Grant (Maurevert), Janet Coster (Léonard), Dame Kiri Te Kanawa (1st Maid of Honour), Josephte Clement (2nd Maid of Honour), Arleen Auger (1st Gypsy Girl), Maureen Lehane (2nd Gypsy Girl), Joan Sutherland (Marguerite de Valois), Martina Arroyo (Valentine), Huguette Tourangeau (Urbain), Anastasios Vrenios (Raoul de Nangis), Alan Opie (2nd Monk), NPO, Bonynge. Decca 430 549-2, recorded in 1969.

Wolfgang Amadeus Mozart

- Idomeneo—Sergei Baigildin (Idomeneo), Margreta Elkins (Idamante), Henri Wilden (Arbace), Leona Mitchell (Ilia), Joan Sutherland (Elettra), Australian Opera Chorus, Sydney Elizabethan Orchestra, Richard Bonynge, recorded 1979. Gala GLH 826 (highlights) and Celestial Audio CA 060 (highlights)
- Don Giovanni—Gottlob Frick (Commendatore), Luigi Alva (Don Ottavio), Graziella Sciutti (Zerlina), Joan Sutherland (Donna Anna), Piero Cappuccilli (Masetto), Elisabeth Schwarzkopf (Donna Elvira), Eberhard Wächter (Don Giovanni), Heinrich Schmidt, Giuseppe Taddei (Leporello), London Philharmonia Orchestra, Carlo Maria Giulini. Recorded 1959—EMI 0724356787353
- Don Giovanni—Gabriel Bacquier (Don Giovanni), Pilar Lorengar (Donna Elvira), Marilyn Horne (Zerlina), Joan Sutherland (Donna Anna), English Chamber Orchestra, Richard Bonynge. Decca 448 973-2

Jacques Offenbach

- Les contes d'Hoffmann—Joan Sutherland (Stella\Olympia\Antonia\Giulietta), Plácido Domingo (Hoffmann), Gabriel Bacquier (Lindorf\Coppelius\Miracle\Dappertutto), L'Orchestre de la Suisse Romande, Orchestre du Radio de la Suisse Romande, Pro Arte de Lausanne, Andre Charlet, Richard Bonynge, studio recording made at Victoria Hall, Geneva, first published in 1976.

Giacomo Puccini

- Suor Angelica—Joan Sutherland (Angelica), Christa Ludwig (La Zia Principessa), National Philharmonic Orchestra, Richard Bonynge. Decca 475 6531 (coupled with Leoni's "L'oracolo")
- Turandot—Joan Sutherland (Turandot), Luciano Pavarotti (Calaf), Montserrat Caballé (Liu), Nicolai Ghiaurov (Timur), Peter Pears (Emperor), London Philharmonic Orchestra, Zubin Mehta. Decca 414 274-2, recorded in 1972.

Gioachino Rossini

- Semiramide—Joan Sutherland (Semiramide), John Serge (Idreno), Joseph Rouleau (Assur), Spiro Malas (Oroe), Patricia Clark (Azema), Leslie Fyson(Mitrane), Michael Langdon (Spectre of Nino), Marilyn Horne (Arsace), London Symphony Orchestra, Richard Bonynge. Decca 425 481-2, recorded in 1966.

Ambroise Thomas

- Hamlet—Joan Sutherland, Gösta Winbergh, James Morris, Sherill Milnes, Orchestra and Chorus of the Welsh National Opera. Decca, 433 857-2, recorded in April 1983.

Giuseppe Verdi

- Ernani—Luciano Pavarotti (Ernani), Joan Sutherland (Elvira), Leo Nucci (Carlo), Paata Burchuladze (Silva), Linda McLeod (Giovanna), Richard Morton (Riccardo), Alastair Miles (Jago), Orchestra and Chorus of Welsh National Opera, Richard Bonynge. Recorded: Walthamstow Assembly Hall, 10–21 May 1987. Original CD release: 421 412-2 DHO2 (two CDs), CD re-release: 475 7008 DM2 (two CDs)
- I masnadieri—Joan Sutherland, Samuel Ramey, Franco Bonisolli, Matteo Manuguerra, Simone Alaimo, Orchestra and Chorus of the Welsh Nation, Richard Bonynge. CD re-release in 1993: 433 854-2 (two CD, DDD).
- Requiem—Joan Sutherland, Marilyn Horne, Luciano Pavarotti, Martti Talvela, Vienna State Opera Chorus and Vienna Philharmonic, sir Sir Georg Solti (1967), Decca 411 944-2
- Requiem—Joan Sutherland, Fiorenza Cossotto, Luigi Ottolini, Ivo Vinco, Philharmonia Orchestra and Chorus, Carlo Maria Giulini (1960 live recording), Myto 00309
- Rigoletto—Cornell MacNeil, Joan Sutherland, Renato Cioni, Cesare Siepi, Chorus & Orchestra of the Accademia di Santa Cecilia, Nino Sanzogno, Decca, 1961.
- Rigoletto—Sherrill Milnes, Joan Sutherland, Luciano Pavarotti, Martti Talvela, Ambrosian Opera Chorus, London Symphony Orchestra, Richard Bonynge, Decca, 1971.
- La traviata—Joan Sutherland, Carlo Bergonzi, Robert Merrill, Chorus & Orchestra of Maggio Musicale Fiorentino, John Pritchard, Decca, 1962
- La traviata—Joan Sutherland, Luciano Pavarotti, Matteo Manuguerra, National Philharmonic Orchestra, Richard Bonynge. London 430 491-2 recorded in 1979.
- Il trovatore—Luciano Pavarotti (Manrico), Ingvar Wixell (Il Conte di Luna), Nicolai Ghiaurov (Ferrando), Joan Sutherland (Leonora), Marilyn Horne (Azucena), Graham Clark (Ruiz), Norma Burrowes (Ines), Peter Knapp (Un vecchio zingaro), Wynford Evans (Un messo), London Opera Chorus, National Philharmonic Orchestra, Richard Bonynge. Recorded: Kingsway Hall, London, 8, 10, 11, 13–18, 20 September 1976; 26 March 1977. Original LP release: D82D 3 (three LPs), CD release: 417 137-2 DH2* (two CDs), CD re-release: 460 735-2 DF2 (two CDs). (Ballet music not included in CD release).

Richard Wagner

- Siegfried—Joan Sutherland as the Woodbird, Vienna Philharmonic (Sir Georg Solti) 1962 recording, London 414 110-2

Video recordings

- The Metropolitan Opera Centennial Gala, Deutsche Grammophon DVD, 00440-073-4358, 2009
