= Alasdair Kent =

Australian operatic tenor

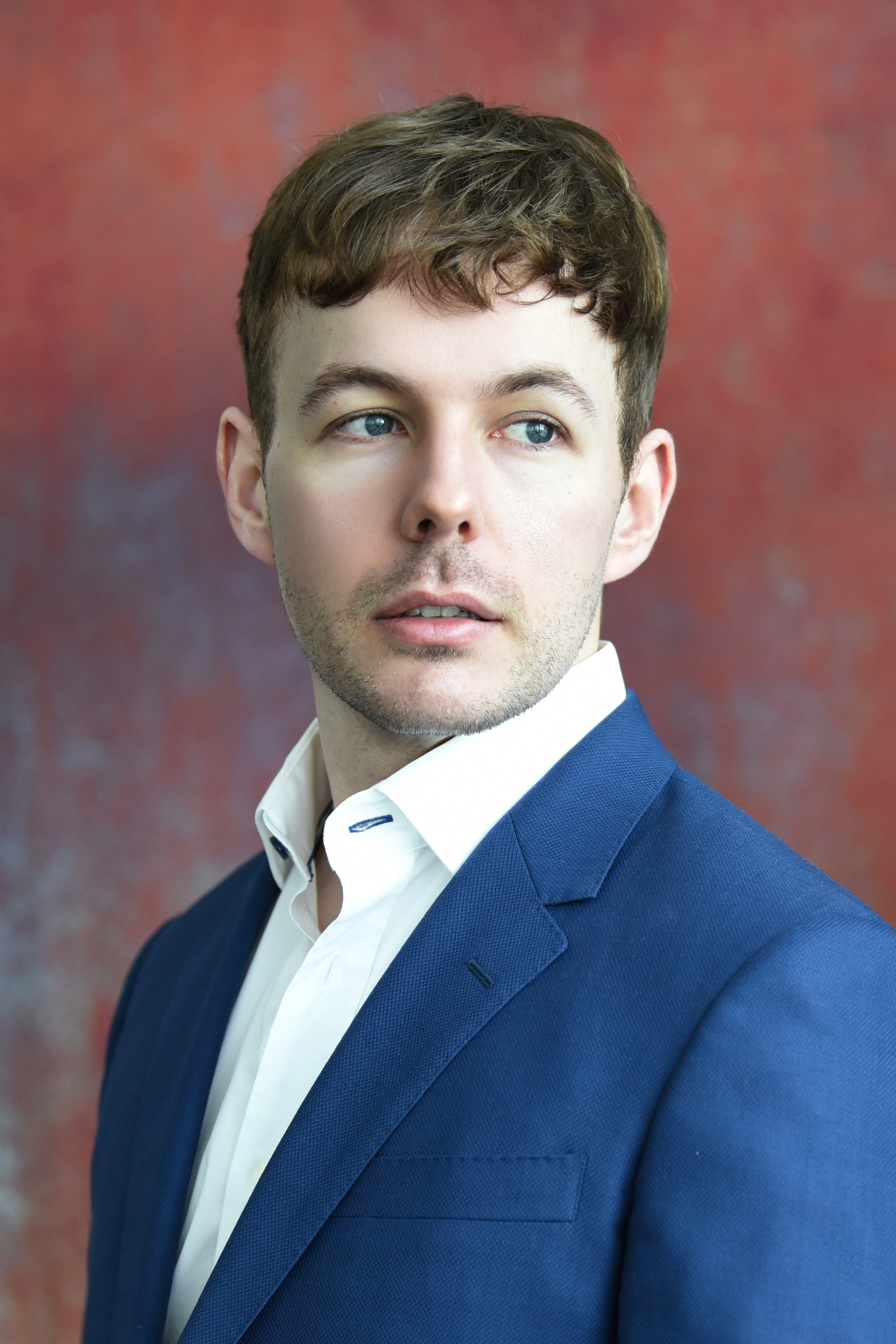
- Alasdair Kent, 2018
- Born: Perth, Western Australia
- Occupation: Operatic tenor
- Years active: 2013–present
- Website: alasdairkent.com

Alasdair Kent is an Australian operatic tenor, principally known for his interpretations of the Italian bel canto of Rossini, and Mozart. In 2016, Richard Bonynge presented him with the Joan Sutherland & Richard Bonynge Foundation Bel Canto Award. After studies in the US and his European debut with the Rossini Opera Festival in 2017, his international career has seen debuts in major roles in many of the world's leading opera houses and concert venues, including the Opéra national de Paris, Staatsoper Unter den Linden, Wiener Staatsoper, Teatro alla Scala, Teatro Real Madrid, Bayerische Staatsoper, Gran Teatre del Liceu, Opernhaus Zürich and the Festival d'Aix-en-Provence.

== Early life and education ==
Alasdair Kent was born in Perth, Western Australia. He studied music and performance at the Western Australian Academy of Performing Arts and the University of Western Australia with mezzo-soprano Megan Sutton, as well as English literature, and Italian, French and German languages. He sang with the West Australian Opera Chorus for several seasons in various repertoire, and also took part in the Lisa Gasteen National Opera Program. In 2017, he received an Artist Diploma from the Academy of Vocal Arts in Philadelphia, where he studied with Bill Schuman and sang performances of Lindoro (L'italiana in Algeri), Ferrando (Così fan tutte), Don Ottavio (Don Giovanni) and Rinuccio (Gianni Schicchi). He was an Emerging Artist with Opera Philadelphia, and a Filene Young Artist with Wolf Trap Opera, where he performed as Ritornello in Florian Leopold Gassmann's L'opera seria, and Giocondo in Rossini's La pietra del paragone. He also took part in the Martina Arroyo Foundation's Prelude to Performance and the Merola Opera Program.

== Career ==
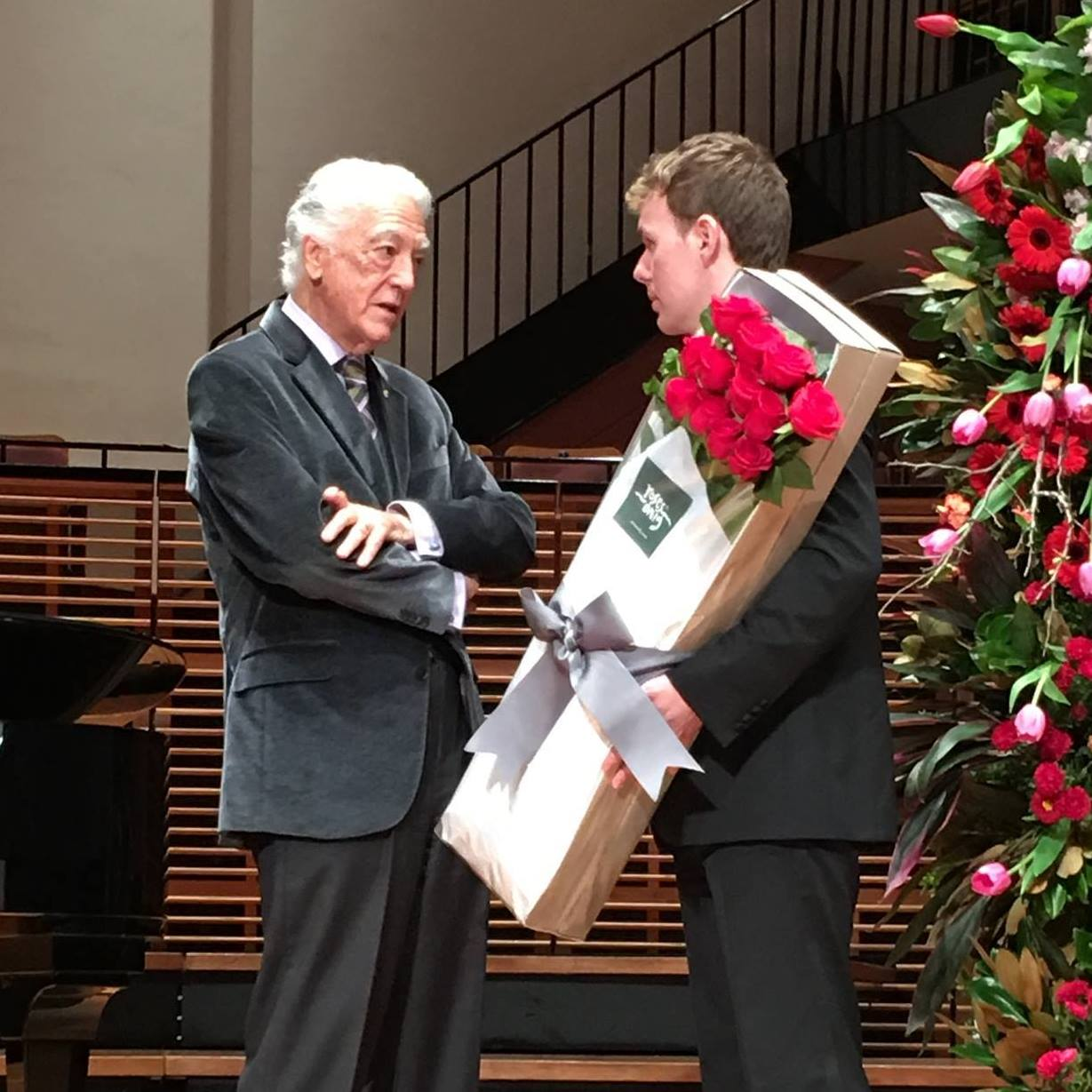
Richard Bonynge (l.) and Kent at the Joan Sutherland & Richard Bonynge Foundation Bel Canto Award in 2016

=== Early career ===
Kent made his professional debut in Australia at the age of 25, as Don Ramiro in La Cenerentola with Opera Queensland in 2013. While at AVA, he made his US concert debut with The Dallas Opera in 2015, and his US operatic debut in 2016 with Opera Philadelphia in Cold Mountain, an operatic adaptation of Charles Frazier's novel composed by Grammy Award and Pulitzer Prize winner Jennifer Higdon. His European debut followed in 2017, as Cavaliere Belfiore in Il viaggio a Reims for the Rossini Opera Festival in Pesaro. In the subsequent season, 2017–18, Kent sang multiple productions of L'italiana in Algeri, with Opéra national de Montpellier, Opéra de Toulon and also a new production for the Hungarian State Opera, created by Máté Szabó and conducted by Francesco Lanzillotta. He performed small roles in a new production of George Benjamin’s Written on Skin with Opera Philadelphia, and also in Rossini's Mosè in Egitto at the Teatro San Carlo di Napoli conducted by Stefano Montanari. He also sang La Cenerentola with Portland Opera.

The following season, 2018-19, the tenor debuted in Rossini's Tancredi with the Teatro Petruzzelli di Bari in a production by Pier Luigi Pizzi. This was performed with the tragic ending as composed for Ferrara, not the much more common lieto fine written for the opera's 1813 premiere at La Fenice. Due to the indisposition of a colleague, Kent sang this role on two consecutive evenings, with his performance described as, "exquisite... The mastery of diction and the excellent color of the high tessitura.. were the highlights of his performance, which was also convincing on an actor's level." He debuted professionally Rossini's Messa di Gloria, a work he sang while studying at AVA, with the Orchestre de Pau Pays de Béarn. Kent repeated his performances of L'italiana in Algeri in Budapest, and sang multiple productions of Così fan tutte: for the Lyric Opera of Kansas City, conducted by Dame Jane Glover and with mezzo-soprano Daniela Mack as Dorabella; for the Israeli Opera in Atom Egoyan’s production; and for the Rete Lirica delle Marche in a production by Pier Luigi Pizzi in the Teatro dell'Aquila, Teatro Ventidio Basso, Teatro della Fortuna, and the Teatro Marrucino. His season closed with a new production of Cimarosa’s Il matrimonio segreto designed and directed by Pier Luigi Pizzi for the Festival della Valle d'Itria.

Season 2019-20 saw Kent perform in Il barbiere di Siviglia for Theater Basel with David Parry conducting Kirill Serebrennikov’s production from the Komische Oper Berlin. Kent's performance "impresse[d] with a powerful, absolutely confident, technically excellent tenore di grazia." He repeated his performances as Paolino in Pizzi's production of Il matrimonio segreto, this time for the Teatro Regio di Torino. He debuted as Tamino in Die Zauberflöte in a new production by Davide Livermore with the Royal Opera House Muscat, with Diego Fasolis conducting I Barocchisti. Several of his performances were cancelled due to the COVID-19 pandemic, notably Falstaff with the Opéra national de Montpellier, Così fan tutte with the Opéra national de Bordeaux, and Don Giovanni on tour with Les Musiciens du Louvre. In 2020-21, despite the ongoing pandemic, Kent made a major debut as Arturo in Bellini’s I puritani in his Spanish debut with Ópera de Oviedo. The tenor's extended high range was exhibited in this performance of Arturo's high-F in Act Three, the highest note written for the operatic tenor voice. He also performed Stravinsky’s Pulcinella with the Orchestra Sinfonica Nazionale della RAI conducted by Ottavio Dantone, and L'italiana in Algeri in a new production by Ido Ricklin for the Israeli Opera. His debut with Opernhaus Zürich in Il barbiere di Siviglia was cancelled due to the pandemic.

=== Major debuts ===
Kent began debuting in major theatres in leading roles in 2021-22, with performances of Il barbiere di Siviglia with both the Bayerische Staatsoper and The Dallas Opera. He also sang performances of Barbiere with Den Norske Opera & Ballett and with Oper Köln, in Ruth Berghaus' 1968 production from the Berliner Staatsoper. In these latter performances, he was praised for his "light, flexible tenor with seemingly as many high notes as you could want and breakneck coloratura." He debuted at Het Concertgebouw in Amsterdam in L'italiana in Algeri with the Orchestra of the Eighteenth Century, with a cast including Vasilisa Berzhanskaya. This performance was recorded live for CD release on Glossa Music, and was awarded a place on the Bestenliste of the Preis der deutschen Schallplattenkritik in 2023. He sang performances of Die Zauberflöte with the Israeli Opera in Barrie Kosky’s internationally acclaimed production, and Don Giovanni with Opéra de Toulon, where he was praised for his "impeccable musicality," his "almost celestial" voice, and for "making the whole audience hold their breath on "Dalla sua pace.." [reproducing] the enchantment in an "Il mio tesoro," of ideal breath and saturated with musicality. An exemplary performance..” He gave further performances in Donizetti’s Deux hommes et une femme at the Konzerthaus Berlin with the Berliner Operngruppe, and La Cenerentola with Wallis Giunta in the title role at the Opéra national de Montpellier, where Kent was described as "enchanting..play[ing] like a virtuoso with natural vocal charm.." and praised for his "clear and full voice.. the virtuosity of his singing. The length of breath, the articulation, the charm and the panache.."

In 2022-23, he returned to the Bayerische Staatsoper to make a role debut as Belmonte in Die Entführung aus dem Serail, and for performances of La Cenerentola in a cast including Florian Sempey and Erwin Schrott, in Jean-Pierre Ponnelle's historic production which premiered at Teatro alla Scala in 1973. He debuted at the Wiener Staatsoper in Herbert Fritsch's production of Il barbiere di Siviglia conducted by Michele Mariotti, and made an important role debut as Ernesto in Don Pasquale with the Teatro Petruzzelli di Bari. He appeared in a semi-staged concert tour of Così fan tutte with Julia Lezhneva, Emőke Baráth and Sandrine Piau, at the Théâtre des Champs-Élysées, Philharmonie Luxembourg, the Elbphilharmonie and Stadtcasino Basel, with Giovanni Antonini conducting the Kammerorchester Basel. Kent was praised for his "ravishing timbre," and his "particularly sensitive and refined interpretation of the aria "Un'aura amorosa.." Further performances included Il barbiere di Siviglia with Cincinnati Opera, Carmina Burana with Opera Philadelphia, Così fan tutte with the Royal Opera House Muscat, and Bach’s Weihnachtsoratorium with the Stavanger Symfoniorkester.

Major debuts continued in 2023–24 with performances as the title role in Haydn’s Orlando paladino at the Teatro Real Madrid and the Gran Teatre del Liceu, with Giovanni Antonini conducting Il Giardino Armonico and a cast that included Emőke Baráth. He debuted as Narciso in Il turco in Italia for Opernhaus Zürich, where he also appeared as Thespis in a new production of Rameau’s Platée with Emmanuelle Haïm conducting La Scintilla. He also debuted with Festival d’Aix-en-Provence in Dmitri Tcherniakov's double production of Gluck's Iphigénie en Aulide and Iphigénie en Tauride, both with Emmanuelle Haïm leading Le Concert d'Astrée, appearing as Achille in the former opera. The double-bill won the International Opera Award in the category of New Production. He made his house debut with Theater an der Wien in the world premiere of Salieri's Cublai, gran kan de’ Tartari in the original Italian-text, with Christophe Rousset conducting Les Talens Lyriques. This won the International Opera Award in the category of Rediscovered Work. Other performances included a house debut with the Deutsche Oper am Rhein in La Cenerentola, where he was critically praised for "his effortlessly radiant tones," and his "ease above the staff," and "beautiful messa di voce.." In concert, he appeared with the Orchestre national de Lille and with the Stavanger Symfoniorkester in George Benjamin's Written on Skin.

Kent's 2024–25 season included his house debut in concert at the Teatro alla Scala in Milan as Marzio in Mozart’s Mitridate, re di Ponto, with Christophe Rousset conducting Les Talens Lyriques, with a further performance at the Théâtre des Champs-Élysées. His performance at La Scala was critically praised for his, "exquisite line of singing, noble legato, pure timbre, excellent projection and uninhibited vocalisation." As Narciso in Il turco in Italia in Laurent Pelly’s production for Opéra de Lyon, conducted by Giacomo Sagripanti, he was praised for his, "great agility, beautiful legato, and extreme high range." In performances of Il barbiere di Siviglia with the Opéra de Montréal, one critic called him, "the major vocal discovery of the evening in Almaviva. This is a real tenore di grazia, with a distinguished tone and great finesse in the execution," and called the performances "a production which is worth seeing, especially for the remarkable Count Almaviva by Alasdair Kent." He also made debuts as Norfolk in Rossini’s Elisabetta, regina d'Inghilterra with the Teatro Massimo di Palermo, Pylade in Gluck’s Iphigénie en Tauride with the Teatro de la Maestranza in Seville, Frederic in The Pirates of Penzance with West Australian Opera in his hometown, Idreno in Rossini’s Semiramide with Opéra de Rouen and the Théâtre des Champs-Élysées, Christgeist in Mozart's Die Schuldigkeit des ersten Gebots at the Festival de Saint-Denis, Valère, Don Carlos, Tacmas & Damon in Rameau's Les Indes galantes for The Grange Festival with Leonardo García Alarcón and the Cappella Mediterranea, and as Toante in Tommaso Traetta's Ifigenia in Tauride with Christophe Rousset and Les Talens Lyriques with the Innsbrucker Festwochen der Alten Musik. He was named one of 2024's "Top Ten Rising Stars" by Operawire.

Alasdair Kent’s 2025–26 season includes his house debut at Opéra national de Paris as Hyllo in Antonia Bembo’s Ercole amante, in a new production by Netia Jones, and his house debut at Staatsoper Unter den Linden as Almaviva in Ruth Berghaus’ Il Barbiere di Siviglia. He returns to Teatro Regio di Torino as Belmonte in Die Entführung aus dem Serail, and to Opera Philadelphia as Libenskof in Il viaggio a Reims.

== Voice ==
Kent's voice is often described as a tenore di grazia or Rossini tenor, though he has labelled it simply as a "high tenor." He is frequently associated with bel canto: his most performed roles are those of Rossini and Mozart, though he also sings Donizetti, Bellini and Verdi. He started adding French haute-contre roles to his repertoire in 2023, such as those of Rameau and Gluck.

== Repertoire ==
- Adès: The Exterminating Angel – Raúl Yebenes
- Bellini: I puritani – Lord Arturo Talbot
- Bembo: Ercole amante – Hyllo
- Bertin: Fausto – Valentino
- Bizet: Don Procopio – Don Odoardo
- Cimarosa: Il matrimonio segreto – Paolino
- Donizetti
  - Deux hommes et une femme – Pepé
  - Maria Stuarda – Roberto, Earl of Leicester
  - Don Pasquale – Ernesto
- Gassmann: L'opera seria – Ritornello
- Gilbert and Sullivan: The Pirates of Penzance - Frederic
- Gluck
  - Iphigénie en Aulide – Achille
  - Iphigénie en Tauride – Pylade
- Gounod: Roméo et Juliette - Roméo
- Handel: The Triumph of Time and Truth – Pleasure
- Haydn: Orlando paladino – Orlando
- Mozart
  - Ascanio in Alba – Aceste
  - Die Schuldigkeit des ersten Gebots – Christgeist
  - Die Zauberflöte – Tamino
  - Così fan tutte – Ferrando
  - Die Entführung aus dem Serail – Belmonte
  - Don Giovanni – Don Ottavio
  - Mitridate, re di Ponto – Marzio
- Puccini: Gianni Schicchi – Rinuccio
- Rameau
  - Les Indes galantes – Valère, Don Carlos, Tacmas & Damon
  - Platée – Thespis
- Rossini
  - Il barbiere di Siviglia – Il Conte di Almaviva
  - La Cenerentola – Don Ramiro
  - Elisabetta, regina d'Inghilterra – Norfolk
  - Ermione – Oreste
  - L'italiana in Algeri – Lindoro
  - La pietra del paragone – Il Cavaliere Giocondo
  - La scala di seta – Dorvil
  - Semiramide – Idreno
  - Tancredi – Argirio
  - Il turco in Italia – Narciso
  - Il viaggio a Reims – Il Conte di Libenskof; Il Cavaliere Belfiore
- Salieri: Cublai, gran kan de' Tartari – Timur
- Traetta: Ifigenia in Tauride – Toante
- Verdi: Falstaff – Fenton

== Personal life ==
Kent was in a relationship with Benedikt Schobel, principal bassoonist of Sinfonieorchester Basel, which ended in 2024. The two performed in concert together. The tenor enjoys weightlifting and is a champagne enthusiast. He has frequently cited fellow Australian Dame Joan Sutherland as a vocal inspiration. He speaks multiple European languages.

== Awards and accolades ==
- 2024 Operawire's Top Ten Rising Stars
- 2017 Gerda Lissner Foundation International Vocal Competition First Prize
- 2017 Loren L. Zachary Society National Vocal Competition First Prize
- 2017 The Marten Bequest, prize for Singing
- 2017 Metropolitan Opera National Council Auditions National Semifinalist
- 2016 Joan Sutherland & Richard Bonynge Foundation Bel Canto Award, Georg Solti Accademia Prize
- 2016 Licia Albanese-Puccini Foundation International Vocal Competition Second Prize
- 2016 Academy of Vocal Arts Giargiari Bel Canto Competition First Prize & Audience Prize
- 2016 Mildred Miller International Voice Competition First Prize
- 2015 Violetta DuPont Vocal Competition First Prize

== Discography ==
- Tommaso Traetta's Ifigenia in Tauride—Rocío Pérez (Ifigenia), Rafał Tomkiewicz (Oreste), Suzanne Jerosme (Pilade), Alasdair Kent (Toante), Karolina Bengtsson (Dori), Novocanto & Les Talens Lyriques, Christophe Rousset (conductor), Aparté, 2026.
- Gioachino Rossini's L'italiana in Algeri—Vasilisa Berzhanskaya (Isabella), Alasdair Kent (Lindoro), Pablo Ruiz (Taddeo), Ricardo Seguel (Mustafà), Lilian Farahani (Elvira), Esther Kuiper (Zulma), Jose Coca Loza (Haly), La Cetra Vokalensemble Basel & Orchestra of the Eighteenth Century, Giancarlo Andretta (conductor), Glossa Music, 2023.
- Benjamin Britten's Our Hunting Fathers, Quatre Chansons Françaises, Symphonic Suite from Gloriana—Mark Padmore, Christina Landshamer, Alasdair Kent (The Lute Song), Sinfonieorchester Basel, Ivor Bolton (conductor), Prospero Classical, 2022.
- Poul Ruders' The Thirteenth Child—Sarah Shafer (Princess Lyra), Tamara Mumford (Queen Gertrude), Ashraf Sewailam (Drokan), Matt Boehler (King Hjarne), Alasdair Kent (Prince Frederic), David Portillo (Benjamin), Alex Rosen (Corbin), Bridge Academy Singers & Odense Symfoniorkester, Benjamin Shwartz & David Starobin (conductors), Bridge Records, 2019.
- The Exquisite Hour—Alasdair Kent (tenor), David Wickham (pianist), 2021.
