= Francisco Negrin =

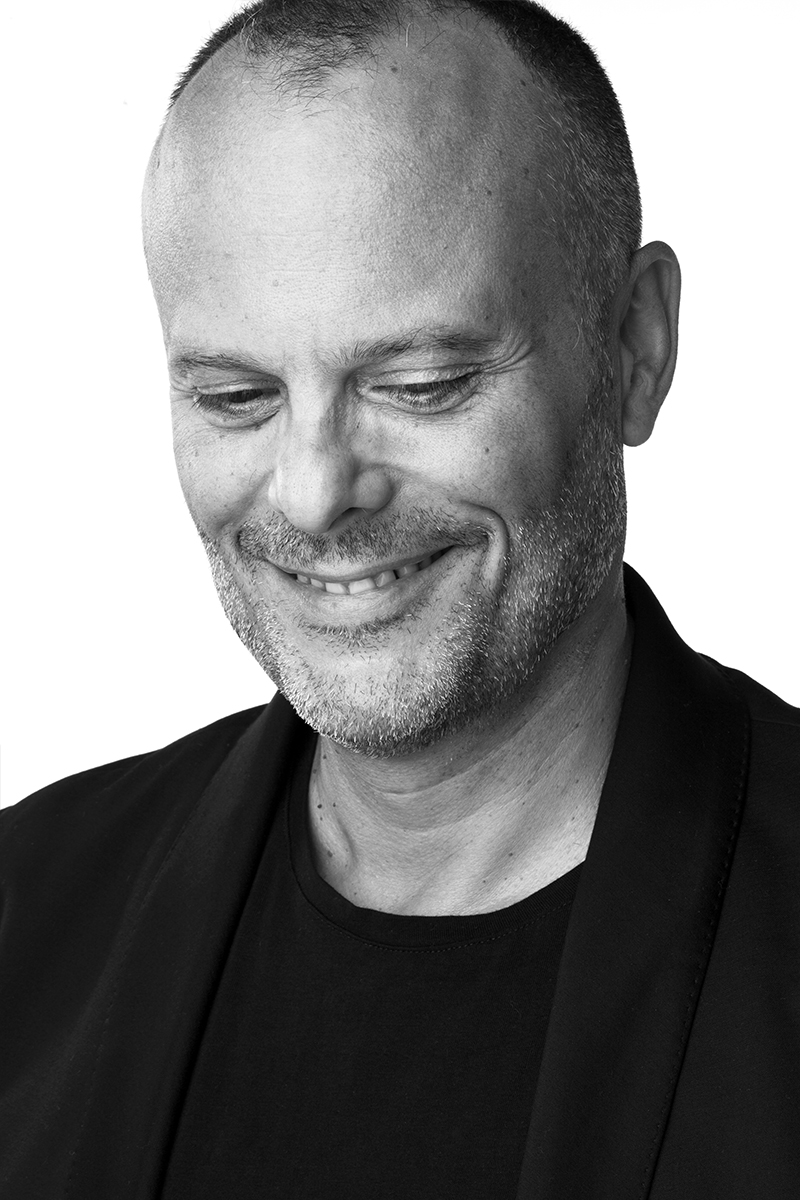
- Born: June 5, 1963 (age 63); Mexico City
- Occupation: Stage director
- Website: negrin.com/francisco

Francisco Negrin (Spanish: Francisco Negrín, born June 5, 1963) is a creative director working in opera, as well as in the world of stadium and arena based shows and other events. He is considered to be one of the best directors in the world. He is known for his musical and cinematic approach, and for his success with projects considered to be difficult to stage. In opera, he is seen as a specialist of both baroque and contemporary music and his work in all media is characterised by a highly integrated use of dance and technology as part of the dramaturgy and a keen understanding of the culture being treated.

== Biography ==
Negrin was born in Mexico City, the son of Spaniard Francisco Negrín Díaz and Greek-Hawaiian Catherine Negrín (née Maggioros). He is the great-grandson of Juan Negrín López, President of the Second Spanish Republic. When he was 9 years old, the family moved from Mexico to the family home in Antibes, France.

After completing his secondary studies at the Lycée in Antibes (graduating with a mathematics and physics Baccalaureate), Negrin studied literature and film at the university of Aix-en-Provence, France, while attending singing lessons at the Conservatoire d'Aix-en-Provence, where he was first in contact with the world of opera. He worked as an extra and later as an assistant director and stage manager at the Aix-en-Provence Festival (1982–83). There he met Swiss stage director François Rochaix, who became his mentor and teacher. Negrin assisted him on many productions, including Seattle Opera's Ring cycle. Rochaix introduced him to the artist agent Lies Askonas. She recommended Negrin to Gerard Mortier who hired him as a staff assistant director at La Monnaie/De Munt in Brussels for two seasons (1984-1986). There he continued to learn his trade assisting the directors Patrice Chéreau, Karl-Ernst Herrmann, John Cox and Maurice Béjart. After leaving La Monnaie in 1986, Negrin moved to London where he started his career as a director. He has lived in Spain since 2003.

== Career ==
Negrin and conductor Peter Ash put together a performing version of the unfinished La chute de la maison Usher by Debussy, which they staged at Christ Church, Spitalfields, in London. This performance came to the attention of the Southbank Centre which commissioned a production of the reconstruction for the Queen Elizabeth Hall in 1989. That was the start of an international directing career which, in opera, includes the following productions:

=== Opera productions ===
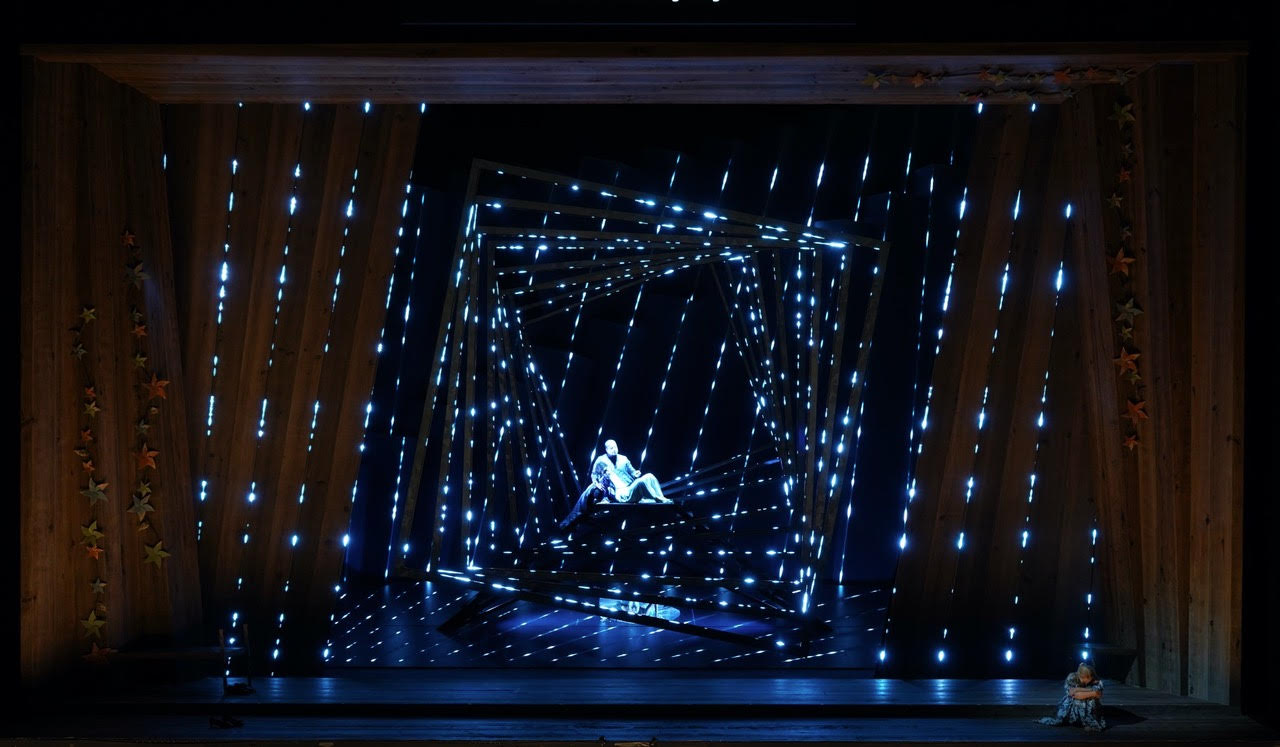
The Snow Queen. World premiere at the Royal Danish Opera, staged by Francisco Negrin, October 2019. Photo by Francisco Negrin

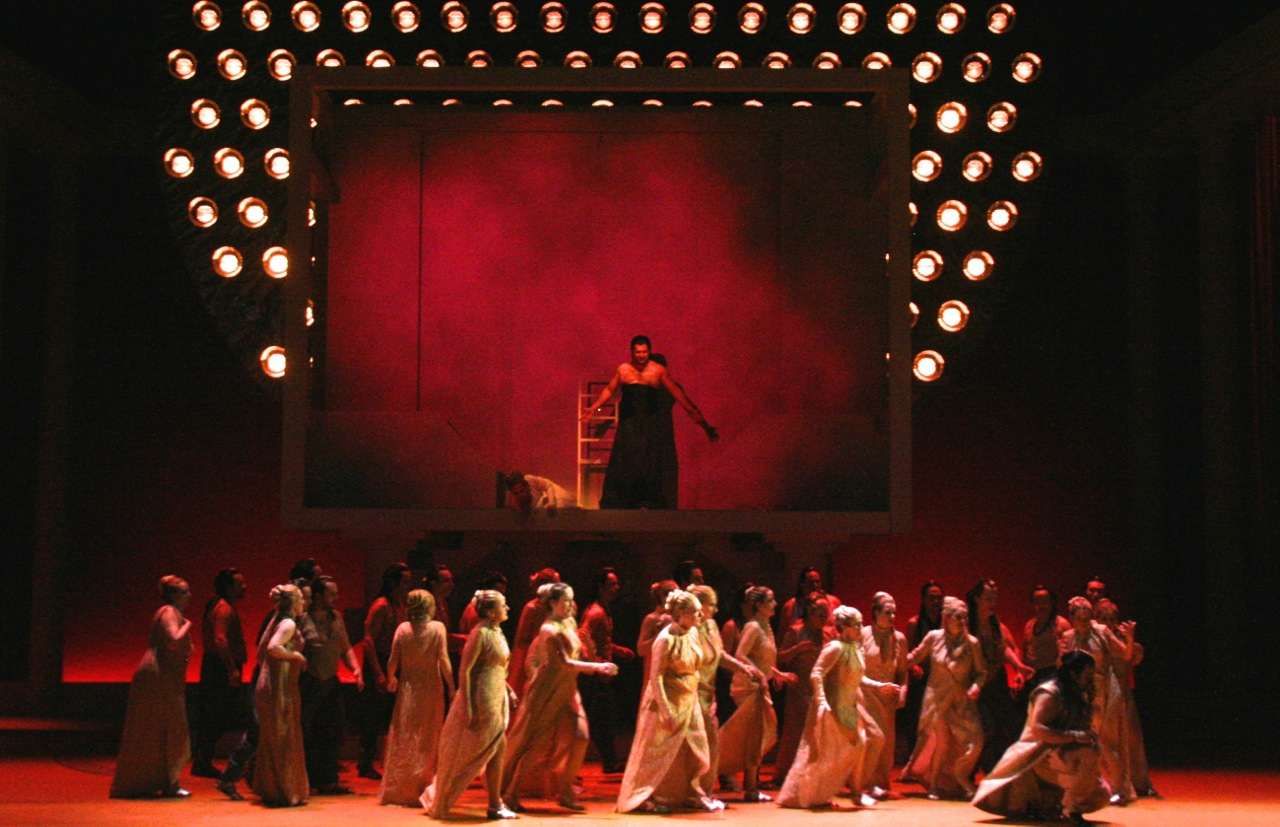
Thaïs. Theater Bonn, May 2014. Photo by Francisco Negrin

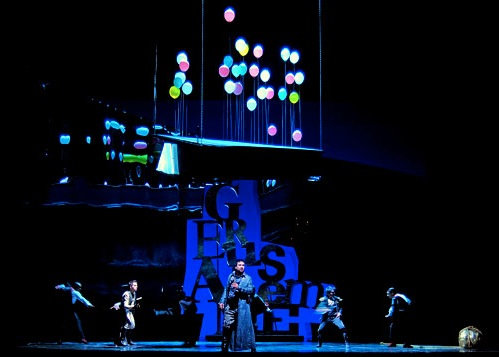
Rinaldo. Chicago Lyric Opera, 2012. Photo by Francisco Negrin

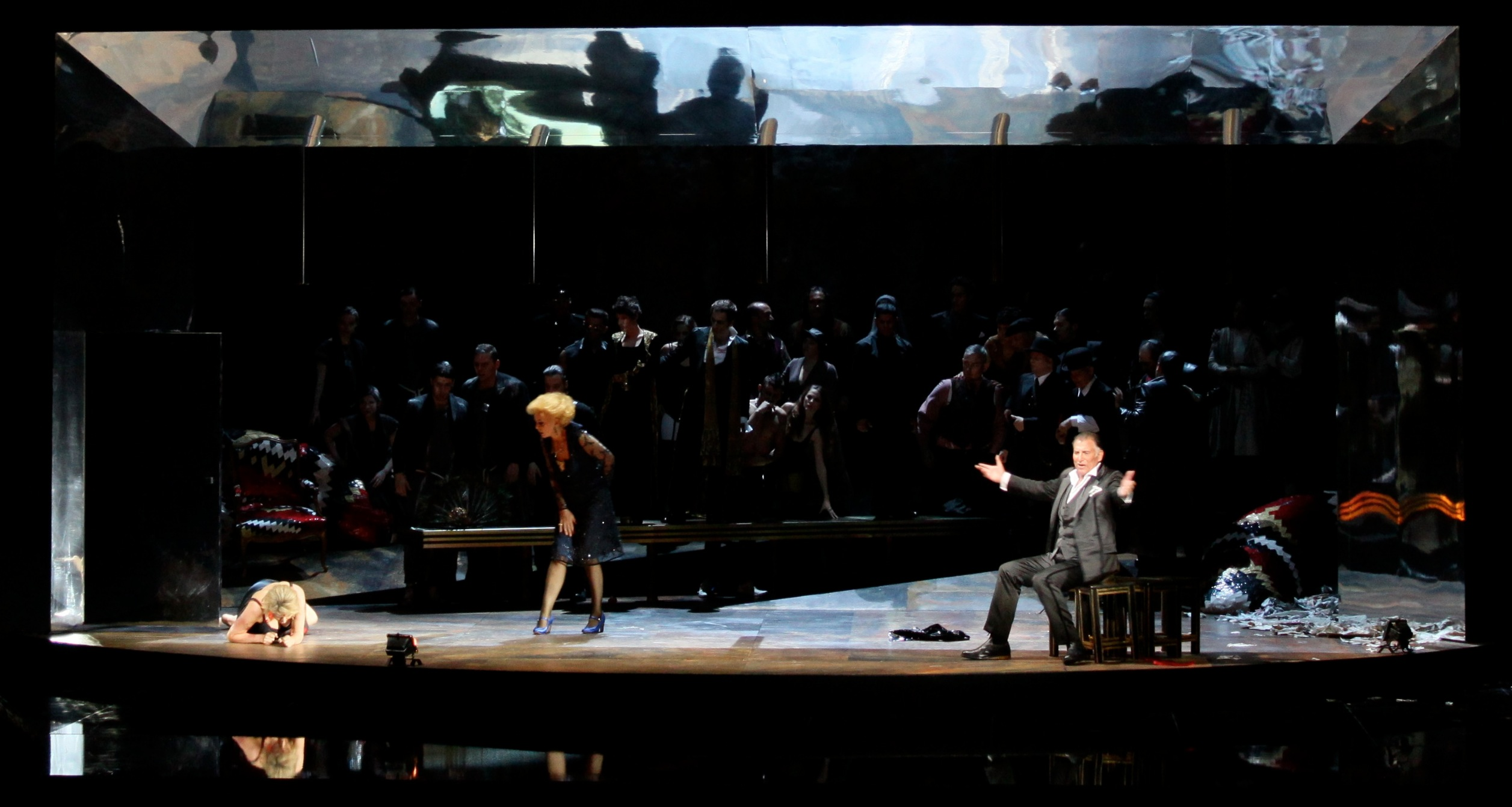
Salome. Palau de les Arts in Valencia, 2010. Photo by Bruno Poet

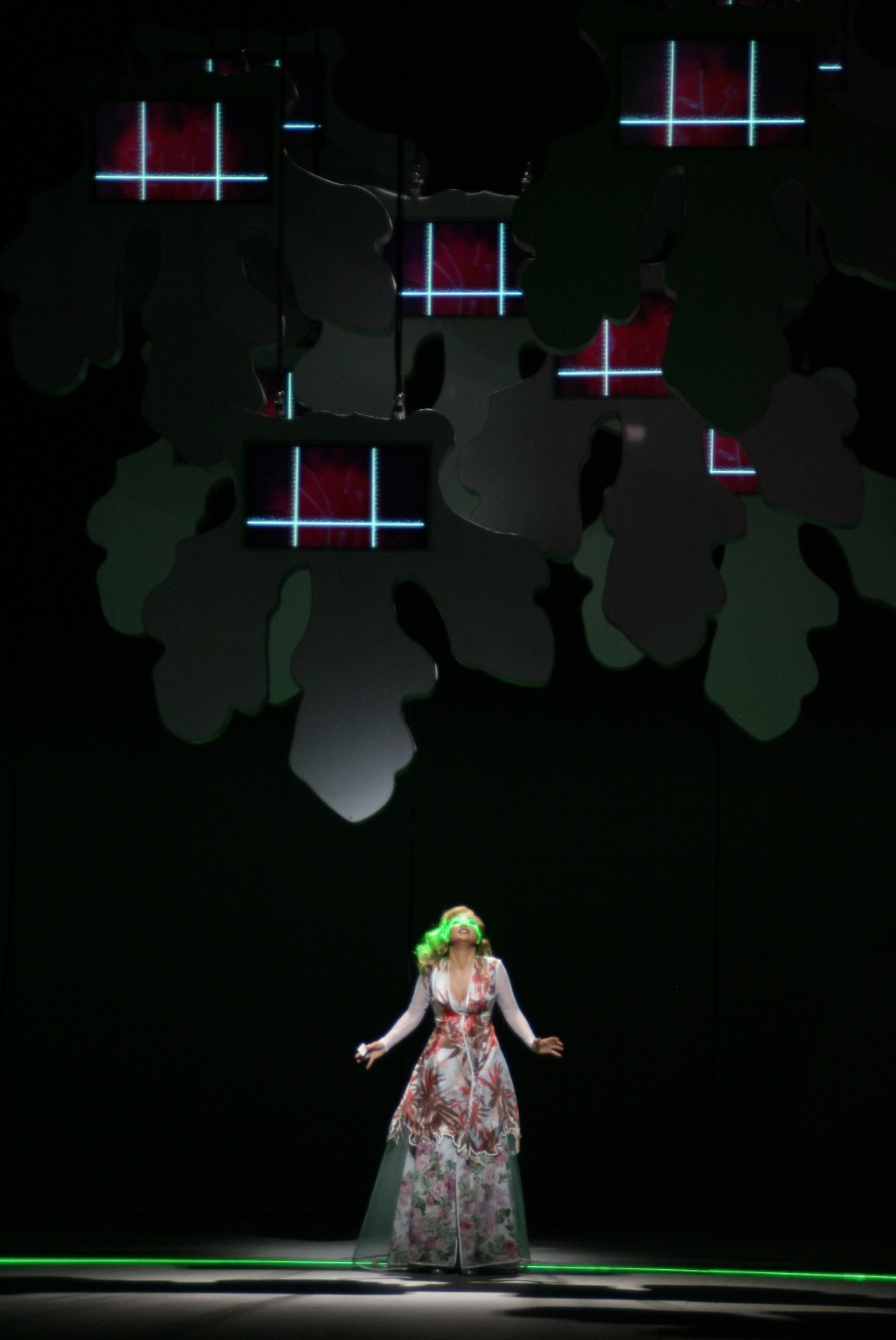
L'arbore di Diana. Gran Teatre del Liceu, Barcelona 2009. Photo by Ariane Unfried

Production (Composer)	Venue · location · dates
Lady Macbeth of Mtsensk (Shostakovich)	Leipzig Opera · Leipzig · May 2024
Salome (Strauss)	Houston Grand Opera · Los Angeles · April 2023; ABAO · Bilbao · February 2018; Palau de les Arts · Valencia · June 2010
Nabucco (Verdi)	Oper im Steinbruch · Sankt Margarethen · July 2022
Il Trovatore (II) (Verdi)	Los Angeles Opera · Los Angeles · September 2021; Teatro Real · Madrid · July 2019; Royal Danish Opera · Copenhagen · September 2018; Opera de Monte-Carlo · Mónaco · April 2017
The Snow Queen (Abrahamsen)	Royal Danish Opera · Copenhagen · October 2019
Jérusalem (Verdi)	ABAO · Bilbao · November 2019; Theatre Bonn · Bonn · January 2016
Il Trovatore (Verdi)	Sferisterio Opera Festival · Macerata · July 2013 and 2016
Idomeneo (Mozart)	Aalto Musiktheater · Essen · November 2014
Mitridate (II) (Mozart)	Drottningholm · Stockholm · August 2014
Thaïs (Massenet)	Theatre Bonn · Bonn · May 2014
Alcina (Handel)	Norwegian Opera · Oslo · January 2014; Royal Danish Opera · Copenhagen · February 2015
The Cunning Little Vixen (Janáček)	Royal Danish Opera · Copenhagen · December 2012
Rinaldo (II) (Handel)	Lyric Opera · Chicago · February 2012
L'Arbore di Diana (Martín y Soler)	Opera National · Montpellier · November 2011; Teatro Real · Madrid · March 2010; Liceu · Barcelona · October 2009
Macbeth (Verdi)	Opéra de Monte-Carlo · Monaco · April 2012; ABAO · Bilbao · February 2011; Opéra national du Rhin · Strasbourg and Mulhouse · April 2010
I Puritani (Bellini)	Grand Théâtre · Geneva · January 2011; Greek National Opera · Athens · April 2009; De Nederlandse Opera · Amsterdam · February 2009
Una cosa rara (II) (Martín y Soler)	Auditorio Narciso Yepes · Murcia · December 2010; Teatro Calderón · Valladolid · April 2010; Palau de les Arts · Valencia · February 2010
Werther (II) (Massenet)	San Francisco Opera · San Francisco · September 2010
Alceste (Gluck)	Santa Fe Opera · Santa Fe · August 2009
Partenope (II) (Handel)	Royal Danish Opera · Copenhagen · October 2008
La corte de Faraón (Lleó)	Palau de les Arts · Valencia · June 2008
Orlando (Handel)	Palau de les Arts · Valencia · February 2008; Royal Opera House · London · February 2007; Royal Opera House · London · October 2003
La Clemenza di Tito (Mozart)	Leipzig Opera · Leipzig · January 2008; Liceu · Barcelona · October 2006
Norma (Bellini)	Liceu · Barcelona · July 2007; Liceu · Barcelona · December 2002; Grand Théâtre · Geneva · September 1999; Teatre Victoria · Barcelona · February 1999
Die Lustige Witwe (Lehar)	Leipzig Opera · Leipzig · December 2006
Mitridate (Mozart)	The Alhambra · Granada · June 2006; Santa Fe Opera · Santa Fe · July 2001; Grand Théâtre · Geneva · November 1997
Orphée (II) (Glass)	Royal Opera House · London · May 2005
Temistocle (J.C. Bach)	Théâtre du Capitole · Toulouse · June 2005; Leipzig Opera · Leipzig · April 2005
Kafka's Trial (Ruders)	Royal Danish Opera · Copenhagen · March 2005
Giulio Cesare (II) (Handel)	Royal Danish Opera · Copenhagen · March 2005; Royal Danish Opera · Copenhagen · May 2002
Leonore (Beethoven)	Teatro Comunale · Bologna · November 2004
Arabella (Strauss)	Flemish Opera · Gent · October 2004; Opera North · Leeds · May 1999
Agrippina (Handel)	Santa Fe Opera · Santa Fe · August 2004
Don Giovanni (Mozart)	Glimmerglass · Cooperstown · July 2003
Partenope (I) (Handel)	Lyric Opera · Chicago · February 2003; NYC Opera · New York · September 1998; Glimmerglass · Cooperstown · July 1998
Fidelio (Beethoven)	Flemish Opera · Antwerp · October 2002
Giulio Cesare (I) (Handel)	Dorothy Chandler Pavilion · L.A. · February 2001; Opera Queensland · Brisbane · October 1998; Opera Australia · Sydney · July 2000 / 1997 / June 1994
Rinaldo (I) (Handel)	NYC Opera · New York · October 2000
Beatrix Cenci (Ginastera)	Grand Théâtre · Geneva · September 2000
Der Freischütz (Weber)	Lausanne Opera · Lausanne · May 2000; Théâtre des Champs-Élysées · Paris · December 1999
Orphée (I) (Glass)	Royal Danish Opera · Copenhagen · March 1998
Venus (Schoeck)	Grand Théâtre · Geneva · February 1997
Les contes d'Hoffman (Offenbach)	Opera Australia · Sydney · September 1996
King Arthur (Purcell)	Guildhall · London · November 1995
Una cosa rara (I) (Martín y Soler)	Drottningholm · Stockholm · July 1995 / 1993
V.S. (MacMillan)	Edinburgh International Festival · Edinburgh · August 1993; Tramway · Glasgow · May 1993
Tourist Variations (MacMillan)	Edinburgh International Festival · Edinburgh · July 1993
Double Bill L'heure espagnole/La colombe (Ravel/Gounod)	Guildhall · London · November 1992
Don Carlo (Verdi)	Victoria State Opera · Melbourne · August 1992
Cosí Fan Tutte (Mozart)	Seattle Opera · Seattle · May 1992
The Jewel Box (Mozart)	Opera North · Leeds · February 1991; Glyndebourne · Lewes · October 1991
La Traviata (Verdi)	Opera North · Leeds · September 1990
Orlando Paladino (Haydn)	Garsington Festival · Garsington · June 1990
Janáček's Diary (Janáček)	Purcell Room · London · April 1990
Werther (I) (Massenet)	Opéra de Nice · Nice · March 1990
Usher (Debussy)	São Carlos · Lisbon · September 1989; Queen Elizabeth Hall · London · June 1989; Spitalfields Festival · London · June 1986

=== Other work ===
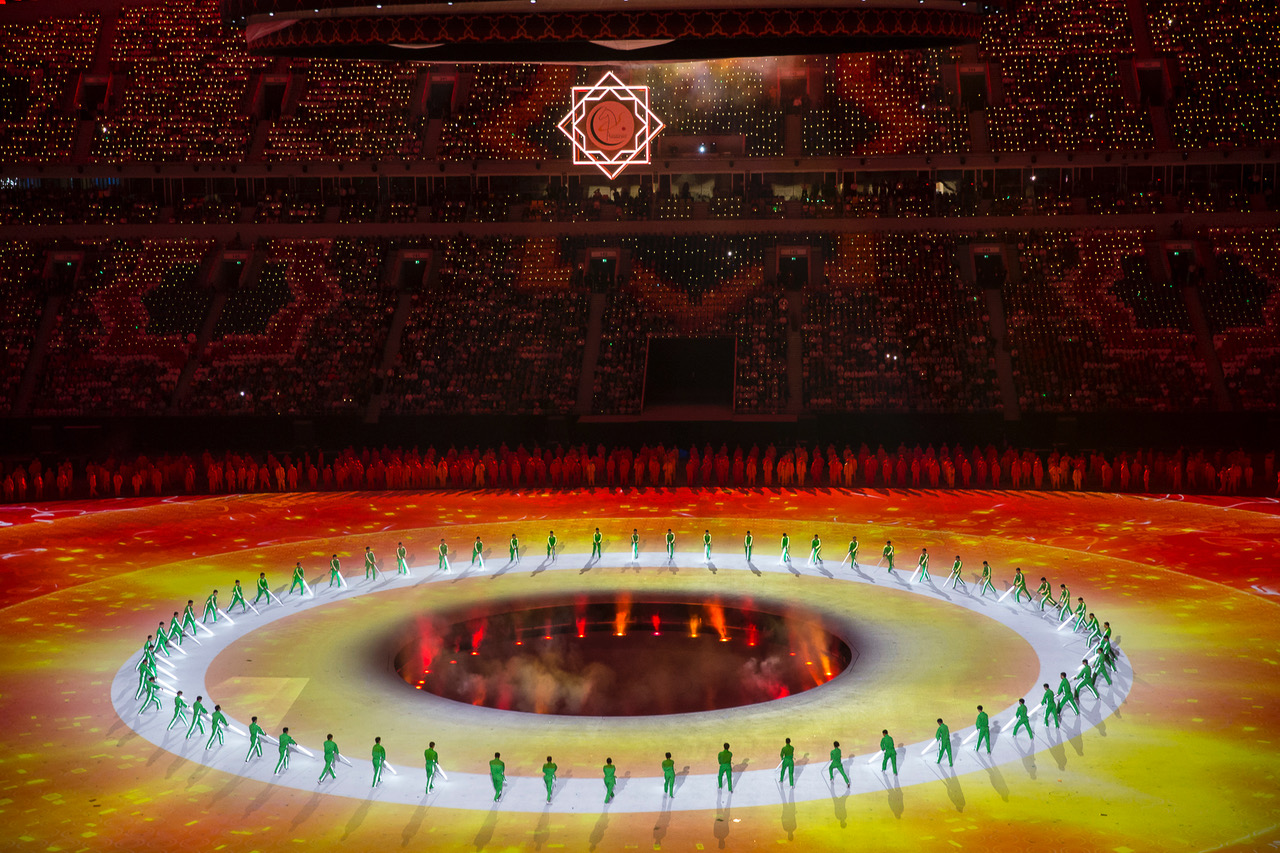
AIMAG 2017 Opening ceremony, Ashgabat, Turkmenistan. Photo by Francisco Negrin

In 2024, negrin was the creative director for three special concerts celebrating Andrea Bocelli’s 30 years of career, at the Teatro del Silenzio in Tuscany, featuring stars from music and screen including as Ed Sheeran, Jon Batiste, Will Smith, Brian May, Johnny Depp, Plácido Domingo, Josep Carreras, Shania Twain and more. A feature film of the shows, directed by Sam Wrench was released in worldwide cinemas, Andrea Bocelli 30: The Celebration

From 2020 to 2023 has co-directed together with Es Devlin and Gavin Robins 4 monumental shows for the 49th to 52nd Union day Celebrations in the UAE.

In 2021 Negrin wrote and directed a new production for Holiday on Ice: A New Day. The tour was stopped by COVID lockdowns and postponed to 2022. The show then completed a second tour in 2024, of France this time, under the title Aurore.

In 2020 Francisco Negrin directed the tableau vivant for Louis Vuitton’s Paris fashion week autumn/winter womenswear show.

Francisco Negrin has been a creative consultant for Balich Worldwide Shows, for whom he has conceived stadium, arena and other commercial events and shows.

In 2019 Negrin conceived, wrote and directed the opening ceremony of the Lima Panamerican Games and was the creative supervisor for the closing and also for the Parapan American Games ceremonies. These ceremonies had a huge impact in the country.

Negrin worked with the rock band OK Go, conceiving the staging for a performance at London's The Roundhouse, using an installation by architect Ron Arad called Curtain Call. But the show was cancelled before opening.

=== Television and DVD ===
The following productions have been broadcast on TV: Venus, Les contes d'Hoffman, Una cosa rara (Drottninholm version), Una cosa rara (Valencia version) and Intimissimi on ice 2014 and 2105 were both broadcast in Italy and Spain.

The following productions have been released on DVD: I puritani (DVD and Blu-ray), L'arbore di Diana, Giulio Cesare (Sydney version), Giulio Cesare (Copenhagen version), Partenope (Copenhagen version), Norma (Barcelona version) and Il Trovatore (Macerata version).

== Awards ==
Negrin's production of Orlando at The Royal Opera House in London was nominated for two Laurence Olivier Awards in 2004: "Best new opera production" and "Outstanding achievement in opera" (for Bejun Mehta).

His production of Giulio Cesare for Opera Australia won several Green Room Awards in 1995, including best opera director and best opera production.

Negrin's second production of Giulio Cesare, the one for the Royal Danish opera in Copenhagen, won the Årets Reumert Award for best opera production in 2003, while Negrin's production of Partenope for the same company was nominated for the award in 2009.
