= Berzhansky =

Berzhansky (Russian: Бержанский), feminine Berzhanskaya (Russian: Бержанская), is a Russian surname. The Lithuanized form is Beržanskis. Notable people with the surname include:

- Vasilisa Berzhanskaya (born 1993), Russian operatic mezzo-soprano

== See also ==
- Yevdokiya Bershanskaya
