= The Thirteenth Child =

Opera by Poul Ruders

- Opera by Poul Ruders
- Librettist: Becky Starobin, David Starobin
- Language: English
- Based on: "The Twelve Brothers" by Brothers Grimm
- Premiere: 27 July 2019; Santa Fe Opera

The Thirteenth Child is an English-language opera in two acts, composed by Danish composer Poul Ruders in 2016, to a libretto by Ruders's manager Becky Starobin and her husband, guitarist David Starobin. The opera, Ruders fifth, is inspired by the fairytale "The Twelve Brothers".

Prior to being performed on stage, the opera was recorded for the Starobin family's Bridge Records label.

The premiere production was commissioned by Santa Fe Opera and the Odense Symfoniorkester.

== Performance history ==
The opera premiered on 27 July 2019 at Santa Fe Opera. Paul Daniel conducted the staging by Darko Tresnjak, the set was designed by Alexander Dodge, costumes designed by Rita Ryack, lighting design by York Kennedy, projection design by Aaron Rhyne, chorus master was Susanne Sheston.

== Roles ==
Roles, voice types, premiere cast
Role	Voice type	Premiere cast, 27 July 2019 Conductor: Paul Daniel
King Hjarne of Frohagord	paranoid bass	David Leigh
Queen Gertrude of Frohagord	tragic contralto	Tamara Mumford
Lyra, Princess of Frohagord	innocent soprano	Jessica E. Jones
Frederic, Prince of Hauven	proud tenor	Joshua Dennis
Drokan, Regent of the kingdom of Hauven	scheming bass-baritone	Bradley Garvin
Benjamin, youngest Prince of Frohagord	good-hearted tenor	Billy Bruley
Corbin, eldest Prince of Frohagord	worried bass	David Leigh
Toke, second eldest Prince	worried tenor	Anthony Ciaramitaro

== Instrumentation ==
2 clarinets, 2 saxophones, 2 bassoons, 4 horns in F, 2 trumpets in B♭, 2 trombones, tuba, 2 percussion sections, harp, piano, 3 synthesizers, 10 violins, 8 violas, 6 cellos, 2 double bass.

== Recording ==
- 2019 Odense Symphony Orchestra, Bridge Academy Singers, soprano Sarah Shafer (Lyra), mezzo-soprano Tamara Mumford (Queen Gertrude), bass-baritone Ashraf Sewailam (Drokan), bass Matt Boehler (King Hjarne), tenor David Portillo (Benjamin), tenor Alasdair Kent (Prince Frederic, Toke), bass Alex Rosen (Corbin). Conductors: David Starobin, Benjamin Shwartz (Bridge 9527)
