= Giovanni Maria Quaglio the Younger =

Italian painter (1772–1813)

Giovanni Maria Quaglio the Younger (1772–1813) was an Italian architect, painter, and stage designer active in Munich, a member of the large Quaglio pedigree. He was born at Laino. He studied at Rome, Naples, Milan, and Venice, and became a court scene-painter in 1793 in Munich. He was the son of Lorenzo Quaglio the Elder.
