= Franz Quaglio =

German painter (1844–1920)

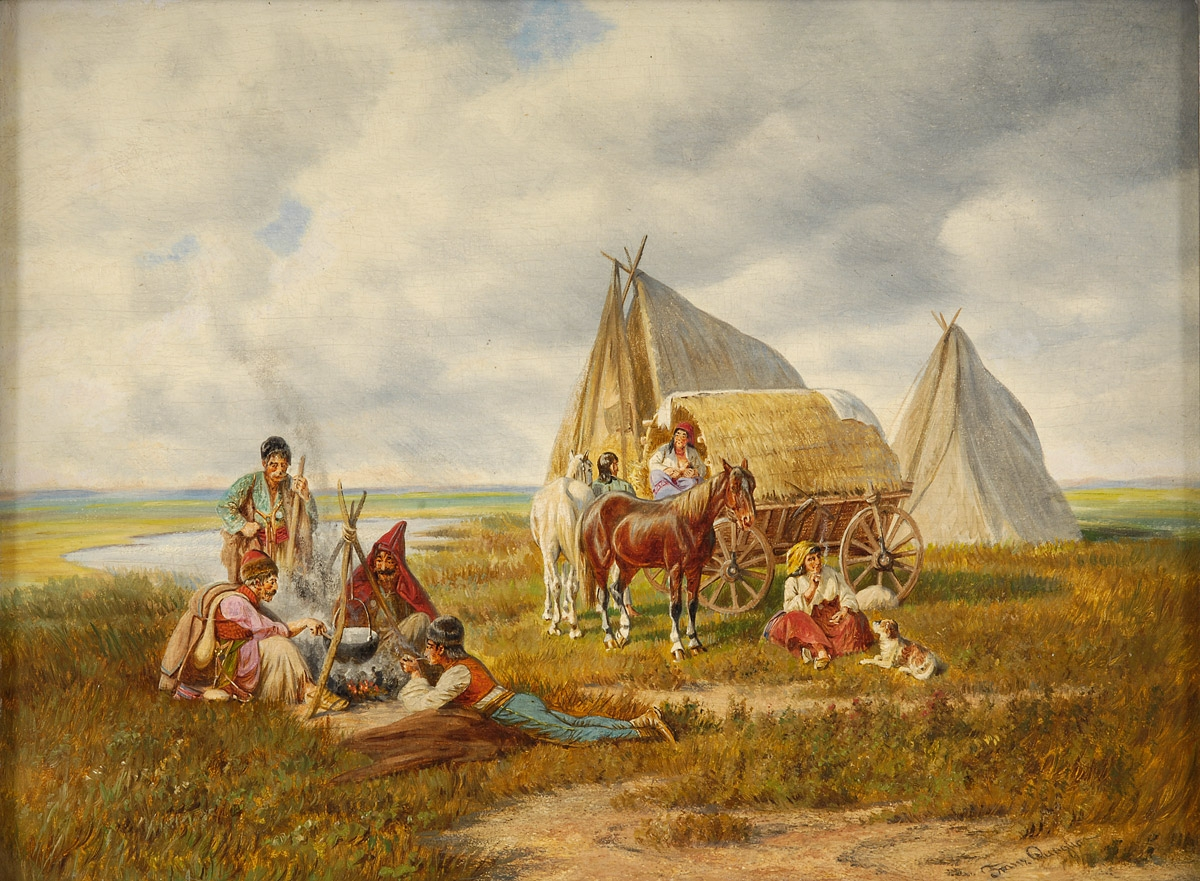
A Rest Stop in the Puszta (date unknown)

Franz Quaglio (22 April 1844 – 19 February 1920) was a German painter from a branch of the Quaglio painting family that had settled in Munich during the 18th Century.

== Life ==
Born in Munich, he was the son of the painter Simon Quaglio, who gave him his first art lessons. In 1862, he enrolled at the Munich Academy of Fine Arts, where he studied under Franz Adam. He specialized in rural genre scenes, occasionally treating more dramatic subjects such as soldiers and acrobats. His chief influences were his uncle Lorenzo Quaglio and Carl Theodor von Piloty, later deriving some techniques from the impressionists. He was a very prolific painter and travelled extensively, visiting Turkey, Greece and the Caucasus. Although he never held a formal teaching position, he often gave private art lessons. One of his best-known students was Vilma Lwoff-Parlaghy. Quaglio died in 1920 in Wasserburg am Inn.
