= Louise Bertin =

French composer and poet

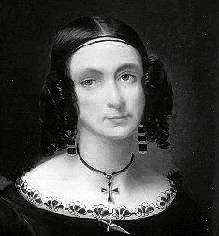
Louise Bertin (1805-1877)

Louise-Angélique Bertin (French pronunciation: [lwiz ɑ̃ʒelik bɛʁtɛ̃]; 15 January 1805 – 26 April 1877) was a French composer and poet.

== Life and music ==
Bertin was born in Les Roches, Essonne, France. Her father, Louis-François Bertin, and also later her brother, were the editors of Journal des débats, an influential newspaper. As encouraged by her family, Bertin pursued music. She received lessons from François-Joseph Fétis, who directed a private family performance of Guy Mannering, Bertin's first opera, in 1825. This opera, never formally produced, took its storyline from the book of the same name by Sir Walter Scott. Two years later, Bertin's second opera, Le loup-garou, was produced at the Opéra-Comique.

At age 21, Bertin began working on the opera semiseria Fausto to her own libretto in Italian, based on Goethe's Faust, a subject "almost certainly suggested" by her father. A performance of the opera was scheduled for 1830, but due to many unforeseen complications, Fausto did not reach the stage until 1831. It was not well received and had only three performances.

Shortly before this, Bertin became friends with Victor Hugo. Hugo had sketched out an operatic version of his book Notre-Dame de Paris (The Hunchback of Notre-Dame) and between the two of them, the opera La Esmeralda was born, Hugo providing the libretto. Bertin was the only composer to collaborate directly with Hugo on an opera. But as the opera's run began in 1836, there were accusations against Bertin and her family, claiming she had special privileges due to her brother Armand's connection to the government's opera administration. During the seventh performance, a riot erupted, and La Esmeralda's run was forced to end, though a version of it continued to be performed over the next three years. The composer Hector Berlioz, who helped Bertin with the staging and production of La Esmeralda, was also accused of providing the better music of this work, a charge he vehemently denied. In frustration, Bertin refused to write any more operas. In 1837, Franz Liszt transcribed the orchestral score for solo piano (S.476) and made a piano transcription of the "Air chanté par Massol" (S.477).

Bertin did continue to compose in many other genres. Her later compositions include twelve cantatas, six piano ballades, five chamber symphonies, a few string quartets, a piano trio (which includes themes from both Fausto and La Esmeralda), and many vocal selections. Of these, only the ballades and the trio were published.

== Poetry ==
Bertin also wrote and published two volumes of poetry, Les Glanes in 1842 and Nouvelles Glanes in 1876. Les Glanes received a prize from the Académie française. Bertin died in Paris the year after the publication of Nouvelles Glanes.

== Selected Works ==
=== Chamber ===
- Piano Trio, Opus 10
- String Quartets

=== Opera ===
- Fausto (1831)
- La Esmerelda (1836)
- Le loup-garou (1827)

=== Solo Piano ===
- Reviens!

=== Vocal ===
- L'hirondelle
- Pardon!!

== Recordings ==
- La Esmeralda, with Maya Boog (soprano); Manuel Núñez Camelino (tenor) as Phoebus; Francesco Ellero d’Artegna (bass) as Claude Frollo; and Frédéric Antoun (tenor) as Quasimodo; Orchestre national de Montpellier, conducted by Lawrence Foster; Festival de Radio France et Montpellier; label: Accord.
- Fausto, with Karine Deshayes (mezzo-soprano) as Fausto; Karina Gauvin (soprano) as Margarita; Marie Gautrot (mezzo-soprano) as Catarina; Diana Axentii (soprano) as Marta, a witch; Nico Darmanin (tenor) as Valentino; Thibault de Damas (baritone) as Wagner, an auctioeer; Ante Jerkunica (bass) as Mefistofele; Les Talens Lyriques and the Flemish Radio Choir, conducted by Christophe Rousset. Label: Palazzo Bru Zane. (2022)

== External Resources ==
Free scores by Louise Bertin at the International Music Score Library Project (IMSLP)
