= Beržanskis =

- Lithuanian surname
- m.: Beržanskis
- f.: (unmarried): Beržanskytė
- f.: (married): Beržanskienė
- Related names: Berzhansky

Beržanskis is a Lithuanian surname. Notable people with the surname include:

- Jonas Beržanskis (1862–1936), Lithuanian historian, journalist, public figure
- Justinas Beržanskis (born 1989), Lithuanian steeplechase runner
