= Ifigenia in Tauride (Traetta) =

1763 opera by Tommaso Traetta

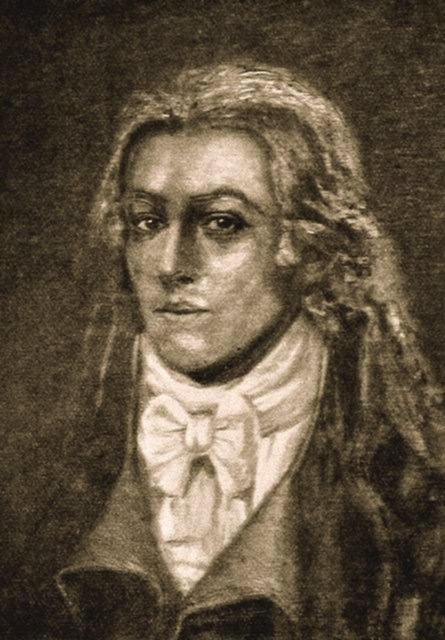
Tommaso Traetta

Ifigenia in Tauride is an opera in three acts by Tommaso Traetta to a libretto by Marco Coltellini. It premiered on 4 October 1763 at Schönbrunn Palace, Vienna. The opera was revived at the Schwetzingen Festival in December 2013 conducted by Wolfgang Katschner.

== Roles ==
Roles, voice types, premiere cast
Role	Voice type	Premiere cast, 4 October 1763 Conductor: Tommaso Traetta Choreography: Gasparo Angiolini Scenography: Giovanni Maria Quaglio
Oreste	contralto castrato	Gaetano Guadagni
Pilade	soprano castrato	Giovanni Toschi
Ifigenia	soprano	Rosa Tartaglini
Toante	tenor	Giuseppe Tibaldi
Dori	soprano	Maria Sartori
Chorus: Virgins, priestesses, soldiers, citizens, Furies
