= Vilma Lwoff-Parlaghy =

Hungarian artist (1863–1923)

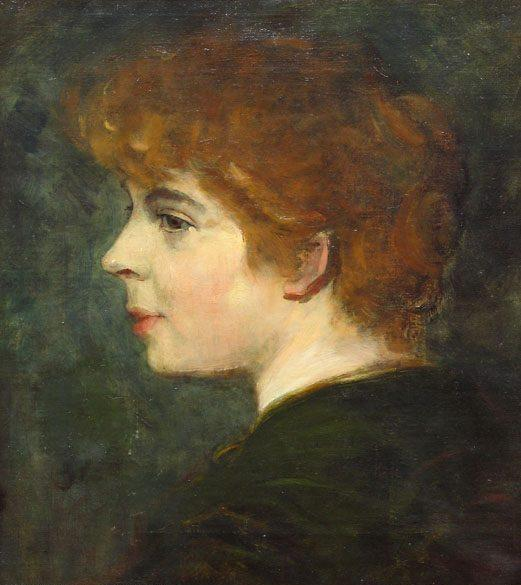
- Self-Portrait, 1880s; Nordfriesland Museum, Husum
- Born: Elisabeth von Parlaghy; 15 April 1863; Hungary
- Died: 28 August 1923 (aged 60); New York City, New York, U.S.
- Known for: Portrait painting

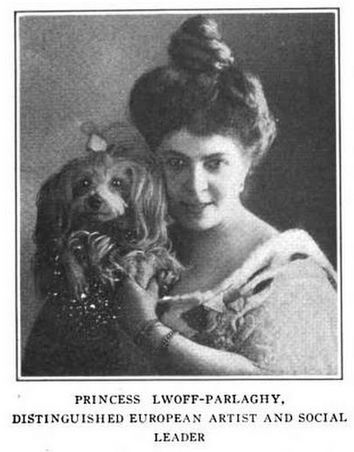
Lwoff-Parlaghy with dog, from a 1908 publication.

Princess Elisabeth Vilma Lwoff-Parlaghy (born Brachfeld Vilma Erzsébet; 15 April 1863 – 28 August 1923) was a Hungarian-born portrait painter during the Belle Époque, active in Germany and the United States. She is known to have painted about 120 portraits of prominent Americans and Europeans between 1884 and 1923.

== Early life ==
She was born in Hajdúdorog. Elisabeth von Parlaghy received her education as an artist in Budapest and later by Franz Quaglio and Wilhelm Dürr the Younger in Munich, where she adopted the style of Franz von Lenbach. A portrait of her mother gained her public notice in Berlin in 1890.

That year, controversy erupted over a portrait either of von Moltke or of the German Emperor William II; sources vary. It was rejected on its initial submission by the jury of the International Exposition at Berlin, but restored at the personal request, or order, of the Emperor.

Her exhibition of portraits in the Salon de Paris from 1892 to 1894 brought her further public notice.

Lwoff-Parlaghy exhibited her work at the Palace of Fine Arts and The Woman's Building at the 1893 World's Columbian Exposition in Chicago, Illinois.

In 1896 she first visited New York City. In 1899, she married in Prague the Russian Prince Georgy Lvov (or Lwow/Lwoff, born 1862 in Russia), the future head of the Russian Provisional Government (1917); they were quickly divorced, though she continued to style herself the "Princess Lwoff-Parlaghy" using her artist name with the authorization of Prince Lvov. The Prince also continued to provide her with a permanent annual allowance. She again visited New York in 1899, where her portrait of Admiral George Dewey became the basis of further success. Returning to Europe in 1900, she had a daughter, Wilhelmina Nors, whose father, Peter Nors, a Danish officer or minister, was the Princess' companion at that time (at least 1905). Her daughter, Wilhelmina Nors (usually Vilma Nors), was born in August 1906 in Britain and raised by a nanny in London. She hardly knew her mother but became a painter and copyist herself in Paris and Nice. Princess Lwoff-Parlaghy also lived in Berlin and Nice, between 1900 and 1908, before her permanent return to New York in 1908.

== Manhattan ==
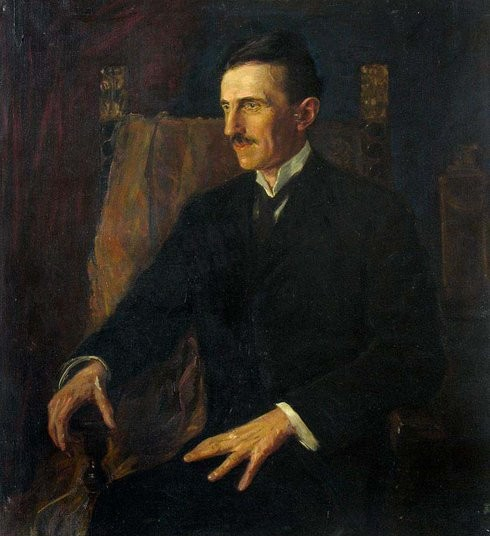
Nikola Tesla, the so-called Blue Portrait, 1916

In Manhattan she lived stylishly in a fourteen-room suite on the third floor of the new Plaza Hotel, which included a private chapel; her retinue there included a personal surgeon and a chamberlain, as well as a pet lion named "Goldfleck". When "Goldfleck" died she buried him at the Hartsdale Pet Cemetery.

The Princess had seen the lion cub at Ringling Brothers circus and asked to buy him, but the circus owners refused. However, they agreed to sell him to American Civil War hero Daniel E. Sickles - whose portrait the Princess had recently painted. He gave the cub immediately to the grateful Princess as a gift.

She became known as a 5th Avenue portraitist, partly as a result of a well-publicized 1911 visit to her cousin Abbott Lawrence Lowell, then President of Harvard, during which she travelled to Boston by private railway car and insisted on dining off her own solid-gold dinnerware.

In 1913 she celebrated her fiftieth birthday with an exhibition of a series of her German portraits in the Plaza. In 1916 she moved to Park Avenue, commencing her residence with the presentation of a portrait of John Burroughs; that same year she presented her so-called "blue portrait" of the inventor Nikola Tesla in her studio at 109 East 39th Street. This was the only portrait Tesla sat for during his life. She celebrated her sixtieth birthday in 1923 with an exhibition of what she called her Manhattan Hall of Fame in the Carlton on Madison Avenue.

"No one knew where the princess’s money came from, but in 1914, when World War I broke out in Europe, her once-abundant wealth suddenly vanished. Soon after, she was dogged by her lawyer, banker and the stables where she boarded her horses, for nonpayment. She fled, leaving her Plaza suite, an unpaid bill for $12,000, her paintings (taken by the Plaza) and numerous belongings behind. In 1923, she died in a cramped room on East 39th Street, surrounded by her unsold artwork and a single maid for a companion, with a line of creditors waiting outside her door."

When Princess Lwoff-Parlaghy died in 1923 in New York the poet Edwin Markham gave her funeral oration. She is buried in Woodlawn Cemetery in the Bronx.

== Selected portraits ==
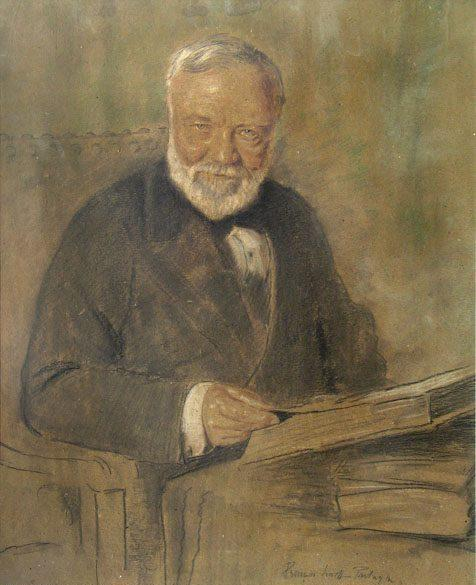
Andrew Carnegie

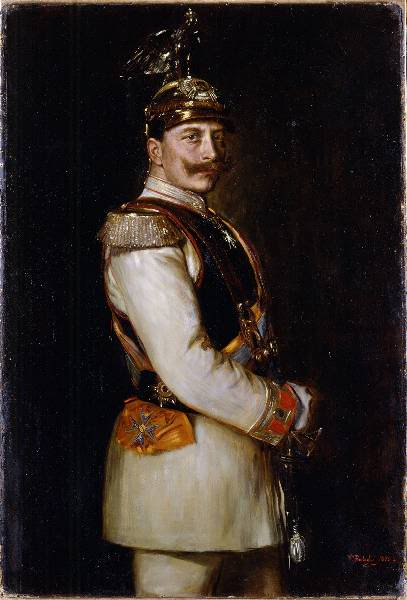
Kaiser Wilhelm II

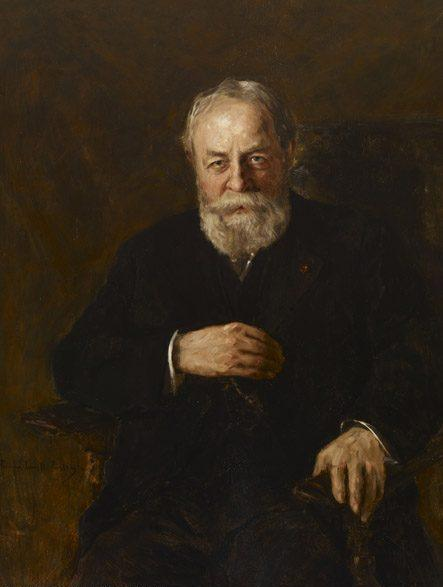
John Burroughs

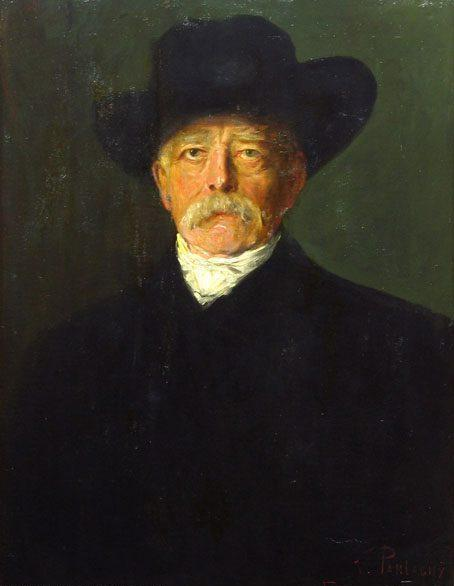
Otto von Bismarck

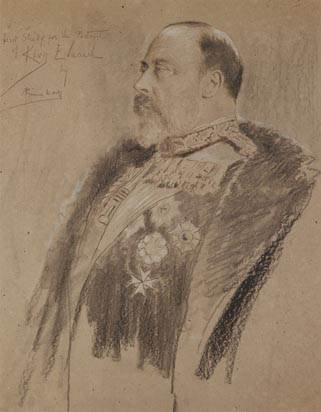
King Edward VII
- Elisabeth of Bavaria, Queen of Belgium
- August Belmont, Jr.
- Leo von Caprivi
- Caroline Dutcher Sterling Choate
- William Conant Church
- Chauncey M. Depew
- George Dewey
- Thomas Alva Edison
- Daniel Chester French
- Myron T. Herrick
- Friedrich Hirth
- Seth Low
- Edwin Markham
- Hudson Maxim
- Helmuth von Moltke the Elder
- Alton B. Parker
- Henry Phipps
- Horace Porter
- Ernst Gunther, Duke of Schleswig-Holstein
- Daniel E. Sickles
- Charles Dwight Sigsbee
- Benjamin Tracy
- James Grant Wilson

Most of these portraits were part of the "Manhattan Hall of Fame" exhibition, 1923.

== Bibliography ==
- Cornelius Steckner: Die New Yorker Malerfürstin Vilma Princess Lwoff-Parlaghy, in: Bilder aus der Neuen und der Alten Welt, 1993, 34–41; 152–156.
