= List of operas by Florian Leopold Gassmann =

This is a list of the operas by Florian Leopold Gassmann (1729–1774).

== List ==
Title	Genre	Subdivisions	Libretto	Première date	Place, theatre
Merope	opera seria	3 acts	Apostolo Zeno	Carnival 1757	Venice, Teatro San Moisè
Issipile	opera seria	3 acts	Metastasio	Carnival 1758	Venice, San Moisè
Gli uccellatori	dramma giocoso	3 acts	Carlo Goldoni	Carnival 1759	Venice, San Moisè
Filosofia in amore	dramma giocoso	3 acts	Carlo Goldoni	Carnival 1760	Venice, San Moisè
Catone in Utica	opera seria	3 acts	Metastasio	29 April 1761	Venice, Teatro San Samuele
Ezio	opera seria	3 acts	Metastasio	1761	Florence, Teatro della Pergola
Un pazzo ne fa cento	dramma giocoso	3 acts		Autumn 1762	Venice, San Moisè
L'olimpiade	opera seria	3 acts	Metastasio	18 October 1764	Vienna, Theater am Kärntnertor
Il trionfo d'amore	azione teatrale	1 act	Metastasio	25 January 1765	Vienna, Schönbrunn Palace
Achille in Sciro	opera seria	3 acts	Metastasio	Spring 1766	Venice, Teatro San Giovanni Grisostomo
Il viaggiatore ridicolo	dramma giocoso	3 acts	Carlo Goldoni	25 May 1766	Vienna, Theater am Kärntnertor
L'amore artigiano	dramma giocoso	3 acts	Carlo Goldoni	26 April 1767	Vienna, Burgtheater
Amore e Psiche	opera seria	3 acts	Marco Coltellini	5 October 1767	Vienna, Burgtheater
La notte critica	opera buffa	3 acts	Carlo Goldoni	5 January 1768	Vienna, Burgtheater
L'opera seria	commedia per musica	3 acts	Ranieri de' Calzabigi and Metastasio	1769	Vienna, Burgtheater
La contessina	dramma giocoso	3 acts	Marco Coltellini after Carlo Goldoni	3 September 1770	Mährisch-Neustadt
Il filosofo innamorato	dramma giocoso	3 acts	Marco Coltellini	1771	Vienna, Burgtheater
Le pescatrici	dramma giocoso	3 acts	Carlo Goldoni	1771	Vienna, Burgtheater
Don Quischott von Mancia (Acts 1 and 2 by Giovanni Paisiello)	commedia	3 acts	Giovanni Battista Lorenzi	1771	Vienna, Burgtheater
I rovinati	commedia	3 acts	Giovanni Antonio Gastone Boccherini	23 June 1772	Vienna, Burgtheater
La casa di campagna	dramma giocoso	3 acts	Giovanni Antonio Gastone Boccherini	3 or 13 February 1773	Vienna, Burgtheater
