= Kafka's Trial =

Opera by Poul Ruders

Proces Kafka (Kafka's Trial) is an opera by Poul Ruders to a libretto by Paul Bentley which premiered on March 12, 2005 at the Copenhagen Opera House in Denmark. It was commissioned by the opera house as the opening to their 2005 season. A Danish-language translation of the libretto was done by Karen Hoffmann.

== Plot ==
The plot and libretto were based on scenes from Kafka's unfinished 1925 novel The Trial, with additional letters from Kafka's own life telling his relationships with Felice Bauer and Grete Bloch.

== Reviews ==
The reception of Ruders' opera was incredibly praiseworthy according to public reviews. Eva White of Christian Daily (Kristeligt Dagblad) called the opera a "tough nut to crack" but praised Bentley and Ruders for their work, although calling the singer's Danish pronunciation "lousy." Anthony Tommasini of The New York Times called the performance, "a brilliant achievement: a grotesquely comic, bitterly satirical and, ultimately, deeply moving work that hooks you for two onrushing and uninterrupted hours." Andrew Clements of The Guardian was less praiseworthy, "Above all, it's a fine company showcase for the new theatre; the trouble is, there should be more to it than that."

== Roles ==
Roles	Voice Part
Franz Kafka	Dramatic-lyric tenor
Felice Baur	Dramatic-lyric soprano
GW	Supernumerary
Greta Bloch	Dramatic-lyric mezzo
Three zanies	Supernumerary
Chorus	[mixed]

== Recording ==
- Kafka's Trial Johnny van Hal, Gisela Stille, Marianne Rørholm & Gert Henning Jensen The Royal Danish Orchestra and Opera Choir, Thomas Søndergård 2CD
