= Fausto (opera) =

1831 opera by Louise Bertin

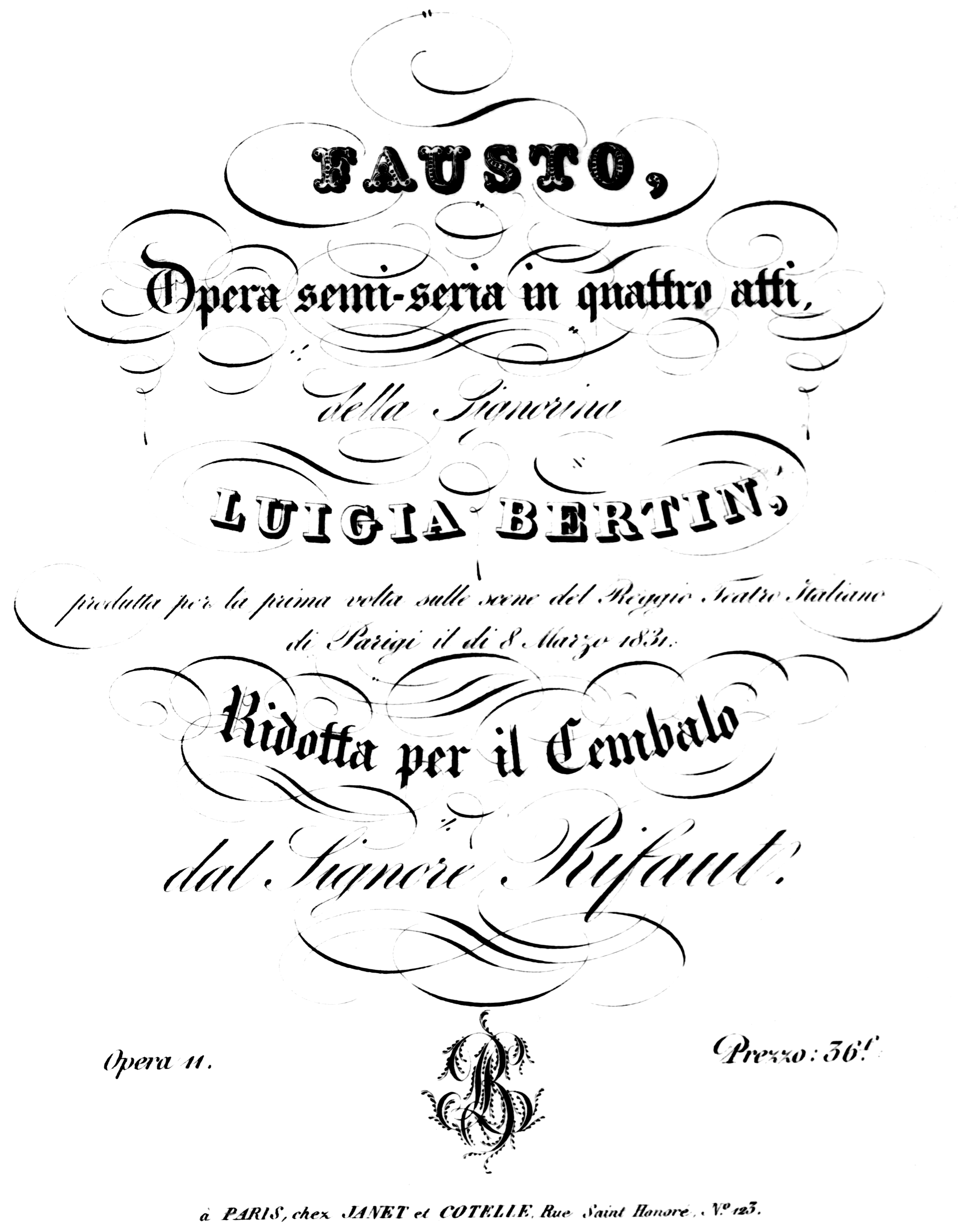

Fausto (Faust) is an 1831 Italian opera semiseria in four acts by French composer Louise Bertin. It was premiered on 7 March 1831 by the Théâtre-Italien in Paris, and ran for three performances. The premiere was sung in Italian, and acts 3 and 4 were combined into a single act 3 of two tableaux. Bertin had adapted the libretto from Goethe's Faust, Part One, writing it in French and commissioning Luigi Balocchi, the Théâtre-Italien's chief librettist, to translate it into Italian. The premiere was originally planned for 1830 with the contralto Rosmunda Pisaroni intended for the title role but was postponed due to the revolution of July 1830. At the premiere, the role was transposed for tenor Domenico Donzelli.

== Roles ==
Role	Voice type	Premiere cast, 7 March 1831
Fausto	tenor (originally contralto)	Domenico Donzelli
Margarita	soprano	Henriette Méric-Lalande
Mefistofele	bass or baritone	Vincenzo-Felice Santini
Catarina	contralto or mezzo-soprano	Marianna Rossi
Valentino	tenor	Marco Bordogni
Wagner	bass-baritone	Lodovico Graziani
Marta	mezzo-soprano	
A witch	contralto	Clorinda Corradi
A town crier	bass-baritone	
Chorus: Angels, demons, townsfolk

== Synopsis ==
Place: Germany
Time: 16th century

=== Act 1: La tentazione (The Temptation) ===
Faust's laboratory with a window at the back overlooking a church

Scene 1. After a long life of study, Fausto is bored (Introduction: "Tutte volsi e rivolsi"/"All the twists and turns"). He sees no further meaning in his life and has prepared a poisoned chalice to end it (Aria: "Il vago sol del mondo"/"The faint sun of the world"). As he raises the chalice to his lips, church bells ring out, and a choir sings sacred songs, awakening memories of happier times (Scene with chorus: "Qual m'assorda rumor?"/"What noise deafens me?").

Scene 2. Faust's servant Wagner announces the arrival of a desperate young girl who needs his help.

Scene 3. Margarita, after some hesitation, reveals that a friend living with her is terminally ill (Trio (Fausto/Wagner/Margarita): "Vezzosa giovinetta"/"Pretty young girl"). She hopes that Fausto can heal her. Fausto, immediately captivated by Margarita's beauty, sets off with her.

Scene 4. Wagner watches them anxiously. He has not missed the way Fausto looked at the girl.

Scene 5. Upon his return, Fausto is inwardly distraught. He orders that no one be allowed into his room.

Scene 6. Fausto is obsessed with winning Margarita, even though his age seems to be an obstacle.

Scene 7. In his distress, Fausto calls upon Satan for help (Duet (Fausto/Mefistofele): "Sorgi al mio cenno, o Satana"/"Arise at my command, O Satan"). Mefistofele appears and promises him the fulfillment of all his desires. Margarita will be his, and he will be young again. In this world, he will serve Fausto, but in the underworld, their roles will be reversed.

The dwelling of a witch, inhabited by demons of all kinds

Scene 8. The demons enthusiastically greet Fausto's arrival (Finale: "Zitto, zitto, state attenti"/"Hush, hush, be careful"). Mefistofele explains that the required magic potion can only work if it is prepared by the witch herself. However, she is not at home (Scene with chorus: "Dite, amici, ove n’andò la vecchia?"/"Tell me, friends, where did the old woman go?"). As Fausto is about to leave, he is utterly enraptured when he sees the image of Margarita in a magic mirror. Mefistofele and the demons now know that he has fallen into their trap. Finally, the witch returns and gives Fausto the potion. The demons surround him until he emerges from their circle, rejuvenated (Witches' Scene: "Qual sovramana possa"/"What superhuman power").

=== Act 2: La felicità (Happiness) ===
A Street in the Evening

Scene 1. In front of Catarina's house, old women are busy with needlework, while Margarita and her friends sing a song about fickle love (Canzonette and chorus: “Fuggite amor”/"Flee Cupid"). Fausto and Mefistofele listen to them silently until old Catarina urges them to leave. When Margarita's young neighbor Marta invites everyone to the fair the next day, Margarita declines because she has to go to church. She enters the house.

Scene 2. Because Margarita has closed the door behind her, Mefistofele asks Fausto for a little patience.

Scene 3. Margarita comes out briefly again. Fausto declares his love for her, which Margarita seems to reciprocate (Duet (Fausto/Margarita): “Signora amabile”/"Lovely lady"). When he tries to take her hand, however, she pulls away and runs off.

Margarita's Room

Scene 4. Margarita reflects on her feelings for Fausto (Scene: "Chi sarà mai quel vago"/"Who will he be") and finally decides to banish her fears (Cavatina: "Palpita nel seno gelido il cor"/"My heart beats in my icy breast").

Scene 5. Catarina brings Margarita a basket of laundry. The girl goes into the garden to fetch the rest.

Scene 6. Meanwhile, Mefistofele flatters Catarina (Duet (Mefistofele/Catarina): "Vi saluto, madama"/"Greetings Madam"). He asks if he can introduce her to his friend Fausto.

Catarina's Garden

Scene 7. While walking in the garden, Margarita confesses her love to Fausto and promises to secretly let him into her room. Meanwhile, Catarina falls prey to Mephistopheles' flattery (Finale: "Fra quell'ombra"/"Among these shadows").

=== Act 3: Il misfatto (The Crime) ===
[to be translated]

=== Act 4: La pena (The Punishment) ===
[to be translated]

== Recording ==
- 2023 (sung in Italian): Karine Deshayes (mezzo-soprano) as Fausto, Karina Gauvin (soprano) as Margarita, Ante Jerkunica (bass) as Mefistofele, Nico Darmanin (tenor) as Valentino, Marie Gautrot (mezzo-soprano) as Catarina, Diana Axentil (mezzo-soprano) as Witch/Marta, Thibault de Damas (bass-baritone) as Wagner/Town Crier. Flemish Radio Choir; Les Talens Lyriques, Christophe Rousset, conductor. Recorded 15–18 June 2023, La Seine Musicale, Paris. CD: Palazetto Bru Zane.
