= Florian Leopold Gassmann =

Bohemian opera composer (1729–1774)

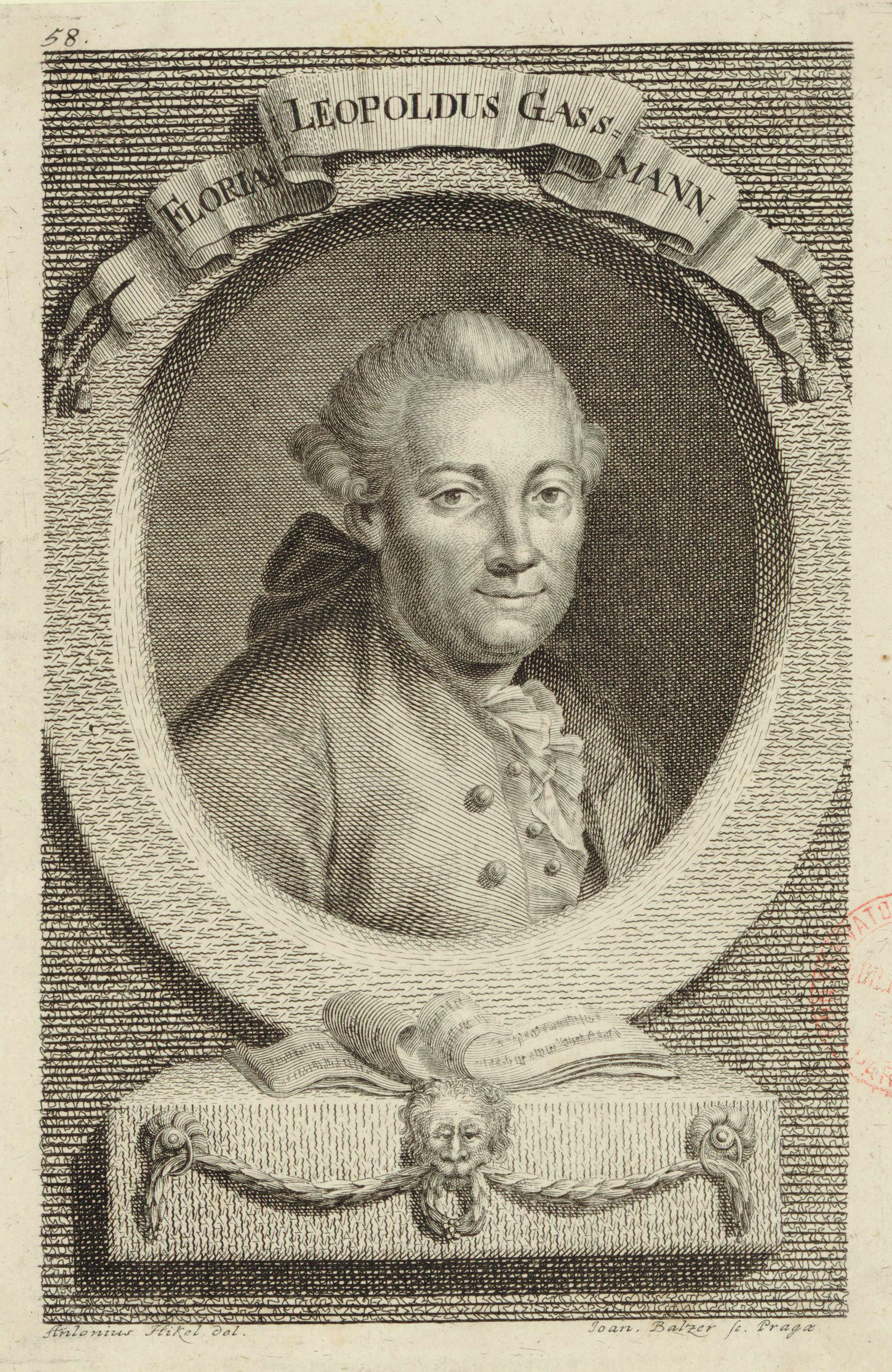
Florian Leopold Gassmann, engraving (1775) by Johann Balzer

Florian Leopold Gassmann (3 May 1729 – 21 January 1774) was a German-speaking Bohemian opera composer of the transitional period between the baroque and classical eras. He was one of the principal composers of dramma giocoso immediately before Mozart. He was one of Antonio Salieri's teachers.

== Life and career ==
Gassmann was born in Brüx, Bohemia, and was most likely trained by Johann Woborschil, the local chorus master. His father was a goldsmith who may well have opposed his son's choice of a musical career.

From 1757 until 1762, he wrote an opera every year for the carnival season in Venice, and was also appointed choirmaster in the girls' conservatory in Venice in 1757. Many of the librettos he set were by the renowned Venetian playwright Carlo Goldoni.

In 1763 he was called to Vienna as court ballet composer, and was held in great affection by Emperor Joseph II. In 1764 he was appointed chamber composer to the Emperor, and in 1772 court conductor.

In 1766 Gassmann met up-and-coming young Antonio Salieri in Venice, invited him to return with him to Vienna and taught him composition using Johann Joseph Fux's textbook Gradus ad Parnassum. Salieri remained in Vienna, and succeeded Gassmann as chamber composer to the Emperor on the latter's death in 1774. Another Italian composer, Giuseppe Bonno, succeeded Gassmann as court conductor.

In 1771, Gassmann founded the Tonkünstler-Societät (Society of Musical Artists), which was the first group in Vienna to give concerts for the general public, and for the benefit of its members' widows and orphans. He wrote his oratorio La Betulia liberata for that purpose.

In 1774, he died in Vienna from long-term consequences of a carriage accident sustained on his final visit to Italy.

Gassmann's two daughters, Anna Fuchs and Therese Rosenbaum, were both famous singers trained by Salieri; the younger, Therese, made a particular name for herself as a Mozart interpreter.

Charles Burney, in one of his published accounts of his many European tours surveying the musical scene, recalls, on a visit to Joseph II and his court, meeting Gassmann and finding him very forthcoming. Among the manuscripts Gassmann showed him, he reserved most of his praise for his chamber works. Burney was either not exposed to, or said nothing about, Gassmann's orchestral music.

Johann Baptist Wanhal is described by author Daniel Heartz as Gassmann's "protégé".

== Major works ==
=== Operas ===
See List of operas by Florian Leopold Gassmann.

=== Cantatas ===
- Amore, e venere (1768)
- L’amor timido

=== Oratorios ===
- La Betulia Liberata (1772)

=== Sacred music ===
- Five masses

=== Instrumental music ===
Includes:

- 32 symphonies
- 26 overtures
- 37 string quartets include: Op. 1 six quartetti (H 431–6); Op. 2 (H 441–2, 435, 444–6); six published posthumously, 1804 (H 451–6)
- 8 string quintets, 6 of which were published as Op. 2 in 1772 (H 501–506)
- string trios
- 6 trios for flute, violin and viola
- 10 wind quintets
