= Poul Ruders =

Danish composer

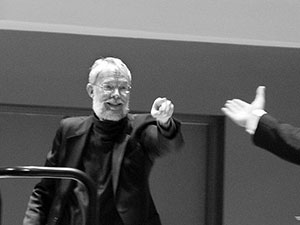
Poul Ruders

Poul Ruders (born 27 March 1949) is a Danish composer.

== Life ==
Born in Ringsted, Ruders trained as an organist, and studied orchestration with Karl Aage Rasmussen. Ruders's first compositions date from the mid-1960s. Ruders regards his own compositional development as a gradual one, with his true voice emerging with the chamber concerto, Four Compositions, of 1980. His notable students include Marc Mellits.

Minor planet 5888 Ruders discovered by Eleanor Helin and Schelte J. Bus is named after him.

== Music ==
Ruders has created a large body of music ranging from opera and orchestral works through chamber, vocal and solo music in a variety of styles, from the Vivaldi pastiche of his first violin concerto (1981) to the explosive modernism of Manhattan Abstraction (1982).

Other works include the operas Tycho (1986), The Handmaid's Tale (1998, with libretto by Paul Bentley), Proces Kafka / Kafka's Trial (2005, again with libretto by Bentley), Selma Ježková (2007, after Trier's Dancer in the Dark), and the fairytale opera The Thirteenth Child (2016), five symphonies, four string quartets, Violin Concerto No. 1 (1981), Etude and Ricercare (1994) for guitar, for David Starobin, The Bells (songs) with Lucy Shelton, soprano, and the Christmas Gospel (1994) and two piano sonatas; Abysm (2000) for Birmingham Contemporary Music Group. Ruders has written several works for the American guitarist and promoter of new music David Starobin: Psalmodies (1989) and Paganini Variations for guitar and orchestra (1999–2000), and Psalmodies Suite (1990), Etude and Ricercare (1994) and Chaconne (1996) for solo guitar. Ruders has composed a Concerto in Pieces (1995), which is a set of variations on the "Witches' Chorus" from Purcell's opera Dido and Aeneas.

His fourth symphony, An organ symphony, (with a significant part for organ) was a joint international commission by the Dallas Symphony Orchestra, Odense Symphony Orchestra and the City of Birmingham Symphony Orchestra. The world premiere took place in the Morton H. Meyerson Symphony Center, Dallas, Texas, 20 January 2011.

Writing about Ruders, the English critic Stephen Johnson states: "He can be gloriously, explosively extrovert one minute – withdrawn, haunted, intently inward-looking the next. Super-abundant high spirits alternate with pained, almost expressionistic lyricism; simplicity and directness with astringent irony."
