= Giovanni Maria Quaglio the Elder =

Austrian stage designer

Giovanni Maria Quaglio (c. 1700–1765) was an Austrian stage designer of Italian extraction. He studied in Rome and Milan. He worked mainly in Vienna, where he designed the original production of Christoph Willibald Gluck's Orfeo ed Euridice in 1762.
