= Vasilisa Berzhanskaya =

Russian opera singer

- Born: 13 December 1993 (age 31); Yessentuki, Russia
- Occupation: Operatic mezzo-soprano
- Website: vasilisaberzhanskaya.com

Vasilisa Berzhanskaya (Russian: Василиса Михайловна Бержанская; born 13 December 1993) is a Russian operatic mezzo-soprano. Her repertoire encompasses roles of the Italian bel canto of Rossini and Bellini, Mozart, Baroque music such as Vivaldi and Purcell, and roles from Russian opera, by composers such as Rimsky-Korsakov and Tchaikovsky. Though Berzhanskaya is a mezzo-soprano, in the past she has sung roles ranging from dramatic coloratura soprano (the Queen of the Night in Die Zauberflöte) to contralto (Isabella in L'italiana in Algeri). As such, she has been described as possessing "a huge vocal range in which she display[s] impeccable coloratura."

== Early life and education ==
Berzhanskaya studied at the Stavropol Territorial Musical College and also the Gnessin Russian Academy of Music. She sang as a soprano in the first years of her career, and her repertoire included the Queen of the Night in Die Zauberflöte, Musetta in La bohème, Micaëla and Frasquita in Carmen, the Swan Princess in The Tale of Tsar Saltan, and the title role of Massenet's Thaïs.

== Career ==
In 2011/12, Berzhanskaya was soloist with the North-Caucasian State Philharmonic, and in 2014 with State Primorsky Opera and Ballet Theater in Vladivostok as guest soloist. From 2015 to 2017, Berzhanskaya was a member of the Young Artists Opera Program of the Bolshoi Theatre, where she made her debut in 2016. It was during her time at the Bolshoi Theatre that she made a transition to mezzo-soprano roles. Berzhanskaya's international career began in 2015 with performances at Carnegie Hall and Tonhalle, Zürich, with the International Musical Olympus Festival. In 2016, she appeared at the Rossini Opera Festival in Pesaro as La Marchesa Melibea in Il viaggio a Reims in a production by Emilio Sagi, after studying with Alberto Zedda in the Accademia Rossiniana. In 2017, she took part in the Young Singers Project of the Salzburger Festspiele where she sang Frau Pfeil in Mozart's Der Schauspieldirektor. From 2017 to 2019, she was an Ensemble member of the Deutsche Oper Berlin, where her repertoire included Rosina in Il barbiere di Siviglia, Marchesa Melibea in Il viaggio a Reims, Sonyetka in Lady Macbeth of the Mtsensk District and Siébel in Faust.

Other guest engagements followed her international debut in Pesaro, such as Angelina in La Cenerentola with Theater Basel in 2017, and Rosina in Il barbiere di Siviglia in 2018 with both the Mikhailovsky Theatre, and the Novosibirsk State Opera and Ballet Theatre. The same year, Berzhanskaya returned to the Salzburg Festival for Tchaikovsky's The Queen of Spades, with Mariss Jansons conducting. In 2019, Berzhanskaya performed Vagaus in Vivaldi's Juditha triumphans at the De Nationale Opera, and Aristea in Vivaldi's L'Olimpiade at the Het Concertgebouw, both with Andrea Marcon conducting. She made her house debut with the Teatro dell'Opera di Roma as Angelina in La Cenerentola, returned to the Salzburg Festival as Diane in Orphée aux enfers in a new production by Barrie Kosky, with Enrique Mazzola conducting the Vienna Philharmonic, and also returned to Theater Basel to sing Rosina in Il barbiere di Siviglia in Kirill Serebrennikov's production, with David Parry conducting the Sinfonieorchester Basel.

Engagements in 2020 included Romeo in Bellini's I Capuleti e i Montecchi in a new production for the Teatro dell'Opera di Roma, Isabella in L'italiana in Algeri with the Arena di Verona, Sara in Donizetti's Roberto Devereux with the Teatro Massimo di Palermo, Dido in Dido and Aeneas with the Novosibirsk State Academic Opera and Ballet Theatre, and Rosina in Il barbiere di Siviglia with several theatres, including the Maggio Musicale Fiorentino, the Teatro dell'Opera di Roma, the Mikhailovsky Theatre and the Novosibirsk State Academic Opera and Ballet Theatre.

== Repertoire ==
- Bellini: I Capuleti e i Montecchi – Romeo
- Donizetti: Roberto Devereux – Sara
- Gounod: Faust – Siébel
- Mozart: Così fan tutte – Despina, Dorabella
- Offenbach: Orphée aux enfers – Diane
- Purcell: Dido and Aeneas – Dido
- Rossini:
  - Il barbiere di Siviglia – Rosina
  - La Cenerentola – Angelina
  - L'italiana in Algeri – Isabella
  - Il viaggio a Reims – La Marchesa Melibea
  - Moïse et Pharaon – Sinaïde
- Tchaikovsky: Yevgeny Onegin – Olga
- Verdi: Nabucco – Fenena
- Vivaldi: L'Olimpiade – Aristea

== Awards ==
- 2020/21 Best Young Singer, International Opera Awards
