= Lorenzo Quaglio =

German stage designer

Lorenzo Quaglio (25 May 1730 – 7 May 1804) was a German stage designer of Italian extraction. He worked mainly in Mannheim and in Munich, where he designed the first production of Mozart's opera Idomeneo.
