= David Starobin =

American classical guitarist (born 1951)

- Born: New York City
- Genres: Classical
- Occupations: Guitarist, record producer, composer, writer, filmmaker
- Instrument: Guitar

David Starobin is a composer and guitarist.

Starobin was born in New York City. He records for Bridge Records.
