= Opéra national de Montpellier =

Opera company in Montpellier, France

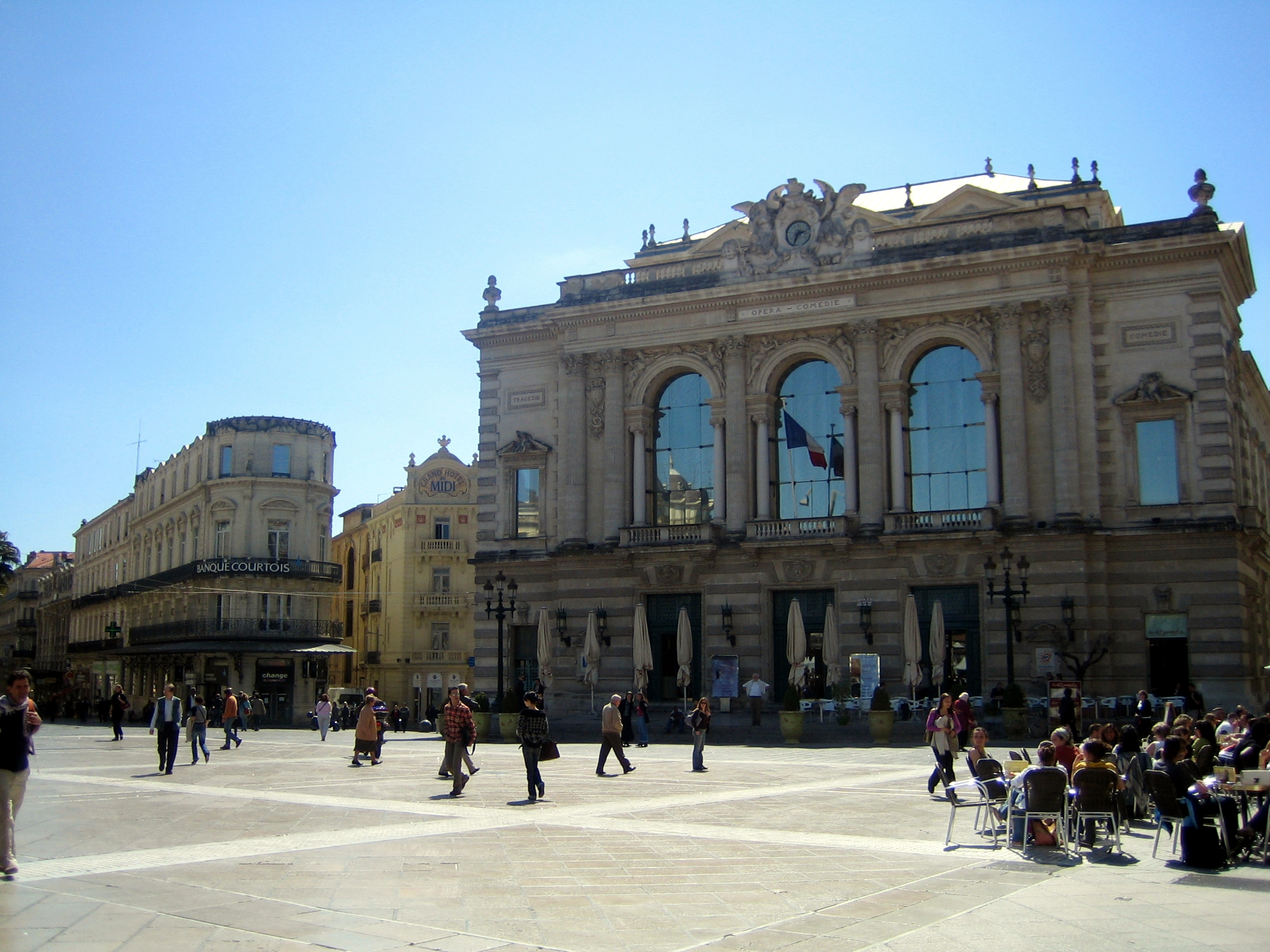
L'opéra Comédie à Montpellier

The Opéra national de Montpellier Languedoc-Roussillon (Occitan: Òpera Nacional de Montpelhièr Languedoc-Rosselhon) is an opera company located in the Place de la Comédie in Montpellier, France.

The company was established in 1755 and was granted the status of "National Opera" in 2002 by the French Ministry of Culture.

The company uses two main buildings for its performances. The Opéra Comédie, built in the Italian style and opened in 1888, houses a 1,200-seat main auditorium and the 350-seat Salle Molière concert hall. The interior of the Italian-style opera house, built from 1884 to 1888 by Cassien Bernard, a pupil of Charles Garnier, has been noted by critics. It has been listed as a historic monument since September 2020.

Since 1990, the company has also performed at the 2,000-seat Opéra Berlioz in the Le Corum arts complex. The new opera house was inaugurated with the same work which had opened its predecessor 102 years before, Les Huguenots, complete, with Gregory Kunde and Nelly Miricioiu conducted by Cyril Diederich. An opening night reviewer described the house "with pink granite walls, movable wooden ceiling and wooden orchestra-pit" as "attractive and functional", and acoustics which allowed all instruments to be heard and good projection for the voices.

The orchestra of the opera is the Orchestre national de Montpellier Languedoc-Roussillon.
