= Legacy of Ivan Mazepa =

Ukrainian historical figure

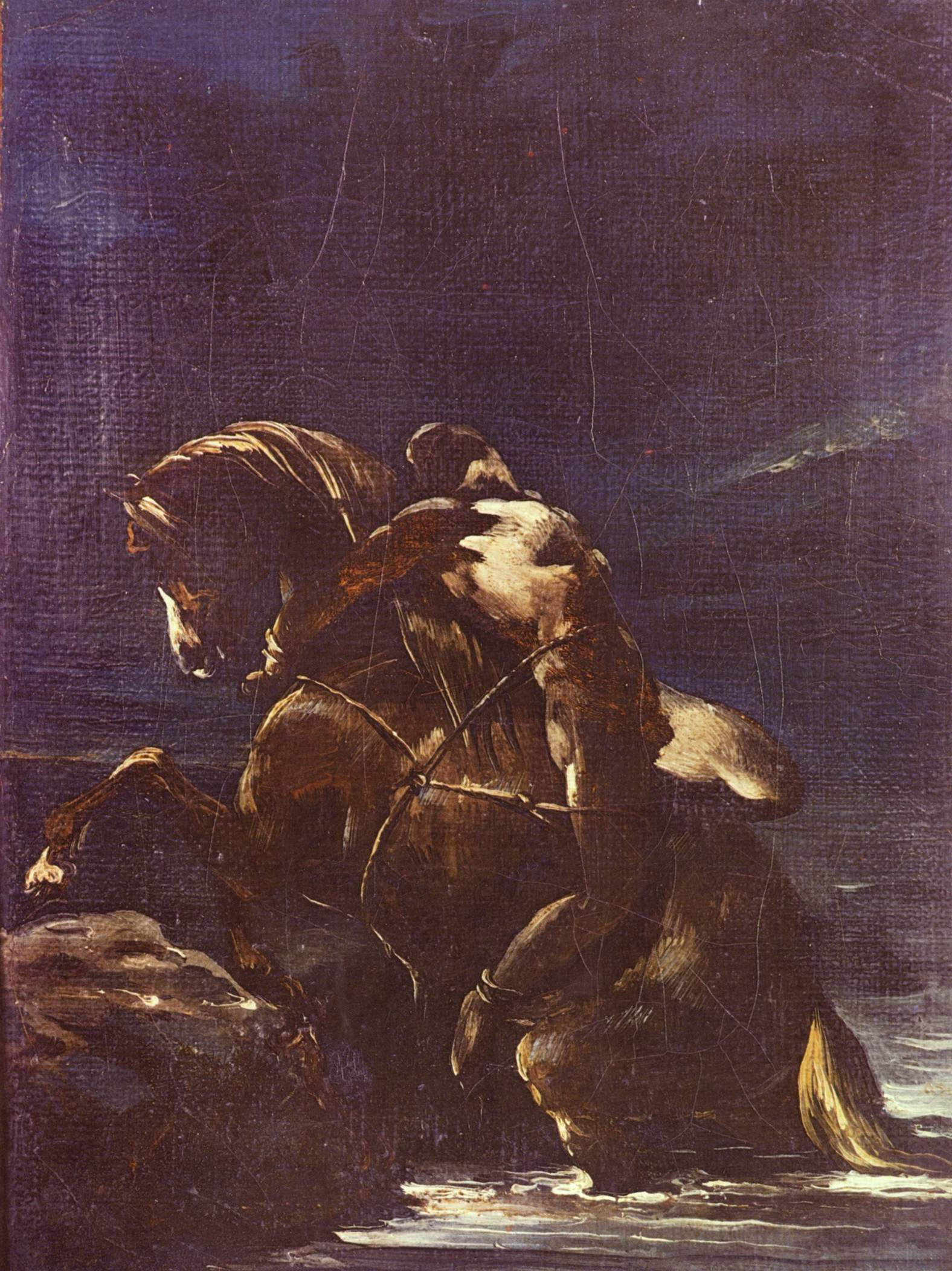
Mazeppa by Théodore Géricault ca. 1823; based on Byron's poem.

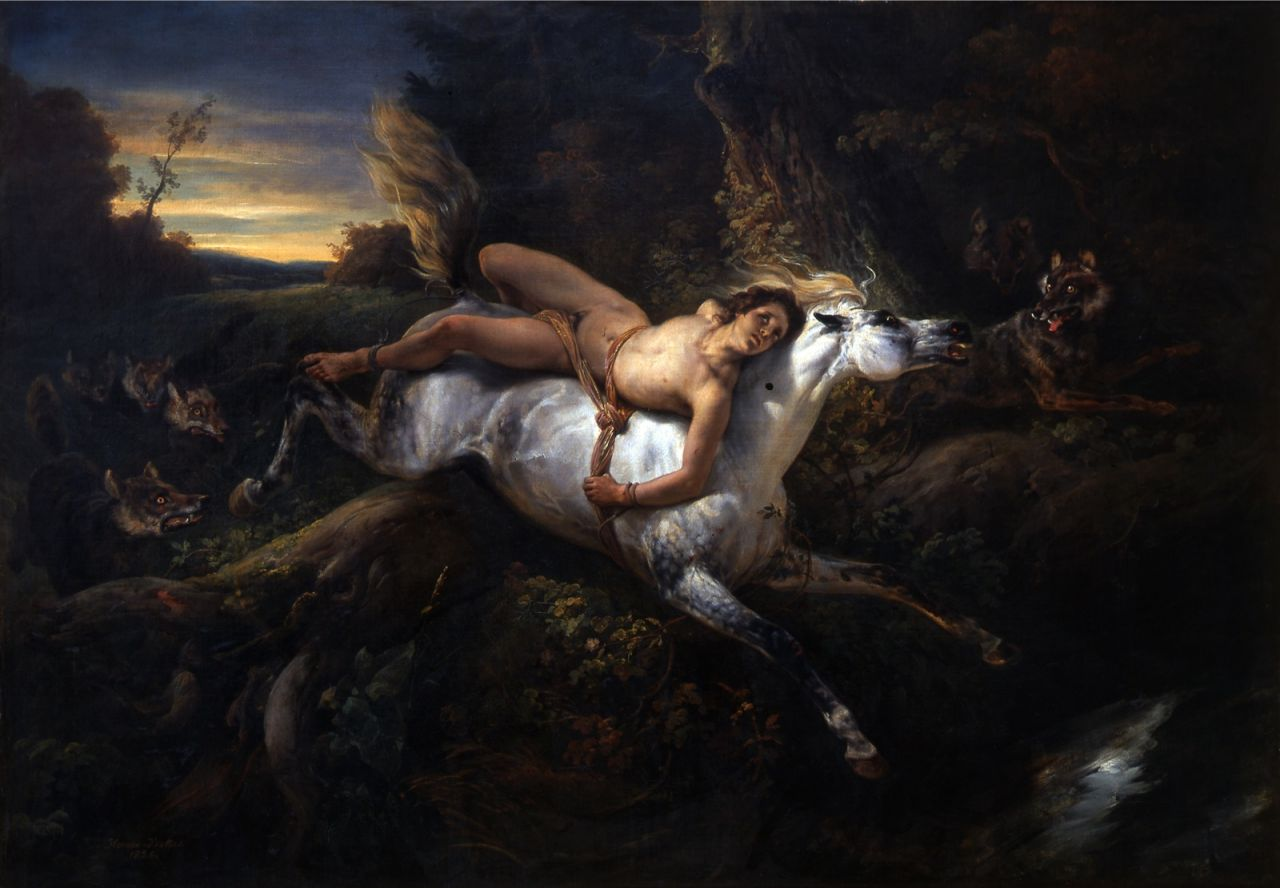
Mazeppa and the Wolves by Horace Vernet, 1826.

- The spelling "Mazepa" refers to the historical person; the double-p "Mazeppa" is used for the artistic and literary works.

Ivan Mazepa (1639–1709) was a significant figure in the history of Ukraine. One story about him says that as a young man, he was caught in flagrante with a noblewoman, whose husband punished him by tying him naked to a wild horse and setting them free; eventually he reached the Cossacks and became their military leader. This legend caught the attention of the English poet Lord Byron ("mad, bad, and dangerous to know"), whose Mazeppa (1819) brought the events to wider attention. His narrative poem inspired many paintings, particularly by French Romantics, which in turn stimulated musical compositions, stage plays, more poems, and so on. New life was breathed into the equestrian tale when it was transposed to the American Wild West. With the independence of Ukraine in 1991, the figure of Mazepa is once again on the international stage.

== The historical figure ==
Mazepa served as Hetman of Zaporizhian Host (head of state of a Cossack military territory) in 1687–1708. He played an important role in the Battle of Poltava (1709), where – after learning that the Russian Tsar, Peter the Great, intended to replace him with Alexander Menshikov – he led his army and sided with King Charles XII of Sweden. The political consequences and interpretation of this switch of allegiance have resonated in the national histories both of Russia and of Ukraine. The alienation of Mazepa from Ukrainian historiography continued during the Soviet period, but post-1991 in independent Ukraine there have been strong moves to rehabilitate Mazepa's image, although he remains a controversial figure.

== Byron's poem ==
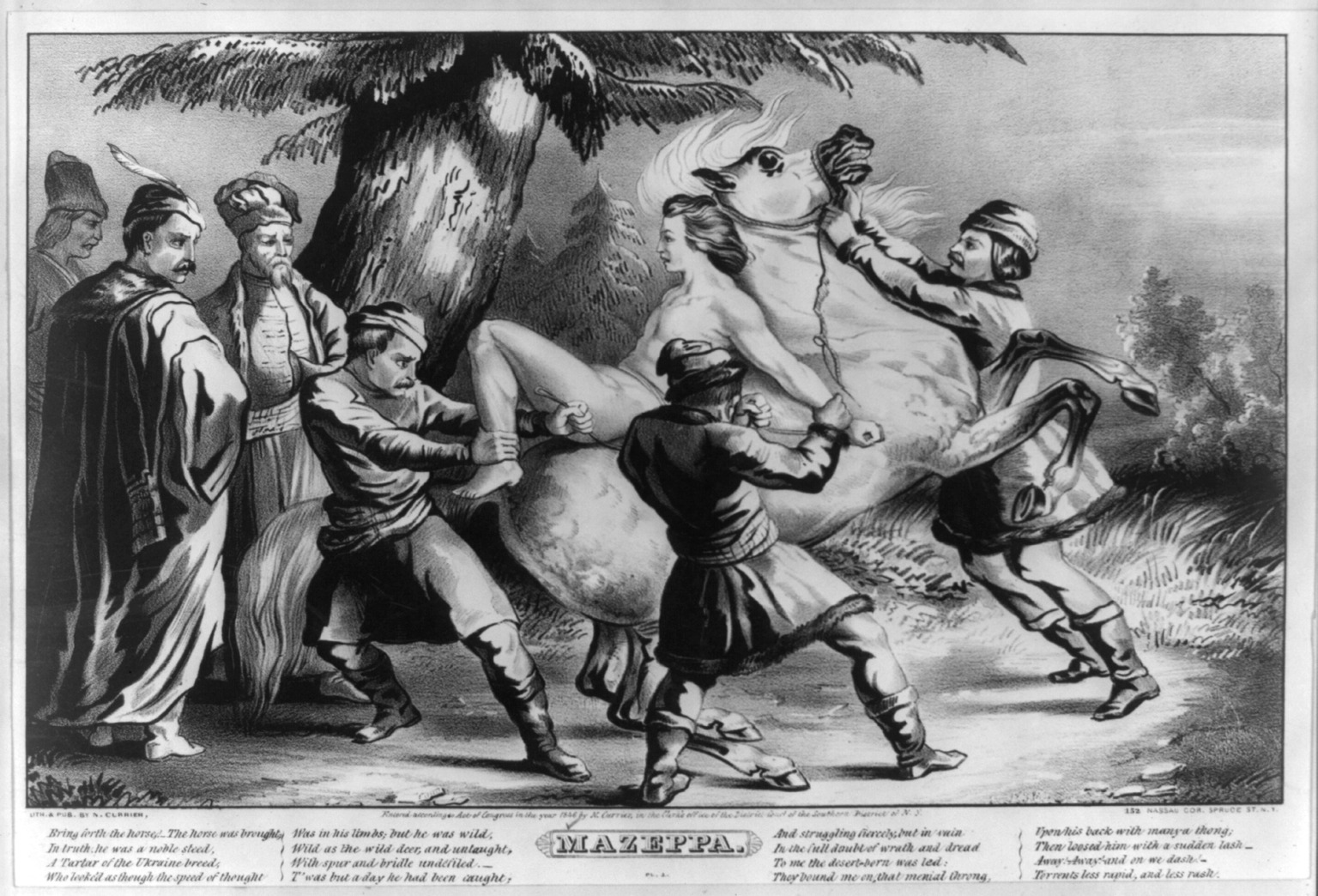
Currier and Ives illustration to their 1846 printing of the poem

Lord Byron published his narrative poem in 1819. According to the poem, the young Mazeppa is serving as a page at the Court of King John II Casimir Vasa when he has a love affair with the Polish Countess Theresa, married to a much older count. On discovering the affair, the count punishes Mazeppa by tying him naked to a wild horse and setting the horse loose. The bulk of the poem describes this traumatic journey. The poem has been praised for its "vigor of style and its sharp realization of the feelings of suffering and endurance".

There is no historical evidence to support that Mazepa was exiled from Poland because of a love affair, nor that he was punished by being strapped to a wild horse. However, this colorful legend was in circulation before Byron published his poem. Voltaire repeats it in History of Charles XII, King of Sweden (1731). This appears to have been Byron's main source for his poem: his 'Advertisement' to the poem includes three long quotations from this work. Several critics have also speculated that Byron was familiar with the Mémoires d'Azéma (1764) by the French writer André-Guillaume Contant d'Orville, as there are significant similarities between the plot of that novel and of Byron's poem.

== The first wave of reaction ==
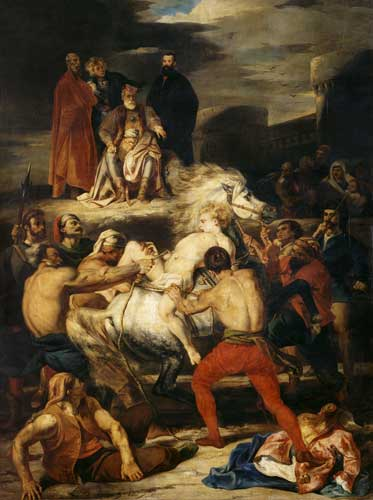
Louis Boulanger, Mazeppa

Byron's poem was both popular and influential in the Romantic period. Horses in art had long been a popular theme, so when the poem was translated into French the same year by Amédée Pichot, a wave of French painters decided to depict Mazeppa's "wild ride", including Théodore Géricault (1823, now held in the Metropolitan Museum of Art), Eugène Delacroix (1824, Finnish National Gallery), Horace Vernet (1826, Musée Calvet in Avignon), and Louis Boulanger (1827, the Musée des Beaux-Arts de Rouen). Boulanger's The Ordeal of Mazeppa and Vernet's Mazeppa and the Wolves both competed in the Salon of 1827. This last was adapted by John Doyle as a satirical print in the Reform Crisis of 1832, with King William IV tied to a horse labelled "Reform", and about to leap over the "Revolutionary Torrent", while the wolves have the faces of the Duke of Wellington and other politicians.

Depictions in art continued for at least fifty years; the usual moments shown were the hero being mounted on the horse, his nighttime ride, with or without pursuing wolves, and the eventual collapse of the horse. The next scene of a herd of wild horses surrounding him and his dead mount is sometimes shown, mostly after another Vernet painting.

A theatrical version of the story soon appeared: a show called Mazeppa, or the Tartar Horse premiered at Antonio Franconi's Cirque Olympique in Paris in 1825. This was copied in both the USA and England. Aleksandr Pushkin wrote a poem-response to Byron entitled Poltava (1828–29), which opens with an epigraph from the Englishman's poem, and in which he portrays Mazeppa as a villain who betrayed Russians.

Victor Hugo was inspired by the French Romantic paintings to compose "Mazeppa", one of the major pieces in Les Orientales (1829), which he dedicated to Boulanger. The first part of his poem describes Mazeppa's run across Ukrainian plains. The second part compares Mazeppa to a poet banned from the living world because of his eccentricities, the banned poet is attached to the wild horse of his inspiration. The comparison to the poet ends by saying that this crazy trip through suffering finally gives success and glory to the poet.

== The 1830s-1860s ==
The playwright Henry M. Milner wrote the hippodrama Mazeppa; or, The wild horse of Tartary. A romantic drama, in three acts. Dramatised from Lord Byron's poem by H.M. Milner, and adapted to the stage under the direction of Mr. Ducrow. (This was Andrew Ducrow, the "Father of British circus equestrianism" and proprietor of Astley's Amphitheatre.) It appeared in London in 1831. Over the next several years it toured the US, until "at one point, five different productions of the play were showing in San Francisco".

John Frederick Herring Sr., an Englishman who had started out as a stagecoach driver, painted several versions of the story: two are "after Horace Vernet" (circa 1833, Tate and in 1842 "MAZEPPA". In 1846, the American lithographer Nathaniel Currier, of Currier and Ives, prepared four plates, with Byronic quotations; the artworks are now at Bridgeman Art Library.

Juliusz Słowacki, a major figure in the Polish Romantic period, wrote a play entitled Mazeppa (1840). Although he is now considered the father of modern Polish drama, it was the only one of his dramas that was put on stage during his lifetime. James Malcolm Rymer, a British writer of penny dreadfuls, wrote Mazeppa; or, The Wild Horse of the Ukraine: A Romance (1850).

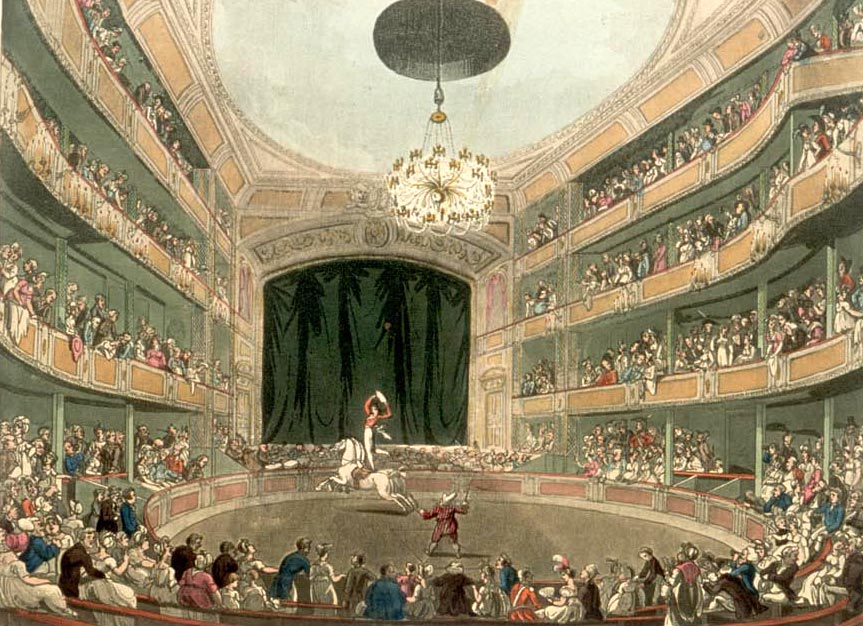
A similar equestrian show at Astley's Amphitheatre in London

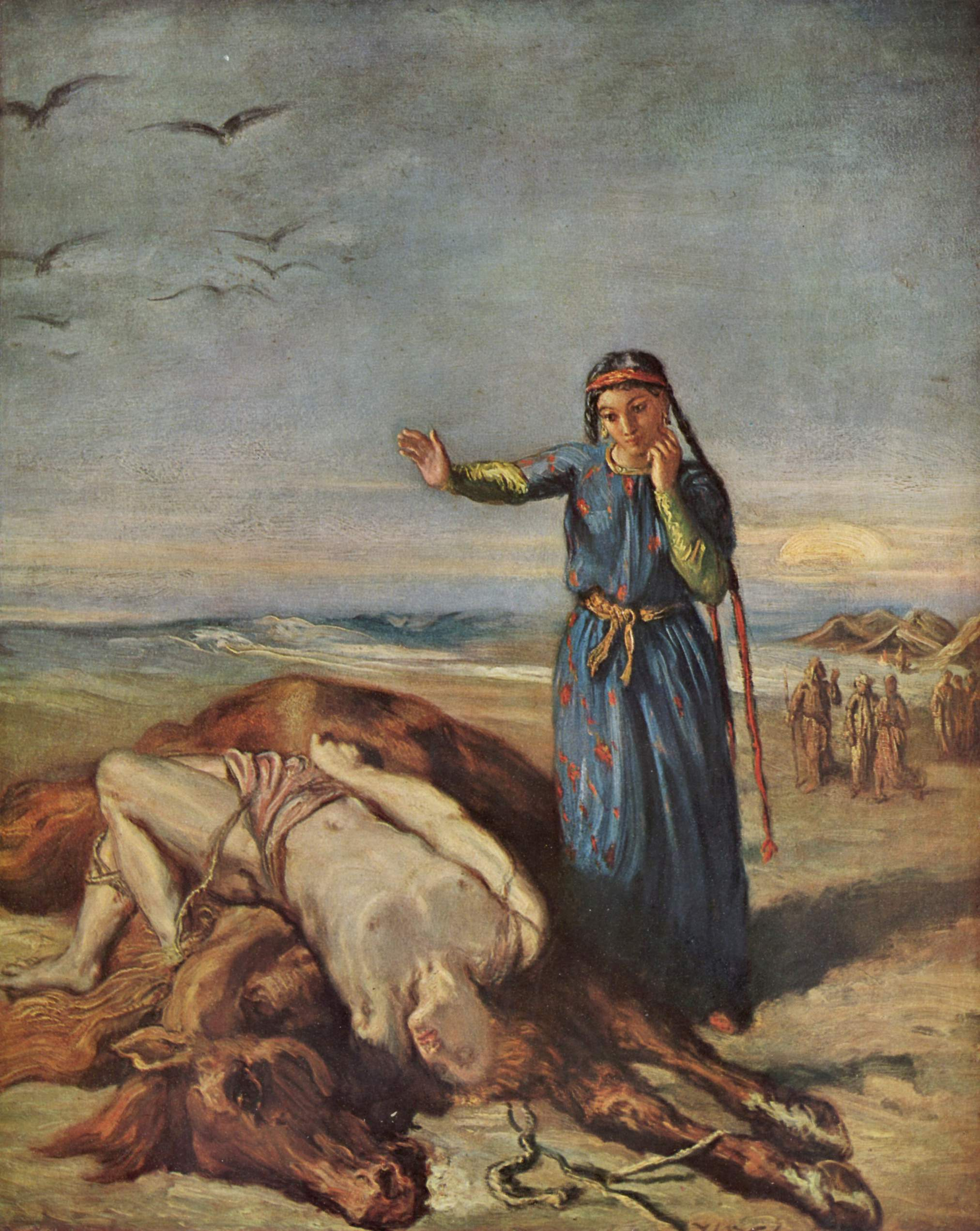
Théodore Chassériau, Cossack girl at Mazeppa's body

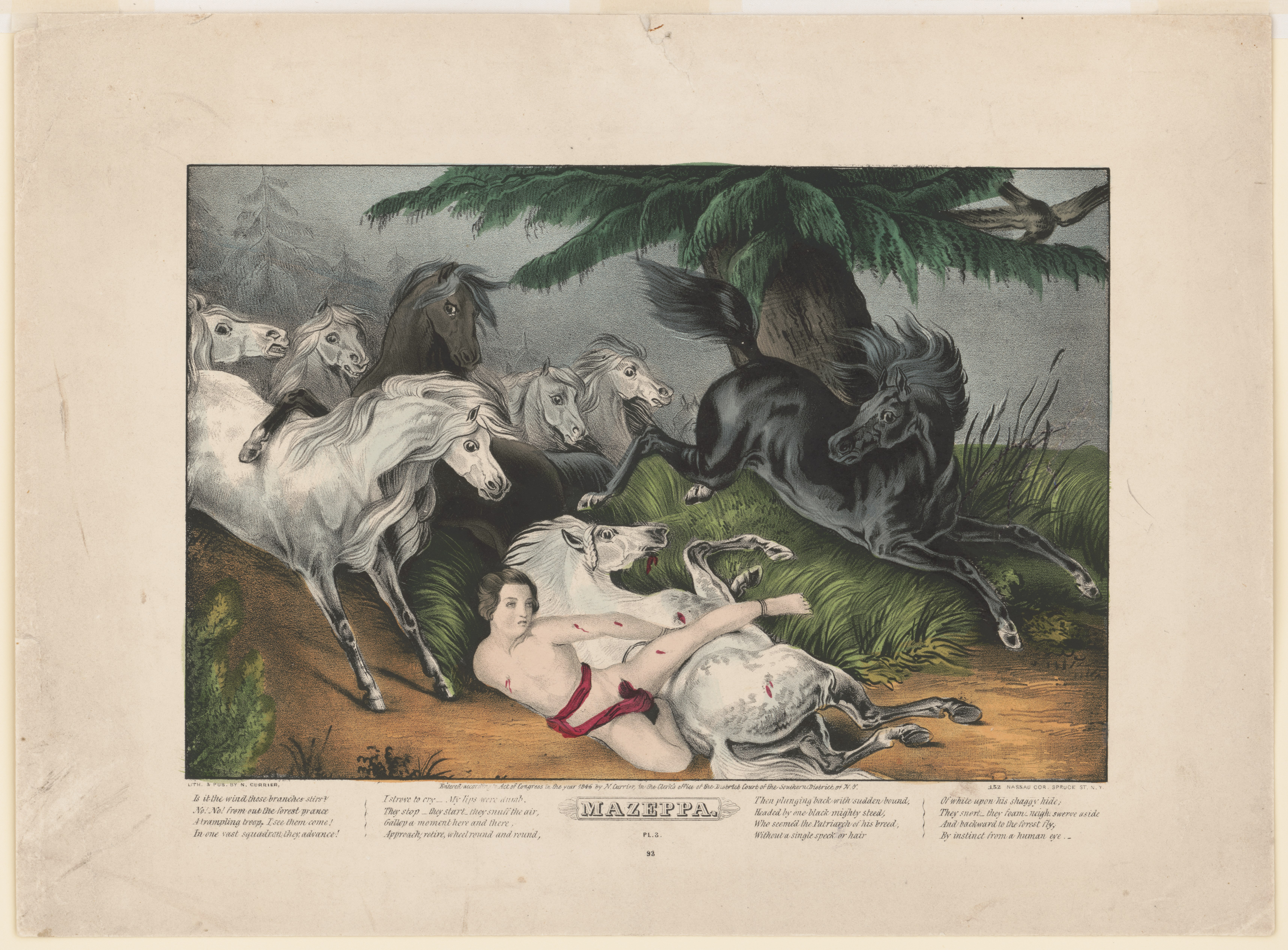
Mazeppa, handcolored lithograph by Nathaniel Currier

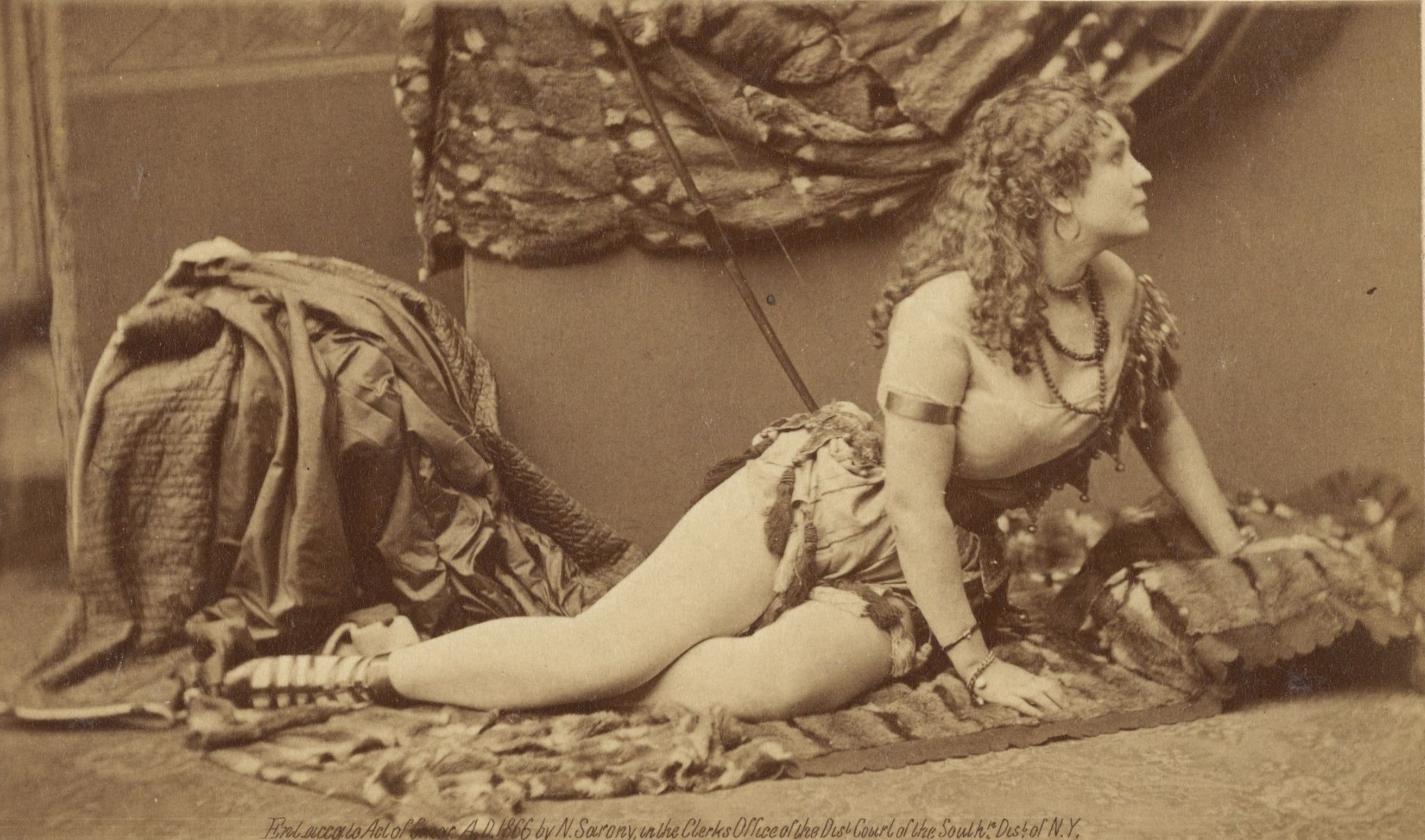
Adah Isaacs Menken clad in a bodystocking as Mazeppa

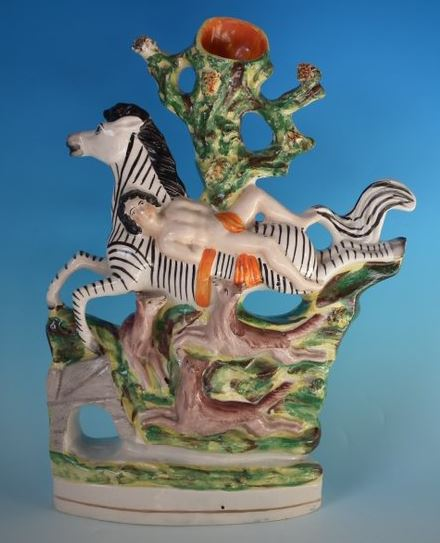
Staffordshire figure group and spill vase, circa 1860, where the artist has depicted a zebra, and wolves.

Musicians were also inspired. Carl Loewe composed a tone-poem. A generation after Hugo published his poem, it became the literary inspiration for a symphonic poem (1851) and a Transcendental Étude (1852) by Franz Liszt. Another French Romantic painter, Théodore Chassériau, re-interpreted Byron's poem, with Cossack girl at Mazeppa 's body (1851, Musée des Beaux-Arts de Strasbourg). Eugène Charpentier had already painted La Délivrance de Mazeppa (c. 1840). The Irishman Michael William Balfe composed a cantata known as The Page or Mazeppa in 1861. The subject reached the very popular medium of Staffordshire figures, where the fancy of the painters sometimes showed him tied to a zebra.

Milner's hippodrama was adapted and burlesqued over the decades. For example, in 1856 it was re-written as an equestrian burlesque in two acts, by blackface minstrel entertainer Charles "Charlie" White. The main antagonist is Castiron, and his daughter is Olinska. The Mazeppa story became "a well-worn melodrama in dire need of revitalization", which it received from the performer Adah Isaacs Menken. Other women had played Mazeppa (see Breeches role), including Charlotte Cushman, but Menken's interpretation -- "sexing up" the part, scandalously performing the nude scene clad only in a flesh-colored bodystocking—really caught the public imagination. Many other female Mazeppas followed, as did a new wave of burlesques. Mazeppa was very popular during the American Civil War and became the most widely performed drama in the American west from the 1860s until the turn of the century, and was also popular in London.

Agnes Thatcher Lake, a circus performer and equestrian all her life, took a production of Mazeppa to Europe in 1865, performing before Prince Karl of Prussia. She then took her production across the United States, the only circus to do so, performing under her company's big top tents in towns and cities without a theatre big enough to host a stage show. A 2009 biography of Lake (who later married Wild Bill Hickok) estimates that two million Americans saw her athletic interpretation of Mazeppa, many more than saw Menken's sexualised one.

In 1855, the town of Mazeppa, Minnesota, was named by way of Byron's poem.

== Late 19th–early 20th century ==
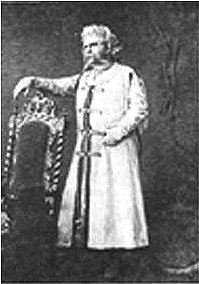
Bogomir Korsov as Mazeppa, Bolshoi Theatre, Moscow, 1884

In 1877, Albert Aiken wrote a dime novel called The Indian Mazeppa or The Madman of the Plains, in which the myth is transposed to the Wild West.

Pushkin's poem became the subject of an opera entitled Mazeppa, written between 1881 and 1883, with three acts and six scenes. The music is by Tchaikovsky and the libretto by Victor Burenin. It is set in Ukraine in the 18th century, and is a story about love, abduction, political persecution and vengeful murder.

In 1910, Francis Boggs produced a short film based on the stage play of Byron's poem titled Mazeppa or the Wild horse of Tartary.

Mazepa also lent his name to the Mazepynka, a military hat used by the Ukrainian Sich Riflemen that was later adopted by the Ukrainian Galician Army, Carpathian Sich, Ukrainian Insurgent Army, and, most recently, the Armed Forces of Ukraine.

== Since 1990 ==
In 1991, Ukraine declared independence, and Mazeppa rose again in international consciousness. A French drama film titled Mazeppa, based loosely on the lives of the painter Géricault and the equestrian Franconi, won a prize at the 1993 Cannes Film Festival. Gericault decided to stay and live with the circus and painted only horses to try and understand the mystery of this animal; Mazeppa embodies a man carried away by his passion.

A Ukrainian film by Yuri Ilyenko loosely based on historical facts, called A Prayer for Hetman Mazepa was released in 2002.

A South African interpretation of the Mazepa-Mazeppa motif describes it as "Romantic Phaethon" (a character in Greek mythology who drove the sun-chariot too recklessly) and points to its appeal to Modernist poets such as Bertolt Brecht and Roy Campbell.
