= All-Russia Exhibition 1882 =

National exhibition held in Moscow in 1882

All-Russia Artistic and Industrial Exhibition
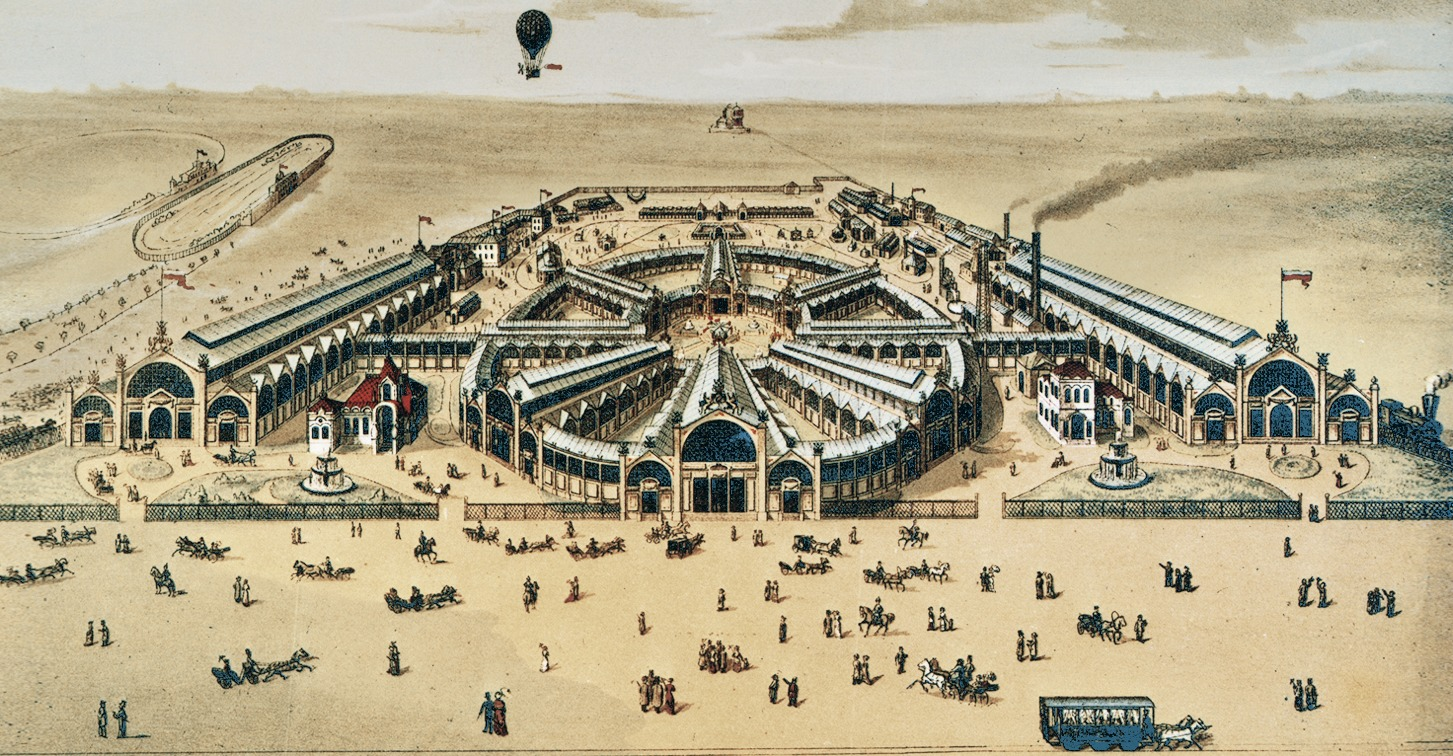
- national exhibition held in Moscow in 1882
- Country: Russian Empire

The XV All-Russia Artistic and Industrial Exhibition of 1882 was a national exhibition held in Moscow in 1882. The event drew more than one million visitors and included notable cultural highlights, including the premiere of Tchaikovsky’s Solemn Overture. Widely praised as a triumph of Russian industry, the exhibition marked a significant milestone in the nation’s technological and artistic development.

== Description ==
The exhibition was initially scheduled to be opened in 1875 in Moscow (the previous exhibition was held in 1870 in Saint Petersburg), but it was postponed to 1880 due to Russia's participation in the world exhibitions in Philadelphia (1876) and Paris (1878). However, preparations were not completed by 1880, and the opening was delayed further. The regicide of Tsar Alexander II, in March 1881, caused an additional postponement to 1882.

The total area of the exhibition was 11 times larger than that of the 1870 exhibition: the displays were housed in separate pavilions across 30 hectares on Khodynka Field.

The main attraction was the central exhibition building, consisting of eight three-nave pavilions arranged in a star-shaped pattern, connected by two concentric galleries, forming a large central courtyard and eight smaller courtyards (diameter 298 m, area 35,000 m²). Flanking the main building were two nearly identical pavilions: one housed the machinery department (9,600 m²), and the other contained the art and educational departments (9,980 m²). All three buildings were constructed using standardized three-span metal frames, over 31 m wide, with the taller middle spans featuring overhead lighting. The metal framework for the main building was produced at the Saint Petersburg Metal Factory, while the pavilions for the machinery and art departments were made at the Bromley Factory in Moscow and the Bryansk Factory. The general layout of the pavilions and facade designs were developed with contributions from A. I. Rezanov, G. E. Pauker, and I. A. Vyshnegradsky.

The final project and working drawings were completed by architects A. E. Weber and A. S. Kaminsky, who oversaw the construction of all main pavilions. Additionally, the exhibition committee built nine main ("state") pavilions, including a gardening pavilion, an additional pavilion for the handicraft department, and two pavilions for animal exhibitions. Among the notable structures was the Imperial Pavilion, designed in the Russian style for the "rest of high-ranking persons" and closed to the public; similar structures would appear at many subsequent exhibitions. The exhibition also featured 36 private pavilions, designed by prominent Russian architects. Particularly notable for their ornate design were the pavilions of P. F. Lanin's artificial water enterprise, the porcelain factory owner M. S. Kuznetsov, and the prominent sugar manufacturer Abrikosov. The vodka manufacturer and purveyor to the Imperial Court, Shtriter, constructed a stand in the form of triumphal arches made from bottles of his products. The display by the Moscow perfume factory Brocard & Co —a cologne fountain— was a great success, earning the company a gold medal. The main highlight of the Zlatoust Arms Factory's stand was a massive Russian state emblem: "...A colossal heraldic eagle made of knives, forks, blades, cockades, and other metal military adornments, with a vase behind it, also made from various military weapon blades". The factory received two awards: a gold medal for the high quality and finish of edged weapons, cutlery, and tools, and a silver medal for using martensitic steel in rifle barrel production and introducing metal baths for blade tempering. Other pavilions were built by the Svetoza gas lighting factory, the mill of the "S. A. Dobrov and B. I. Nabgolts" partnership, and bell foundries near the gardening department, including the Olovanischnikov Sons firm from Yaroslavl, Ryzhov from Kharkov Governorate, and two from Moscow, Finlyandsky and Samgin. Other exhibitors included the Felzer brewery and distillery, the Warsaw Industrial Society of Mechanical and Mining Factories, and the Warsaw Steel Foundry.

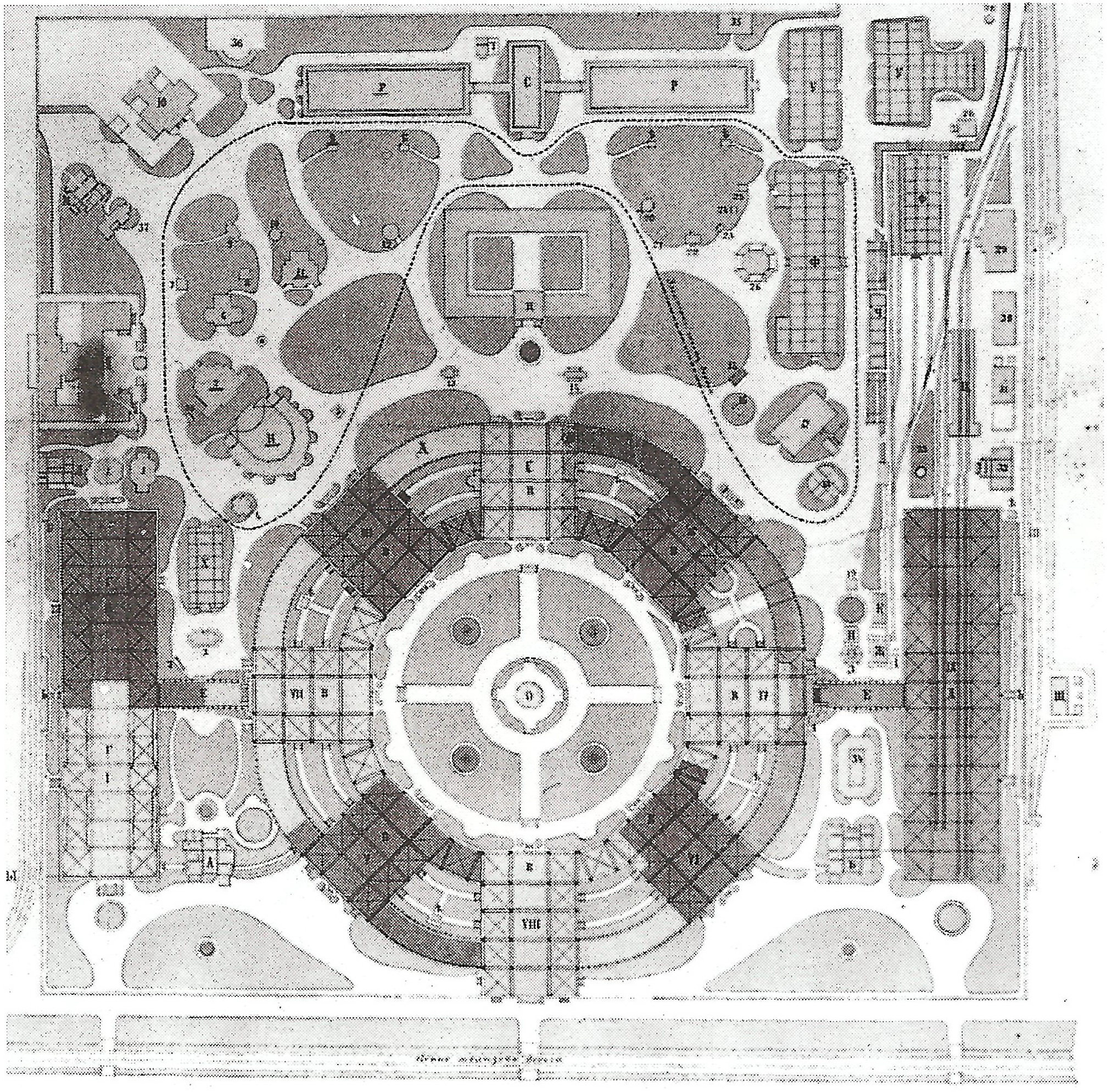
Plan of the 1882 exhibition in Moscow

For the first time, an electric railway was introduced at the exhibition, built by the renowned Saint Petersburg firm Siemens & Halske. The 300-meter line was highly popular, with a mini electric passenger train transporting up to 800 passengers daily.

For visitor convenience, a concert hall with 2,150 seats, a restaurant, a tavern, an administration and expert pavilion, a fire station, and other auxiliary buildings were constructed, most of which featured distinctive architecture.

The official opening and consecration took place on May 20, 1882. The exhibition opened to the public the following day and operated daily, except for three days reserved for high-ranking visitors. Over its four-month duration, the exhibition attracted over one million visitors. In 131 days, it welcomed 1,077,320 visitors, including 970,107 paying visitors who generated 256,765 rubles and 5 kopecks in revenue, and 107,198 free visitors (students, factory workers, and lower military ranks).

Among the most visited attractions, dubbed "Russian products" by experts, were Lopashov's restaurant and tavern. The restaurant, designed by architect D. I. Chichagov, was built starting in 1880 at a cost of approximately 205,000 silver rubles and completed by the exhibition's opening. It employed 140 waiters on regular days, up to 200 on holidays, and up to 70 cooks and assistants, totaling 320 staff members. The tavern was intended to serve the "needs of the middle and less affluent classes". Reviewers complained about the high prices, which "caused widespread indignation," but acknowledged that the restaurant "was far from able to accommodate all those willing to pay for expensive dishes and drinks".

For the first time, the exhibition rules included a general plan indicating the thematic division of the exposition. The total number of participants reached 5,813. The unique exposition, comprising 6,852 lots of items, was divided into 14 departments and 121 groups. For the first time, a separate handicraft department (1,105 items) was established, formed by four provincial zemstvos and seven statistical committees, making it the second largest after the agriculture department. The scientific-educational and military departments also debuted. The machinery department's diverse exhibits showcased significant advancements in domestic industrial technology.

The exhibition became a venue for the synthetic interaction of arts — architecture, sculpture, painting, garden landscaping, music, theater, and ballet. The newly established art department, featuring around 950 works, was a significant event in Russia's artistic life. It showcased works by renowned Russian artists such as Antokolsky, Bryullov, Vasnetsov, Vereshchagin, Ge, Ivanov, Kramskoy, Kuindzhi, Repin, Polenov, Pryanishnikov, Savitsky, and others. A series of concerts was performed by a symphony orchestra conducted by A. G. Rubinstein.

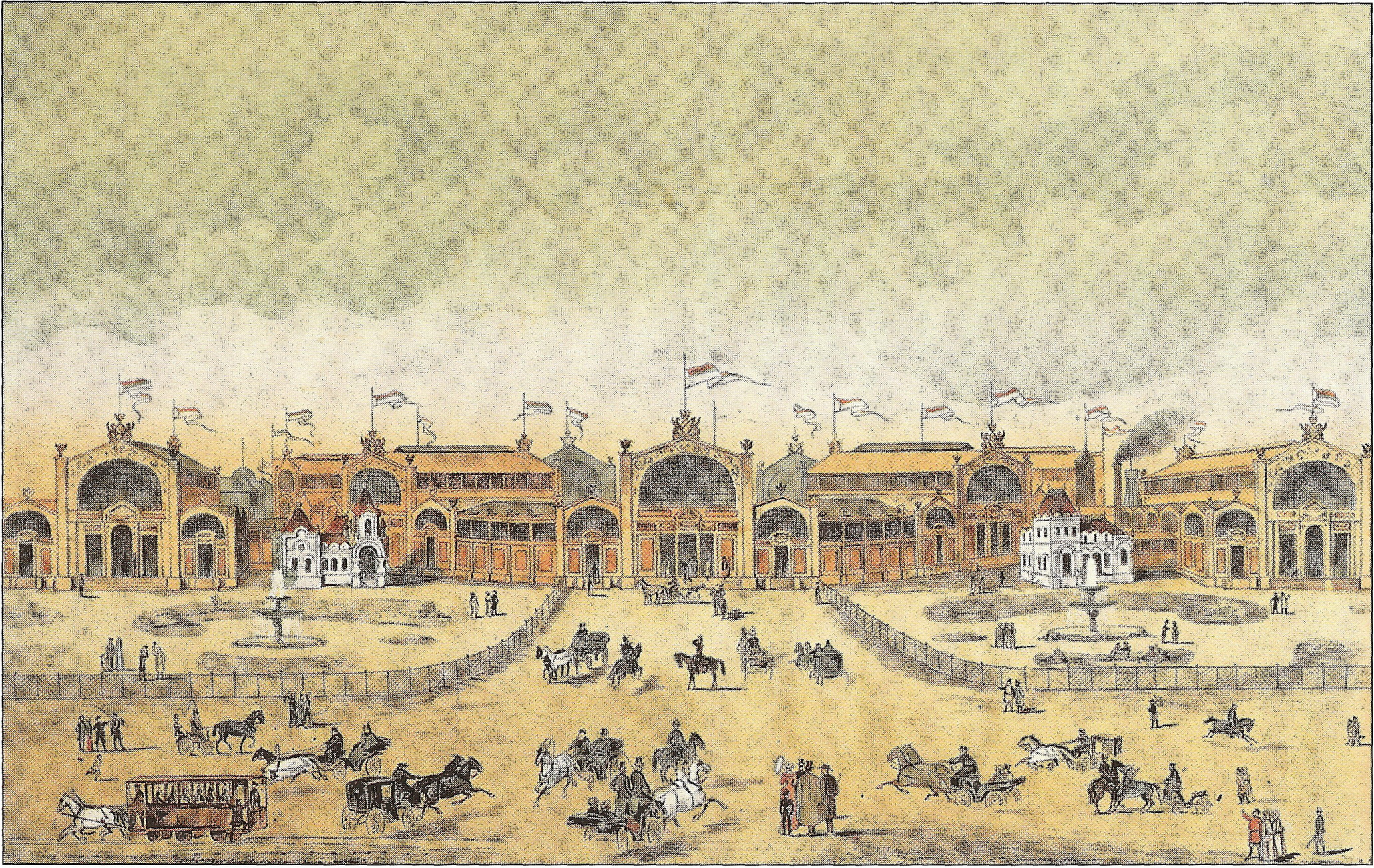
Exhibition of 1882 in Moscow

In a letter to N. von Meck, Pyotr Ilyich Tchaikovsky wrote: "For me, there is nothing more distasteful than composing for some celebration. Think, my dear friend! What, for example, can one write for the opening of an exhibition, except banalities and noisy platitudes? Yet I lack the courage to refuse the request, and I will have to undertake this unpleasant task." By early November 1880, the "Solemn Overture" was completed and published. Its first performance took place on August 8, 1882, during the exhibition's events, in a symphony concert by the Moscow branch of the Russian Musical Society under the direction of I. K. Al'tani.

The Paris-based Revue des Deux Mondes noted in a detailed report from Moscow: "The 1882 exhibition is a true triumph for industrial Russia; it reflects immense progress in all areas of human labor over the past twenty years".

The exhibition cost the treasury 2,945,726 rubles.

== Bibliography ==
- All-Russia Artistic and Industrial Exhibition in Moscow 1882 / Edited by G. D. Hoppe. Saint-Petersburg: Eduard Hoppe Typography, 1882. 252 p.
- Balagurov, N. V. "Александр III и художественный отдел Всероссийской выставки 1882 года в Москве: на пути к музею национального искусства" [Alexander III and the Art Section at the All-Russia Exhibition in Moscow in 1882: Towards the National Art Museum].
