= Mazeppa (opera) =

Russian opera by Tchaikovsky

- Opera by Tchaikovsky
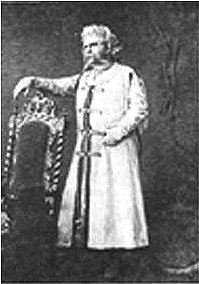
- Bogomir Korsov in the title role in the premiere
- Native title: Russian: Мазепа
- Librettist: Victor Burenin
- Language: Russian
- Based on: "Poltava" by Pushkin
- Premiere: 15 February 1884; Bolshoi Theatre, Moscow

Mazeppa, properly Mazepa (Russian: Мазепа), is an opera in three acts (six scenes) by Pyotr Ilyich Tchaikovsky. The libretto was written by Victor Burenin and is based on Pushkin's poem Poltava, part of the cultural legacy of Mazeppa.

Mazeppa is a blood-thirsty tale of crazy love, abduction, political persecution, execution, and vengeful murder. The action takes place in Ukraine at the beginning of the 18th century. The protagonists are the historical figures Ivan Stepanovych Mazeppa (1639–1709), the Hetman of the Ukrainian Cossacks, and Vasyl Leontiyovych Kochubey (c.1640–1708), a very prosperous Ukrainian nobleman and statesman.

== Composition history ==
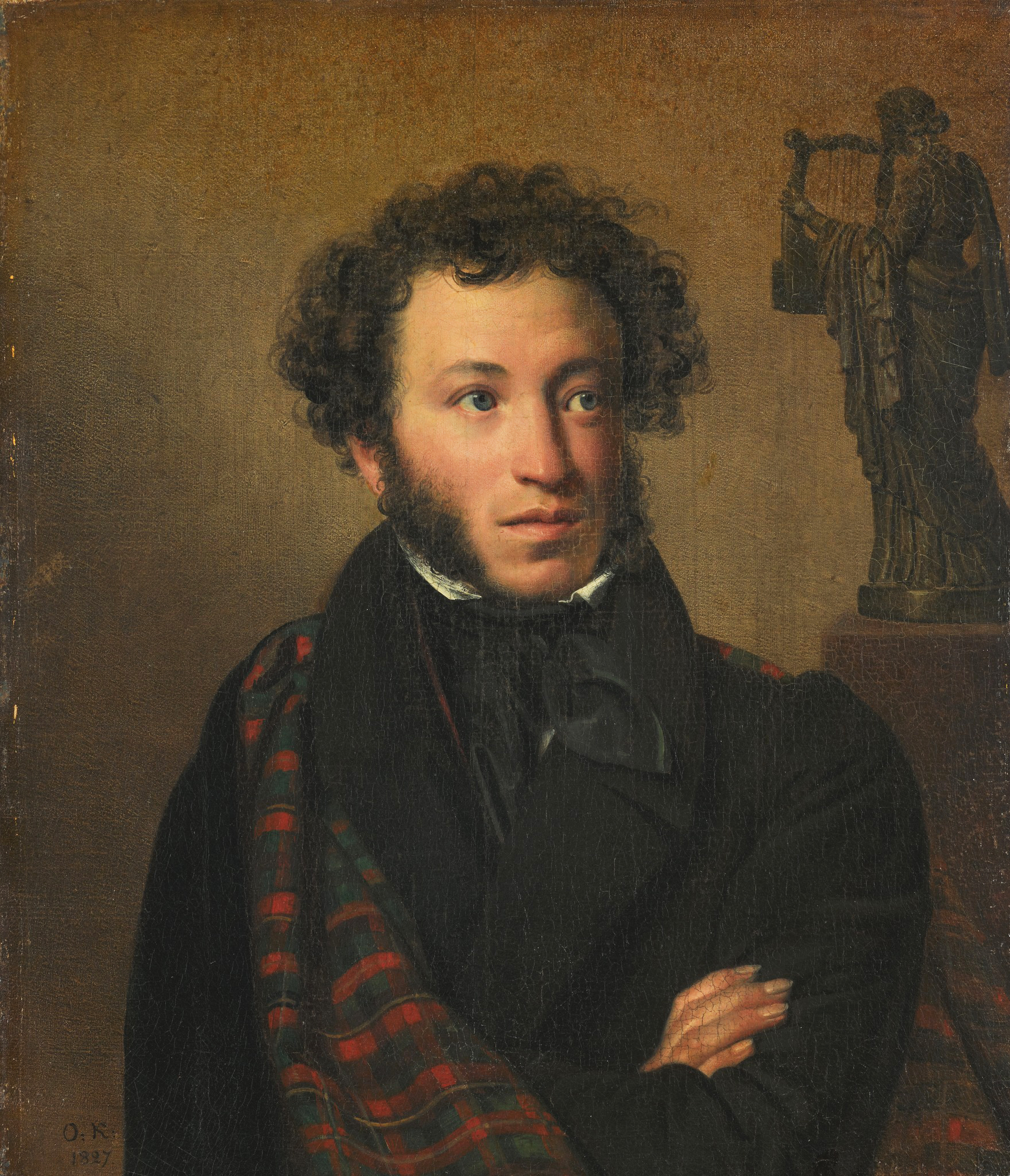
Aleksandr Pushkin (1799–1837)

The opera was composed between June 1881 and April 1883. Mazeppa's libretto was based on Poltava, a narrative poem by Alexander Pushkin. Pushkin based his story on historical events at Poltava, the battle where Tsar Peter the Great defeated Swedish King Charles XII. Pushkin took some creative freedom in order to create powerful characters and grand passions. For example, Kochubey (the wealthy Cossack whose daughter elopes with Mazeppa) actually managed to successfully keep Mariya from him. He turned Mazeppa in to the Tsar four years after Mazeppa asked for her hand.

Tchaikovsky first mentioned the idea of an opera based on Poltava to his publisher in the summer of 1881. Soon, he became obsessed with Poltava's story of tragic love and political betrayal and quickly produced four numbers plus sketching a duet based on material from his symphonic poem Romeo and Juliet (this music later became Mazeppa and Mariya's Act 2 duet). Librettist Burenin followed Pushkin's poem, incorporating large excerpts from Poltava into his libretto, but Tchaikovsky was not very pleased with Burenin's work: he felt "no special enthusiasm for the characters", and went on to make some critical changes of his own, adding more of Pushkin's lines back in. Vasily Kandaurov contributed the text for Mazeppa's aria in Act 2, Scene 2.

The libretto was revised over and over again, even after the opera's premieres. Choosing to focus primarily on the love story at the heart of the opera, the composer added the character Andrei, a lovesick boy whose unrequited love for the beautiful Mariya gives her tragic fate a special poignancy. Mazeppa shares many characteristics with Tchaikovsky's Eugene Onegin, which is also based on a literary work of Alexander Pushkin: they both center on a young woman whose powerful love draws her into a catastrophic downward spiral.

== Performance history ==
The premiere performance took place on 15 February [OS February 3] 1884 at the Bolshoi Theatre in Moscow conducted by Ippolit Al'tani with stage Direction by Anton Bartsal, set design by Matvey Shishkov and Mikhail Bocharov, and Lev Ivanov as Balletmeister.

Four days later, on 19 February [OS February 7], the St. Petersburg premiere followed at the Mariinsky Theatre conducted by Eduard Nápravník.

At both performances, the work was brilliantly staged but marred by the uneven vocal and acting abilities of the cast. But audiences responded warmly and the critical notices, in Moscow at least, were kind. Tchaikovsky's brother, Modest, hid the truth about the critical roasting the opera got in St. Petersburg; when he finally learned the truth, Tchaikovsky wrote to thank him: "You did well, the truth might have killed me."

The American premiere took place on March 6, 2006.

== Roles ==
Role	Voice type	Premiere cast 15 February [OS February 3], 1884 (Conductor: Ippolit Al'tani)
Ivan Mazeppa, hetman	baritone	Bogomir Korsov
Vasily Kochubey	bass	Pavel Borisov
Lyubov, his wife	mezzo-soprano	Aleksandra Krutikova
Mariya, their daughter	soprano	Emiliya Pavlovskaya
Andrei	tenor	Dmitri Usatov
Orlik, henchman	bass	Otto Führer
Iskra, a friend of Kochubey	tenor	P. Grigoriev
A drunken Cossack	tenor	Aleksandr Dodonov
Chorus, silent roles: Cossacks, women, guests, Kochubey's servants, monks, henchmen

== Instrumentation ==
- Strings: Violin I, Violin II, Violas, Cellos, and Double Basses
- Woodwinds: Piccolo, 3 Flutes, 2 Oboes, Cor Anglais, 2 Clarinets (B-flat and A), 2 Bassoons
- Brass: 4 Horns, 2 Trumpets, 3 Trombones, Tuba,
- Percussion: Timpani, Triangle, Tambourine, Side Drum, Cymbals, Bass Drum
- Other: Harp

Source: Tchaikovsky Research

== Synopsis ==
Time: Beginning of the 18th century

Place: Ukraine

Overture: Mazeppa's ride

=== Act I ===
Scene 1: Kochubey's estate on the banks of the Dniepr

A group of peasant girls sail on the river, singing of making garlands of flowers to cast on the river and so divine their husband as a fortune-telling game. Mariya arrives, and they all plead with her to join them, but there is company at her house: The Hetman Mazeppa, and so she cannot stay with them. After they leave, she reveals that games have no temptation for her anymore, for she is in love with Mazeppa. Her childhood friend, Andrei, overhears her, and tries to comfort her, but when she thanks him for his kind friendship, he reveals he always loved her. She wishes it could be different, that she could love him too – but fate will not allow it. Andrei rushes off in despair. Mariya's father and mother, Vasily and Lyubov Kochubey arrive with the guests, and dance and song are provided for Mazeppa's entertainment, including the famous Hopak.

Then Mazeppa draws Kochubey aside, and asks for his daughter's hand. Kochubey thinks he's joking at first – he is, after all, very old. Mazeppa claims that the passions of an old heart, once lit, are not like those of a young heart that burn brightly but then fade – they smoulder forever. Kochubey points out, however, that Mazeppa is Mariya's godfather, which is considered closer than a blood tie in the Russian Orthodox Church. Mazeppa replies that he can easily apply to the church for an exemption. Kochubey orders Mazeppa to leave. Mazeppa replies that he has already asked Mariya's hand, and been accepted, with a slight hint that he may already have had his way with Mariya. Kochubey still refuses, and Mazeppa calls in his guard. Mazeppa demands submission, everyone else curses his immoral desires and rise up against him, but just as battle is about to break out, Mariya throws herself between the two groups. As he leaves, Mazeppa calls for Mariya to decide whether she wishes to stay at home and never see him again, or to come with him. She chooses him to everyone's surprise and distress.

Scene 2: A room in Kochubey's manor

Lyubov mourns Mariya's loss, the women of the house trying to comfort her, to no avail. She sends them away and tries to stir Kochubey to rouse the Cossacks to war and go to attack Mazeppa – but he has a better plan: Whilst the two were still friends, Mazeppa hinted at a plan to ally with Sweden and fight to free Ukraine from Peter the Great's rule. Iskra, Kochubey's friend, is all for denouncing Mazeppa to Peter, but they need a messenger. Andrei, who feels his life is over after having lost Mariya, agrees to deliver it. Everyone curses Mazeppa and relishes the thought of his execution.

=== Act 2 ===
Scene 1: A dungeon in Mazeppa's castle, night.

The plan has not gone well. Peter the Great sided with Mazeppa, and turned Kochubey over to him, sending, as Kochubey puts it, a loyal servant into the hand of a treasonous one. Under torture, Kochubey has made a false confession. Kochubey is trying to make himself right with God, and thinks he hears the priest coming to hear his last confession – but instead, it turns out to be Orlik, Mazeppa's henchman and torturer. Kochubey asks what more he could want – he had agreed under torture to everything that had been asked of him. But he hadn't revealed the location of his hidden treasures. He tells them to send Mariya, who will show them everything, and let him pray before his execution: he has already lost his treasures – his honour to a false confession extracted under torture, Mariya's honour to Mazeppa, and now has only the prospect of God's vengeance after his death. This is not enough for Orlik – the tortures recommence.

Scene 2: A terrace of Mazeppa's castle. The same night

Mazeppa ponders the terrible blow that will befall Mariya when she learns what he has done to her father – he has to be strong whilst he's trying to consolidate his power, but Mariya... Orlik arrives. Kochubey has revealed nothing about his treasure as yet. The execution is set for dawn, and Orlik is sent off to resume what needs to be done. Mazeppa ponders Mariya and the night.

Mariya arrives, and flirts with him, but her thoughts turn darker – why is he spending so much time away from her of late? Why did he toast Poltava the other night? Who is she? She gave up everything for him – if he rejected her now... Mazeppa tries to calm her, unsuccessfully at first, but eventually succeeds. He reveals his plan to gain independence for Ukraine, making himself King and Mariya queen. Mariya thinks the crown would suit him very well. He then begins testing her out about her father – who does she care for more – her husband or her family? Eventually Mariya says she would give up – indeed, has given up, everything for him. Mazeppa leaves, reassured.

Lyubov arrives, and pleads with Mariya to go to Mazeppa to save Kochubey – only she can save him. Mariya, not knowing anything about it, takes some time to figure out what was going on, but then is horrified and faints, unable to bear it. Lyubov shakes her awake – the procession is already leaving. The two run off in an attempt to plead with Mazeppa for Kochubey's life.

Scene 3: By the town ramparts

The poor of the city have gathered for the execution, but their grim fears for Kochubey and hatred of Mazeppa are interrupted by a drunken Cossack singing a cheery little folk song. Mazeppa and Orlik arrive, Kochubey and Iskra are dragged on as prisoners and pray to God to forgive them. They are dragged to the stocks – the crowd gathers round – The axes are raised. Mariya and Lyubov arrive – just in time to see the axes fall. Lyubov rejects Mariya, who collapses in tears as the grim final chords of the chorus echo over the stage. Curtain.

=== Act 3 ===
Orchestral Interlude: The Battle of Poltava: Peter the Great's defeat of Mazeppa and Charles XII of Sweden

Scene 1: The ruins of Kochubey's estate, near the battlefield

Andrei has fought in the Battle of Poltava, but was unable to find Mazeppa. He wanders around the ruins of the estate, remembering happier times. Horsemen approach and he hides.

Mazeppa and Orlik are fleeing the battle, Mazeppa brooding over having once been powerful, but now, in one day, having lost everything. He sends Orlik off to prepare camp. Andrei springs out and challenges Mazeppa with his sword. Mazeppa warns Andrei he is armed. Andrei charges at him, sword waving... and Mazeppa shoots him.

Mariya arrives, completely mad. She does not recognise Mazeppa, and has convinced herself that her father's trick was just a joke played on her by her mother. But she sees blood everywhere. Mazeppa tries to comfort her – she starts to be, and babbles to him, but then sees blood on his face, and apologises: She had thought him someone else, but the person she thought he was had white hair, and his is covered with blood. Orlik returns and warns Mazeppa that troops approach – Mazeppa wants to take Mariya, but Orlik points out she'd slow them down. He asks whether Mazeppa cares more for a mad woman or his own head, and Mazeppa reluctantly leaves Mariya behind.

Mariya finds Andrei, and the blood on him – she cries out at finding blood everywhere, and remembers "dreams" of an execution. Andrei stirs, not quite dead, and Mariya mistakes him for a young child. He begs Mariya to look at him so he can see her face one last time – but she is in her own world, and just sings a lullaby to him, not realising what's happening or who he is. Part way through it, he dies, giving her one last farewell. Mariya continues rocking his corpse, singing the lullaby and staring into the distance as the opera ends.

== Historical basis of the plot ==
Vasyl Kochubey
(c.1640–1708)

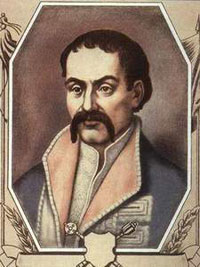
Pylyp Orlyk
(1672–1742)

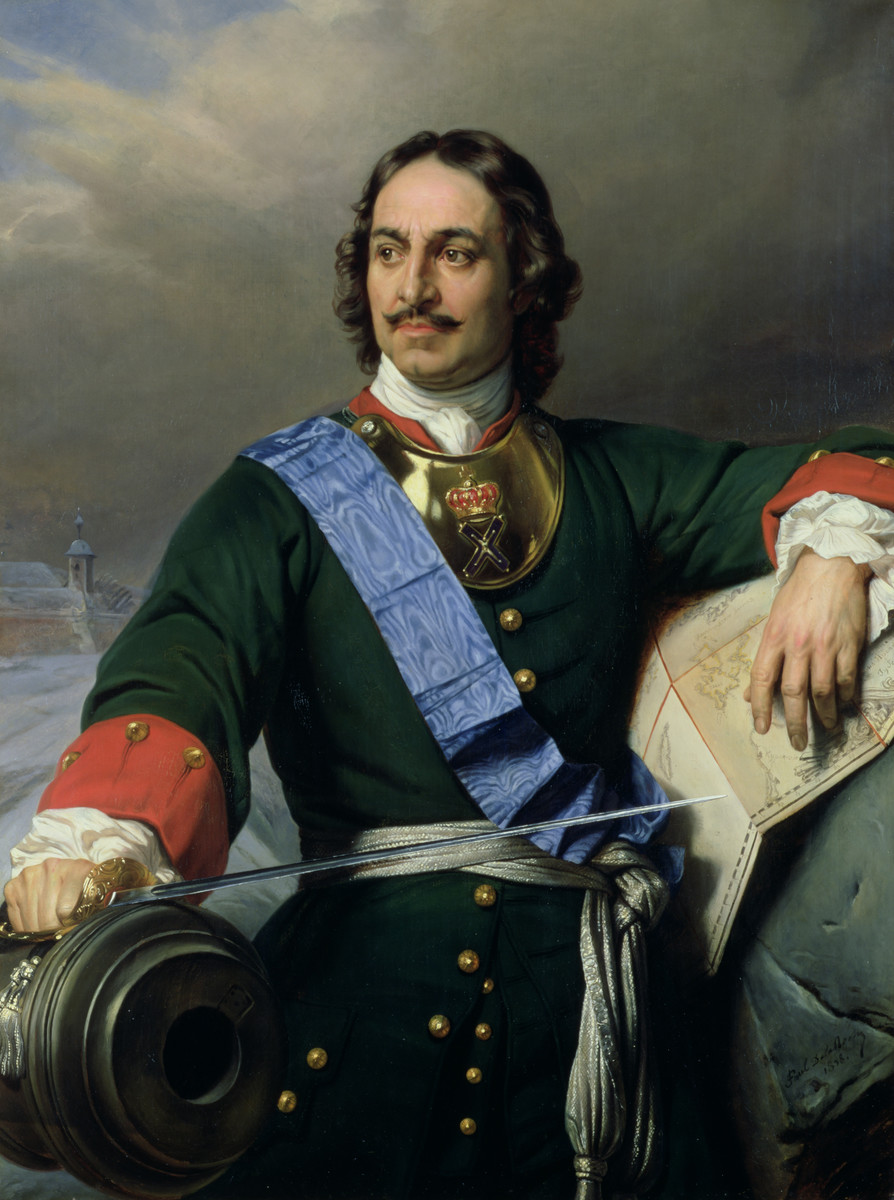
Peter I
(1672–1725)

== Structure ==
Introduction

Act 1

Scene 1

No.1 Chorus of Maidens and Scene: Я завью венок мой душистый (Ya zav'yu venok moy dushistiy)
No.2 Scene, Mariya's Arioso and Duet: Вам любы песни, милые подружки (Vam lyuby pesni, miliye podruzhki)
No.3 Scene: Ну, чествуешь, Василий, ты меня" (Nu, Cestvuyes', Vasiliy, ti menya)
No.4 Chorus and Dance: Нету, нету тут мосточка, нету переходу (Netu, netu tut mostocka, netu perekhodu)
No.4a Hopak
No.5 Scene and Mazeppa's Arioso: Вот хорошо, люблю... (Vot khoroso, lyublyu...)
No.6 Quarrel Scene: Мазепа, ты меня смущаешь речью (Mazeppa, ty menya smushchayesh' rech'yu)

Scene 2

No.7 Chorus and Mother's Lament: Не гроза небеса кроет тучею (Ne groza nebesa kroyet tucheyu)
No.8 Finale: Очнись от горя, Кочубей! (Ochnis' ot gorya, Kochubey!)

Act 2

Scene 1

No.9 Dungeon Scene: Так вот награда за донос (Tak Vot Nagrada Za Donos)

Scene 2

No.10 Mazeppa's Monologue and Scene with Orlik: Тиха украинская ночь (Tikha ukraynskaya noch)
No.10a Mazeppa's Arioso: О Мария, Мария! (O, Mariya, Mariya!)
No.11 Mazeppa's Scene with Mariya: Мой милый друг! (Moy Miliy Drug!)
No.12 Scene Between Mariya and her Mother: Как блещут звёзды в небе (Kak blescut zvyozdi v Nebe)

Scene 3

No.13 Crowd Scene and Drunken Cossack's Song: Скоро ли? Везут аль нет?... Молодушка, молода (Skoro Li? Vezut al' net? ... Molodushka, moloda)
No.14 Finale: Ой, гой, чумандра, чумандриха молода! (Oy, goy, chumandra, chumandrikha Moloda!)

Act 3

No.15 Entr'acte: The Battle Of Poltava

Scene

No.16 Scene and Andrei's Aria: В бою кровавом, на поле чести (V boyu krovavom, na pole chesti)
No.17 Scene and Duet: Невдалеке я слышу топот (Nevdaleke ya slishu topot...)
No.18 Onset of Mariya's Madness: Несчастный! видит Бог, я не хотел твоей погибели (Nescastniy! Vidit Bog, ya ne khotel tvoey pogibeli)
No.19 Finale: Ушёл старик, как сердце бьётся (Ushol starik, kak serdtse byotsya)

== Related works ==
The work was also arranged by Tchaikovsky for voices with piano (1883).

== Recordings ==
- 1949, Vasiliy Nebolsin (conductor), Bolshoy Theatre Orchestra and Chorus; Aleksey Ivanov (Mazepa), Nina Pokrovskaya (Mariya), Ivan Petrov (Kochubey), Vera Davydova (Lyubov), Grigoriy Bolshakov (Andrey), Vsevolod Tyutyunnik (Orlik), Tikhon Tchernyakov (Iskra)
- 1982, Fuat Mansurov (conductor), Bolshoy Theatre Orchestra and Chorus; Vladimir Valaitis (Mazepa), Tamara Milashkina (Mariya), Yevgeny Nesterenko (Kochubey), Irina Arkhipova (Lyubov), Vladislav Pyavko (Andrey)
- 1993, Neeme Järvi (conductor), Gothenburg Symphony Orchestra, Chorus of the Royal Opera Stockholm; Sergei Leiferkus (Mazepa), Larissa Diadkova (Lyubov), Galina Gorchakova (Mariya), Anatoly Kocherga (Kochubey), Sergej Larin (Andrey), Richard Margison (Iskra), Monte Pederson (Orlik), Heinz Zednik (Drunken Cossack)
- 1996, Valery Gergiev (conductor), Kirov Opera Orchestra and Chorus; Nikolai Putilin (Mazepa), Irina Loskutova (Mariya), Sergei Aleksashkin (Kochubey), Larissa Diadkova (Lyubov), Viktor Lutsiuk (Andrey), Nikolai Gassiev (Drunken Cossack)
