= Henry Milner =

Henry Milner may refer to:

- Henry Ernest Milner (1845–1906), English civil engineer and landscape architect
- Henry M. Milner, 19th-century British playwright and author
