= Luigi Piccioli =

Italian musician, singer, voice instructor, and professor

Luigi Piccioli (1812–1862) was an Italian musician, singer, voice instructor, and professor of the Saint Petersburg Conservatory.

He became famous for his guitar playing, and toured throughout Europe. In Russia he was a professor and music director at the Court of Saint Petersburg. His brother was the lawyer and orator Giuseppe Piccioli.

Composer Peter Tchaikovsky, when he was 17, was instructed in Italian opera and language by Piccioli, who claimed to be aged 50 at the time. This made Tchaikovsky to form an enduring passion for Italian music. In 1856 Piccioli encouraged the young Tchaikovsky to write his first published composition, a short Italian-style song or canzonetta called Mezza Notte, for soprano or tenor and piano.

Piccioli also taught many others including Russian baritone Bogomir Korsov. In the early 1860s, Piccioli was part of the Moscow branch of the Russian Musical Society.
