= Poltava (poem) =

1829 poem by Alexander Pushkin

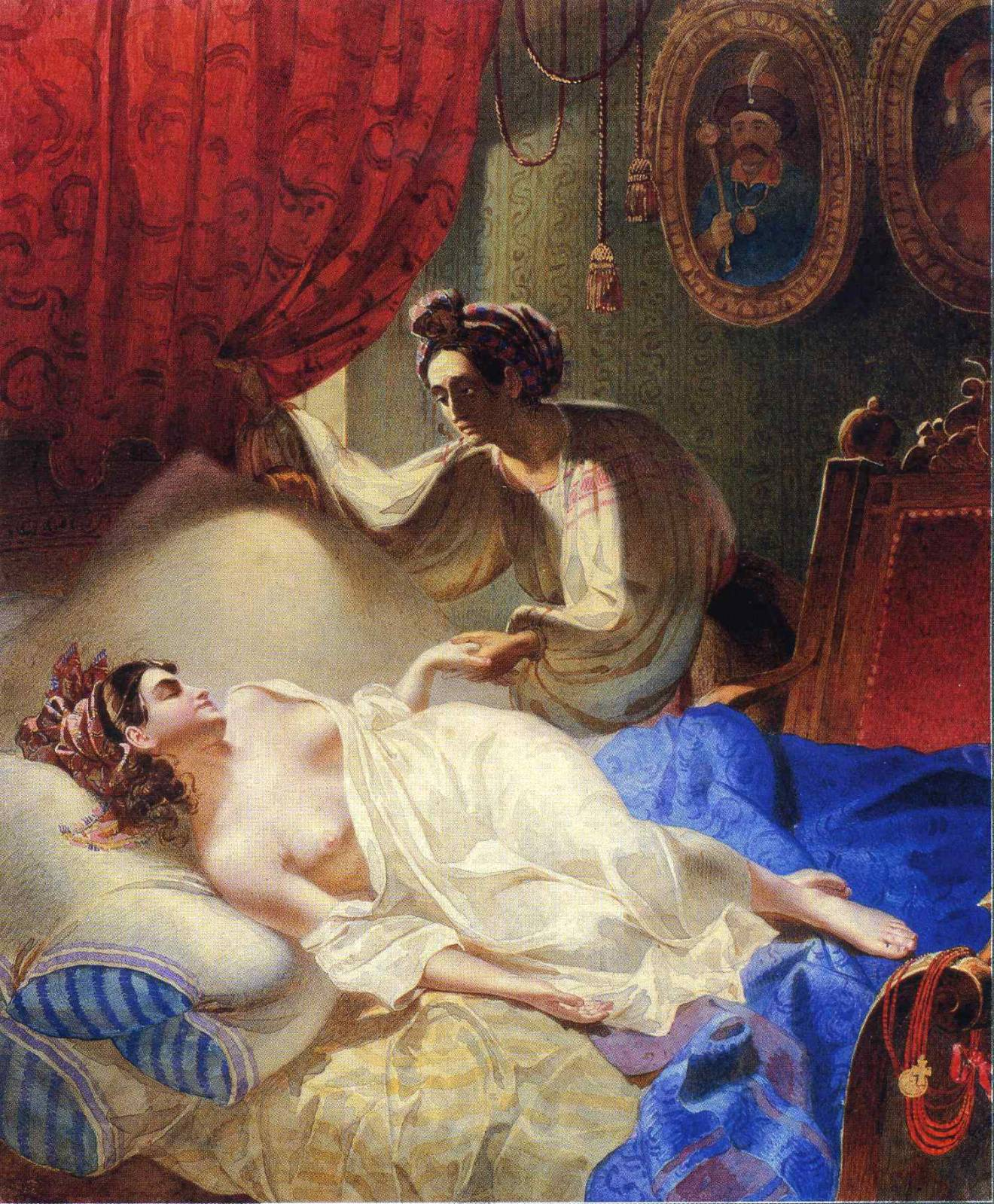
- An 1840 watercolor painting by Taras Shevchenko depicting Maria and her mother
- Author: Aleksandr Pushkin
- Original title: Полтава [Poltava]
- Translator: Jacob Krup, 1936.
- Language: Russian
- Genre: Narrative Poem
- Publication date: 1829
- Publication place: Russia

Poltava (Russian: «Полтава») is a narrative poem written by Aleksandr Pushkin in 1828–29 about the involvement of the Ukrainian Cossack hetman Ivan Mazepa in the 1709 Battle of Poltava between Sweden and Russia. (Note: A note on spelling: Mazeppa is a historical spelling, but both Pushkin and modern Russian use Mazepa, which this article will also use. Contemporary English usage typically uses Mazepa for the historical personage and maintains Mazeppa for historical depictions such as Byron's poem.) The poem intertwines a love plot between Mazepa and Maria with an account of Mazepa's betrayal of Tsar Peter I and Peter's victory in battle. Although often considered one of Pushkin's lesser works and critiqued as unabashedly imperialistic, a number of critics have praised the poem for its depth of characterization and its ability to synthesize disparate genres. The poem inspired Tchaikovsky's 1884 opera Mazeppa.

== Outline of the poem ==
The poem opens with an epigraph from Byron's 1819 poem Mazeppa, which depicts the Hetman as a Romantic hero, exiled from Poland for conducting a love affair with a married noblewoman. Pushkin follows this epigraph with a passionate dedication to an anonymous loved one. The first edition carried a foreword [предисловие] in which Puskhin objects to the heroic presentation of Ivan Mazepa in works by other writers and states his intention to correct them by depicting Mazepa as he actually was.

The poem itself is divided into three parts – or "songs" [песни] – of roughly equal length. Part I opens by setting the scene in the estate of the nobleman Vasily Kochubei, and describing the beauty of his daughter Maria. Maria has fallen in love with the Hetman Mazepa, who is her godfather and much older than she is: therefore they keep their love secret. However, they are quickly discovered, and are forced to elope, which brings shame on the family and leaves their parents scared.

The narrative then switches to a description of the political trouble in Ukraine: there is a significant support for a break with Russia; Mazepa is supporting the rebels. Kochubei vows to take revenge upon Mazepa for breaking the bond of trust between them and eloping with Maria. He has remained loyal to the Tsar and sends a messenger to denounce the Hetman to the Tsar.

Most of Part II is written as a dramatic dialogue in the tradition of closet drama. Mazepa is focused on his plans to rebel against the Tsar, and Maria is worried that he no longer loves her. He asks her to promise that she would always choose him over her father, but declines to tell her of his betrayal of the Tsar.

Meanwhile, Kochubei has been captured by the rebels; he is tortured and interrogated by Orlik. The rebels demand to know where he has hidden his money but he declines to reply. Maria's mother comes to find her and help her to save her father; but they arrive too late: Kochubei has already been executed. Mazepa, tormented on discovering Maria's disappearance, sets out to look for her.

Part III switches back to a single third-person narrator. Mazepa pretends that his physical health is failing, so as to lull the Tsar's vigilance, while King Charles XII of Sweden is preparing for battle against Peter I. Peter I and his cavalry arrive and defeat the Swedish army and the Ukrainian rebels. Mazepa does little fighting and flees the battlefield as fast as he can. He finds he can no longer sleep and sees Maria again. This time it's clear that she has lost her mind (she couldn't get over her father's execution). In a memorable passage, Maria no longer recognizes him, because she sees him for what he truly is: a ridiculous and horrible old man.

The poem closes with a reflection by the narrator a century later, claiming that while Mazepa is now forgotten, Peter I, the battle’s hero, has created an enormous monument for himself. The narrator states that he does not know Maria's fate.

== Historical sources and inspiration ==
Ivan Mazepa, Vasily Kochubei, and Kochubei's daughter Maria (Motrya) are historical figures. According to historians, it is true that Mazepa had a romantic interest in Maria and she went to live in his home, but whether they were involved in a relationship is unclear. In reality, Mazepa and Maria did not elope: Kochubei removed her from Mazepa's home and sent her to a convent.

It is true that Kochubei denounced Mazepa to Peter in 1706 for conspiring against him with Charles XII of Sweden, but it is unclear if Kochubei had evidence of this alleged conspiracy. However, in 1708 Charles and Mazepa did sign a secret treaty, and they did fight against Peter I in the battle of Poltava.

As Pushkin's Foreword makes clear, he had read a number of sympathetic treatments of Ivan Mazepa and was seeking to respond to them. He was responding both to Byron's Mazeppa and to a poem Voinarovskii by the Russian Decembrist poet Kondraty Ryleyev which praises Mazepa.

== Analysis ==
This poem has received considerably less attention than Pushkin's other narrative poems, and its reception has been mixed. A.D.P. Briggs sees Pushkin's fusion genres and subject matter as unsuccessful, calls it overly-long - at nearly 1500 lines it is one of the longest of Pushkin's narrative poems - and protests the lack of variety in rhyme. Babinski also makes the charge that the disparate elements in the poem are not well-integrated, suggesting the poem is "not a continuous narrative... barely a narrative poem at all, more like a three-act play with an all-purpose narrator to keep the material together."

Several critics have made the charge that Poltava is an apology for Russian imperialism. J.P. Pauls (1962) accuses Pushkin of "propagating the Russian imperialistic cause" and "distorting" historical truth. This view is echoed by Svetlana Evdokimova (1999), who contrasts what she sees as unabashed patriotism of Poltava with the richer, more ambiguous portrayal of Peter I and Empire in The Bronze Horseman (1833). Pushkin's biographer Henri Troyat suggested that Pushkin deliberately wrote a pro-Imperial poem in order to assuage Tsar Nicholas I, who was suspicious of his political loyalties after his return from exile.

Soviet critics tended to be more sympathetic towards the poem. V.M. Zhirmunskii (1924) sees the poem as the moment of Pushkin's decisive break with Byron, arguing that Pushkin uses a moral and historical perspective to create psychological portraits and evaluations of his characters, while Byron relies on emotion alone. S.M. Bondi argues that Pushkin successfully pulls together historical and personal themes and the poem is a valuable meditation on the place of the Russian state among European powers. However, while Pushkin certainly made the claim that he was writing a historically-accurate poem, Babinski points out "for all his insistence upon historicity, Pushkin slanted the facts."

Western critics who have been kinder to Poltava have focused on its characterization. John Bayley says that Mazepa "has something of the depth of a Shakespeare portrait". David Bethea also suggests that Poltava owes something to Shakespearean characterization. The most sympathetic is the book-length treatment of the poem by Virginia Burns (2005), which praises it for its successful characterization, tight structure and the scope of its philosophical inquiry.

== Composition and publication ==
Pushkin's notebooks show that he began Poltava on April 5, 1828, and completed the rest of it in October: Song I on October 3, Song II on October 9, Song III on October 16 and the Dedication on October 27. He finished the Foreword on 31 January 1829 and the poem was published later that year.

== Influence ==
Tchaikovsky's 1884 opera Mazeppa was loosely based on Poltava.

== Sources ==
- Pushkin, A.S., tr. Walter Arndt. (1984) Collected Narrative and Lyric Poetry. Ann Arbor, Michigan: Ardis. (Inc. recent translation of Poltava)
- Pushkin, A.S. (1949) Polnoe sobranie sochinenii v desiati tomakh. Moscow and Leningrad: Izd. Akademiia Nauk SSSR.
- Burns, Virginia. (2005) Pushkin's Poltava: a literary structuralist interpretation. Lanham, Maryland: University Press of America.
- Babinski, H. F. (1974). The Mazeppa legend in European Romanticism. New York, Columbia University Press.
- Prymak, Thomas M., "The Cossack Hetman: Ivan Mazepa in History and Legend from Peter to Pushkin," The Historian, LXXVII, 2 (2014), 237-77.
