= Henry M. Milner =

British playwright

- Writing career
- Period: 19th century
- Genres: Melodrama; Popular tragedy

Henry M. Milner was a 19th-century British playwright and author of melodramas and popular tragedies. Milner wrote numerous plays, including two popular equestrian dramas/hippodramas featuring live horses on stage. These are: Mazeppa; or, the Wild Horse of Tartary (which was based on Lord Byron's 1819 poem), which kicked off a wave of interest in the legend and Dick Turpin's Ride to York; or, Bonny black Bess, about the famous highwayman and his horse. Both of these plays included great spectacle in performance and enjoyed great popular success during the mid to late nineteenth century. Mazeppa was extremely popular and often produced; it is recalled as one of, if not the most, significant and popular equestrian drama of all time.

Another of Milner's noteworthy and successful works is, The Man and The Monster; or The Fate of Frankenstein, with O. Smith as The Monster and which opened on 3 July 1826 at the Royal Coburg Theatre (now known as The Old Vic), eight years after Mary Shelley's Frankenstein was published. Subsequent film adaptations follow Milner's example, in making Frankenstein's monstrous creation a pivotal scene.

== See also ==
- Dick Turpin's Ride to York, 1922 film

== Partial list of works ==
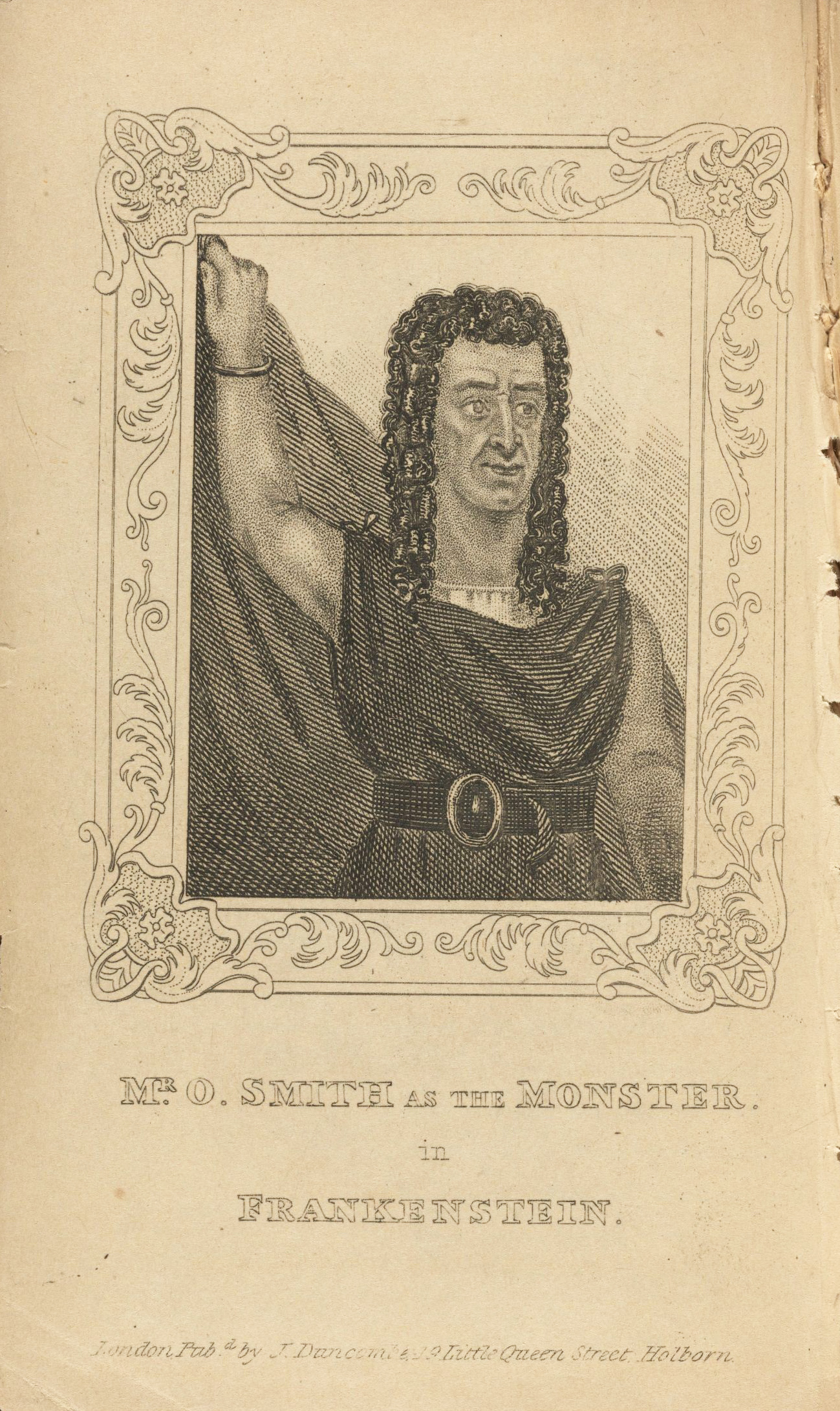
Promptbook from Milner's Frankenstein, or, The Man and the Monster!

- Milner, H. M. (1800), Victorine: the maid of Paris : a domestic drama, in four acts. 19th century British drama, no. 430. London: J. Dicks., OCLC 222048541
- Milner, H. M., The gambler's fate; or, Thirty years in a gamester's life. A drama, in two acts. New York: Samuel French., OCLC 2325482
- Milner, H. M. & Byron, G. G. B., Mazeppa; or, The wild horse of Tartary. A romantic drama, in three acts. Dramatised from Lord Byron's poem by H.M. Milner, and adapted to the stage under the direction of Mr. Ducrow. London: Dicks., OCLC 31254994 (See Cultural legacy of Mazeppa#The 1830s-1860s)
- Milner, H. M., Gustavus the third, or, the masked ball! Collection of American and English plays, v. 69. London: J. Duncombe., OCLC 77535789
- Milner, H. M. & Scott, W., The fair maid of Perth; or, The battle of the inch; a...drama in three acts; founded on Sir Walter Scott's novel. London: Lacy., OCLC 80915660
- Milner, H. M. (1818), Plays: (submitted to the Lord Chamberlain's Office)., OCLC 81211080
- Milner, H. M., Theatre Royal, Covent Garden (London, England), Payne, J. H., & Bishop, H. R. (1824). Theatre Royal, Covent-Garden, this present Saturday, June 12, 1824, will be acted, a comedy in one act, called Twelve precisely ... after which (8th time) a new comedy, in three acts, (with some musick) called Charles the Second, or, The merry monarch, the musick composed by Mr. Bishop ... to which will be added (2d time) the revived musical entertainment of Brother and sister, the musick composed by Mr. Bishop. [London]: Printed by W. Reynolds., OCLC 84587683
- Milner, H. M. (1826), Frankenstein, or, The man and the monster: a melo drama in two acts ... as performed at the London theatres. London: J. Duncombe &., OCLC 81989936
- Milner, H. M. (1830), Masaniello, or, The dumb girl of Portici a musical drama, in three acts. New-York: R.H. Elton., OCLC 53994379
- Milner, H. M. & Ducange, V. (1872), The hut of the red mountain, or, Thirty years of a gambler's life: a drama in three acts. London: S. French., OCLC 14959371
- Milner, H. M. (1872), The veteran of 102 years, or, Five generations: a drama in one act. London: S. French., OCLC 14959381
- Milner, H. M. (1885), Turpin's Ride to York: or, Bonny Black Bess, etc. London., OCLC 84779576
