= Ippolit Al'tani =

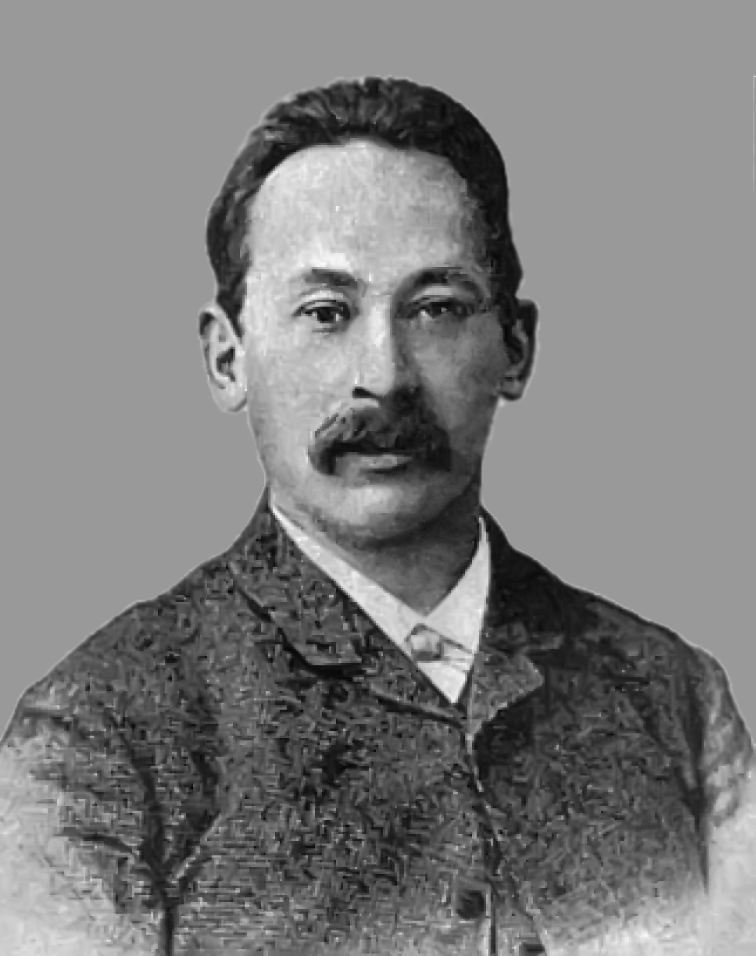
Ippolit Al'tani, 1887

Ippolit Karlovich Al'tani (Russian: Ипполит Карлович Альтани; Ukrainian: Альтані Іполит Карлович, Altani Ipolit Karlovich; 27 May [OS 15 May] 1846 – 17 February 1919) was a Russian conductor, choirmaster and violinist.

Al'tani was born in the south of Russian Empire. In 1866 he graduated from Saint Petersburg conservatory as a violinist (studied under Henryk Wieniawski) and composer (studied with Nikolai Zaremba, and Anton Rubinstein). In 1867-82 he worked as a conductor and choirmaster at the Russian opera in Kiev. Al'tani's activity contributed to the development of musical stage skill in Ukraine. In 1882-1906 Al'tani was chief conductor of the Bolshoi Theatre in Moscow.

Al'tani had a significant association with Tchaikovsky. He conducted the first performance of the 1812 Overture (1882) and the first performances at the Bolshoi Theatre of his operas Mazeppa (1884), The Enchantress (1890), The Queen of Spades (1891) and Iolanta (1893).

Al'tani also conducted the 1888 Moscow premiere of the revised 1872 version of Mussorgsky's Boris Godunov, and the world premiere of Rachmaninoff's Aleko (1893).

He died in Moscow.

== Bibliography ==
- [I. K. Al'tani] И. К. Альтани..., «Русская музыкальная газета», 1902, No. 41;
- [Ippolit Karlovich Al'tani] Ипполит Карлович Альтани. (По поводу 25-летия его дирижёрской деятельности), в кн.: Ежегодник императорских театров, в. 6–7, [СПБ], 1909.
