= 1812 Overture =

1880 concert overture by Pyotr Ilyich Tchaikovsky

- Concert overture by Pyotr Ilyich Tchaikovsky
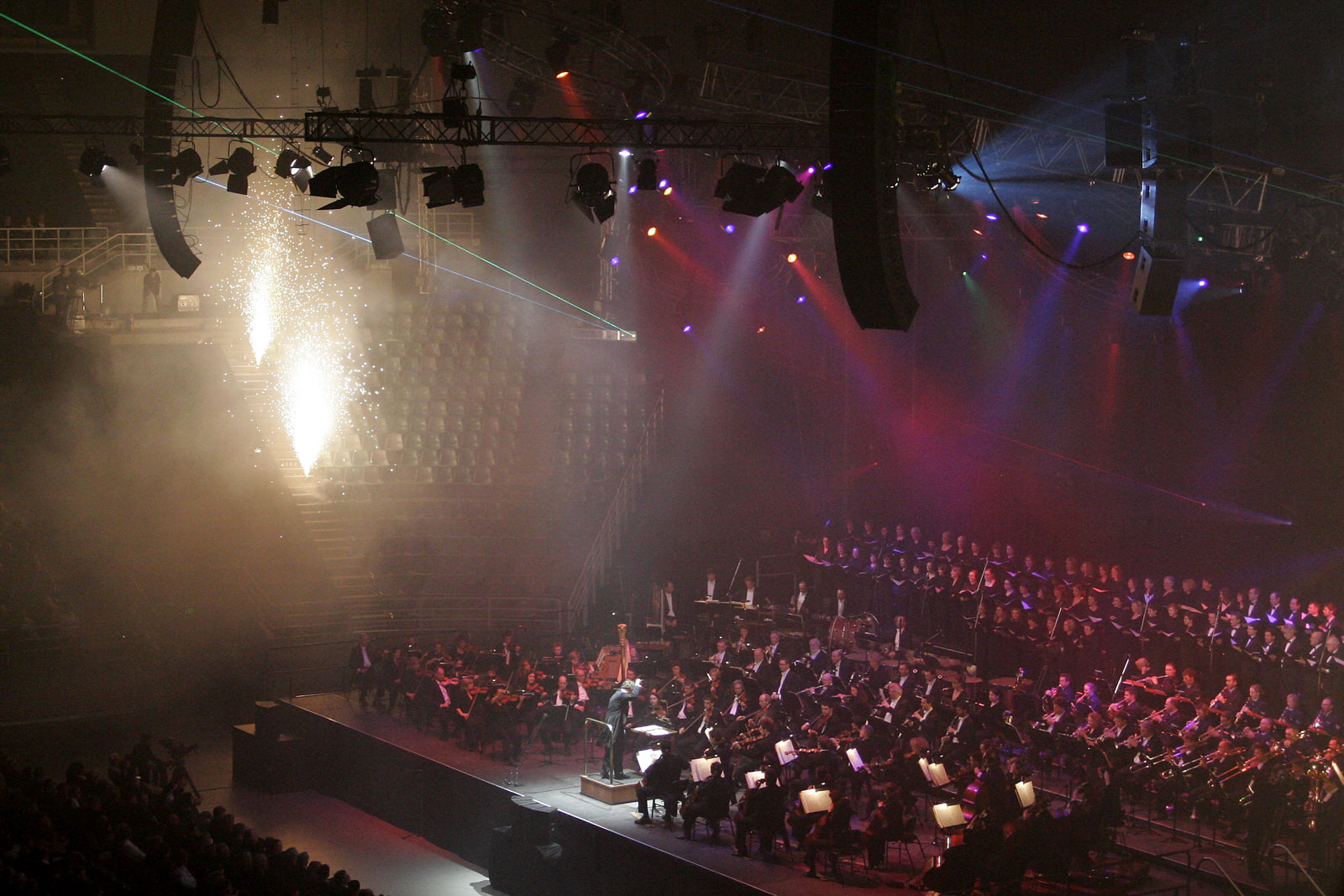
- A performance, with cannon fire, at the 2005 Classical Spectacular in Melbourne, Australia
- Key: E♭ major
- Opus: 49
- Occasion: Commemoration of the 1812 Russian defense against Napoleon's invading Grande Armée
- Composed: 1880

Premiere
- Date: 20 August 1882; 144 years ago
- Location: Moscow
- Conductor: Ippolit Al'tani

The Year 1812, Solemn Overture, Op. 49, popularly known as the 1812 Overture, is a concert overture in E♭ major written in 1880 by Russian composer Pyotr Ilyich Tchaikovsky. The piece commemorates Russia's successful defense against the French invasion of the nation in 1812.

Written in just 6 weeks the Overture's first public performance, conducted by Ippolit Al'tani, took place in Moscow on 20 August [O.S. 8 August] 1882, under a tent, near the still unfinished Cathedral of Christ the Saviour, which also memorialised the 1812 defense of Russia.

The 15-minute overture is best known for its climactic volley of cannon fire, ringing chimes, and a brass fanfare finale. It has also become a common accompaniment to fireworks displays on the United States' Independence Day. The 1812 Overture went on to become one of Tchaikovsky's most popular works, along with his ballet scores to The Nutcracker, The Sleeping Beauty, and Swan Lake.

== Instrumentation ==
The 1812 Overture is scored for an orchestra that consists of the following:

- Brass band: "Open" instrumentation consisting of "any extra brass instruments" available. In some indoor performances, the part may be played on an organ. Military or marching bands also play this part. Note: the brass band or its substitute is meant to play during the finale only.
- Woodwinds: 1 piccolo, 2 flutes, 2 oboes, 1 cor anglais, 2 clarinets in B♭ and 2 bassoons
- Brass: 4 horns in F, 2 cornets in B♭, 2 trumpets in E♭, 3 trombones (2 tenor, 1 bass) and 1 tuba
- Percussion: timpani, orchestral bass drum, snare drum, cymbals, tambourine, triangle, carillon
- Strings: violins I & II, violas, cellos and double basses.
- Artillery: One battery of cannons or ceremonial field artillery.

The carillon is sometimes replaced with tubular bells or recordings of carillons, or even church bells. In the sections that contain cannon shots, actual cannons are sometimes replaced by howitzers, tanks, fireworks, recorded cannons, or played on a piece of staging, usually with a large wooden mallet or sledgehammer as used in Mahler's 6th Symphony. The bass drum, and gong/tam-tam are also regularly used as cannon substitutes or adjuncts in indoor performances.

In his 1966 Deutsche Grammophon recording, Herbert von Karajan scored the first 02'43" (or 36 bars) for voices instead of strings at the start and the subsequent dialogue between strings and woodwind, adding the Russian Orthodox plainchant God Preserve Thy People text to the melody and slightly rearranging the texture to suit voices a capella rather than instruments. Two years later, the American conductor Igor Buketoff, son of a Russian Orthodox priest, went a stage further on his RCA Victrola recording with the New Philharmonia Orchestra. Not only did he deploy voices for the opening chant but he also had a children's chorus sing the folk tune "By the Gates" and brought the choir back to bolster the chant and the Russian Imperial national anthem God Save the Tsar!.

== Composition ==
=== Historical background: Napoleon's invasion of Russia ===
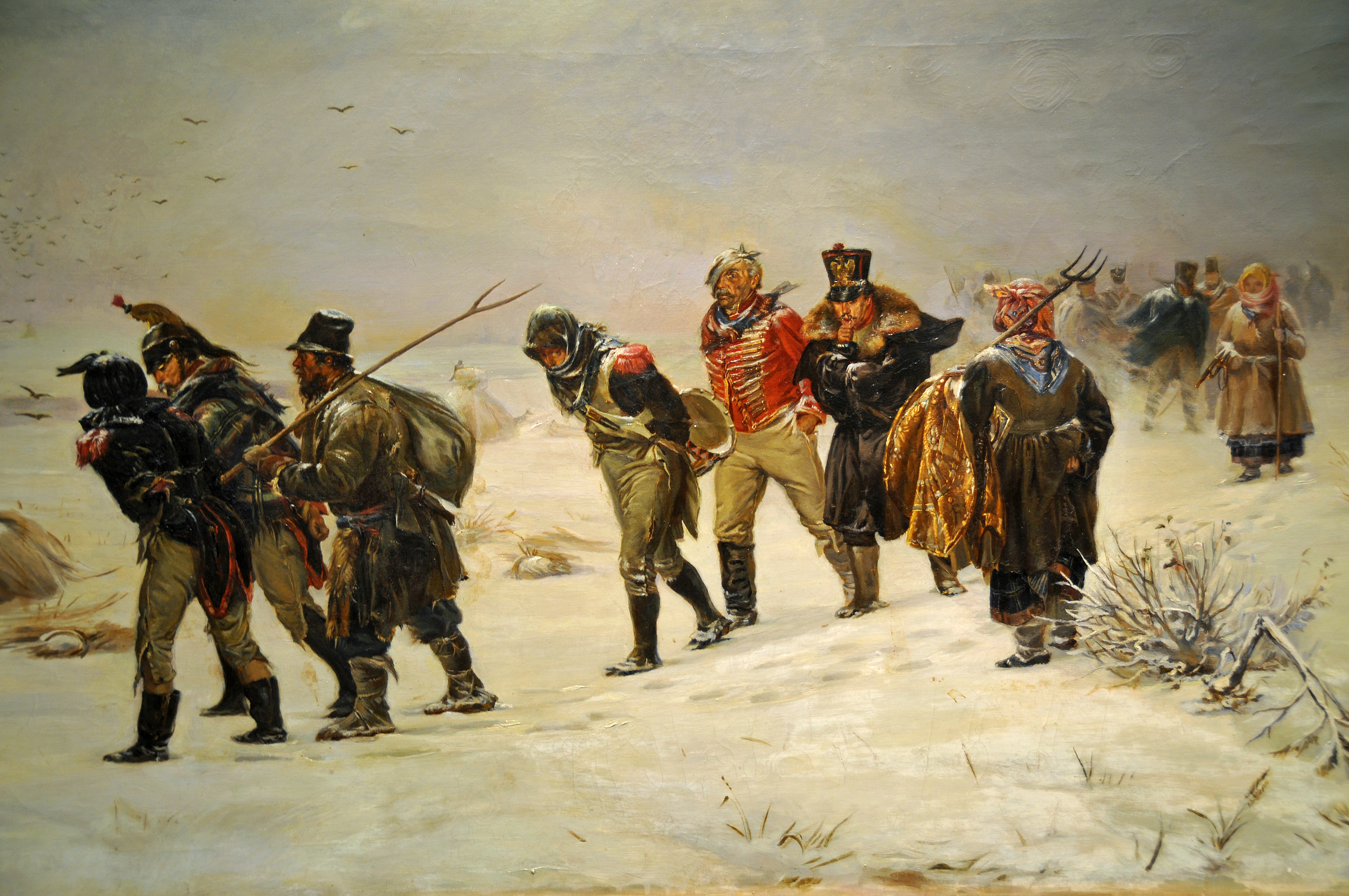
A scene depicting the French retreat from Russia in 1812, painting by Illarion Pryanishnikov (1874)

On 7 September 1812, at Borodino, 120 km (75 mi) west of Moscow, Napoleon's forces met those of General Mikhail Kutuzov in a concerted stand made by Russia against the seemingly invincible French Army. The Battle of Borodino saw casualties estimated as high as 100,000 and the French were masters of the field. It was, however, ultimately a pyrrhic victory for the French invasion.

With resources depleted and supply lines overextended, Napoleon's weakened forces moved into Moscow, which they occupied with no delegation to receive the conquerors. Expecting a capitulation from Tsar Alexander I, the French instead found themselves in a barren and desolate city. To make things worse, 48 hours after Napoleon's entry to the Russian city on 14 September 1812, three quarters of Moscow was burned to the ground.

Deprived of winter stores, Napoleon had to retreat. Beginning on 19 October and lasting well into December, the French Army faced several overwhelming obstacles on its long retreat: famine, typhus, freezing temperatures, harassing cossacks, and Russian forces barring the way out of the country. Abandoned by Napoleon in November, the Grande Armée was reduced to one-tenth of its original size by the time it reached Poland and relative safety.

In 1869, the full edition of War and Peace by Leo Tolstoy was published. The novel reported a very accurate description of the Napoleonic invasion of 1812, reviving memories of the Russian resistance. This led to the commissioning of new monuments, paintings and also of new musical compositions, including Tchaikovsky's.

=== Commission ===
The Cathedral of Christ the Saviour, commissioned in 1812 by Tsar Alexander I to commemorate the Russian victory, was nearing completion in Moscow in 1880; the 25th anniversary of the coronation of Alexander II would be at hand in 1881; and the 1882 All-Russia Arts and Industry Exhibition at Moscow was in the planning stage. Tchaikovsky's friend and mentor Nikolai Rubinstein suggested that he write a grand commemorative piece for use in related festivities. Tchaikovsky began work on the project on 12 October 1880, finishing it six weeks later.

Organizers planned to have the overture performed in the square before the cathedral, with a brass band to reinforce the orchestra, the bells of the cathedral, and all the others in downtown Moscow playing "zvons" (pealing bells) on cue – and cannons, fired from an electric switch panel to achieve the precision the musical score required. However, this performance did not take place, possibly due in part to the over-ambitious plan. Regardless, the assassination of Alexander II that March deflated much of the impetus for the project. In 1882, during the All-Russia Arts and Industry Exhibition, the Overture was performed in a tent next to the unfinished cathedral. The cathedral was completed on 26 May 1883.

Meanwhile, Tchaikovsky complained to his patron Nadezhda von Meck that he was "... not a conductor of festival pieces," and that the Overture would be "... very loud and noisy, but [without] artistic merit, because I wrote it without warmth and without love." Sometime earlier, the composer had confided to his publisher Pyotr Jurgenson that "Neither in the jubilee of the high-ranking person (who has always been quite antipathetic towards me), nor in the cathedral, which again I don’t like at all, is there anything that could stir my imagination." He put it together in six weeks. It is this work that would make the Tchaikovsky estate exceptionally wealthy, as it is one of the most performed and recorded works from his catalog.

In Russia, during the Soviet era, the imperial anthem was replaced with the chorus "Glory, Glory to you, holy Rus'!" (Славься, славься, святая Русь!), which came from the finale of Mikhail Glinka's opéra Ivan Susanin, a historical drama about a patriotic commoner of the same name. The original version of the song, written by Vasily Zhukovsky and Egor Fyodorovich Rozen, praised the Tsar and the Russian Tsardom, while the latter version by Sergey Gorodetsky was one of a patriotic form and is sometimes regarded as the unofficial anthem of Russia in the 20th century and even today. With the dissolution of the Soviet Union at the end of the Cold War, the original score returned.

=== Adaptation in other contexts ===
As a rousing patriotic hymn, the Overture has subsequently been adapted into and associated with other contexts than that of the Russian resistance to Napoleon's invasion. The 1812 Overture is popularly known in the United States as a symbol of the United States Independence Day, a tradition that dates back to a 1974 choice made by Arthur Fiedler for a performance at the Boston Pops July 4 concert. An earlier outdoors July presentation in the U.S. was by the National Symphony Orchestra, led by Howard Mitchell, on 7 July 1950—incorporation eight 75mm Howitzers. According to the NSO's management, the performance celebrated the sesquicentennial of the relocation of America's capital from Philadelphia to Washington, DC.

The piece was parodied by composer Malcolm Arnold in A Grand, Grand Overture which features four rifles, three Hoover vacuum cleaners (two uprights in B♭ and one horizontal with detachable sucker in C), and an electric floor polisher in E♭; it is dedicated to President Hoover. The piece was also parodied by P. D. Q. Bach for the 1989 musical album 1712 Overture and Other Musical Assaults. The 2026 movie Coyote vs. Acme used a portion of the overture which replaced some instruments and cannons with the Road Runner's iconic "beep beep" for the movie's climax.

== Structure ==
U Vorot, Vorot is a folk song brought up in the piece representing the Russian people

The piece begins with the simple, plaintive Russian melody of the Eastern Orthodox Troparion of the Holy Cross (also known as "O Lord, Save Thy People") played by four cellos and two violas. This represents the Russian people praying for the victory. Then, the French national anthem, "La Marseillaise", is heard, representing the invading French army. Then, the melody of "La Marseillaise" is heard competing against Russian folk music, representing the two armies fighting each other as the French approached Moscow. At this point, five cannon shots are heard, representing the Battle of Borodino. This is where "La Marseillaise" is most prominent, and seems to be winning. After this, a long descending run represents the French army retreating out of Moscow as the freezing winter winds rage on. At the end of this run the opening motif is repeated, which can be interpreted as prayers being answered. The grand finale culminates with eleven more cannon shots and the melody of "God Save the Tsar!".

=== Anachronism of nationalist motifs ===
Although La Marseillaise was chosen as the French national anthem in 1795, it was revoked by Napoleon in 1805 and forbidden from being played in his presence, and would not have been played during the Russian campaign. It was only reinstated as the French anthem in 1879 – the year before the commission of the overture – which can explain its use by Tchaikovsky in the overture. "Chant du départ", nicknamed "the brother of the Marseillaise" by French Republican soldiers, served as the official anthem of Napoleon's regime. However, it had been largely forgotten by 1882, while educated Russians of the time were likely to be familiar with the tune of "La Marseillaise" and recognize its significance.

Although "God Save the Tsar!" was the Russian national anthem during Tchaikovsky's lifetime, it did not exist in 1812. There was no official Russian anthem until 1815, from which time until 1833 the anthem was "The Prayer of Russians" (Molitva russkikh), sung to the tune of "God Save the King". The two songs both start with the same words, God Save the Tsar!, but diverge after that.

=== Themes ===
O Lord, Save thy People represents the praying for deliverance from the invading army. A part of this hymn translates to "Grant victory to all Orthodox Christians over their enemies." By including this hymn in the piece, Tchaikovsky is suggesting that God granted the Orthodox Russians victory over the French imperial troops. Later in the piece when La Marseillaise is played, it seems as though the Russians will lose the battle. Then O Lord, Save thy People, along with God Save the Tsar!, is played powerfully in the brass section with a strong display of chimes in the background. The ringing chimes are written to represent the bells of Moscow. The Bells of Moscow hold significance, because in the Russian Orthodox religion, the bells symbolize the voice of God.

== Lyrics ==
In the introduction, the prayer Tropar Krestu (Troparion to the Cross) is used. There are four versions of this prayer used in the introduction.

First version

Russian

Спаси, Господи, люди Твоя,
И благослови достояние Твоё.
Победы борющимся за веру правую и за святую Русь,
На сопротивныя даруя.
И Твоё сохраняя,
Крестом Твоим жительство.

Transliteration

Spasi, Gospodi, liudi Tvoya,
I blagoslovi dostoyaniye Tvoyo.
Pobedy boriushchimsia za veru pravuyu i za sviatuyu Rus',
Na soprotivnyya daruya.
I Tvoyo sokhraniaya,
Krestom Tvoim zhitelstvo.

Second version

Russian

Спаси, Господи, люди Твоя,
И благослови достояние Твоё.
Победы Христолюбивому воинству и Богохранимей державе,
На сопротивныя даруя.
И Твоё сохраняя,
Крестом Твоим жительство.

Transliteration

Spasi, Gospodi, liudi Tvoya,
I blagoslovi dostoyanye Tvoyo.
Pobedy Khristoliubivomu voinstvu i Bogokhranimey derzhave,
Na soprotivnyya daruya.
I Tvoyo sokhraniaya,
Krestom Tvoim zhitelstvo.

Third version

Russian

Спаси, Господи, люди Твоя,
И благослови достояние Твоё.
Победы благоверному Императору нашему Николаю Александровичу,
На сопротивныя даруя.
И Твоё сохраняя,
Крестом Твоим жительство.

Transliteration

Spasi, Gospodi, liudi Tvoya,
I blagoslovi dostoyanie Tvoyo.
Pobedy blagovernomu Imperatoru nashemu Nikolayu Aleksandrovichu,
Na soprotivnyya daruya.
I Tvoyo sokhraniaya,
Krestom Tvoim zhitelstvo.

Fourth version

Russian

Спаси, Господи, люди Твоя,
И благослови достояние Твоё.
Спаси, Господи, люди Твоя, и благослови достояние Твоё,
На сопротивныя даруя.
И Твое сохраняя,
Крестом Твоим жительство.

Transliteration

Spasi, Gospodi, liudi Tvoya,
I blagoslovi dostoyanie Tvoyo.
Spasi, Gospodi, liudi Tvoya, i blagoslovi dostoyanye Tvoyo,
Na soprotivnyya daruya.
I Tvoe sokhraniaya,
Krestom Tvoim zhitelstvo.

== Performance practice ==
In a live performance, the logistics of safety and precision in placement of the shots require either well-drilled military crews using modern cannons, or the use of sixteen pieces of muzzle-loading artillery, since any reloading schemes, to attain the sixteen shots, or even a semblance of them, in the two-minute time span involved, makes safety and precision impossible with 1800s artillery. Time lag alone precludes implementation of cues for the shots for fewer than sixteen 1812-era field pieces.

== Performance history ==
Shortlist of performances of Tchaikovsky's 1812 Overture during and shortly after his life.

- Berlin, German Empire: December 1882, conducted by Benjamin Bilse at Konzerthaus Berlin
- Smolensk, Russian Empire: 2 June 1885, conducted by Mily Balakirev
- Saint Petersburg, Russian Empire: 17 March 1887, conducted by Tchaikovsky himself
- Moscow, Russian Empire: 26 November 1887, conducted by Tchaikovsky himself
- Moscow, Russian Empire: 27 November 1887, conducted by Tchaikovsky himself
- Berlin, German Empire: 8 February 1888, conducted by Tchaikovsky himself
- Prague, Austria-Hungary: 19 February 1888, conducted by Tchaikovsky himself at Rudolfinum
- Prague, Austria-Hungary: 21 February 1888, conducted by Tchaikovsky himself at National Theatre
- Amsterdam, Netherlands: 29 November 1888, conducted by Willem Kes
- Prague, Austria-Hungary: 30 November 1888, conducted by Tchaikovsky himself at National Theatre
- London, Great Britain: 15 January 1889, conducted by George Henschel
- Pavlovsk, Russian Empire: 18 May 1890, conducted by Julius Laube
- Tiflis, Russian Empire: 1 November 1890, conducted by Tchaikovsky himself
- Odessa, Russian Empire: 2 December 1891, conducted by Anton Arensky
- Kiev, Russian Empire: 2 January 1892, conducted by Tchaikovsky himself
- Kiev, Russian Empire: 3 January 1892, conducted by Tchaikovsky himself
- Brussels, Belgium: 14 January 1893, conducted by Tchaikovsky himself
- Odessa, Russian Empire: 4 February 1893, conducted by Tchaikovsky himself
- Kharkov, Russian Empire: 26 March 1893, conducted by Tchaikovsky himself
- Boston, United States: 29 December 1893, conducted by Emil Paur at Boston Music Hall
- Vienna, Austria-Hungary: 15 January 1899, conducted by Gustav Mahler

== Recording history ==
1812 Overture
Performed by the Skidmore College Orchestra

The earliest traceable orchestral recording, which does not include the shots and features no percussion apart from bells, was by the Royal Albert Hall Orchestra conducted by Landon Ronald, and issued by His Master's Voice on three 12-inch 78-rpm sides in 1916. A Royal Opera Orchestra recording of about the same time similarly contains no shots at all.

Antal Doráti's 1954 Mercury Records recording with the Minneapolis Symphony Orchestra, partially recorded at West Point, and using the Yale Memorial Carillon in New Haven, Connecticut, uses a Napoleonic French single muzzleloading cannon shot dubbed in 16 times as written. On the first edition of the recording, one side played the Overture and the other side played a narrative by Deems Taylor about how the cannon and bell effects were accomplished. (Later editions placed the commentary after the performance on side 1 and the Capriccio Italien on side 2.) A stereophonic version was recorded on 5 April 1958, using the bells of the Laura Spelman Rockefeller Memorial Carillon, at Riverside Church. On this Mercury Living Presence Stereo recording, the spoken commentary was also given by Deems Taylor and the 1812 was coupled with Tchaikovsky's Capriccio Italien. Later editions coupled the 1812 Overture with Dorati's recording of Beethoven's Wellington's Victory, which featured the London Symphony Orchestra and real cannon.

The Black Dyke Band has recorded a brass band arrangement of the piece. This recording on their album Symphonic Brass includes the cannon shots as originally written.

The Berlin Philharmonic Orchestra conducted by Herbert Von Karajan, and the Don Cossacks Choir recorded the piece in 1967 for Deutsche Grammophon.

In 1971, CBS released a recording with the Philadelphia Orchestra conducted by Eugene Ormandy, also featuring the Mormon Tabernacle Choir, the Valley Forge Military Academy band and real artillery shots. This was actually an overdubbed version - with the choir at the start replacing the instumental overture, and the addition of brass, church bells and cannon fire - of the original 1959 CBS Masterworks LP release. British rock drummer Cozy Powell sampled the overture at the end of the track "Over The Top" in his eponymous 1979 studio album.

The first digital recording occurred in 1979 by Telarc with the Cincinnati Symphony Orchestra headlining under the leadership of Erich Kunzel. The Kiev Symphony Chorus was secured and brought stateside for the express purpose of this recording, while the Children's Choir of Greater Cincinnati (presently doing business as the Cincinnati Youth Choir), a regular Symphony and Pops collaborator to this day, supplied the children's voices. The recording features the tones of the Emery Memorial Carillon (in adjacent Mariemont, Ohio) alongside high-definition cannon shots using full-sized 19th century military cannons, also specially recorded locally. In addition to becoming Telarc's best-selling record and helping to establish them as a company, the record soon became a popular and well-known method for testing hifi record-playing equipment and related setups. Only the best and most fine-tuned allowed the cannon shots to be played properly (an accompanying warning for users not to destroy their audio equipment was included with the record).

In 1989, the Swingle Singers recorded an a cappella version of the overture as part of an album whose title is 1812.

In 1990, during a worldwide celebration of the 150th anniversary of Tchaikovsky's birth, the Overture was recorded in the city of his youth by the Leningrad Philharmonic Orchestra using 16 muzzleloading cannons fired live as written in the 1880 score. That recording was done within earshot of the composer's grave. The festival was televised for the first time in the United States on 9 March 1991.

The Texan band "The Invincible Czars" released a rock version of 1812 Overture for the bicentennial of the Battle of Borodino in September 2012. The band had already debuted their arrangement of the piece at the 20th annual OK Mozart classical music festival at Bartlesville, Oklahoma, with professional orchestra musicians, in June 2009, complete with fireworks at the finale.
