= Bogomir Korsov =

Russian baritone opera singer

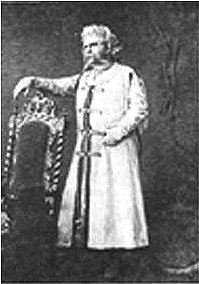
Bogomir Korsov as Mazeppa, Bolshoi Theatre, Moscow, 1884

Bogomir Bogomirovich Korsov (also known as Gotfrid Gotfridovich Korsov, real name Gottfried Goehring) (3 March 1843 in St Petersburg – 1920 in Tbilisi) was a Russian baritone opera singer.

Korsov studied first at St. Petersburg College and then architecture at the Academy of Fine Arts, graduating in 1864. He studied singing in St. Petersburg with Luigi Piccioli and then in Milan with Giovanni Corsi (hence his stage surname). He made his debut at the Turin Theatre.

In 1869 he was accepted at the Imperial Opera in St Petersburg. During the same period, he sang periodically at the Bolshoi Theatre in Moscow, and moved on to perform there regularly in 1882. Korsov left the opera stage in 1905.

Korsov's wife was a famous singer (contralto) Kroutikova, Alexandra Pavlovna and his daughter Lucette Korsoff was a coloratura soprano based in France and Belgium.

Among his roles were:

- Rigoletto in Rigoletto (Giuseppe Verdi)
- Iago in Otello (Verdi)
- Germont in La traviata (Verdi)
- Boris in Boris Godunov (Modest Mussorgsky)
- Peter in The Power of the Fiend (Alexander Serov)
- The title role in Mazeppa (Pyotr Ilyich Tchaikovsky, 1884)
- Devil in Cherevichki (Tchaikovsky, 1887)
- Demon in The Demon (Anton Rubinstein)
- Mizgir in The Snow Maiden (Nikolai Rimsky-Korsakov)
- created the title role in Aleko (Sergei Rachmaninoff, 1893).

== Bibliography ==
[Russian Musical Newspaper] "Русская Музыкальная Газета", 1905, № 3 - 4.
