= Mazeppa (poem) =

Narrative poem by Lord Byron

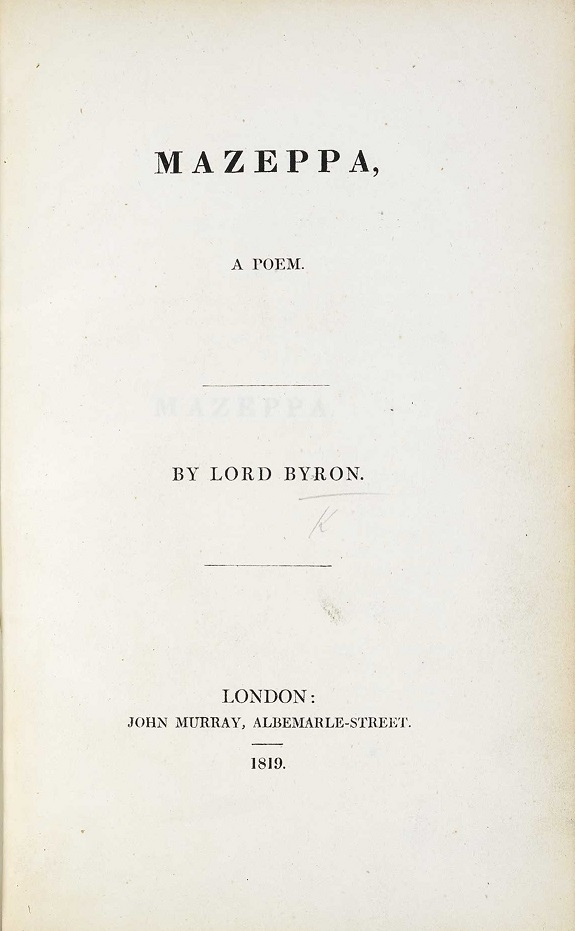
- Author: Lord Byron
- Language: English
- Subject: Ivan Mazepa
- Genre: Narrative poem, Romanticism
- Publisher: John Murray
- Publication date: 1819
- Publication place: United Kingdom
- Pages: 71
- Text: Mazeppa at Wikisource

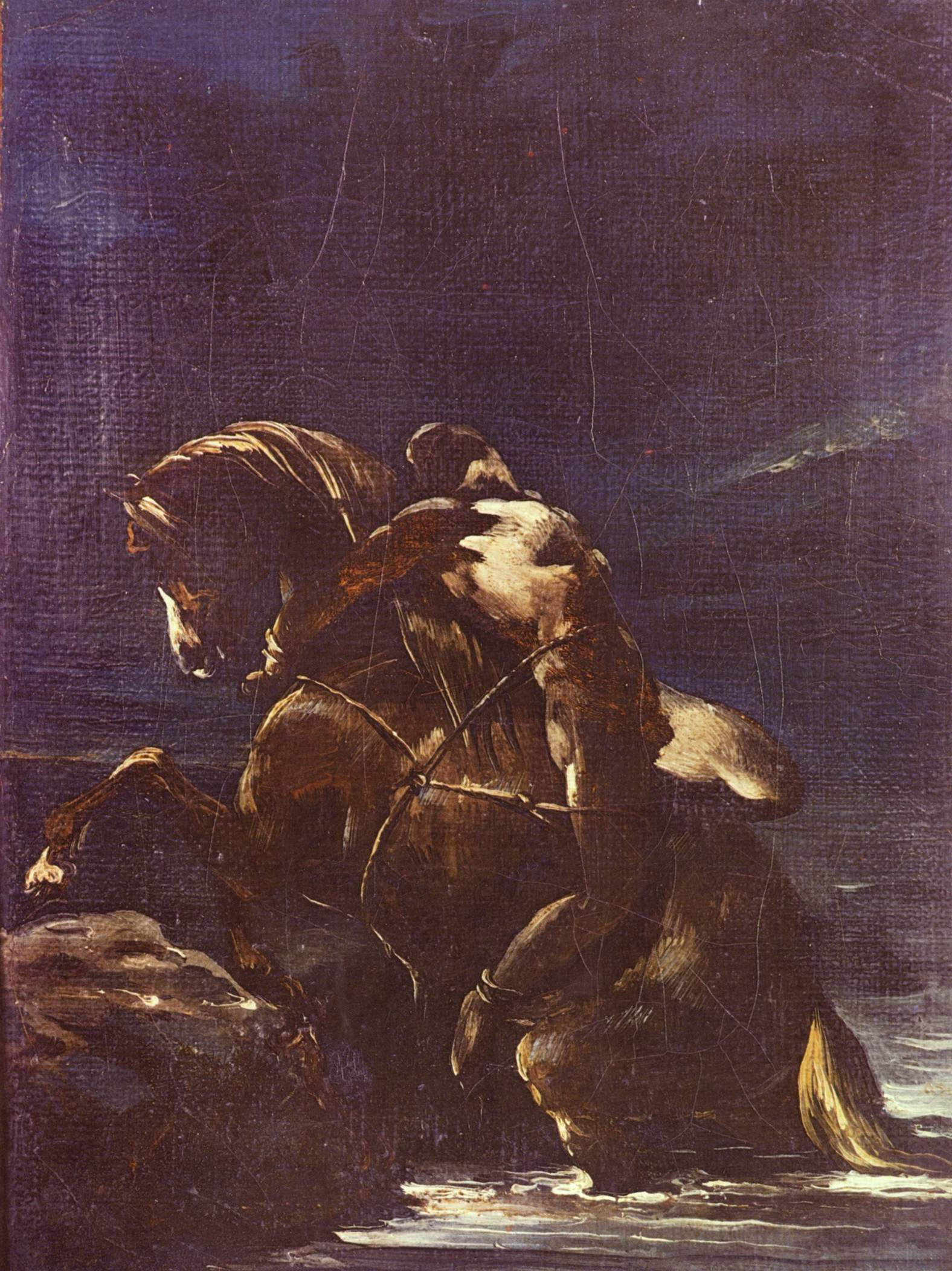
Mazeppa, by Théodore Géricault, c. 1823, based on Byron's poem.

Mazeppa is a narrative poem written by the English Romantic poet Lord Byron in 1819. It is based on a popular legend about the early life of Ivan Mazepa (1639–1709), who later became Hetman (military leader) of Ukraine. (Note: Mazeppa is a historical spelling; in modern documents the historical figure is referred to as Ivan Mazepa. However, reprints of Byron's poem keep the spelling Mazeppa. This article uses the "Mazeppa" spelling when referring to the hero of the poem, and reserves "Mazepa" for references to the actual historical personage.) Byron's poem was immediately translated into French, where it inspired a series of works in various art forms. The cultural legacy of Mazeppa was revitalised with the independence of Ukraine in 1991.

According to the poem, the young Mazeppa has a love affair with a Polish Countess, Theresa, while serving as a page at the Court of King John II Casimir Vasa. Countess Theresa was married to a much older Count. On discovering the affair, the Count punishes Mazeppa by tying him naked to a wild horse and setting the horse loose. The bulk of the poem describes the traumatic journey of the hero strapped to the horse. The poem has been praised for its "vigor of style and its sharp realization of the feelings of suffering and endurance".

Published within the same covers as Mazeppa was a short "Fragment of a Novel", one of the earliest vampire stories in English, and the poem "Ode".

== Overview ==
The poem opens with a framing device: Ukrainian Hetman Mazeppa and the Swedish King Charles XII, together with their armies, are retreating from the Battle of Poltava, where they were defeated by the Russian Empire's forces. Exhausted and war-weary, the two men set up camp for the night (Stanzas 1–2). The King admires Mazeppa's horsemanship, and Mazeppa offers to tell him how he learnt this skill (Stanza 4). The poem then switches to the first person. Mazeppa describes his youth and his service as a page to King John II Casimir in Poland (Stanza 4). He becomes acquainted with Theresa, a beautiful Orientalized woman who "had the Asiatic eye" (l. 208). She is married to a Count who is thirty years her senior (l. 155). Mazeppa falls passionately in love with her (l. 266–7), is unable to control his passions (l. 290–295), and they meet at night and consummate their love (l. 298–300).

However, the Count's men catch them together (l. 325–6) and bring him to the Count. The Count orders an unusually cruel punishment: Mazeppa is to be tied naked to a steed, which is then to be taunted and set loose (Stanza 9). Stanzas 10 to 18 recount the steed's flight across Eastern Europe, emphasising the pain, suffering and confusion that Mazeppa feels. However, the horse has seemingly limitless energy. Mazeppa nearly dies twice. In Stanza 13, he describes himself "full in death's face" (l. 557), but is restored when the horse swims through a river. Stanza 18 concludes with a description of "an icy sickness" and his vision of a raven flying overheard, ready to feast on his corpse. However, in Stanza 19, Mazeppa awakes to find himself in bed, with his wounds being tended by a "Cossack Maid" (l. 817). In the final stanza, Mazeppa's narrative ends. The poet-narrator describes Mazeppa preparing his bed for the evening. The King "had been an hour asleep" (l. 867–880).

== Sources and inspiration ==
There are historical sources which verify that Ivan Mazepa served in the Polish Court to John II Casimir. However, it is unclear why he left Poland in 1663 and returned to his homeland Ukraine. There is no historical evidence to support that Mazepa was exiled from Poland because of a love affair, or that he was punished by being strapped to a wild horse.

However, this colorful legend was in circulation before Byron published his poem. Voltaire repeats it in History of Charles XII, King of Sweden (1731). This appears to have been Byron's main source for his poem: his "Advertisement" to the poem includes three long quotations from this work. Several critics have also speculated that Byron was familiar with the Mémoires d'Azéma (1764) by the French writer André Guillaume Contant Dorville, as there are significant similarities between the plot of that novel and of Byron's poem.

Byron's references to Mazepa's participation in the Great Northern War alongside Charles XII, and their eventual defeat, are historically accurate.

== Analysis ==
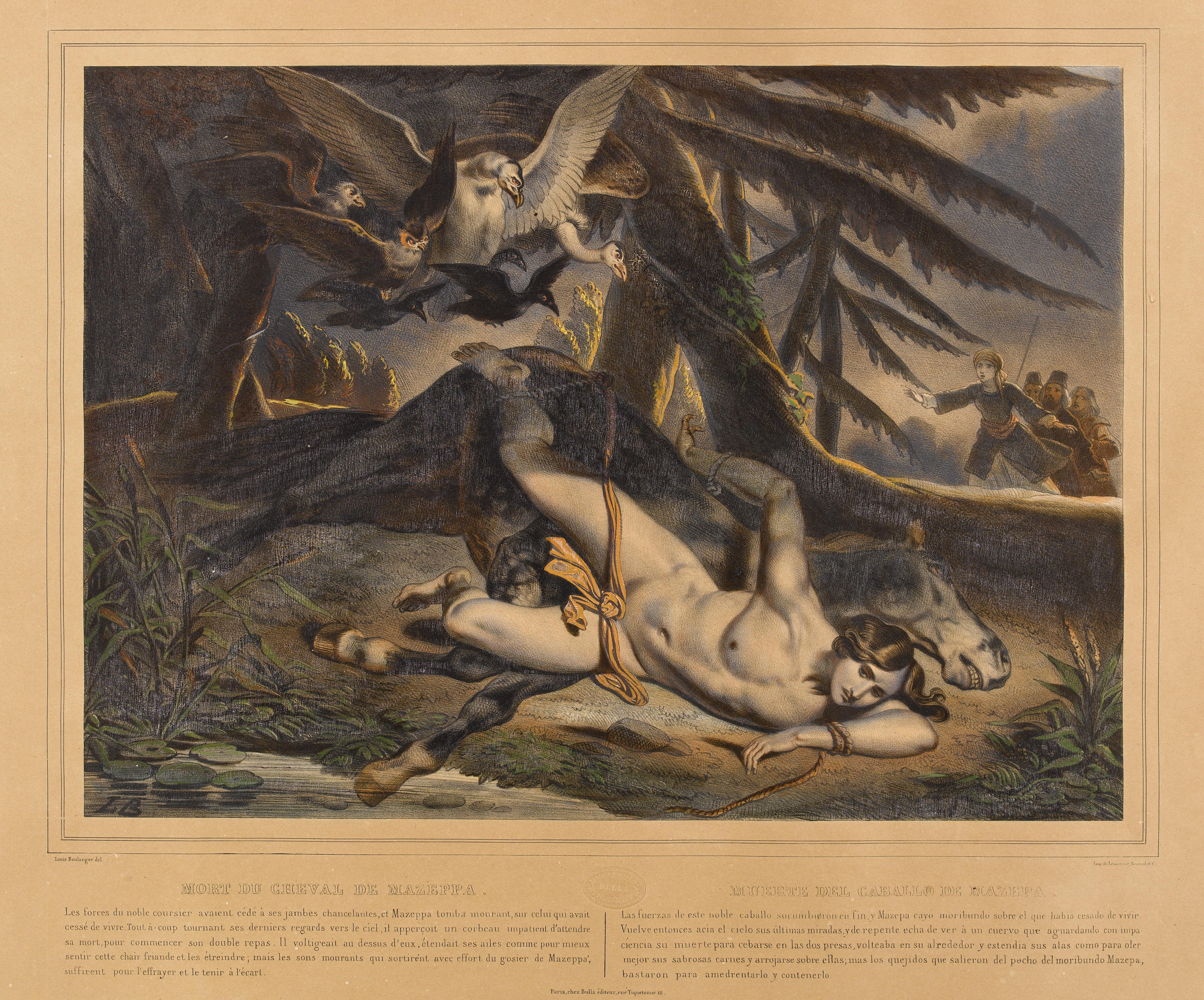
Louis Boulanger, The Death of Mazeppa's Horse 1839.

Many critics see Mazeppa as a transitional work in Byron's œuvre. Its dates of composition (1818–1819) place it between the earlier Eastern tales such as The Prisoner of Chillon (1817), which describe agonised, maudlin Byronic heroes and the later satirical, ironic Don Juan (1818–19). Leslie Marchand argues that Mazeppa is a partly unsuccessful work, as it is torn between high emotion and lighter irony. Mark Phillipson also sees Mazeppa as a transitional work of a "mongrel genre, the historical verse-romance". He argues that the poem is characterised by "moral ambivalence", and it remains unclear whether Mazeppa is a sympathetic hero or not.

The question of whether the audience is expected to sympathise with Mazeppa has long been a subject for critical discussion. W. H. Marshall (1961) argues that Mazeppa is entirely unsympathetic: a "garrulous and egoistic old man" who never atones for his crime and whose hackneyed description of his passion for Teresa "becomes tedious at once". Jerome McGann (1968) takes the opposite view, arguing that Mazeppa's "wild ride" acts as an initiation process which makes him into a mature hero who is able to restrain his passions, unlike King Charles. He compares Mazeppa to Meursault, the existentialist hero of Albert Camus' novel The Stranger (1942).

Hubert Babinski (1974) also offers a sympathetic reading of the character Mazeppa, pointing out his kindness to Charles and the horses in the opening and closing chapter. Babinski suggests that the hero Mazeppa is "one of Byron's most realistic creations, heroic within the bounds of human potential" and that he is a "fine specimen of a man". He further argues that Mazeppa's death-in-life experiences during his "wild ride" are central to the poem's meaning and symbolic of the possibilities of human transformation and rebirth. He argues that the French painters who took up the Mazeppa theme further developed this idea.

More recent interpretations have attempted to apply the insights of critical theory to the poem. Zbigniew Bialas (1999) offers a Saidian postcolonial reading, suggesting that Byron orientalises Eastern Europe and attempts to stamp an identity on Mazeppa, who nonetheless evades fixed national and political identities. Jane Stabler (2004) reads the poem through the prism of postmodern theory, arguing that Mazeppa "draws attention to the fictive contours of history". More recently, Thomas McLean (2012) considers Mazeppa "Byron's Polish poem" in light of the British fascination with Tadeusz Kościuszko and sees Mazeppa as an empowering figure for Europe's other smaller nations.

== Literary significance and reception ==
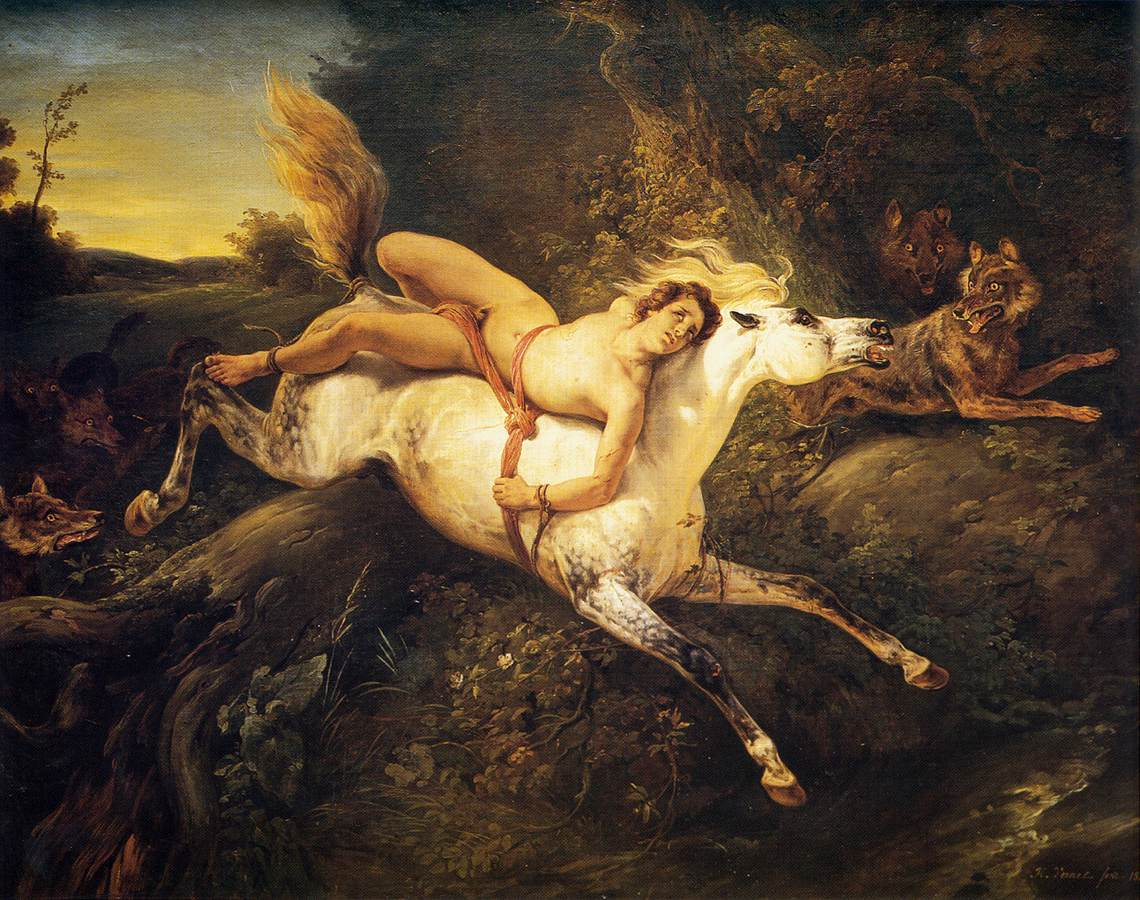
Mazeppa and the Wolves, by Horace Vernet, 1826 (Calvet Museum, Avignon)

Babinski points out that although Mazeppa received a flurry of reviews upon publication, later critics of Byron have rarely addressed the poem. Certainly there is less scholarship on Mazeppa than on many of Byron's other narrative poems, and Mazeppa does not appear in Byron texts such as the 1978 Norton critical edition.

However, Byron's poem was both popular and influential in the Romantic period. It was immediately translated into French, and was a source for French Romantic painters. Plays, equestrian circus performances, musical works, novels, more poems, various visual representations, and eventually films followed, some drawing directly on Byron's work, others via intermediary works by for example Liszt, Hugo or Pushkin.

== Publication history ==
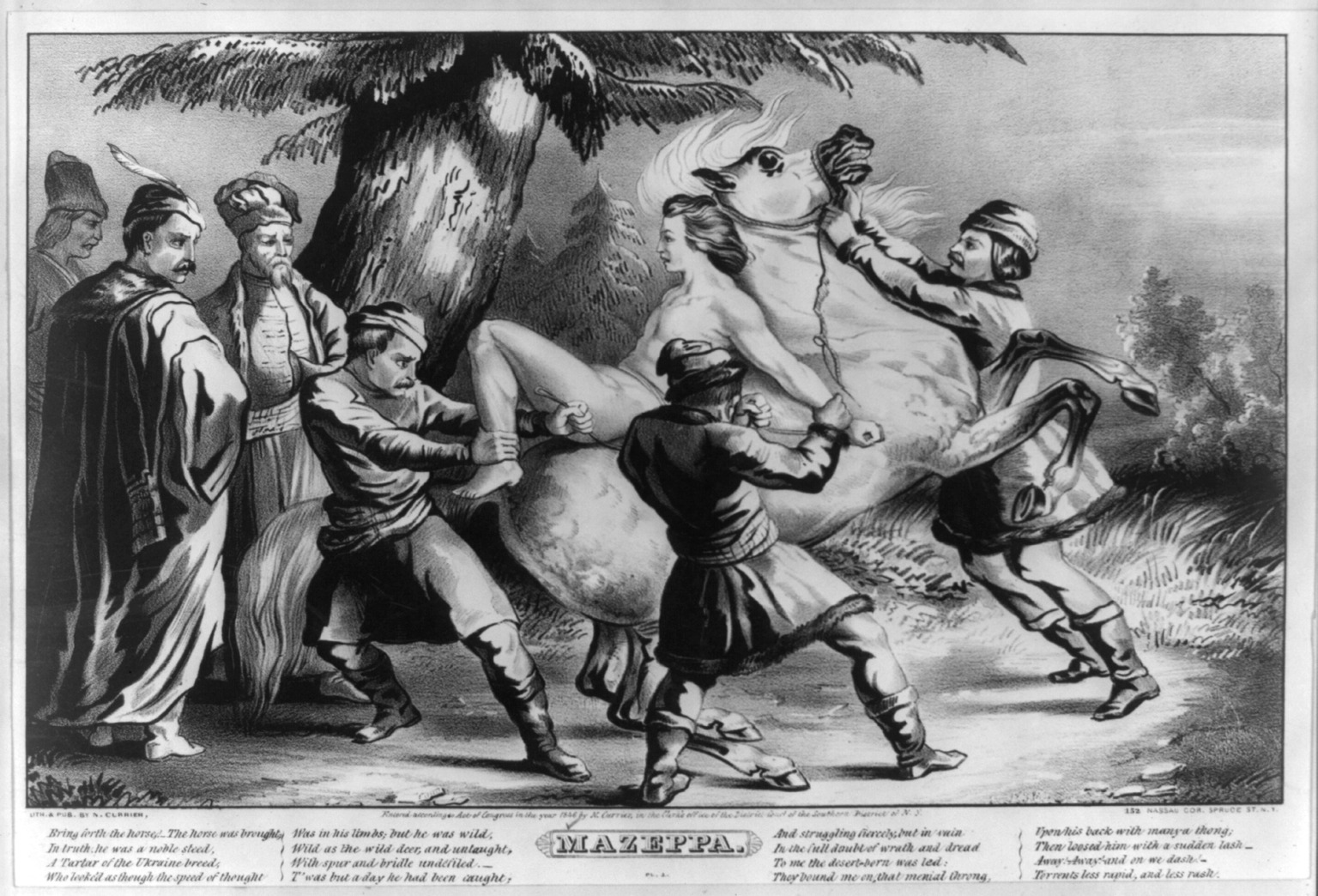
Illustration to the 1846 Currier and Ives printing of the poem

Byron began writing Mazeppa on 2 April 1817 and completed it on 26 September 1818. It was first published by John Murray on 28 June 1819, alongside Byron's "Ode to Venice" as "Ode" and a short prose fragment, "A Fragment", one of the earliest vampire tales in English literature. (Note: Full publication history is available in Byron, George (1986). McGann, Jerome (ed.). The complete poetical works. Oxford: Clarendon Press. p. 493.)
