= List of Russian opera singers =

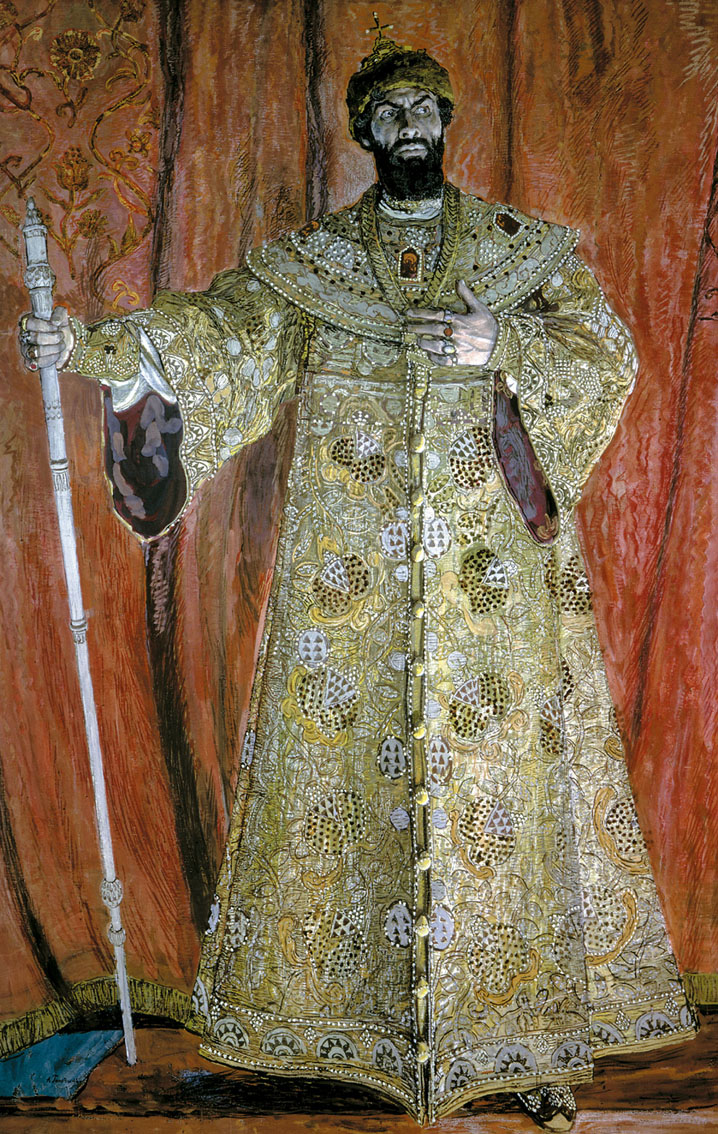
Feodor Chaliapin as Boris Godunov in the opera of the same name by Modest Mussorgsky

This is a list of opera singers from Russian Federation, Soviet Union and Russian Empire including both ethnic Russians and people of other ethnicities. This list includes those, who were born in the Russian Federation/Soviet Union/Russian Empire but later emigrated, and those, who were born elsewhere but immigrated to the country and performed there for a long time.

Opera came to Russia in the 18th century. At first there were mostly Italian language operas presented by Italian opera troupes. Later some foreign composers serving to the Russian Imperial Court began to write Russian-language operas, while some Russian composers were involved into writing of the operas in Italian and French. Only at the beginning of the 1770s the first modest attempts of the composers of Russian origin to compose operas to the Russian librettos were made. The 19th century was the golden age of Russian opera, with such prominent composers as Mikhail Glinka, Alexander Dargomyzhsky, Modest Mussorgsky, Pyotr Tchaikovsky, Alexander Borodin and Nikolai Rimsky-Korsakov. Their traditions were carried on to the 20th century by Igor Stravinsky, Sergei Rachmaninoff, Sergei Prokofiev and Dmitri Shostakovich. Bolshoi and Mariinsky theatres continue to be the main opera and ballet scenes of Russia and one of the most prominent in the world.

A number of Russian opera singers rose to fame already in the 18th century, but it was the late 19th and the 20th centuries that saw the appearance of many world-renown, well-remembered and still popular soloists, including Leonid Sobinov, Galina Vishnevskaya and, of course, Feodor Chaliapin, the greatest bass of all time. Contemporary Russia is represented at the world scene with such singers as Dmitri Hvorostovsky, Anna Netrebko and Alexander Anisimov.

== Alphabetical list ==
=== A ===
Portrait	Person	Details	Stage image
	Ildar Abdrazakov		
	Ğäziz Älmöxämmädev		
	Alexander Anisimov		
	Irina Arkhipova		
	Olga Averino		
	Arnold Azrikan		

=== B ===
Portrait	Person	Details	Stage image
	Nikolay Baskov		
	Olga Borodina		

=== C ===
Portrait	Person	Details	Stage image
	Feodor Chaliapin (1873–1938); Russian Empire; France bass	The most famous Russian opera singer of the 20th century. The possessor of a large and expressive bass voice, he is often credited with establishing the tradition of naturalistic acting in his chosen art form. Mephistopheles in Gounod's Faust, Mussorgsky's Boris Godunov, Boito's Mefistofele, Ivan the Terrible in Rimsky-Korsakov's The Maid of Pskov, Massenet's Don Quichotte, Philip II in Verdi's Don Carlos, Glinka's Ivan Susanin, Khan Konchak in Borodin's Prince Igor	Chaliapin as Boito's Mefistofele, 1916

=== D ===
Portrait	Person	Details	Stage image
	Dilyara Idrisova		

=== F ===
Portrait	Person	Details	Stage image
	Nikolay and Medea Figner		

=== G ===
Portrait	Person	Details	Stage image
	Hibla Gerzmava		
	Yuri Aleksandrovich Gulyayev		

=== H ===
Portrait	Person	Details	Stage image
	Dmitri Hvorostovsky		
	Helena Holl		

=== K ===
Portrait	Person	Details	Stage image
	Victoria Karasyova	Ended her career in 2009 due to health problems	
	Ljubov Kazarnovskaya		
	Alisa Kolosova		
	Bogomir Korsov		
	Praskovia Kovalyova-Zhemchugova		
	Ivan Kozlovsky		
	Maria Nikolaevna Kuznetsova		

=== L ===
Portrait	Person	Details	Stage image
	Sergej Larin		
	Yelizaveta Lavrovskaya		
	Sergei Lemeshev		
	Julia Lezhneva		

=== M ===
Portrait	Person	Details	Stage image
	Gavrilo Martsenkovich		
	Artyom Melikhov		
	Ivan Melnikov		

=== N ===
Portrait	Person	Details	Stage image
	Yevgeny Nesterenko		
	Anna Netrebko		
	Antonina Nezhdanova		

=== O ===
Portrait	Person	Details	Stage image
	Elena Obraztsova		

=== P ===
Portrait	Person	Details	Stage image
	Osip Petrov		
	Vyacheslav Polozov		
	Marina Poplavskaya		

=== R ===
Portrait	Person	Details	Stage image
	Mark Reizen		
	Nadezhda Repina		
	Vladimir Rosing		

=== S ===
Portrait	Person	Details	Stage image
	Sara Sadíqova		
	Boris Shtokolov		
	Tamara Sinyavskaya		
	Leonid Sobinov		
	Pyotr Slovtsov		
	Fyodor Stravinsky		

=== V ===
Portrait	Person	Details	Stage image
	Georgi Pavlovich Vinogradov		
	Galina Vishnevskaya		

=== Y ===
Portrait	Person	Details	Stage image
	Ivan Yershov		
	Sergei Yudin		

=== Z ===
Portrait	Person	Details	Stage image
	Nadezhda Zabela-Vrubel		
	Elena Zoubareva		
