= Eugene Onegin (opera) =

1879 opera by Pyotr Ilyich Tchaikovsky

- Opera by P. I. Tchaikovsky
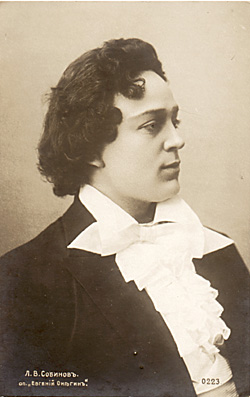
- Leonid Sobinov as Vladimir Lensky, 1898
- Description: lyrical scenes
- Native title: Russian: Евгений Онегин
- Librettist: Pyotr Ilyich Tchaikovsky; Konstantin Shilovsky
- Language: Russian
- Based on: Eugene Onegin by Alexander Pushkin
- Premiere: 29 March 1879; Maly Theatre, Moscow

Eugene Onegin (Russian: Евгений Онегин, romanized: Yevgény Onégin, IPA: [jɪvˈɡʲenʲɪj ɐˈnʲeɡʲɪn]), Op. 24, is an opera (designated as "lyrical scenes") in 3 acts (7 scenes), composed by Pyotr Ilyich Tchaikovsky. The libretto, organised by the composer himself, very closely follows certain passages in Alexander Pushkin's 1825–1832 novel in verse, retaining much of his poetry. Tchaikovsky's friend Konstantin Shilovsky contributed M. Triquet's verses in Act 2, Scene 1, while Tchaikovsky himself arranged the text for Lensky's arioso in Act 1, Scene 1, and almost all of Prince Gremin's aria in Act 3, Scene 1.

Eugene Onegin is a well-known example of lyric opera, to which Tchaikovsky added music of a dramatic nature. The story concerns a selfish hero who lives to regret his blasé rejection of a young woman's love and his careless incitement of a fatal duel with his best friend.

The opera was first performed in Moscow in 1879. There are several recordings of it, and it is regularly performed. The work's title refers to the protagonist.

== Composition history ==
In May 1877, the opera singer Yelizaveta Lavrovskaya spoke to Tchaikovsky about creating an opera based on the plot of Alexander Pushkin's 1825–1832 verse novel Eugene Onegin. Tchaikovsky felt that the novel wasn't particularly strong in plot – a dandy rejects a young country girl, she successfully grows into a worldly woman, he tries to seduce her but it is too late. The strength of the novel resided in its character development and social commentary, as well as in the beauty of its literary delivery. Soon after a sleepless night, Tchaikovsky came to embrace the idea. He created the scenarios in one night before starting the composition of the music.

Tchaikovsky, with some minor involvement by Konstantin Shilovsky, used original verses from Pushkin's novel and chose scenes that involved the emotional world and fortunes of his heroes, calling the opera "lyrical scenes." The opera is episodic; there is no continuous story, just selected highlights of Onegin's life. The composer finished the opera by January 1878.

== Performance history ==
Tchaikovsky worried whether the public would accept his opera, which lacked traditional scene changes. He believed that its performance required maximum simplicity and sincerity. With this in mind, he entrusted the first production to the students of the Moscow Conservatory. The premiere took place on 29 March (17 March O.S.) 1879 at the Maly Theatre, Moscow, conducted by Nikolai Rubinstein, with set designs by Karl Valts (Waltz). Whatever misgivings Tchaikovsky had, over the next century the public embraced the opera and it is frequently performed all over the world.

Two years later the first performance at the Bolshoi Theatre in Moscow took place on 23 January (11 January O.S.) 1881 with conductor Eduard Nápravník.

Outside Russia the initial reception was lukewarm, and it was slow to reach European cities, being seen as a Russian curiosity. The first performance outside Russia took place on 6 December 1888 in Prague, conducted by Tchaikovsky himself, although the rehearsals had been the responsibility of Adolf Čech. It was sung in Czech and translated by Marie Červinková-Riegrová.

The first performance in Hamburg, on 19 January 1892, was conducted by Gustav Mahler, in the composer's presence. Tchaikovsky was applauded after each scene and received curtain calls at the end. He attributed its success to Mahler, whom he described as "not some average sort, but simply a genius burning with a desire to conduct".

The first performance in England took place on 17 October 1892 at the Olympic Theatre in London with Henry J. Wood conducting and Eugène Oudin in the title role. Fanny Moody sang Tatyana. This performance was sung in English, to a text translated by Henry Sutherland Edwards.

Vienna first saw Eugene Onegin on 19 November 1897, conducted by Gustav Mahler.

The United States premiere was given on 24 March 1920 at the Metropolitan Opera in New York City. The opera was sung in Italian. The first Russian performance by the Metropolitan Opera was on 15 October 1977.

== Roles ==
Role	Voice type	Moscow premiere, 29 March 1879 (Conductor: Nikolai Rubinstein)	Bolshoi Theatre premiere, 23 January 1881 (Conductor: Eduard Nápravník)
Larina, lady of the manor	mezzo-soprano		
Tatyana, her daughter	soprano	Mariya Klimentova	Yelena Verni
Olga, Tatyana's sister	contralto	Aleksandra Levitskaya	Aleksandra Krutikova
Filipyevna, a nanny	mezzo-soprano		
Vladimir Lensky	tenor	Mikhail Medvedyev	Dmitri Usatov
Eugene Onegin	baritone	Sergey Gilyov	Pavel Khokhlov
Prince Gremin	bass	Vasiliy Makhalov	Abram Abramov
Company Commander	bass		
Zaretsky	bass		
Triquet, a Frenchman	tenor		
Guillot, Onegin's valet	silent		
Chorus, silent roles: Peasants, peasant women, ballroom guests, landowners and ladies of the manor, officers.

== Instrumentation ==
Source: Tchaikovsky Research

- Woodwinds: Piccolo, 2 Flutes, 2 Oboes, 2 Clarinets (A, B-flat), 2 Bassoons
- Brass: 4 Horns (F), 2 Trumpets (F), 3 Trombones
- Strings: Violins I, Violins II, Violas, Cellos, Double Basses, Harp
- Percussion: Timpani

== Synopsis ==
Time: The 1820s

Place: St Petersburg and surrounding countryside

=== Act 1 ===
Scene 1: The garden of the Larin country estate

Madame Larina and the nurse Filipyevna are sitting outside in the garden. They can hear Madame Larina's two daughters, Tatyana and her younger sister Olga, singing a love song. Madame Larina begins to reminisce about her own courtship and marriage. A group of peasants enter, and celebrate the harvest with songs and dances. Tatyana and Olga watch. Tatyana has been reading a romantic novel and is absorbed by the story; her carefree sister, on the other hand, wants to join in the celebrations. Madame Larina tells Tatyana that real life is very different from her novels. Filipyevna announces that visitors have arrived: Olga's fiancé Lensky, a young poet, and his friend Eugene Onegin, visiting the area from St Petersburg. The pair are shown in and Lensky introduces Onegin to the Larin family. Onegin is initially surprised that Lensky has chosen the extrovert Olga rather than her more subtle elder sister as his fiancée. Tatyana for her part is immediately and strongly attracted to Onegin. Lensky expresses his delight at seeing Olga and she responds flirtatiously. Onegin tells Tatyana of his boredom in the country and describes the death of his uncle and his subsequent inheritance of a nearby estate. Filipyevna recognizes that Onegin has had a profound effect on Tatyana.

Scene 2: Tatyana's room

Tatyana is dressed for bed. Restless and unable to sleep, she asks her nurse Filipyevna to tell her about her youth and early marriage. Tatyana confesses that she is in love. Left alone, Tatyana pours out her feelings in a letter to Onegin. She tells him that she loves him and believes that she will never feel this way about anyone else, and begs him to understand and help her. She finishes writing the letter at dawn. A shepherd's pipe is heard in the distance. Filipyevna enters the room to wake Tatyana. Tatyana persuades her to send her grandson to deliver the letter to Onegin.

Scene 3: Another part of the estate

Servant girls pick fruit and sing as they work. Tatyana waits anxiously for Onegin's arrival. Onegin enters to see Tatyana and give her his answer to her letter. He explains, not unkindly, that he is not a man who loves easily and is unsuited to marriage. He is unworthy of her love and can only offer her brotherly affection. He warns Tatyana to be less emotionally open in the future. The voices of the servant girls singing are heard again. Tatyana is crushed and unable to reply.

=== Act 2 ===
Scene 1: The ballroom of the Larin house

A ball is being given in honour of Tatyana, whose name day it is. Onegin is dancing with her. He grows irritated with a group of neighbours who gossip about him and Tatyana, and with Lensky for persuading him to come to the ball. He decides to avenge himself by dancing and flirting with Olga. Lensky is astounded and becomes extremely jealous. He confronts Olga but she cannot see that she has done anything wrong and tells Lensky not to be ridiculous. Onegin asks Olga to dance with him again and she agrees, as "punishment" for Lensky's jealousy. The elderly French tutor Monsieur Triquet sings some couplets in honour of Tatyana (Sung in French in the opera with different lyrics, this tune takes up that of the romance (for one or two voices) "Dormez donc mes chères amours", directly taken from the vaudeville La Somnambule (libretto by Scribe and Delavigne - 1819) with music by Amédée de Beauplan, whose first lyrics are: "Reposons-nous ici tous deux " in G major); after which the quarrel between Lensky and Onegin becomes more intense. Lensky renounces his friendship with Onegin in front of all the guests, and challenges Onegin to a duel, which the latter is forced, with many misgivings, to accept. Tatyana collapses and the ball ends in confusion.

Scene 2: On the banks of a wooded stream, early morning

Lensky is waiting for Onegin with his second Zaretsky. Lensky reflects on his life, his fear of death and his love for Olga. Onegin arrives with his manservant Guillot. Both Lensky and Onegin are reluctant to go ahead with the duel, reflecting on the senselessness of their sudden enmity. But it is too late; neither man has the courage to stop the duel. Zaretsky gives them the signal and Onegin shoots Lensky dead.

=== Act 3 ===
Scene 1: The house of a rich nobleman in St Petersburg

Five years have passed, during which Onegin has travelled extensively around Europe. Standing alone at a ball, he reflects on the emptiness of his life and his remorse over the death of Lensky. Prince Gremin enters with Tatyana, his wife, now a grand, aristocratic beauty. She is greeted by many of the guests with great deference. Onegin is taken aback when he sees Tatyana, and deeply impressed by her beauty and noble bearing. Tatyana, in turn, is overwhelmed with emotion when she recognizes him, but tries to suppress it. Gremin tells Onegin about his great happiness and love for Tatyana, and re-introduces Onegin to his wife. Onegin, suddenly injected with new life, realizes that he is in love with Tatyana. He determines to write to her and arrange a meeting.

Scene 2: A room in Prince Gremin's house

Tatyana has received Onegin's letter, which has stirred up the passion she felt for him as a young girl and disturbed her. Onegin enters. Tatyana recalls her earlier feelings and asks why Onegin is pursuing her now. Is it because of her social position? Onegin denies any cynical motivation: his passion is real and overwhelming. Tatyana, moved to tears, reflects how near they once were to happiness but nevertheless asks him to leave. He asks her to have pity. Tatyana admits she still loves Onegin, but asserts that their union can never be realized, as she is now married, and determined to remain faithful to her husband despite her true feelings. Onegin implores her to relent, but she bids him farewell forever, leaving him alone and in despair.

== Principal arias and numbers ==
Act 1

Aria: "Have you not heard?" (Tatyana)
Aria: "Ah, Tanya, Tanya" (Olga)
Aria: "How happy, how happy I am!" (Lensky)
Aria: Letter Aria "Let me die, but first...", Сцена письма: «Пускай погибну я, но прежде...» (Tatyana)
Aria: "Kogda by zhizn' domashnim krugom" (Onegin)

Act 2

Dance: Waltz
Dance: Mazurka
Aria: "Where have you gone, O golden days of my spring?" ("Kuda, kuda vy udalilis'") «Куда, куда вы удалились, весны моей златые дни» (Lensky)

Act 3

Dance: Polonaise
Aria: "Love knows no age" «Любви все возрасты покорны» (Gremin)
Scene: Finale (Onegin, Tatyana)

== Structure ==
Source: Tchaikovsky Research

Introduction

Act 1

No.1 – Duet & Quartet
No.2 – Chorus & Peasants' Dance
No.3 – Scene & Olga's Aria
No.4 – Scene
No.5 – Scene & Quartet
No.6 – Scene
No.6a – Lensky's Aria
No.7 – Closing Scene
No.8 – Introduction & Scene with the Nurse
No.9 – Letter Scene
No.10 – Scene & Duet
No.11 – Chorus of Maidens
No.12 – Scene
No.12a – Onegin's Aria

Act 2

No.13 – Entr'acte & Waltz
No.14 – Scene & Triquet's Couplets
No.15 – Mazurka & Scene
No.16 – Finale
No.17 – Scene
No.17a – Lensky's Aria
No.18 – Duel Scene

Act 3

No.19 – Polonaise
No.20 – Scene & Ecossaise
No.20a – Prince Gremin's Aria
No.21 – Scene
No.21a – Onegin's Aria
No.22 – Closing Scene

== Recordings ==
- 1936, Vasiliy Nebolsin (conductor), Bolshoi Theatre Orchestra and Chorus, Panteleimon Nortsov (Onegin), Sergei Lemeshev (Lensky), Lavira Zhukovskaya (Tatyana), Bronislava Zlatogorova (Olga), Maria Botienina (Larina), Konkordiya Antarova (Filipyevna), Aleksandr Pirogov (Gremin), I. Kovalenko (Triquet)
- 1937, Alexander Melik-Pashayev, Bolshoi Theatre Orchestra and Chorus, Panteleimon Nortsov (Onegin), Ivan Kozlovsky (Lensky), Elena Kruglikova (Tatyana), Elizaveta Antonova (Olga), Ludmila Rudnitskaya (Larina), Vera Makarova (Filipyevna), Maxim Mikhailov (Gremin), Sergei Ostrumov (Triquet)
- 1948, Aleksander Orlov (conductor), Bolshoi Theatre Orchestra and Chorus, Andrey Ivanov (Onegin), Ivan Kozlovsky (Lensky), Yelena Kruglikova (Tatyana), Maria Maksakova (Olga), B. Amborskaya (Larina), Fayina Petrova (Filipyevna), Mark Reyzen (Gremin), I. Kovalenko (Triquet)
- 1955, Oskar Danon (conductor), Chorus and Orchestra of the National Theatre, Belgrade, Dušan Popović (Onegin), Drago Starc (Lensky), Valerija Heybal (Tatyana), Biserka Cvejić (Olga), Mira Verčević (Larina), Melanija Bugarinović (Filipyevna), Miroslav Čangalović (Gremin), Stepan Andrashevich (Triquet)
- 1956, Boris Khaikin (conductor), Bolshoi Theatre Orchestra and Chorus, Yevgeniy Belov (Onegin), Sergei Lemeshev (Lensky), Galina Vishnevskaya (Tatyana), Larisa Avdeyeva (Olga), Valentina Petrova (Larina), Yevgeniya Verbitskaya (Filipyevna), Ivan Petrov (Gremin), Andrey Sokolov (Triquet), Igor Mikhaylov (Zaretsky)
- 1957 Dimitri Mitropoulos (conductor), The Metropolitan Opera, George London (Onegin), Richard Tucker (Lensky), Lucine Amara (Tatiana), Rosalind Elias (Olga), Martha Lipton (Larina), Belén Amparám (Filipyevna), Giorgio Tozzi (Gremin), Alessio De Paolis (Triquet), George Cehanovsky (Zaretsky)
- 1961, Lovro von Matacic (conductor), Wiener Staatsoper, Dietrich Fischer-Dieskau (Onegin), Anton Dermota (Lensky), Sena Jurinac (Tatyana), Biserca Cvejic (Olga), Hilde Konetzni (Marina), Hilde Rössel-Majdan (Filipyevna), Walter Krempel (Gremin), Peter Klein (Triquet)
- 1970, Mstislav Rostropovich (conductor), Bolshoi Theatre Orchestra and Chorus, Yuri Mazurok (Onegin), Vladimir Atlantov (Lensky), Galina Vishnevskaya (Tatyana), Tamara Sinyavskaya (Olga), Alexander Ognivtsev (Gremin), Tatiana Tugarinova (Larina), Larisa Avdeyeva (Filipyevna), Vitaly Vlasov (Triquet) Le Chant du Monde
- 1974, Sir Georg Solti (conductor), Orchestra of The Royal Opera House, Covent Garden and John Alldis Choir, Bernd Weikl (Onegin), Stuart Burrows (Lensky), Teresa Kubiak (Tatyana), Julia Hamari (Olga), Nicolai Ghiaurov (Gremin), Michel Senechal (Triquet) Decca 417 413–2
- 1979, Mark Ermler (conductor), Bolshoi Theatre Orchestra and Chorus, Yuri Mazurok (Onegin), Vladimir Atlantov (Lensky), Tamara Milashkina (Tatyana), Tamara Sinyavskaya (Olga), Evgeny Nesterenko (Gremin), Tatiana Tugarinova (Larina), Larisa Avdeyeva (Filipyevna), Lev Kuznetsov (Triquet) Melodiya
- 1986, Vladimir Fedoseyev (conductor), Moscow Radio and TV Symphony Orchestra and Choir, Yuri Mazurok (Onegin), Alexander Fedin (Lensky), Lidiya Chernikh (Tatyana), Tamara Sinyavskaya (Olga), Alexander Vedernikov (Gremin), Yannis Sprogis (Triquet) APC 101.751
- 1987, James Levine (conductor), Staatskapelle Dresden and Rundfunkchor Leipzig, Sir Thomas Allen (Onegin), Neil Shicoff (Lensky), Mirella Freni (Tatyana), Anne Sofie von Otter (Olga), Rosemarie Lang (Larina), Ruthild Engert (Filipyevna), Paata Burchuladze (Gremin), Michel Senechal (Triquet) DG 423 959–2
- 1993 Semyon Bychkov (conductor), Orchestre de Paris, Dmitri Hvorostovsky (Onegin), Neil Shicoff (Lensky), Nuccia Focile (Tatyana), Olga Borodina (Olga), Sarah Walker (Larina), Irina Arkhipova (Filipyevna), Alexander Anisimov (Gremin)
- 1994 Andrew Davis (conductor), London Philharmonic, Wojciech Drabowicz (Onegin), Elena Prokina (Tatyana), Louise Winter (Olga), Yvonne Minton (Madame Larina), Martin Thompson (Lensky), John Fryatt (Monsieur Triquet), Ludmilla Filatova (Filipyevna), Frode Olsen (Gremin), Christopher Thornton-Holmes (Zaretsky) (DVD recording of the Graham Vick production)
- 2007 Valery Gergiev (conductor), The Metropolitan Opera Orchestra and Chorus, Dmitri Hvorostovsky (Onegin), Ramón Vargas (Lensky), Renee Fleming (Tatyana), Elena Zaremba (Olga), Svetlana Volkova (Larina), Larisa Shevchenko (Filipyevna), Sergei Aleksashkin (Gremin), Jean-Paul Fouchécourt (Triquet), Richard Bernstein (Zaretsky), Keith Miller (A captain), Stage Director: Robert Carsen (DVD recording of the 24 February 2007 live transmission to movie theatres)
- 2011 Mariss Jansons (conductor), Royal Concertgebouw Orchestra, Bo Skovhus (Onegin), Andrej Dunaev (Lensky), Krassimira Stoyanova (Tatyana), Elena Maximofa (Olga), Olga Savova (Marina), Nina Romanova (Filipyevna), Mikhail Petrenko (Gremin), Guy de Mey (Triquet), Roger Smeets (Zaretsky) Stage Director: Stefan Herheim, Muziektheater (Label: Opus Arte)
- 2013 Valery Gergiev (conductor), The Metropolitan Opera Orchestra and Chorus, Mariusz Kwiecień (Onegin), Piotr Beczała (Lensky), Anna Netrebko (Tatyana), Oksana Volkova (Olga), Elena Zaremba (Larina), Larissa Diadkova (Filipyevna), Alexei Tanovitsky (Gremin), John Graham-Hall (Triquet), Richard Bernstein (Zaretsky), David Crawford (A captain), Stage Director: Deborah Warner (DVD recording of the 5 October 2013 live transmission to movie theatres)
- 2013 Robin Ticciati (conductor), Royal Opera House, Covent Garden, Simon Keenlyside (Onegin), Pavol Breslik (Lensky), Krassimira Stoyanova (Tatyana), Elena Maximova (Olga), Diana Montague (Larina), Kathleen Wilkinson (Filipyevna), Peter Rose (Gremin), Christophe Mortagne (Triquet), Jihoon Kim (Zaretsky), Stage Director: Kasper Holten

Sung in German:

- 1962 Joseph Keilberth (conductor), Bayerische Staatsoper, Hermann Prey (Onegin), Fritz Wunderlich (Lensky), Ingeborg Bremert (Tatyana), Brigitte Fassbaender (Olga), Herta Töpper (Larina), Lillian Benningsen (Filipyevna), Mino Yahia (Gremin), Ferry Gruber (Triquet), Josef Knapp (Zaretsky)

Sung in English:

- 1992 Sir Charles Mackerras (conductor), Orchestra and Chorus of Welsh National Opera, Thomas Hampson (Onegin), Neil Rosenshein (Lensky), Dame Kiri Te Kanawa (Tatiana), Patricia Bardon (Olga), Linda Finnie (Larina), Elizabeth Bainbridge (Filipyevna), John Connell (Gremin), Nicolai Gedda (Triquet), Richard Van Allan (Zaretsky/A captain)

== Allusions ==
Prince Gremin's aria «Любви все возрасты покорны» – "Love knows no age" (Act III, Scene I) is partially hummed by the characters of Vershinin and Masha in Anton Chekhov's play Three Sisters.

In the 1999 film The Talented Mr. Ripley, Tom Ripley watches a sequence from Eugene Onegin's duel scene.

== Screen versions ==
- In 1958 Lenfilm (USSR) produced a film Eugene Onegin. It was directed by Roman Tikhomirov and starred Vadim Medvedev as Onegin, Ariadna Shengelaya as Tatyana and Igor Ozerov as Lensky. The principal solo parts were performed by notable opera singers of the Bolshoi Theatre. The film was well received by critics and viewers.
- In 1988 Decca/Channel 4 (Great Britain) produced a film adaptation of the opera, directed by Petr Weigl. Sir Georg Solti was the conductor, while the cast featured Michal Docolomanský as Onegin and Magdaléna Vášáryová as Tatyana (sung by Teresa Kubiak).
