= The Queen of Spades (opera) =

1890 opera by Pyotr Ilyich Tchaikovsky

- Opera by P. I. Tchaikovsky
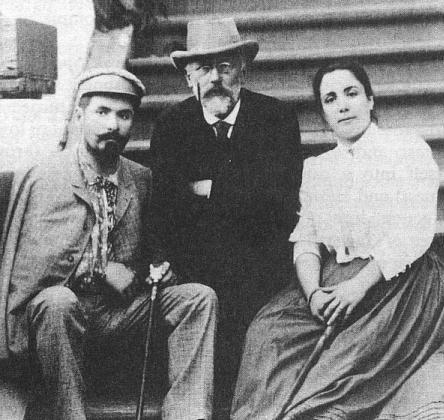
- Tchaikovsky (center) with Nikolay and Medea Figner, who sang the roles of Herman and Lisa in the premiere in 1890
- Native title: Пиковая дама
- Librettist: Modest Tchaikovsky
- Language: Russian
- Based on: The Queen of Spades by Alexander Pushkin
- Premiere: 19 December 1890; Mariinsky Theatre, Saint Petersburg

The Queen of Spades or Pique Dame, (Note: The Pique Dame title had its origin in German-speaking countries and is now also used in English. While Pique Dame is a Gallicism, the actual French title is Dame de Pique.) Op. 68 (Russian: Пиковая дама, Pikovaya dama, French: La Dame de Pique) is an opera in three acts (seven scenes) by Pyotr Ilyich Tchaikovsky to a Russian libretto by the composer's brother Modest Tchaikovsky, based on the 1834 novella of the same name by Alexander Pushkin, but with a dramatically altered plot. The premiere took place in 1890 at the Mariinsky Theatre in Saint Petersburg, Russia.

== Composition history ==
The Imperial Theatre offered Tchaikovsky a commission to write an opera based on the plot sketch by Ivan Vsevolozhsky in 1887/88. After first turning it down, Tchaikovsky accepted it in 1889. Toward the end of that year, he met the theatre's managers to discuss the material and sketch out some of the scenes.

He completed the full score in Florence in only 44 days. Later, working with the tenor who was to perform the lead character, he created two versions of Herman's aria in the seventh scene, using different keys. The changes can be found in the proof sheets and inserts for the first and second editions of the printed version of the score. While composing the music, Tchaikovsky edited the libretto significantly, changing some of the text and adding his own lyrics to two arias.

== Performance history ==
Herman, the lead character, sings in all seven scenes. This requires great skill and endurance by the performer. The part was written with the notable Russian tenor Nikolay Figner in mind, and he performed it at the premiere. His wife Medea Mei-Figner played the role of Lisa.

The composer himself took part in the preparation of the Saint Petersburg premiere. Critics gave rave reviews. Tchaikovsky later wrote, "Figner and the Saint Petersburg orchestra... have made true miracles." The premiere's success was tremendous. The opera was just as successful at the Kyiv premiere twelve days later. The Bolshoi Theatre premiere took place the following year. Tchaikovsky was extremely pleased with his effort.

Saint Petersburg and world premiere

- Date: 19 December, (O.S. 7 December), 1890
- Place: Mariinsky Theatre, Saint Petersburg
- Conductor: Eduard Nápravník
- Scene Designers: Vasilyev, Yanov, Levot, Ivanov, Andreyev
- Balletmaster: Marius Petipa

Kyiv premiere

- Date: 31 December (O.S. 19 December), 1890
- Place:
- Conductor: Iosif Pribik

Moscow premiere

- Date: 4 November 1891
- Place: Bolshoi Theatre
- Conductor: Ippolit Al'tani
- Scene Designers: Karl Valts (Waltz), Lebedev
- Balletmasters: Marius Petipa, Lev Ivanov

Other notable performances

- 11 or 12 October 1892, Prague, first performance outside Russia; conducted by Adolf Čech in the presence of the composer (sung in Czech, trans. V. J. Novotný)
- 1902, first performance in Vienna, Vienna State Opera, conducted by Gustav Mahler
- 1904, Moscow, Bolshoi Theatre, conducted by Sergei Rachmaninoff
- 5 March 1910, Metropolitan Opera, New York City, first performance in the USA (in German), conducted by Gustav Mahler
- 29 May 1915, London, first performance in England (in Russian); starring Vladimir Rosing.
- 27 December 1972, Metropolitan Opera, New York City, first performance in its original Russian language (This was the first performance by the Metropolitan Opera of a Russian opera in its original language.)

== Roles ==
Roles, voice types, premiere casts
Role	Voice type	Saint Petersburg premiere, 19 December (O.S. 7 December) 1890 Conductor: Eduard Nápravník	Kyiv premiere, 31 December (O.S. 19 December) 1890 Conductor: Josef Přibík	Bolshoy Theatre, Moscow premiere, 4 November 1891 Conductor: Ippolit Al'tani
Herman	tenor	Nikolay Figner	Mikhail Medvedev	Mikhail Medvedev
Count Tomsky	baritone	Ivan Melnikov	Nicolay Dementyev	Bogomir Korsov
Prince Yeletsky	baritone	Leonid Yakovlev	Ioakim Tartakov	Pavel Khokhlov
Chekalinsky	tenor	Vasilyev II	Alexander Davydov	
Surin	bass	Yalmar Frey		
Chaplitsky	tenor	Konstantin Kondaraki		
Narumov	bass	Vladimir Sobolev		Ivan Matchinsky
Master of Ceremonies	tenor	Vasily Yefimov		
Countess	mezzo-soprano	Marya Slavina	Marya Smirnova	Aleksandra Krutikova
Lisa	soprano	Medea Mei-Figner	Aleksandra Matsulevich	Mariya Deysha-Sionitskaya
Polina	contralto	Mariya Dolina		Vera Gnucheva
Governess	mezzo-soprano	Maria-Wilhelmina Pilz (Pilts)		
Masha	soprano	Yulya Yunosova		
Boy-Commander	spoken			
Prilepa	soprano	Olga Olgina		
Milovzor	contralto	Nina Fridé (Friede)		Varvara Pavlenkova
Zlatogor	baritone	Aleksandr Klimov II		Aleksandr Strijevskiy
Chorus, silent roles: Nursemaids, governesses, wet-nurses, strollers, children, gamblers
Act 2 Divertissement
Prilepa, or Chlöe	soprano			
Milovzor, or Daphnis	contralto			
Zlatogor, or Plutus	baritone			
Chorus, silent roles: Cupid, Hymen, shepherds and shepherdesses

Note: The contralto roles of Milovzor and Polina and the baritone roles of Zlatogor and Tomsky can be performed by the same singers. Prilepa has occasionally been double cast with Lisa, although Tchaikovsky did not approve of this doubling, unlike the others.

== Synopsis ==
Time: The close of the 18th century

Place: Saint Petersburg, Russia

=== Act 1 ===
Scene 1

During the reign of Catherine the Great (1762–96), children are at play in Saint Petersburg's Summer Garden pretending to be soldiers. Two officers—Surin and Chekalinsky—enter, the former complaining about his bad luck at gambling. They remark that another officer, Herman, seems obsessed with the gaming table but never bets, being frugal and methodical. Herman appears with Tomsky, who remarks that his friend hardly seems like his old self: is anything bothering him? Herman admits he is in love with a girl above his station whose name he does not even know. When Prince Yeletsky, an officer, strolls into the park, Chekalinsky congratulates him on his recent engagement. Yeletsky declares his happiness while Herman, aside, curses him enviously. Yeletsky points out his fiancée, Lisa, who has just appeared with her grandmother, the old Countess. Catching sight of Herman, the two women note they have seen him before, staring at them with frightening intensity. Herman realizes that Lisa is his unknown beloved. When Yeletsky and the women leave, Herman is lost in thought as the other officers discuss the Countess: known as the Queen of Spades and formerly as the Muscovite Venus, due to her beauty, she succeeded at gambling in her youth by trading amorous favors for the winning formula of Count St. Germain in Paris. Tomsky says only two men, her husband and, later on, her young lover, ever learned the secret of playing three special cards, because she was warned by an apparition to beware a "third suitor" who would kill her trying to force it from her. Musing on the winning sequence of three cards, the others lightly suggest that this might be the way for Herman to win without risking any money. Threatened by approaching thunder, all leave except Herman, who vows to learn the Countess's secret.

Scene 2

At home, Lisa plays the spinet as she and her friend Polina sing a duet about evening in the countryside. Their friends ask to hear more, so Polina launches into a sad ballad, followed by a dancelike song. As the merriment increases, Lisa remains pensively apart. A Governess chides the girls for indulging in unbecoming folk dancing and asks the visitors to leave. Polina, the last to go, urges Lisa to cheer up; Lisa replies that after a storm there is a beautiful night and asks the maid, Masha, not to close the French windows to the balcony. Alone, Lisa voices her unhappiness with her engagement; she has been stirred by the romantic look of the young man in the park. To her shock, Herman appears on the balcony. Claiming he is about to shoot himself over her betrothal to another, he begs her to take pity on him. When the Countess is heard knocking, Lisa hides Herman and opens the door to the old woman, who tells her to shut the windows and go to bed. After the Countess retires, Lisa asks Herman to leave but is betrayed by her feelings and falls into his embrace.

=== Act 2 ===
Scene 1

Not long afterward, at a masked ball, Herman's comrades comment on his obsession with the secret of the winning cards. Yeletsky passes with Lisa, noting her sadness and reassuring her of his love ("Ya vas lyublyu" "I love you"). Herman receives a note from Lisa, asking him to meet her later. Surin and Chekalinsky sneak up behind him with the intent of playing a joke on him, muttering he is the "third suitor" who will learn the Countess's secret, then melt into the crowd as Herman wonders whether he is hearing things. The master of ceremonies announces a tableau of shepherdesses. Lisa slips Herman the key to her grandmother's room, saying the old woman will not be there the next day, but Herman insists on coming that very night. Thinking fate is handing him the Countess's secret, he leaves. The guests' attention turns to the imminent arrival of Catherine the Great, for which a polonaise by Osip Kozlovsky is played and sung in greeting.

Scene 2

Herman slips into the Countess's room and looks in fascination at her portrait as the "Muscovite Venus"; musing how their fates, he feels, are linked: one of them will die because of the other. He lingers too long before he can go to Lisa's room and hears the Countess's retinue coming, so he conceals himself as the old lady approaches. The Countess deplores the manners of the day and reminisces about the better times of her youth, when she sang in Versailles "Je crains de lui parler la nuit" ("I fear to talk with him at night", in French; Laurette's Aria from André Grétry's opera Richard Cœur-de-Lion) before the Pompadour herself. As she dozes off, Herman stands before her. She awakens in horror as he pleads with her to tell him her secret. When she remains speechless, he grows desperate and threatens her with a pistol—at which she dies of fright. Lisa rushes in, only to learn that the lover to whom she gave her heart was more interested in the Countess's secret. She orders him out and falls sobbing.

=== Act 3 ===
Scene 1

In his room at the barracks, as the winter wind howls, Herman reads a letter from Lisa, who wants him to meet her at midnight by the river bank. He imagines he hears the chorus chanting at the old Countess's funeral, then is startled by a knock at the window. The old woman's ghost appears, announcing that against her will she must tell him the secret so that he can marry and save Lisa. Dazed, Herman repeats the three cards she tells him—three, seven, ace.

Scene 2

By the Winter Canal, Lisa waits for Herman: it is already near midnight, and though she clings to a forlorn hope that he still loves her, she sees her youth and happiness swallowed in darkness. At last he appears, but after uttering words of reassurance, he starts to babble wildly about the Countess and her secret. No longer even recognizing Lisa, he rushes away. Realizing that all is lost, she commits suicide by jumping into the Canal.

Scene 3

At a gambling house, Herman's fellow officers are finishing supper and getting ready to play faro. Yeletsky, who has not gambled before, joins the group because his engagement has been broken: "unlucky in love, lucky at cards". Tomsky entertains the others with a song. Then Chekalinsky leads a traditional gamblers' song. Settling down to play, they are surprised when Herman arrives, wild and distracted. Yeletsky senses a confrontation and asks Tomsky to be his second if a duel should result. Herman, intent only on betting, starts with a huge bet of 40,000 rubles. He bets the three and wins, upsetting the others with his maniacal expression. Next he bets the seven and wins again. At this he takes a wine glass and declares that life is but a game. Yeletsky accepts his challenge to bet on the next round. Herman bets everything he has on the ace but when he shows his card he is told he is holding the queen of spades. Seeing the Countess's ghost laughing at her vengeance, Herman asks Yeletsky's and Lisa's forgiveness and takes his own life. The others pray for his tormented soul.

== Principal arias and numbers ==
Act 1
Aria: "I don't even know her name" «Я имени еë не знаю» (Ya imyeni yeyo nye znayu) (Herman)
Aria: "Once in Versailles (Three Cards)" «Однажды в Версале (Три Карты)» (Odnazhdï v Versalye (Tri kartï)) (Tomsky)
Romance: "Lovely lady friends" «Подруги милые» (Podrugi milïe) (Polina)
Arioso: "Why these tears" «Откуда эти слëзы» (Otkuda eti slyozï) (Lisa)
Aria: "Forgive me, celestial creature" «Прости, небесное созданье» (Prosti, nyebesnoye sozdanye) (Herman)
Act 2
Aria: "I love you beyond measure" «Я вас люблю» (Ya vas lyublyu) (Yeletsky)
Aria: "Je crains de lui parler la nuit" ("I fear to talk with him at night", in French) (Countess)
Act 3
Arioso: "I am worn out by grief" «Ax! истoмилacь я гopeм» (Akh! istomilas ya goryem) (Lisa)
Song: "If pretty girls could fly like birds" «Если б милые девицы» (Yesli b milïye dyevitsï) (Tomsky)
Aria: "What is our life? A game!" «Что наша жизнь? Игра!» (Shto nasha zhizn? Igra!) (Herman)

== Instrumentation ==
Source: Tchaikovsky Research

- Strings: violins I & II, violas, cellos, double basses
- Woodwinds: three flutes (3rd doubling piccolo), two oboes (first doubling cor anglais), two clarinets (B-flat, A), bass clarinet (B-flat), two bassoons
- Brass: four horns (F), two trumpets (B-flat, A), three trombones, tuba
- Percussion: timpani, snare drum, bass drum
- Other: harp, piano

== In popular culture ==
"Life is but a game" (Russian: «Что наша жизнь? Игра!» (Shto nasha zhizn? Igra!), literally, "What is our life? A game!") a quote from act 3 of the opera, became a proverb in Russian. What? Where? When?, a trivia game and one of the most popular TV-shows in Russia and former Soviet countries, starts with a musical quotation from the opera, Herman singing the phrase "Life is but a game."

== Recordings ==
- 1937: Samuil Samosud (conductor), Bolshoi Theatre Chorus & Orchestra; Nikandr Khanayev (Herman), Ksenia Derzhinskaya (Lisa), Faina Petrova (Countess), Alexander Baturin (Count Tomsky), Piotr Selivanov (Prince Yeletsky), Nadezhda Obukhova (Polina). Melodiya
- 1942: Samuil Samosud (conductor), Bolshoi Theatre Chorus & Orchestra; Nikandr Khanayev (Herman), Ksenia Derzhinskaya (Lisa), Bronislava Zlatagorova (Countess), Alexander Baturin (Count Tomsky), Panteleimon Nortsov (Prince Yeletsky), Maria Maksakova (Polina). Aquarius
- 1947: Arthur Rother (conductor), Radio-Orchester Berlin; Rudolf Schock (Herman), Elisabeth Grümmer (Lisa), Margarete Klose (Countess), Jaro Prohaska (Count Tomsky), Hans Hermann Nissen (Prince Yeletsky), Anneliese Müller (Polina). Gala (Abridged in German)
- 1950: Alexander Melik-Pashayev (conductor), Bolshoi Theatre Chorus & Orchestra; Georgi Nelepp (Herman), Evgeniya Smolenskaya (Lisa), Evgeniya Verbitskaya (Countess), Alexei Ivanov (Count Tomsky), Pavel Lisitsian (Prince Yeletsky), Veronika Borisenko (Polina). Great Hall
- 1952: Artur Rodzinsky (conductor), Chorus and Orchestra of the Maggio Musicale Fiorentino; David Poleri (Herman), Sena Jurinac (Lisa), Gianna Pederzini (Countess), Mario Petri (Count Tomsky), Ettore Bastianini (Prince Yeletsky), Rina Corsi (Polina). Andromeda (Live in Italian)
- 1955: Krešimir Baranović (conductor), Yugoslav Army Chorus, Children's Choir of Radio Belgrade, & Orchestra of the National Opera, Belgrade; Alexander Marinković (Herman), Valerija Heybal (Lisa), Melanija Bugarinović (Countess), Jovan Gligorijević (Count Tomsky), Dušan Popović (Prince Yeletsky), Biserka Cvejić (Polina). Deutsche Grammophon
- 1958: Sergei Yeltsin (conductor), Choir and Orchestra of the State Kirov Opera; Matvei Gavrilkin (Herman), Ludmila Revina (Lisa), Sofia Preobrazhenskaya (Countess), Lipa Solomiak (Count Tomsky), Konstantin Laptev (Prince Yeletsky), Valentina Krayushkina (Polina). IM Lab (Live)
- 1961: Nino Sanzogno (conductor), Teatro alla Scala Chorus and Orchestra; Antonio Annaloro (Herman), Leyla Gencer (Lisa), Marianna Radev (Countess), Ivo Vinco (Count Tomsky), Sesto Bruscantini (Prince Yeletsky), Adriana Lazzarini (Polina). Gala (Live in Italian)
- 1966: Boris Khaikin (conductor), Bolshoi Theatre Chorus & Orchestra; Zurab Andzhaparidze (Herman), Tamara Milashkina (Lisa), Valentina Levko (Countess), Mikhail Kiselev (Count Tomsky), Yuri Mazurok (Prince Yeletsky), Irina Arkhipova (Polina). Melodiya
- 1974: Mark Ermler (conductor), Bolshoi Theatre Chorus & Orchestra; Vladimir Atlantov (Herman), Tamara Milashkina (Lisa), Valentina Levko (Countess), Vladimir Valaitis (Count Tomsky), Andrei Fedoseyev (Prince Yeletsky), Galina Borisova (Polina). Melodiya
- 1976: Mstislav Rostropovich (conductor), Choeur Tchaikovsky, Maîtrise de Radio France, & Orchestre National de France; Peter Gougaloff (Herman), Galina Vishnevskaya (Lisa), Regina Resnik (Countess), Dan Iordachescu (Count Tomsky), Bernd Weikl (Prince Yeletsky), Hanna Schwarz (Polina). Deutsche Grammophon
- 1984: Algis Zhuraitis (conductor), Bavarian State Opera Chorus and Orchestra; Vladimir Atlantov (Herman), Julia Varady (Lisa), Elena Obraztsova (Countess), Alexander Voroshilo (Count Tomsky), Bodo Brinkmann (Prince Yeletsky), Ludmila Semtschuk (Polina). Orfeo (Live)
- 1989: Emil Tchakarov (conductor), Bulgarian National Chorus 'Svetoslav Obretenov' & Sofia Festival Orchestra; Wieslaw Ochman (Herman), Stefka Evstatieva (Lisa), Penka Dilova (Countess), Ivan Konsulov (Count Tomsky), Yuri Mazurok (Prince Yeletsky), Stefania Toczyska (Polina). Sony Classical
- 1990: Vladimir Fedoseyev (conductor), The Yurlov State Academic Russian Choir, The Children's Choir 'Vesna', & Tchaikovsky Symphony Orchestra; Vitaly Tarashchenko (Herman), Natalya Datsko (Lisa), Irina Arkhipova (Countess), Grigory Gritsuk (Count Tomsky), Dmitri Hvorostovsky (Prince Yeletsky), Nina Romanova (Polina). Relief
- 1992: Seiji Ozawa (conductor), Tanglewood Festival Chorus & Boston Symphony Orchestra; Vladimir Atlantov (Herman), Mirella Freni (Lisa), Maureen Forrester (Countess), Sergei Leiferkus (Count Tomsky), Dmitri Hvorostovsky (Yeletsky), Katherine Ciesinski (Polina). RCA Victor Red Seal
- 1993: Valery Gergiev (conductor), Kirov Theater Chorus & Orchestra; Gegam Grigorian (Herman), Maria Guleghina (Lisa), Irina Arkhipova (Countess), Nikolai Putilin (Count Tomsky), Vladimir Chernov (Prince Yeletsky), Olga Borodina (Polina). Philips Records
- 2015: Mariss Jansons (conductor), Bavarian Radio Chorus & Bavarian Radio Symphony Orchestra; Misha Didyk (Herman), Tatiana Serjan (Lisa), Larissa Diadkova (Countess), Alexey Shishlyaev (Count Tomsky), Alexey Markov (Prince Yeletsky), Oksana Volkova (Polina). BR-KLASSIK
