= Yuri Mazurok =

Russian opera singer

Yuri Antonovich Mazurok (Russian: Юрий Антонович Мазурок; 18 July 1931, Kraśnik – 1 April 2006, Moscow) was a Soviet and Russian operatic baritone of Polish ethnicity.

He sang leading roles with major opera houses internationally, including the Bolshoi Theatre, where he made his debut as Eugene Onegin, to become his most famous part, in 1963, the Canadian Opera Company, the Metropolitan Opera (La traviata, Eugene Onegin, and Tosca), the Royal Opera, London, and the Vienna State Opera.

Among Mazurok's recordings are Eugene Onegin (with Galina Vishnevskaya and Vladimir Atlantov, conducted by Mstislav Rostropovich, 1970; then with Tamara Milashkina and Atlantov, led by Mark Ermler, 1979), and Il trovatore (opposite Katia Ricciarelli, José Carreras, and Stefania Toczyska, conducted by Sir Colin Davis, 1980). On DVD can be found a 1983 Bolshoi production of The Queen of Spades (Pique-dame), with Atlantov, Milashkina, and Elena Obraztsova. On a 9 December 1978 DVD, Mazurok sings Escamillo in a production of Carmen at the Wiener Statsoper with Elena Obraztsova (Carmen), Plácido Domingo (Don Jose), and Isobel Buchanan (Micaela), conducted by Carlos Kleiber and directed by Franco Zeffirelli.

== Awards and honors ==
- Honored Artist of the RSFSR (1968)
- People's Artist of the RSFSR (1972)
- People's Artist of the USSR (1976)
- Two Orders of the Red Banner of Labour (1971, 1981)
