= Tamara Milashkina =

Russian soprano (1934–2024)

- Тамара Милашкина
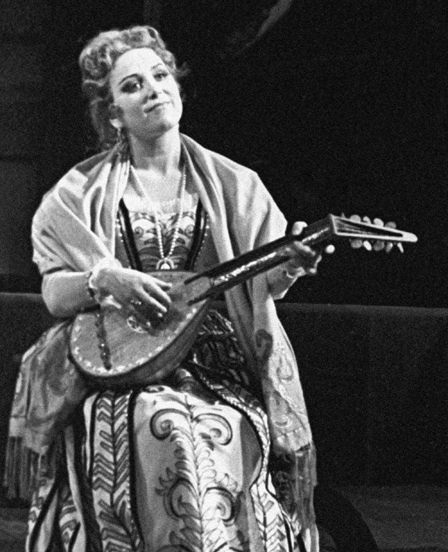
- Milashkina in Verdi's Falstaff, 1962
- Born: Tamara Andreyevna Mirnenko; 13 September 1934; Astrakhan, Russian SFSR, Soviet Union
- Died: 10 January 2024 (aged 89); Vienna, Austria
- Education: Moscow Conservatory
- Occupation: Operatic soprano
- Organization: Bolshoi Theatre
- Spouse: Vladimir Atlantov
- Awards: People's Artist of the USSR; Glinka State Prize

Tamara Andreyevna Milashkina (née Mirnenko; Russian: Тамара Андреевна Милашкина [Мирненко]; 13 September 1934 – 10 January 2024) was a Russian lyric and dramatic soprano. A member of the Bolshoi Theatre from 1958 to 1989, she also appeared at La Scala in Milan, throughout Europe and at the Metropolitan Opera. She focused on roles by Tchaikovsky such as Lisa in Pique Dame and Tatyana in Eugene Onegin. She was the first Soviet soprano to be trained at the studio of La Scala in Milan, and her Italian repertoire included Verdi's Leonora in Il trovatore, Elisabetta in Don Carlo and Aida, and Puccini's Tosca.

She often appeared alongside her husband, the tenor Vladimir Atlantov, on stage and in recordings. She made many recordings, including less frequently performed Russian operas such as Tchaikovsky's The Oprichnik and Rimsky-Korsakov's The Noblewoman Vera Sheloga, and videos of Dargomyzhsky's The Stone Guest, Rimsky-Korsakov's Sadko, and Pique Dame.

== Life and career ==
Tamara Andreyevna Mirnenko was born in Astrakhan on 13 September 1934. After secondary school she entered the Astrakhan library technical school. During this time, Milashkina belonged to a choir. She began voice studies at the Astrakhan Music College in 1953. Maria Maksakova Sr., a famous singer who had studied at the college, noticed her in a performance, and recommended studies at the Moscow Conservatory. She applied and was accepted due to the natural quality of her colourful voice. Milashkina studied there with Elena Katulskaya. In 1957 she received the Gold medal of the International Youth Festival. She graduated in 1959.

In her final year of studies, Milashkina became a member of the Bolshoi Opera in 1958, making her official debut as Tatyana in Tchaikovsky's Eugene Onegin; she remained one of the leading sopranos until 1989. Her roles included Lisa in Tchaikovsky's Pique Dame, Katharina in Shebalin's The Taming of the Shrew, Liubka in Prokofiev's Semyon Kotko, Fevroniya in Rimsky-Korsakov's The Legend of the Invisible City of Kitezh and the Maiden Fevroniya, Verdi's Leonora in Il trovatore and Aida, and Puccini's Tosca. Her Russian repertoire also included Yaroslavna in Borodin's Prince Igor, the Tsarina in Rimsky-Korsakov's The Tale of Tsar Saltan, Natasha in Prokofief's War and Peace, and Maria in Tchaikovsky's Mazeppa. Other Verdi roles ware Elisabetta in Don Carlos, Amelia in Un ballo in maschera and Desdemona in Otello.

She studied further at the opera studio of La Scala in Milan from 1961–62, where she appeared as the first Soviet soprano in 1962 as Lidia in Verdi's La battaglia di Legnano, conducted by Gianandrea Gavazzeni. In Bolshoi productions, she performed there also in 1964 as both Lisa in Pique Dame and Natasha in War and Peace, alongside Juri Mazurok as Prince Bolkonsky, and Alexander Vedernikov as General Kutusov.

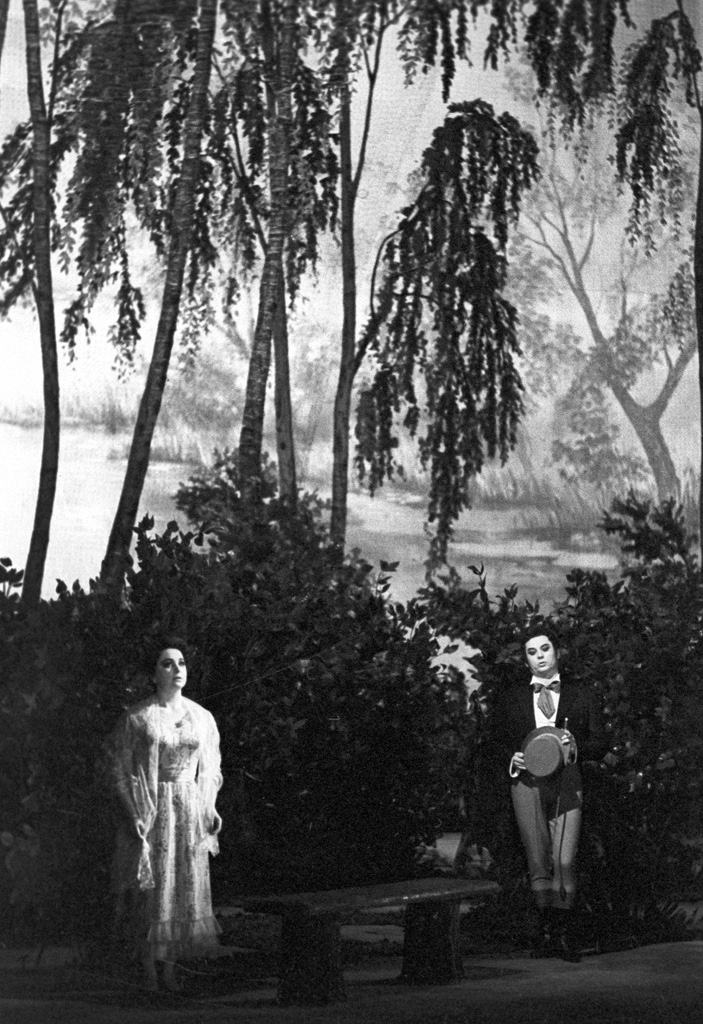
Milashkina as Tatyana and Yury Mazurok as Onegin in a 1971 Bolshoi production

Milashkina appeared at the Vienna State Opera from 1971 first as Lisa, with great success, later also as Leonora, Tosca, Aida and Elisabetta. She performed as Tosca at the Opéra de Paris in 1969, and both Tosca and Tatyana at the Deutsche Oper Berlin in 1974, as Tosca also at the Opéra de Paris. Milashkina appeared as a guest at other leading opera houses of Europe, such as the Oslo Opera House, the Finnish National Opera in Helsinki, and at the Hungarian State Opera House in Budapest in 1974. She performed at the Greek National Opera as Leonora in Il trovatore and Lisa in 1974 and as Tatyana in Eugene Onegin in 1976. She toured extensively with the Bolshoi, including to New York's Metropolitan Opera in 1975 for Eugene Onegin and Pique Dame; she performed alongside her husband, tenor Vladimir Atlantov, in Onegin conducted by Fuat Mansurov and in Pique Dame conducted by Yuri Simonov. The New York Times music critic Harold C. Schonberg summarised the effect of this performance of Onegin, writing that "[there] was the special kind of authenticity that only Russians can supply in this singularly beautiful opera".

In 1973, she received the title People's Artist of the USSR, and the Glinka State Prize in 1982.

After leaving the Bolshoi Theatre in 1989, she performed internationally in France, Italy, Germany, Greece, Japan and the U.S., among others.

=== Voice ===
The New Grove Dictionary of Opera described Milashkina's voice in 1992: "She has a voice of distinctive timbre and unusual warmth and beauty; reserve and emotional depth combine to lend her stage portrayals particular sensitivity." In a 1983 portrait for the Bolshoi Theatre, E. Grosheva wrote:

Milashkina's voice is unique; nature and intelligent labour generously endowed it with freedom and richness of colours, fullness and roundness of sound – ringing, flying in the upper notes, substantial, chesty in the lows, equally collected and expressive in the whole range, covering about two and a half octaves.

A reviewer from the French newspaper Aurore noted in 1978, when the Bolshoi Theatre toured to Paris: "She slightly resembles Victoria de Los Angeles, but her voice is much more luxurious, warmer, more reverent".

Russian soprano Marina Mescheriakova spoke about Milashkina's early influence on her in a 2002 interview: "When I was a child studying piano, maybe five years old, I heard a recording of Milashkina. It made a big impression. Beautiful sounds, beautiful meanings. I liked it because she was a singer with a dark color. When I began to sing, I did not imitate her, but I thought her voice was very close to mine."

=== Personal life ===
Milashkina was married to the tenor Vladimir Atlantov; they had a daughter, Lara, born in 1963. After Milashkina's retirement from the Bolshoi, they lived in Vienna.

Tamara Milashkina died in Vienna on 10 January 2024, at the age of 89.

In 1966, a documentary Волшебница из града Китежа (The Enchantress From the City of Kitezh) was devoted to her art.

== Recordings ==
Milashkina recorded extensively for Melodiya. She recorded Tchaikovsky's early opera fragment Undina in 1963, with tenor Yevgeny Raykov and the Moscow Radio Opera Orchestra and Chorus, conducted by Yevgeny Akulov. In 1974 she recorded her most famous role, Lisa in The Queen of Spades (Pique Dame), opposite Atlantov, with Bolshoi forces conducted by Mark Ermler. She recorded Tosca the same year, again with Atlantov and conducted by Ermler; a reviewer noted that she was a "thrilling if unsubtle singer" who lived the role, summarising: "hers is a Tosca to rank with some of the finest". In 1979 she recorded Eugene Onegin, with Yuri Mazurok in the title role and again Atlantov and Ermler; a reviewer wrote that she was "clearly an intelligent artist and compensates for her occasional lack of vocal allure by her identification with a role which suits her voice type". In 1980 she recorded the role of Natalya in Tchaikovsky's The Oprichnik, conducted by Gennady Provatorov. She recorded the title role of Rimsky-Korsakov's The Noblewoman Vera Sheloga in 1985 in another Bolshoi production conducted by Ermler. She also recorded Mazeppa, and the soprano solo in Shostakovitch's 14th Symphony.

=== Videos ===
Milashkina took part in a 1979 Bolshoi DVD production of Dargomyzhsky's The Stone Guest conducted by Ermler, as Donna Anna alongside Atlantov as Don Juan and Alexander Vedernikov as Leporello. In 1980, a Bolshoi production of Rimsky-Korsakov's Sadko was released as a DVD, with Atlantov, Milashkina and Irina Arkhipova, conducted by Yuri Simonov. She appeared as Lisa again in a 1983 DVD recording of Pique Dame from the Bolshoi, conducted by Simonov, with Mazurok, Atlantov and Elena Obraztsova as the Old Countess.

== Awards ==
Milashkina's awards included:

- International competition within the framework of the VI World Festival of Youth and Students in Moscow (1957, first prize)
- Order of the Red Banner of Labour (1971)
- People's Artist of the USSR (1973)
- Order of Lenin (1976)
- Glinka State Prize of the RSFSR (1978) – for her performance as Dona Anna in the opera The Stone Guest by A. S. Dargomyzhsky
