= Ehrler =

Ehrler is a German surname. Notable people with the surname include:

- Bremer Ehrler (1914–2013), American politician
- Désirée Ehrler (born 1991), Swiss racing cyclist
- Heinrich Ehrler (1917–1945), German World War II flying ace

== See also ==
- Erler
