= Gennady Provatorov =

Soviet musician

Gennady Provatorov (Проваторов, Геннадий Пантелеймонович) (Moscow, 11 March 1929 - Minsk 4 May 2010) was a Soviet and Belarusian conductor.

Gennady Provatorov was invited to Minsk when he was nearly 60 to work at the Minsk Philharmonic and National Opera and Ballet Theatre of Belarus. He was a Belarus State Award holder and a National Artist of RSFSR.

== Discography ==
- Felix Blumenfeld - Symphony in C minor, Op 39 "To the Dear Beloved" . Vissarion Shebalin Concertino for violin & orchestra Op14/1 Golovchin 1995
- Glazunov - Fantasy: The Sea, Op 28 - USSR TV and Radio Symphony Orchestra
- Valery Kikta - symphonies and variations - Gennady Rozhdestvensky, Gennady Provatorov, Alexander Korneev, and USSR TV and Radio Symphony Orchestra 1991
- Valery Kikta - Revelations, a ballet - Gennady Provatorov, conductor; Valeri Kastelsky, piano; Alexander Zumbrovsky, cello 1991
- Gavriil Popov - Symphonies Nos. 1 & 2 Gennady Provatorov, and Moscow State Symphony Orchestra 1989
- Rachmaninov - Complete Piano Concerti 1, 2, 3 & 4 - Victor Eresco USSR Symphony Orchestra, and Gennady Provatorov (Audio CD - 1986)
- Shostakovich - Katerina Izmailova - Eleonora Andreyeva, Eduard Bulavin, and Vyacheslav Radzievsky.
- Tchaikovsky - The Oprichnik - Yevgeni Vladimirov, Tamara Milashkina, and Vladimir Matorin
