= Nikolay and Medea Figner =

Russian husband-and-wife team of opera singers

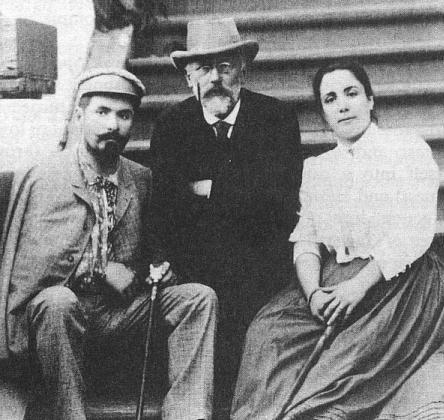
Tchaikovsky (centre) and the Figners, 1890s

Nikolay Figner (1857–1918), lyric tenor, and Medea Figner (1859–1952), mezzo-soprano, later soprano, were a husband-and-wife team of opera singers active in Russia between 1889 and 1904. Medea was Italian-born (her original surname was Mei) but she became completely Russianized after marrying Nikolay. They had separate careers before their wedding, and again after their divorce in 1904, but during the 15 years of their marriage they almost always sang in the same performances. They created the main tenor and soprano roles in two operas by Pyotr Ilyich Tchaikovsky – The Queen of Spades and Iolanta – and appeared in a number of other important Russian musical premieres.

== Nikolay Figner ==
Nikolay Nikolayevich Figner was born in Nikiforovka, near Kazan, on 9/21 February 1857. He was a brother of the famous "People's Will" revolutionary, Vera Figner (1852–1942). He joined the Russian Navy as a midshipman, and rose to the rank of lieutenant, retiring in 1881 to study voice with Vassily Samus, I. P. Pryanishnikova and Camille Everardi at the Saint Petersburg Conservatory.

Figner then travelled to Italy, where he made his debut at Naples in Gounod's Philémon et Baucis in 1882. He sang at the San Carlo Theatre and appeared at other Italian venues for a number of years. While in Italy, Figner took the opportunity to study with the prominent singing teacher Francesco Lamperti and also received instruction from E. de Roxas. Figner performed, too, in Madrid, Bucharest and London (at the Royal Opera House, Covent Garden). He travelled to South America as well during this period. On 4 November 1886, in Turin, he sang the principal tenor role in the world premiere of the revised version of Alfredo Catalani's Edmea; this was also the occasion of Arturo Toscanini's first appearance as a conductor in Italy after his initial triumph in South America. During his travels, he sang roles such as Arnold in Rossini's William Tell, the Duke in Verdi's Rigoletto, and Carlo in Donizetti's Linda di Chamounix. He also happened to appear on stage with Medea Mei in a production of Donizetti's La favorite; they formed a liaison, and he brought her back to Russia in 1887. Two years later, they wed. Figner soon established himself as the leading tenor at the Mariinsky Theatre, retaining this status until 1903.

Other Russian composers whose operas he sang were Alexander Borodin (Vladimir in Prince Igor), Alexander Dargomyzhsky (the Prince in Rusalka), and Anton Rubinstein (Sinodal in The Demon).

== Medea Mei-Figner ==
Medea Mei was born in Florence, Italy, on 4 March 1859. She studied there with Bianchi, Carozzi-Zucchi and Panofka. She sang the mezzo-soprano role in Verdi's Requiem at the young age of 16, and made her operatic debut soon afterwards, as Azucena in Il trovatore, at Sinalunga. She became well known throughout Italy, and also toured Spain, South America and Russia and visited London. Her repertoire then included Ulrica in Un ballo in maschera, Amneris in Aida, Gertrude in Ambroise Thomas's Hamlet, Leonora in Donizetti's La favorite, and the title role in Bizet's Carmen. She latter added soprano roles such as Charlotte in Massenet's Werther, and Margherita in Boito's Mefistofele.

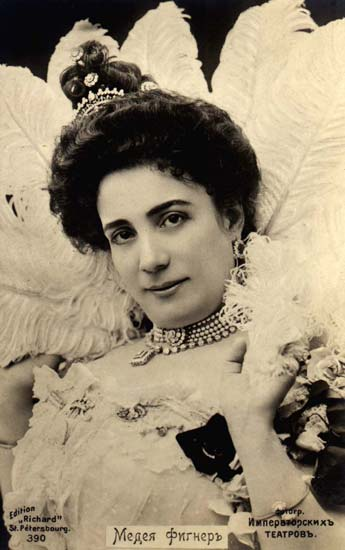
Medea Mei-Figner

Medea went to Russia with Nikolay Figner in 1887, making her debut there on 8 May at the St Petersburg Imperial Opera (the Mariinsky Theatre) as Valentine in Meyerbeer's Les Huguenots. The soprano knew no Russian at that time, and sang in Italian during the first two St Petersburg seasons. Subsequently, she was received into the Russian Orthodox Church, and married Figner on 20 February 1889. Thereafter, Nikolay made it his practice to sing only in operas in which Medea was also singing.

She was referred to after marriage as either Medea Mei-Figner (the form of her name used in most Western reference books) or simply Medea Figner. Furthermore, she was given the patronymic of Ivanovna, and is sometimes designated as Medea (or Medeya) Ivanovna (Mei-)Figner. She eventually mastered Russian to such an extent that native speakers could not tell she had learned it only from the age of 30.

Notably, Medea appeared as Mimi in the first performance of Giacomo Puccini's La bohème in Russia; she was coached by Puccini himself.

Medea Mei-Figner is the great-great-grandmother of the Italian soprano Amarilli Nizza.

== The Figners perform as a team ==
Both the Figners were considered to be outstanding actors: their first appearance together in Bizet's Carmen, as Carmen and Don José, produced an ovation said to be unprecedented in the history of Russian opera.

They were highly regarded by Pyotr Ilyich Tchaikovsky, who wrote the roles of Hermann and Liza in The Queen of Spades for them. They created the roles in the world premiere of this opera, on 19 December 1890, after rehearsing under Tchaikovsky's personal supervision. Medea was in the early stages of pregnancy at the time. In 1891, when she was unable to continue to appear in The Queen of Spades due to her condition, Nikolay refused to sing with a substitute soprano, and so the opera was removed from the program until Medea was able to return.

The Figners also created the title soprano role and that of the tenor part of Count Vaudémont in Tchaikovsky's opera Iolanta in 1892. Tchaikovsky dedicated his Six Romances, Op. 73 (1893) to Nikolay Figner. Nikolay spent time with Tchaikovsky in the days following the premiere of his Symphony No. 6 Pathetique. Later, he visited Tchaikovsky's apartment during the composer's final illness. He returned there immediately after Tchaikovsky's death, helping Nikolai Rimsky-Korsakov to lay out the body.

By no means, however, did the Figners confine their joint operatic activities to the compositions of Tchaikovsky. For example, they created the main roles in Eduard Nápravník's Dubrovsky and Francesca da Rimini.

Other operas in which the Figners performed as a team included: Tchaikovsky's Eugene Onegin (Nikolay's Lensky was said to have been surpassed only by Leonid Sobinov's interpretation) and The Oprichnik; Verdi's Aida, La traviata and Otello (singing in the latter work's 1889 Russian premiere); Gounod's Faust and Roméo et Juliette; Auber's Fra Diavolo; and the Russian premieres of Mascagni's Cavalleria rusticana, Puccini's Tosca and Leoncavallo's Pagliacci. Oddly, they never appeared in works written by Rimsky-Korsakov, who was the most prolific operatic composer in Tsarist Russia. It has been suggested that the reason for this gap in their repertoire was personal: they had asked Rimsky-Korsakov to write an opera for them, or to make some changes to his existing work May Night, but the composer refused to oblige and this may have offended the Figners.

== Divorce, later lives and recorded legacy ==
Gypsy Song from Georges Bizet's opera Carmen
Performed by Medea Figner in 1910. Run time is two minutes and one second

The Figners divorced in 1904. Medea made a tour of South America and returned to continue a solo career at the Mariinsky Theatre in St. Petersburg. Her farewell performance was in the title role in Carmen in 1912.

From 1910-1915, Nikolay directed and sang with the Narodny Dom opera company in Saint Petersburg. In 1917 Nikolay moved to Ukraine, where he taught at the Kiev Conservatory. He lost most of his possessions during the Russian Revolution of 1917, and died in poverty in Kiev on 13 December 1918, aged 61.

Medea left Soviet Russia in 1930 and settled in Paris, where she died on 8 July 1952, at the age of 93.

Both of their voices can be heard on the LP anthology The Record of Singing, while a comprehensive selection of their recordings was released on compact disc by the Symposium label in 2000. This double set of CDs bears the catalogue numbers 1255/1256.

Importantly, Medea Mei-Figner recorded "Lisa's aria" from The Queen of Spades with the alternative low ending sanctioned by the composer. She also made discs of "Vissi d'arte" from Tosca and arias from Werther and Carmen, as well as recording a number of songs, including "Penso" by Paolo Tosti. Her voice was considered by contemporary critics to be more beautiful and more impressive than that of her husband. He was already past his vocal prime when he and his wife cut their first series of 78-rpm records in St Petersburg in 1901–02 for EMI's predecessor, the Gramophone & Typewriter Company.

The Danish journalist Knut de Hageman-Lindenkrone conducted a long recorded interview with Medea Mei at her Parisian apartment in 1949, when the singer was 90 years old. The interview is in French, although Medea Mei may be heard to speak as well in Italian and Russian with her daughter, who was also present. She even sings a few bars of music here and there, including both the first phrase and the last from Liza's aria, 'Midnight is Approaching', from Tchaikovsky's The Queen of Spades, which she had created 59 years before.

This hour-long interview, with memories of Tchaikovsky and other events of Mme Mei's Saint-Petersburg career, was included in a Rubini Records set of two long-playing records, c. 1975, that also featured Medea Mei-Figner's complete commercially recorded output from the beginning of the 20th century.
