= Ermler =

Ermler is a surname. Notable people with the surname include:

- Fridrikh Ermler (1898–1967), Soviet fiIm director, actor, and screenwriter
- Mark Ermler (1932–2002), Russian conductor

== See also ==
- Erler
