= The Noblewoman Vera Sheloga =

Opera by Nikolai Rimsky-Korsakov

- Opera by Nikolai Rimsky-Korsakov
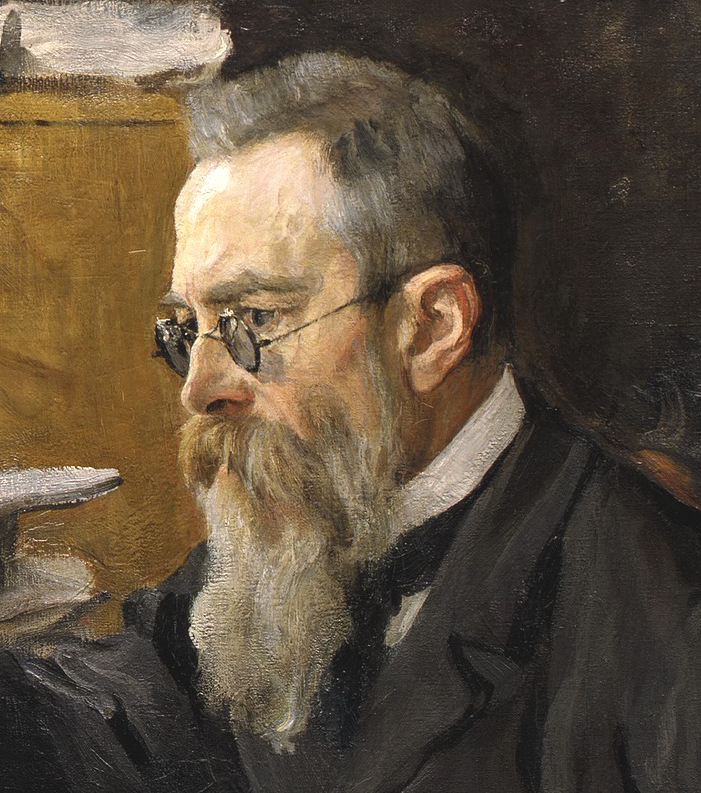
- The composer in 1898
- Native title: Russian: Боярыня Вера Шелога, Boyarïnya Vera Sheloga
- Librettist: Rimsky-Korsakov
- Language: Russian
- Based on: drama by Lev Mei
- Premiere: 27 December 1898; Solodovnikov Theater, Moscow

The Noblewoman Vera Sheloga (Russian: Боярыня Вера Шелога, romanized: Boyarïnya Vera Sheloga) is an opera in one act by Nikolai Rimsky-Korsakov. Rimsky-Korsakov wrote the libretto, which he based on the first act of the play The Maid of Pskov by Lev Alexandrovich Mey. The opera was composed in 1898, based on the prologue composed by Rimsky-Korsakov for the second version of his setting of the play as an opera. The first and third versions of the opera The Maid of Pskov omit the action and material of the prologue.

The work was first performed in Moscow in 1898. It was later used as a prologue to The Maid of Pskov in a 1901 performance.

== Performance history ==
The premiere performance took place in Moscow on 27 December 1898 at the Solodovnikov Theater. As a one-act opera, it was introduced to the US on 9 May 1922 in New York.

== Roles ==
Role	Voice type	Premiere cast Moscow, 27 December 1898 (Conductor: Iosif Truffi)
Boyar Ivan Semyonovich Sheloga	basso	Nikolay Mutin
Vera Dmitriyevna, his wife	soprano	Sofiya Gladkaya
Nadezhda Nasonova, Vera's sister	mezzo-soprano	Yevdokiya Stefanovich
Prince Yuriy Ivanovich Tokmakov	baritone or bass	Anton Bedlevich
Vlasyevna, Nadezhda's nurse	contralto	Varvara Strakhova

== Synopsis ==
Place: Pskov, Russia.
Time: 1555

Vera's husband has been away on a campaign. In the meantime, she has given birth to Olga.

She confesses to her unmarried sister, Nadezhda, of having been wooed by a man who passed through earlier (the man is Ivan the Terrible; this is not revealed in the libretto of this opera, but is the matter of the opera The Maid of Pskov to which this is a prequel), and that the baby is not her husband's.

As this conversation ends, Vera's husband finally returns, surprised by the presence of the baby. Upon his demand to know where the baby came from, Nadezhda saves her sister by claiming to be the mother.

== Recordings ==
Audio Recordings (Mainly studio recordings)

Source: www.operadis-opera-discography.org.uk

- 1947, Semyon Sakharov (conductor), Bolshoi Theatre Orchestra, Sofia Panova (Vera Sheloga), Elena Gribova (Nadezhda), Maria Levina (Vlasevna), Vladimir Gavryushov(Boyar Sheloga), Nikolai Shchegolkov (Prince Tokmakov)
- 1980, Stoyan Angelov (conductor), Bulgarian Radio Symphony Orchestra, Stefka Evstatieva (Vera Sheloga), Alexandrina Milcheva-Nonova (Nadezhda), Stefka Mineva (Vlasevna), Peter Bakardzhiev (Boyar Sheloga), Dimiter Stanchev (Prince Tokmakov)
- 1985, Mark Ermler (conductor), Bolshoi Theatre Orchestra, Tamara Milashkina (Vera Sheloga), Olga Teryushnova (Nadezhda), Nina Grigorieva (Vlasevna), Vladimir Karimov (Boyar Sheloga/Prince Tokmakov)
