= The Oprichnik =

1874 opera by Pyotr Ilyich Tchaikovsky

- Opera by Tchaikovsky
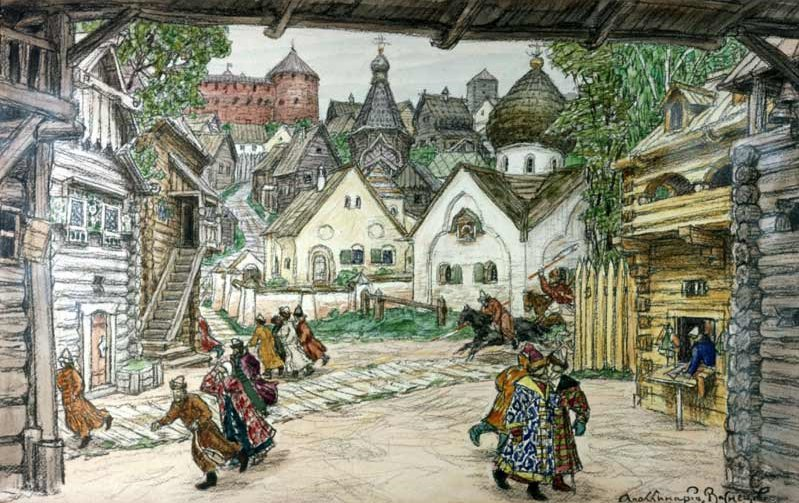
- Apollinary Vasnetsov's set design for a 1911 production at Bakhrushin Museum, Moscow
- Native title: Russian: Опричник
- Librettist: Tchaikovsky
- Language: Russian
- Based on: The Oprichniks by Ivan Lazhechnikov
- Premiere: 24 April 1874; Mariinsky Theatre, Saint Petersburg

The Oprichnik (Russian: «Опричник», IPA: [ɐˈprʲitɕnʲɪk]), also translated as The Guardsman, is an opera in 4 acts, 5 scenes, by Pyotr Ilyich Tchaikovsky to his own libretto after the tragedy The Oprichniks (Russian: Опричники) by Ivan Lazhechnikov (1792–1869). The subject of the opera is the oprichniks. It is set in Ivan the Terrible's court during the oprichnina times (1565–1573).

Tchaikovsky worked on the opera from February 1870 - March 1872. It includes music from his early opera The Voyevoda (1869). The work is dedicated to the Grand Duke Konstantin Nikolayevich Romanov. It was given its premiere performance at the Mariinsky Theatre in St Petersburg on 24 April 1874, followed by the Moscow premiere on 16 May 1874 at the Bolshoi Theatre.

== Roles ==
Role	Voice type	Premiere cast, St. Petersburg 24 April (12 April O.S.) 1874 (Conductor: Eduard Nápravník)	Premiere cast, Moscow 16 May (4 May O.S.) 1874 (Conductor: Eduard Merten)
Prince Zhemchuzhnïy	bass	Vladimir Vasilyev	Demidov
Natalya, his daughter	soprano	Wilhelmina Raab	Smelskaya
Molchan Mitkov, the bridegroom of Natalya	bass	V. F. Sobolev	
Boyarïnya Morozova, the widow	mezzo-soprano	Aleksandra Krutikova	Kadmina
Andrey Morozov, her son	tenor	D. A. Orlov	Aleksandr Dodonov
Basmanov, a young oprichnik	contralto	V. M. Vasilyev	Aristova
Prince Vyazminsky	baritone	Ivan Melnikov	Radonezhsky
Zakharyevna	soprano	Olga Shreder (Schröder)	
Chorus, silent roles: People

== Instrumentation ==
Source: Tchaikovsky Research

- Strings: Violins I, Violins II, Violas, Cellos, and Double Basses
- Woodwinds: Piccolo, 2 Flutes, 2 Oboes, 2 Clarinets (in B-flat, and A), 2 bassoons
- Brass: 4 Horns (in F), 2 Trumpets (in D, F, and C), 3 Trombones, Tuba
- Percussion: Timpani, Triangle, Cymbals, Bass Drum
- Other: Harp

== Synopsis ==
Introduction.

=== Act 1 ===
No. 1 — Scena
No. 2 — Chorus of Maidens
No. 2a – Natalya's Song
No. 3 — Scena & Chorus
No. 4 — Scena & Chorus
No. 5 — Recitatives
No. 5a – Basmanov's Arioso
No. 6 — Natalya's Arioso
No. 6a – Chorus of Maidens

=== Act 2 ===
Entr'acte

No. 7 — Scena & Morozova's Aria
No. 8 — Scena & Duet
No. 9 — Prelude, Scena & Finale
No. 9a – Prince Vyazminsky's Aria
No. 9b – Andrey's Aria

=== Act 3 ===
Entr'acte

No. 10 - Chorus of People
No. 11 - Recitatives, Chorus of Boys & Duet
No. 12 - Scena
No. 12a - Natalya's Arioso
No. 13 - Finale

=== Act 4 ===
No. 14 - Wedding Chorus
No. 15 - Dances of Oprichniks & Women
No. 16 - Recitatives, Chorus & Duet
No. 17 - Chorus & Scena
No. 18 - Scena & Quartet
No. 19 - Closing Scena

Note: The entr'acte to Act II may have been written and scored by Vladimir Shilovsky.

== Derived works ==
Arrangements by the composer

- Numbers from the opera for voices with piano accompaniment (1873)
- Funeral March on Themes from the Opera The Oprichnik (1877, lost)

== Recordings ==
- 1948, Alexei Korolyov (Prince Zhemchuzny), Natalya Rozhdestvenskaya (Natalya), Vsevolod Tyutyunnik (Molchan Mitkov), Lyudmila Legostayeva (Boyarina Morozova), Dmitri Tarkhov (Andrei Morozov), Zara Dolukhanova (Basmanov), Konstantin Polyaev (Prince Vyazminsky), Antonina Kleschtschova (Zakharyevna). Moscow Radio Choir and Orchestra, Aleksander Orlov (conductor). Melodiya, reissued Pristine Classics
- 1980, Evgeny Vladimirov (Prince Zhemchuzny), Tamara Milashkina (Natalya), Vladimir Matorin (Molchan Mitkov), Larisa Nikitina (Boyarina Morozova), Lev Kuznetsov (Andrei Morozov), Raisa Kotova (Basmanov), Oleg Klyonov (Prince Vyazminsky), Nina Derbina (Zakharyevna). Chorus and Orchestra of the Central Television and Radio of the USSR, Gennady Provatorov (conductor). Aquarius.
- 2003, Vassily Savenko (Prince Zhemchuzhny), Elena Lassoskaya (Natalya), Dmitri Ulyanov (Molchan Mitkov), Irina Dolzhenko (Boyarina Morozova), Vsevolod Grivnov (Andrei Morozov), Alexandra Durseneva (Basmanov), Vladimir Ognovienko (Prince Vyazminsky), Cinzia de Mola (Zakharyevna). Orchestra e Coro del Teatro Lirico di Cagliari, Gennady Rozhdestvensky (conductor). Dynamic, reissued Brilliant.
