= Yevgeny Akulov =

Soviet conductor

Yevgeny Akulov, first name often spelled Yevgeni or Evgeni, (Russian: Евгений Акулов) was a Soviet conductor. He was noted for his conducting of the opera The Golden Cockerel with Aleksei Kovalev in 1962 and his conducting for the Moscow Radio Large Symphony Orchestra, the USSR TV and Radio Operatic and Symphonic Orchestra and Ivan Petrov Orchestras.
