= Ivan Lazhechnikov =

Russian writer (1792–1869)

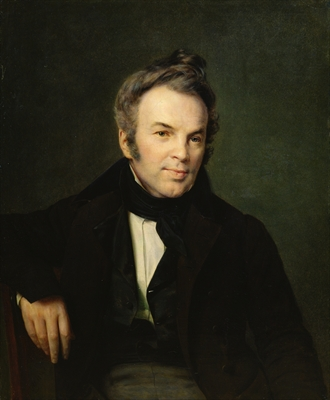
- Portrait, 1837
- Born: September 25, 1792; Kolomna, Moscow Governorate, Russian Empire
- Died: July 8, 1869 (aged 76); Moscow, Russia
- Occupations: novelist, playwright

Ivan Ivanovich Lazhechnikov (Russian: Ива́н Ива́нович Лаже́чников; September 25, 1792 – July 8, 1869) was a Russian writer.

== Biography ==
Lazhechnikov was born into the family of a rich merchant in Kolomna in 1792. He received a well-rounded education from private tutors at home. He served in the active army in 1813–15, which inspired his Campaign Notes of a Russian Officer.

Lazhechnikov was one of the originators of the Russian historical novel, along with Faddey Bulgarin, Mikhail Zagoskin and others. His first novel, The Last Novik (1831–33), set in the early 18th century, was very successful. His novel The House of Ice (1835) dealt with the intrigues and horrors of the court of Empress Anna. The novel was praised by the influential critic Vissarion Belinsky for its authentic portrayal of the details of the period’s social climate. The Infidel, a novel set in the time of Ivan III, was translated into English as The Heretic. He also published several historical dramas including Oprichnik (1843, published in 1859), on which the libretto of Tchaikovsky’s opera is based.

Lazhechnikov died in Moscow in 1869.

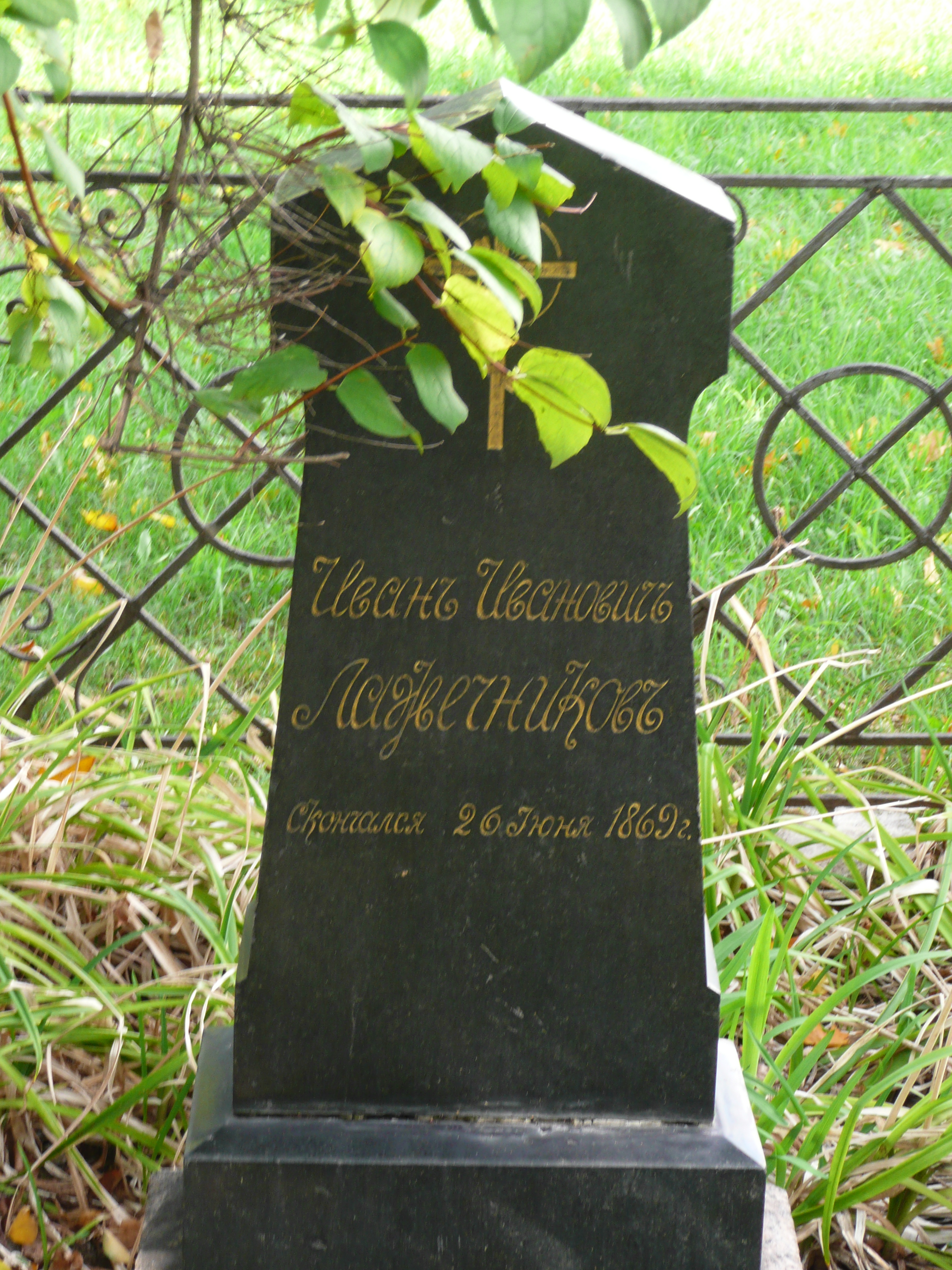
Lazhechnikov's grave in the Novodevichy Cemetery

== English translations ==
- The Heretic, (3 vols), William Blackwood and Sons, 1845. from Archive.org

== See also ==
- List of Russian-language writers
- Russian literature
