= Biserka Cvejić =

Serbian operatic singer and academic (1923–2021)

- Бисерка Цвејић
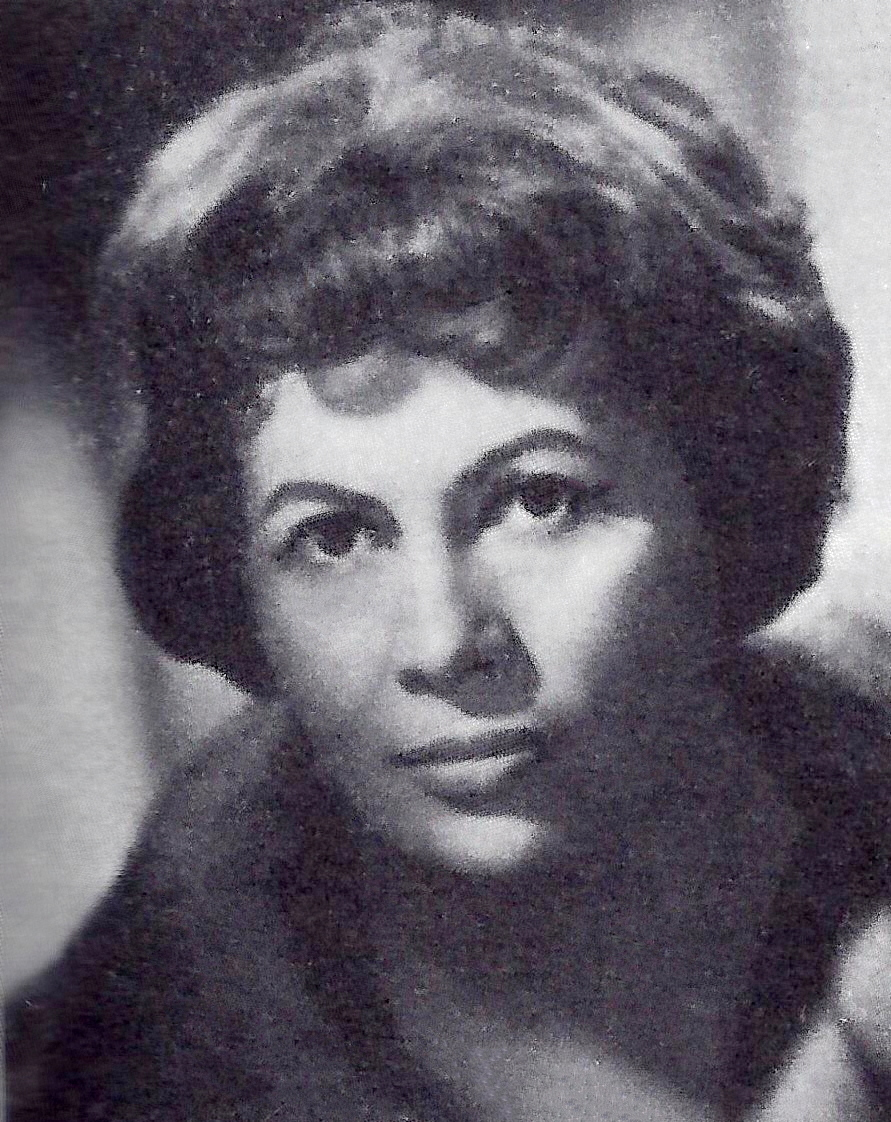
- Biserka Cvejić in 1966
- Born: Biserka Katušić; 5 November 1923; Jesenice, Kingdom of Serbs, Croats and Slovenes
- Died: 7 January 2021 (aged 97); Belgrade, Serbia
- Occupations: Operatic mezzo-soprano; Academic teacher
- Organizations: Vienna State Opera; University of Arts in Belgrade
- Title: Kammersängerin
- Spouse: Dušan Cvejić
- Awards: Order of Danica Hrvatska; Legion of Honor

Biserka Cvejić (née Katušić; Serbian Cyrillic: Бисерка Цвејић, née Катушић; 5 November 1923 – 7 January 2021) was a Serbian operatic mezzo-soprano and contralto, and university professor. Her career began at the Belgrade Opera in 1954. She was a member of the Vienna State Opera from 1959 to 1979, performing internationally. She first appeared at the Metropolitan Opera in 1961 as Amneris in Verdi's Aida, returning in many more leading roles of the Italian and French repertoire.

== Early life and education ==
Born Biserka Katušić in Jesenice, near Split, she grew up in Ougrée, Belgium. After the end of World War II, she left Belgium to return to her birth country, travelling concealed on a freight train with the help of an American soldier. Arriving in Belgrade, she met her future husband, Dr. Dušan Cvejić, an otorhinolaryngologist. She initially worked as a translator, and studied voice at the Academy of Music in Belgrade with José Riavez (or Josip Rijavec) until 1953.

== Career ==
In 1950, while still a student, she substituted at the Belgrade Opera as Maddalena in Verdi's Rigoletto. She made her official debut at the house in 1954, under the name Biserka Tzveych, as Charlotte in Massenet's Werther, and stayed with the Belgrade Opera until 1959. She made recordings with Decca in 1955, singing roles in four Russian operas, including Olga in Tchaikovsky's Eugene Onegin.

Cvejić first appeared at the Vienna State Opera in 1959 as Amneris in Verdi's Aida, becoming a member the following year. She remained at the house until 1979, appearing in 25 roles and 372 performances, including the title role of Bizet's Carmen which became a signature role. She also appeared as Marcellina in Mozart's Le nozze di Figaro, Preciosilla in Verdi's La forza del destino, Brangäne in Wagner's Tristan und Isolde and Herodias in Salome by Richard Strauss.

Cvejić made her house debut at the Metropolitan Opera on 14 April 1961, again as Amneris in Verdi's Aida, alongside Birgit Nilsson in the title role. A reviewer noted in the New York Herald Tribune that she "was duly regal as well as attractive in appearance, and her voice gave an impression both of generous volume and appropriate warmth, while both in song and demeanor she realized the expressive resources and range of her role". Her second role there was in 1963 as the Princess in Cilea's Adriana Lecouvreur, with Renata Tebaldi and Franco Corelli in the leading roles. The same year, she sang Ulrica in Verdi's Un ballo in maschera, alongside Gladys Kuchta and Richard Tucker as the lovers. In 1964, she appeared as Eboli in Don Carlo, with Tucker in the title role, and Giorgio Tozzi as Philipp II of Spain, and the same year as Azucena in Il trovatore, conducted by Thomas Schippers. Later that year, she performed there as Giulietta in Offenbach's Les contes d'Hoffmann, with Nicolai Gedda in the title role. In 1965, she appeared in the title role of Samson et Dalila, with Jon Vickers as Samson, and Georges Prêtre conducting. She performed as Laura in a new production of Ponchielli's La Gioconda on 22 November 1966, again with Tebaldi and Corelli, and conducted by Fausto Cleva.

She performed regularly at the Croatian National Theatre in Zagreb (1975–78) and also appeared at La Scala in Milan, the Verona Arena, Teatro di San Carlo in Naples, Teatro Colón in Buenos Aires, and the Royal Opera House in London.

Cvejić had a dark-timbred, beautifully formed contralto voice, which Roksanda Pejović describes in her entry in Grove's as "even, polished, technically assured". She was also an excellent oratorio singer. She retired from the stage in 1990. After retirement, she taught singing, and was a professor at the faculty of the University of Arts in Belgrade and the Musical Academy in Novi Sad, Serbia. Several of her students became famous, such as the baritone Željko Lučić.

== Awards and honours ==
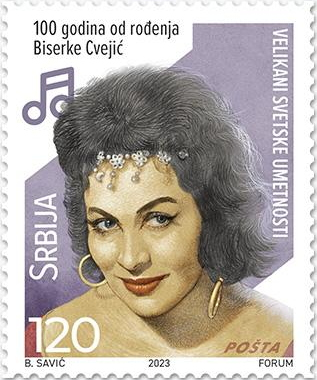
Cvejić on a 2023 stamp of Serbia

She was awarded the Medal of Arts and Letters of Serbia, was awarded in 1979 the title Austrian Kammersängerin, and was a laureate of the French Legion of Honor in 2001.

== Personal life ==
Cvejić died at the age of 97 in Belgrade.

== Recordings ==
=== Decca ===
- Tchaikovsky: Olga in Eugen Onegin
- Tchaikovsky: Polina in Pique Dame
- Borodin: Nurse in Fürst Igor
- Mussorgsky: Hostess in Boris Godunow
- Rimsky-Korsakov: Snegourotchka

=== MGM-Heliodor ===
- Prokofiev: War and Peace

=== Jugoton ===
- Opera arias

=== Electrola ===
- Johann Strauss II: Der Zigeunerbaron
