= Ivan Melnikov (baritone) =

Russian opera singer (1832–1906)

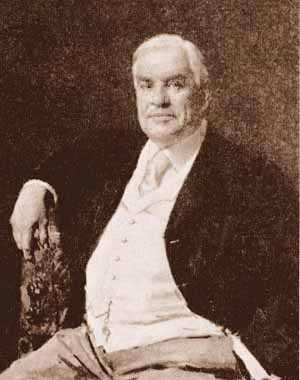
Ivan Melnikov, 1890s

Ivan Aleksandrovich Melnikov (Russian: Иван Александрович Мельников; March 4, 1832 – July 8, 1906) was a Russian baritone opera singer.

== Early years and training ==
Melnikov was trained as a choirboy in his youth. In 1861, he began studying with Gavriil Lomakin, and participated from 1862 until 1866 in the Free Music School concerts conducted by Lomakin. Melnikov continued his studies in Milan with a master of bel canto, E. Repetto.

== Career ==
In 1867, Melnikov made a triumphant St. Petersburg debut at Mariinsky Theatre, performing the role of Riccardo in Bellini's I puritani. Melnikov appeared regularly at the Mariinsky, in both foreign and Russian roles, and was the first interpreter of more than dozen roles in Russian opera. Melnikov sang in every opera by Pyotr Ilyich Tchaikovsky except for Iolanta, creating roles in four of Tchaikovsky's operas: Prince Vyazminsky in The Oprichnik (1874), Devil in Cherevichki (1886), Prince Kurlyatev in The Enchantress (1887), and Tomsky in The Queen of Spades (1890).

== Notable roles ==
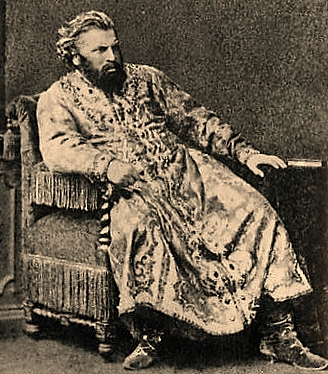
Melnikov as Tsar Boris in Boris Godunov (1874)

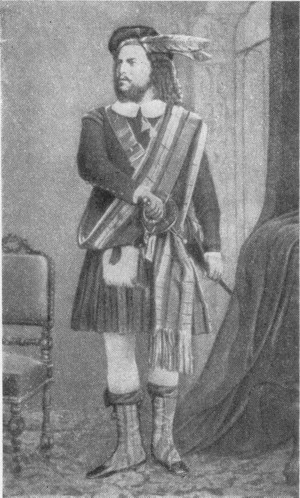
Melnikov in the title role of William Ratcliff (1869)

- Amonasro in Aida (Giuseppe Verdi)
- Tsar Boris in Boris Godunov (Mussorgsky)
- The Devil in Cherevichki (Tchaikovsky)
- The Demon in The Demon (Rubinstein)
- Prince Nikita Kurlyatev in The Enchantress (Tchaikovsky)
- Prince Yuriy Ivanovich Tokmakov in The Maid of Pskov (Nikolai Rimsky-Korsakov)
- Kalenik in May Night (Rimsky-Korsakov)
- Vasyl Kochubey in Mazeppa (Tchaikovsky)
- Prince Igor in Prince Igor (Borodin)
- Prince Vyazminsky in The Oprichnik (Tchaikovsky)
- Tomsky in The Queen of Spades (Tchaikovsky)
- The Miller in Rusalka (Alexander Dargomyzhsky)
- Ruslan in Ruslan and Lyudmila (Mikhail Glinka) He was described by celebrated critic Vladimir Stasov as "the greatest of the Ruslans."
- William Ratcliff in William Ratcliff (César Cui)
- Wolfram in Tannhäuser (Richard Wagner)
