= Yelizaveta Lavrovskaya =

Russian singer

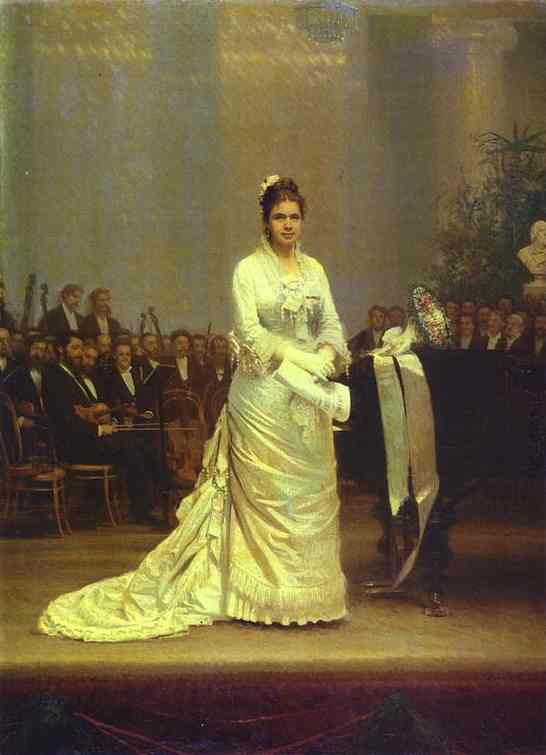
Portrait of Lavrovskaya on stage, 1878, by Ivan Kramskoi

Yelizaveta Andreyevna Lavrovskaya (Russian: Елизавета Андреевна Лавровская; 13 October [O.S. 1 October] 1845 (Note: Russia was still using old style dates in the 19th century, and information sources used in the article sometimes report dates as old style rather than new style. Dates in the article are taken verbatim from the source and therefore are in the same style as the source from which they come.) – February 4, 1919) was a Russian mezzo-soprano praised for her dramatic performances of operatic arias and her sensitive interpretations of lieder.

An acquaintance of composer Pyotr Ilyich Tchaikovsky, she suggested that he compose an opera based on Alexander Pushkin's verse-play Eugene Onegin. Tchaikovsky followed her suggestion; the result was what is often considered the composer's finest opera.

== Life and career ==
Born in Kashin, Lavrovskaya studied first at the Elizabeth Institute in Moscow under Fenzi, then at the Saint Petersburg Conservatory under Henriette Nissen-Saloman. The Grand Duchess Yelena Pavlovna, the German-born aunt of Tsar Alexander II of Russia and royal sponsor of both the Russian Musical Society and the Saint Petersburg Conservatory, was impressed by Lavrovskaya's performance in a student presentation of Christoph Willibald Gluck's opera Orfeo ed Euridice. She sent Lavroskaya to Paris in 1867 to study with French mezzo-soprano Pauline Viardot. Upon her return in 1868, Lavroskaya was engaged by the Saint Petersburg Imperial Opera, making her professional debut as Vanya in Mikhail Glinka's opera A Life for the Tsar. Lavrovskaya later sang Ratmir in Ruslan and Lyudmila, along with many other mezzo-soprano roles, including Carmen and Mignon. She stayed with the company four years, after which she went to Paris for further studies with Viardot and to further develop her concert career. After a series of European tours, she was re-engaged by the Saint Petersburg Imperial Opera, singing there from 1878 to 1902. She also appeared at the Bolshoi Theatre in Moscow during the 1890 season.

Lavrovskaya was also well known as a recitalist, not only in Russia but also in Western Europe, singing at the Monday Popular Concerts at the Crystal Palace in London in 1873 and at the Paris Exhibition of 1878. In 1870, she premiered Tchaikovsky's song, "None but the lonely heart" in Moscow, following it with its Saint Petersburg premiere the following year during an all-Tchaikovsky concert hosted by Nikolai Rubinstein; the latter was the first concert devoted entirely to Tchaikovsky's works. Lavrovskaya was much admired by Tchaikovsky, who dedicated his Six Romances, Op. 27 to her, and by Mily Balakirev at whose Russian Musical Society and Free Music School concerts she was a regular guest artist. Sergei Rachmaninoff dedicated two of his Op. 15 songs to Lavrovskaya, "She is lovely as the noon" and "In my soul" ["Love's flame"].

In 1877, during a conversation with Tchaikovsky on possible opera subjects, Lavrovskaya suggested Onegin. "The idea seemed wild and I didn't reply", the composer later wrote his brother Modest. "Later, while dining alone at an inn, I recalled Onegin, fell to thinking about it, next began to find Lavrovskaya's idea a possibility, then was carried away by it, and by the end of the meal had made up my mind. Straightway I ran off to track down a Pushkin. I found one with difficulty, set off home, read it through with delight, and passed an utterly sleepless night, the result of which was the scenario of a delightful opera on Pushkin's text."

In 1871, Lavrovskaya married Prince Tsertelev. In 1888, she became professor of singing at the Moscow Conservatory. Tchaikovsky considered her to be an "excellent" teacher. She died in Saint Petersburg (then called Petrograd) in 1919.

=== Lavrovskaya's recorded voice ===
The following recording was made in Moscow in January 1890, by Julius Block on behalf of Thomas Edison.

Lavrovskaya's voice

| Anton Rubinstein: | What a wonderful thing. | Какая прекрасная вещь ....хорошо... (in Russian) | Kakaya prekrasnaya veshch' ....khorosho... |
| Julius Block: | At last. | Наконец-то. | Nakonets-to. |
| Yelizaveta Lavrovskaya: | You're ******* disgusting. How dare you call me crafty? | Противный *** да как вы смеете называть меня коварной? | Protivnyy *** da kak vy smeyete nazyvat' menya kovarnoy? |
| Vasily Safonov: | (sings) |
| Pyotr Tchaikovsky: | This trill could be better. | Эта трель могла бы быть и лучше. | Eta trel' mogla by byt' i luchshe. |
| Lavrovskaya: | (sings) |
| Tchaikovsky: | Block is a good fellow, but Edison is even better. | Блок молодец, но у Эдисона ещё лучше! | Blok molodets, no u Edisona yeshchyo luchshe! |
| Lavrovskaya: | (sings) A-o, a-o. | А-о, а-о. | A-o, a-o. |
| Safonov: | Peter Jurgenson in Moscow. | Peter Jurgenson in Moskau. (in German) | Peter Jurgenson in Moskau. |
| Tchaikovsky: | Who's speaking now? It seems like Safonov's voice. | Кто сейчас говорит? Кажется голос Сафонова. | Kto seychas govorit? Kazhetsya golos Safonova. |
| Safonov: | (whistles) |

Block also recorded Lavrovskaya singing two solo pieces (one song by Tchaikovsky, and another unidentified composition).
