= Vladimir Atlantov =

Soviet and Russian operatic tenor

- Владимир Атлантов
- Born: February 19, 1939; Leningrad, Russian SFSR, Soviet Union (now Saint Petersburg)
- Occupation: Operatic tenor

Vladimir Andreyevich Atlantov (Note: Russian: Владимир Андреевич Атлантов, romanized: Vladimir Andreyevich Atlantov) (born 19 February 1939) is a Soviet and Russian operatic tenor.

Born in Leningrad, Atlantov is the son of bass Andrey Petrovich (1906–1971) who sang in both the Kirov and Maly opera theaters of Leningrad. His mother, Maria Aleksandrovna Yelizarova, was a lyric soprano who performed in the same opera theaters, taught, and later was a vocal consultant in the Kirov theater. She was awarded the title of the Honored Artist of the RSFSR.

Atlantov grew up in the wings of the opera theater. At the age of six, he joined the Glinka choir school and in 1957 he was accepted in the Leningrad Conservatory. In 1962, while still a student, he was hired as an intern in the Kirov theater. The same year he was awarded the silver medal at the Glinka vocal competition and was allowed to go to Milan, Italy to study at the Teatro alla Scala. Together with other Russian singers he studied with E. Barra and E Piazza. In two years at La Scala, Atlantov learned the parts of the Duke in Rigoletto, Rodolfo in La bohème, Riccardo in Un ballo in maschera, and Cavaradossi in Tosca.

After his return from Italy, Atlantov sang Alvaro in the Kirov opera's La forza del destino. Sol Hurok heard him in the part and invited him to sing at the New York Metropolitan Opera which would have been Atlantov's first foreign tour. However, the official permission for the tour never came.

1966 saw Atlantov as Gherman in Tchaikovsky's The Queen of Spades. The same year he became the first prize winner at the 3rd Tchaikovsky Competition in Moscow. After that Atlantov, was transferred to the Bolshoy Theater in Moscow. His first operas there were La traviata and Eugene Onegin.

External audio
- Vladimir Atlantov as Herman in Pyotr Ilyich Tchaikovsky's opera Pique Dame, Op. 68 with Mirella Freni and Seiji Ozawa conducting the Boston Symphony Orchestra in 1992 on archive.org

In 1967 Atlantov won the first prize at the 3rd International Competition in Sofia and the fourth prize winner at the International competition in Montreal, Quebec, Canada. He also went to Milan with the Bolshoy Theater.

While at the Bolshoy, Atlantov sang 18 roles, 13 of which were new for him. One of his best roles became Otello. In 1978 he was one of seven tenors invited to sing in the Teatro San Carlo in Naples on the occasion of Enrico Caruso's 100th anniversary. In 1987, he was named a Kammersänger of the Vienna opera.

In 1988, Atlantov left Russia and the Bolshoy Opera, and continued his career in Europe. Parts that he sang most often in the best opera houses of the world were Gherman, Canio, and Otello.

Video record of his performances: Sadko – Bolshoy, 1975; The Queen of Spades – Bolshoy, 1982; Otello – Arena di Verona, 1982; Khovanshchina – Vienna, 1989; The Queen of Spades – Vienna, 1991.

== Personal life ==
Altlantov was first married to the pianist Farida Khalilova; they had a daughter, Lada Atlantova (b. 1963). His second wife was the operatic soprano Tamara Milashkina. She was awarded the title the People's Artist of the USSR as well as the State Award of the Russian SSR.
