= Stefania Toczyska =

Polish mezzo-soprano

Stefania Toczyska (née Krzywińska), born in Grudziądz, Poland, on 19 February 1943, is a Polish mezzo-soprano of international repute.

She lived in Toruń, where she attended the Music School ("little conservatory"). There, she married Romuald Toczyski, a music teacher. She moved in 1968 with her family to Gdańsk in order to pursue her higher education. There she studied voice in the Higher Music School (the subsequent Academy of Music) in the class of Barbara Iglikowska, receiving her final diploma (with distinction) in 1973. But even before that, during studies, she was building her career by winning awards in international vocal competitions in Toulouse (1971), Paris (1972) and 's-Hertogenbosch (1973).

Her debut occurred in 1973, on the stage of the Baltic State Opera House in Gdańsk, in the title role of Carmen, and her fame and prestige began accordingly.

Initially, her activity was centered locally in Gdańsk, where she kept her position as the leading soloist in the Baltic State Opera, making also frequent guest visits to other opera houses. In 1975, the Baltic State Opera produced, especially for her, Samson et Dalila in 1975 (that same production seen also the next year in Warsaw), and La favorite by Donizetti in 1978 (also seen in Bremen the next year).

Her first appearance outside of Poland took place in Basel, when she sang the role of Amneris in Aïda, in 1977. Soon after, with her international career established, she gave a farewell performance in Gdańsk on 15 July 1979, as Dalila, no longer singing regularly for the Baltic State Opera, eventually moving out of Poland and establishing her permanent residency in Vienna, her career centered from now on at the Staatsoper.

From there, she made frequent guest visits to sing on stages of various opera houses around the world, including her native country, particularly at the Teatr Wielki, Warsaw.

On 16 September 1979 she made her American stage debut in the San Francisco Opera, as Laura in La Gioconda (with Renata Scotto and Luciano Pavarotti), which was telecast "live" around the world. She made her first appearance at Royal Opera House in 1983 (as Amneris in Aïda), and also sang at the Teatro Colón, in Buenos Aires.

In 1988, Toczyska made her Metropolitan Opera debut, as Marfa in Mussourgsky's Khovanshchina. She went on to sing there in Aida, Il trovatore, La Gioconda, Boris Godunov (as Marina Mnichek), Un ballo in maschera (as Ulrica), Rusalka (as Jezibaba) and Adriana Lecouvreur (as the Principessa di Bouillon), with her last performance there, in 1997.

Her discography includes recordings of Il trovatore (as Azucena, opposite Katia Ricciarelli, José Carreras and Yury Mazurok, conducted by Sir Colin Davis, 1980) and Prokofiev's War and Peace (with Galina Vishnevskaya, conducted by Mstislav Rostropovich, 1986). She has also recorded the Polish songs by Frédéric Chopin, with Janusz Olejniczak. Toczyska's performance as Amneris in Aida at Los Angeles Opera was published on DVD.

Her latest roles include King Roger (Warsaw, 2004), Salome (Herodias, Warsaw 2005), Haunted Manor (Czesnikova, Warsaw 2007), Prokofiev's The Gambler (as Babulenka, in Berlin, 2008) and Mamma Lucia in Cavalleria rusticana (Paris 2012, Salzburg 2015).
