= The Maid of Pskov =

Opera by Nikolai Rimsky-Korsakov

The Maid of Pskov (Pskovityanka)
- Opera by Nikolai Rimsky-Korsakov
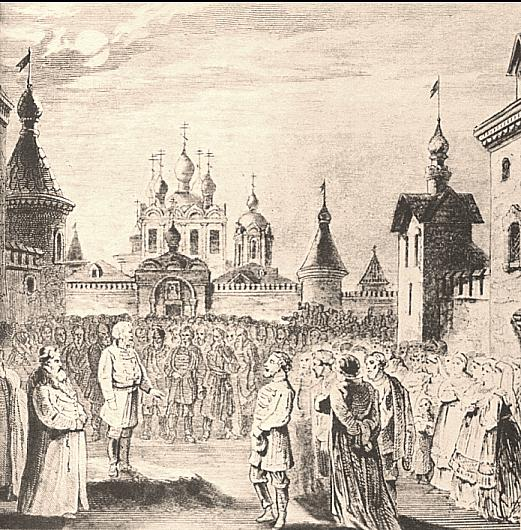
- Design by Matvey Shishkov for the premiere
- Native title: Russian: Псковитянка, Pskovityanka
- Librettist: Rimsky-Korsakov
- Language: Russian
- Based on: drama by Lev Mei
- Premiere: 1873; Mariinsky Theatre, St. Petersburg

The Maid of Pskov (Russian: Псковитянка, romanized: Pskovityanka, lit. 'Pskov female resident'), also known as Ivan the Terrible, is an 1872 opera originally in three acts (six scenes) by Nikolai Rimsky-Korsakov. The libretto is by the composer, after the play by Lev Mei.

The storyline is fictitious, but set against the background of the campaign by Ivan IV Vasilyevich to subject the cities of Pskov and Novgorod to his will.

Pskovityanka was Rimsky-Korsakov's first opera, and he revised it twice; once in 1876-7, when he added a prologue, and again in 1891-2, without the prologue (which was subsequently rewritten and became in 1898 the one act opera Boyarïnya Vera Sheloga). The third version was made famous by Feodor Chaliapin in the role of the Tsar. The opera was introduced to Paris in 1909, also with Chaliapin, by Diaghilev, under the title Ivan the Terrible.

== Composition history ==
The first product of the composer's interest in this work was a lullaby composed in 1866. Rimsky-Korsakov then set to work in full earnest on an operatic treatment in the winter of 1867-1868. There are 3 versions of the opera. The original version was composed in the years 1868–1872, and received its premiere in 1873. The composer revised the opera in the years 1876–1877. Later he completed a final version in the years 1891–1892.

== Performance history ==
The world premiere was given in St. Petersburg on 13 January (O.S. 1 January), 1873 at the Mariinsky Theatre, conducted by Eduard Nápravník.

Other notable performances included those in 1895 in St. Petersburg's Panayevsky Theatre, given by the Society of Musical Gatherings. The Russian Private Opera performances in Moscow in 1896, conducted by Bernardi, with scenery by Korovin and Vasnetsov, included Feodor Chaliapin as Ivan the Terrible.

In 1909 at the Théâtre du Châtelet in Paris, in a Sergei Diaghilev production, the opera was conducted by Nikolai Tcherepnin and Chaliapin sang Ivan. The opera was retitled Ivan le terrible (Ivan the Terrible), on account of the dominance of his role, and because of European audience's familiarity with his name.

== Roles ==
| Role | Voice type | Premiere cast St. Petersburg 1873 | Premiere cast St. Petersburg 1895 | Premiere cast Paris 1909 |
|---|---|---|---|---|
| Tsar Ivan Vasilevich the Terrible | bass | Osip Petrov | Mikhail Koryakin | Feodor Chaliapin |
| Prince Yuriy Ivanovich Tokmakov, the tsar's deputy and posadnik in Pskov | bass | Ivan Melnikov | Mikhail Lunacharsky | Vladimir Kastorsky |
| Boyar Nikita Matuta | tenor | Vasily Vasilyev II | | Aleksandr Davïdov |
| Prince Afanasy Vyazemsky | bass | Vladimir Sobolev | | |
| Bomely (Bomelius), royal physician | bass | | | |
| Mikhail Andreyevich Tucha, son of a posadnik | tenor | Dmitriy Orlov | Vasilyev III | Vasiliy Damayev |
| Yushko Velebin, courier from Novgorod | bass | Sobolev | | Vasiliy Sharonov |
| Princess Olga Yuryevna Tokmakova | soprano | Yuliya Platonova | Feodosiya Velinskaya | Lidiya Lipkovskaya |
| Boyarïshnya Stepanida Matuta (Styosha), Olga's friend | soprano | Bulakhova | | |
| Vlasyevna, wet nurse | contralto | Darya Leonova | Alina Dore | |
| Perfilyevna, wet nurse | contralto | Olga Shryoder (Eduard Nápravník's wife) | | |
| Guard's voice | tenor | Pavlov | | |
Chorus, silent roles: Judges, Pskovian boyars, governor's sons, oprichniks, Muscovite Streltsy, maidens, people

== Synopsis ==
Time: 1570
Place: Pskov; the Pechorsky Monastery; at the Medednya River

=== Act 1 ===
Scene 1

Princess Olga, daughter of Prince Tokmakov, is in the garden, as are two nannies, who tell stories of the repressive behaviour of Tsar Ivan on Pskov's sister city, Novgorod. Mikhail Tucha, the leader of the uprising in Pskov, is beloved of Princess Olga, but she is betrothed to the boyar Nikita Matuta. After Tucha and Olga sing a love duet, Tokmakov and Matuta arrive. Tucha leaves quickly and Olga hides herself. Tokmakov tells Matuta that Olga is not his own daughter, but the child of his sister-in-law Vera Sheloga. He does not know who Olga's true father is.

Scene 2

At the square of the Pskov kremlin, a messenger from Novgorod bears news that Tsar Ivan is about to deal the same fate to Pskov that he has to Novgorod. The townspeople are initially roused to defiance, but Tokmakov tries to calm the crowd and preach submission, saying that they are innocent of any treason and thus need not fear the Tsar. Tucha and his associates plan to rebel.

=== Act 2 ===
Scene 1

The people of Pskov are in fear of the wrath of the Tsar. Olga sings of how she does not truly know of her parents. A crowd gathers and sings welcome to the Tsar.

Scene 2

At Tokmakov's residence, Tsar Ivan patronizes Tokmakov and his ideas of the city behaving independently of the Tsar. The Tsar then asks to be attended by Princess Olga. She enters, and they both react oddly at each other's appearance. When Tokmakov and Ivan are later alone in conversation, the Tsar asks about Olga and learns about the identity of her mother. Ivan is shaken to learn that Vera Sheloga is Olga's mother, and his attitude toward the city changes.

=== Act 3 ===
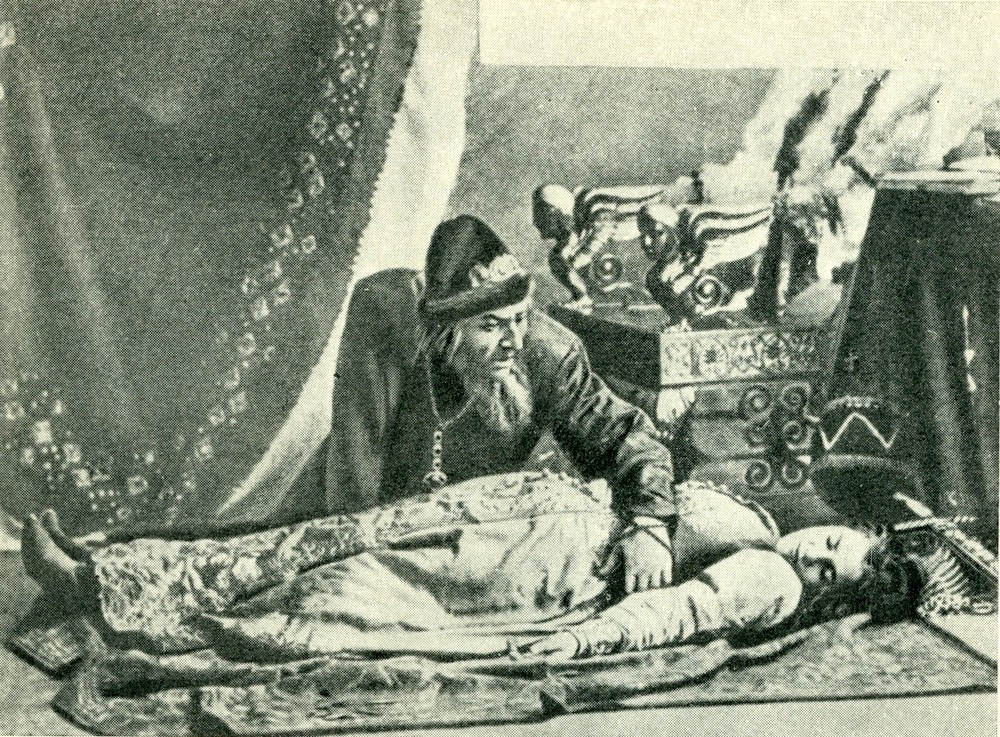
Feodor Chaliapin as Ivan IV and V. A. Eberle as Olga (Russian Private Opera, 1896)

Scene 1

In the forest, Olga and Tucha meet for a tryst. However, Matuta and his men appear, repulse Tucha and abduct Olga.

Scene 2

At a camp near the riverside, Ivan continues to think about Olga. He hears that Matuta has abducted her. Angry at this news, Ivan summons Olga, and addresses her as "Olga Ivanovna," a hint as to her true father. Olga asks for protection from Matuta. Tsar Ivan says that she will be taken to Moscow, and he will choose her groom. He says that when Tucha is captured, he will live, but imprisoned. Olga continues to plead for mercy, and says that she has always worshipped him since she was young. Tucha and his forces attack the Tsar's camp. As they are repelled, Olga is fatally shot. At the end, over her body, Ivan reveals that he is, in fact, Olga's father.

== Recordings ==
Audio Recordings

Source: www.operadis-opera-discography.org.uk

- 1947, Semyon Sakharov (conductor), Bolshoi Theatre Orchestra and Chorus, Alexander Pirogov (Tsar Ivan), Elena Shumilova (Princess Olga), Georgi Nelepp (Mikhail Tucha), Maria Levina (Vlasyevna), Margarita Shervinskaya (Perfilyevna), Natalya Sokolova (Stepanida Matuta), Nikolai Schegolkov (Prince Yuri Tokmakov), Alexander Peregudov (Boyar Nikita Matuta), Mikhail Soloviev (Prince Afanasy Vyazemsky), Ivan Skobtsov (Yushko Velebin), Ivan Manshavin (Bomelius). Aquarius - AQVR 333-2.
- 1968, Samo Hubad (conductor), Coro e Orchestra del Teatro Communale Giuseppe Verdi di Trieste, Boris Christoff (Tsar Ivan), Radmila Bakočević (Olga), Lajos Kozma (Mikhail Tucha), Genia Las (Vlasyevna), Bruna Ronchina (Perfilyevna), Daniela Mazzucato Meneghini (Stepanida Matuta), Lorenzo Gaetani (Yuri Tokmakov), Giuseppe Botta (Boyar Nikita Matuta), Enzo Viaro (Prince Afanasy Vyazemsky), Vito Susca (Yushko Velebin), Vito Susca (Bomelius). Gala - GL 100.739. (in Italian)
- 1969, Thomas Schippers (conductor), Rome Opera House Orchestra & Chorus, Boris Christoff (Tsar Ivan), Nicoletta Panni (Princess Olga), Ruggero Bondino (Mikhail Tucha), Genia Las (Vlasyevna), Fernanda Cadoni (Perfilyevna), Lidia Nerozzi (Stepanida Matuta), Lorenzo Gaetani (Prince Yuri Tokmakov), Aldo Bertocci (Boyar Nikita Matuta), Renzo Gonzales (Prince Afanasy Vyazemsky), Franco Pugliese (Yushko Velebin), Alfredo Colella (Bomelius). Opera d'Oro - OPD-1254. (in Italian)
- 1994, Valery Gergiev (conductor), Kirov Chorus and Orchestra, St. Petersburg, Vladimir Ognovienko (Tsar Ivan), Galina Gorchakova (Princess Olga), Vladimir Galusin (Mikhail Tucha), Ludmila Filatova (Vlasyevna), Evgenia Perlasova (Perfilyevna), Olga Korzhenskaya (Stepanida Matuta), Gennady Bezzubenkov (Prince Yuri Tokmakov), Nikolai Gassiev (Boyar Nikita Matuta), Evgeny Fedotov (Prince Afanasy Vyazemsky), Georgy Zastavni (Yushko Velebin), Yuri Laptev (Bomelius). Philips – 446 678-2.
