= Aleksander Orlov =

Russian opera conductor (1783–1948)

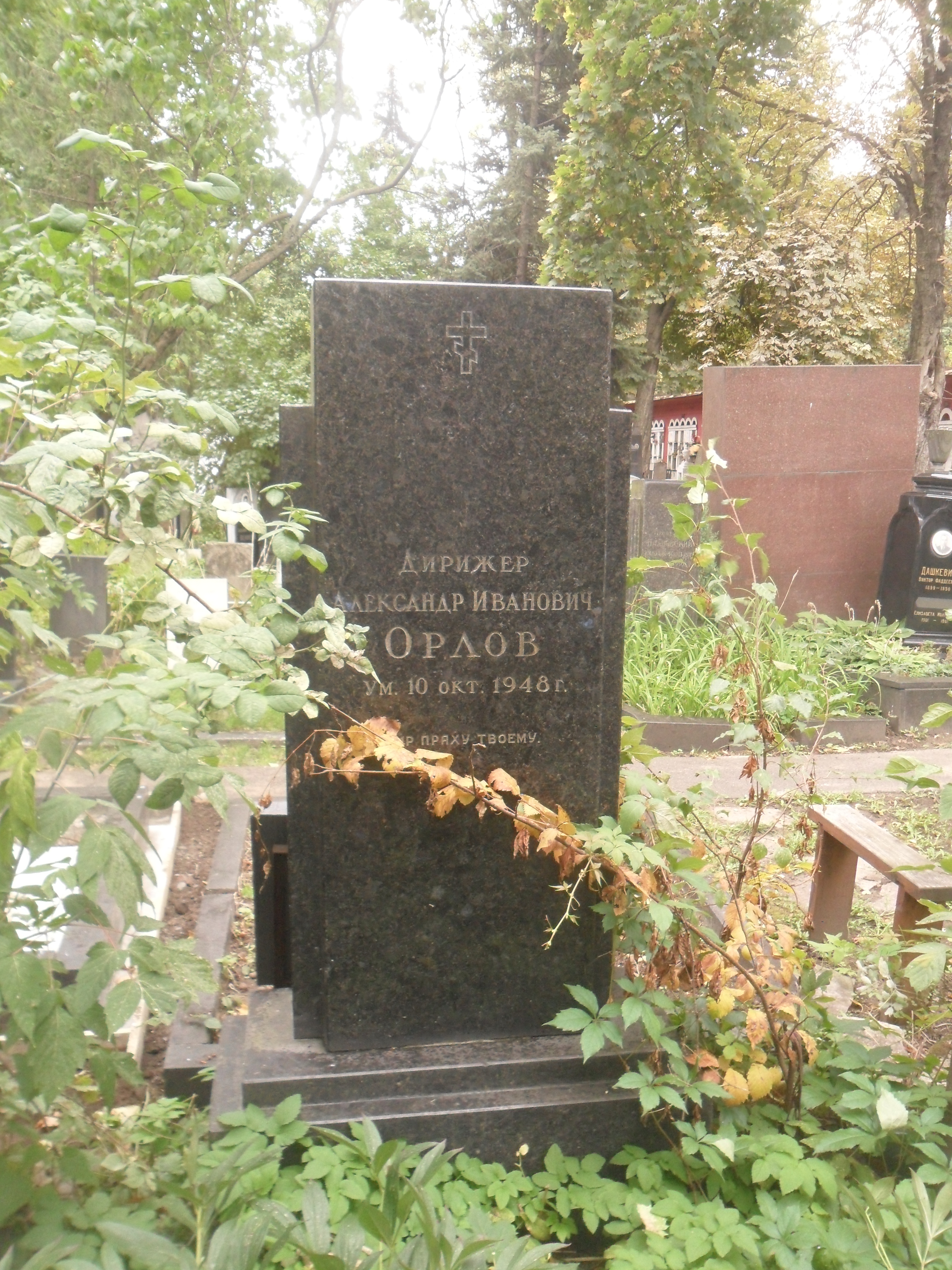

Aleksandr Ivanovich Orlov (Russian: Александр Иванович Орлов) (St. Petersburg 18 August 1873 – Moscow October 10, 1948) was a Russian opera conductor, and People's Artist of the RSFSR (1945). He was the first head of the Bolshoi Symphony Orchestra of All-Union Radio (1930–1937).

== Biography ==
Orlov studied violin at the St. Petersburg Conservatory, under Pyotr Krasnokutsky, and conducting under Paul Juon in Berlin. From 1902, he worked as a symphonic and opera conductor in the cities of southern Russia. From 1912 to 1917, he was conductor of the Symphony Orchestra under Serge Koussevitzky in Moscow, and at the same time implemented a number of opera productions, 1914-1924. From 1925 to 1929, Orlov was Principal Conductor of Kiev State Academic Ukrainian Opera, where he conducted Puccini's Turandot on September of 1928, and a professor of the Kiev Conservatory. His students included Natan Rakhlin. From 1930, Orlov headed the Grand Symphony Orchestra of All-Union Radio, and premiered many works by Soviet composers, and directing opera performances on radio and at the Moscow Conservatory.

He conducted Yehudi Menuhin's first recorded performance of Beethoven's Violin Concerto in 1946.

== Selected Opera Recordings ==
- 1937 - "Eugene Onegin" (Onegin - Panteleimon Nortsov, Lensky - Ivan Kozlovsky, Tatiana - Elena Kruglikova)
- 1946 - "Lakme" sung in Russian (Lakmé - Hope Kazantsev, Gerald - Sergei Lemeshev)
- 1947 - "La Traviata" sung in Russian (Violetta - Elizabeth Shumskaya, Alfredo Germont - Ivan Kozlovsky, Germont - Paul Lisician)
- 1948 - "Eugene Onegin" (Onegin - Andrey Ivanov, Lensky - Ivan Kozlovsky, Tatiana - Elena Kruglikova)
