= Alexander Anisimov =

Russian conductor (born 1947)

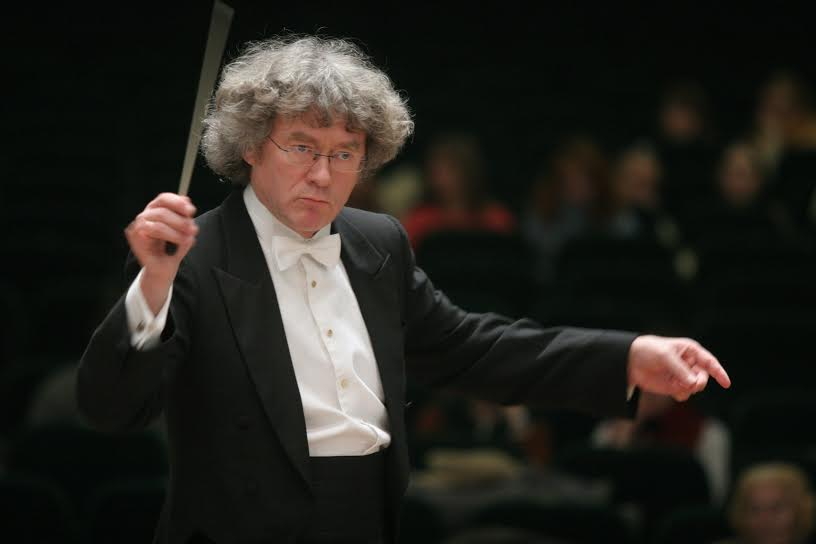
Alexander Anisimov

Alexander Mikhailovich Anisimov (Russian: Алекса́ндр Миха́йлович Ани́симов; born 8 October 1947) is a Russian conductor.

Anisimov was born in Moscow.

In 1995 he was appointed Principal Guest Conductor of the National Symphony Orchestra of Ireland.
