= Erler =

Erler is a German surname. Notable people with the surname include:

- Alexander Erler (born 1997), Austrian tennis player
- David Erler (born 1981), German countertenor
- Dieter Erler (1939–1998), German footballer
- Dietmar Erler (born 1947), German footballer
- Fritz Erler (1868–1940), German painter and graphic designer
- Fritz Erler (politician) (1913–1967), German politician
- Martin Erler, German philatelist
- Michaela Erler (born 1965), German handball player

== Other ==
- Erler, Bismil
- Erler Film, a Turkish movie production company established in 1960
- Karl Erler, the pseudonym of Heinrich Laufenberg
