= Olga Borodina =

Russian opera singer

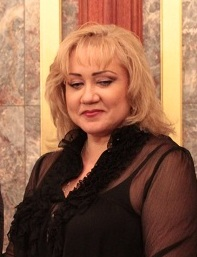
Olga Borodina (2012).

Olga Vladimirovna Borodina (born 29 July 1963, in Leningrad) is a leading mezzo-soprano, known for her roles in Russian operas at her home company, the Mariinsky Theatre, and for her international performing and recording career in a varied repertoire.

In 1992, Borodina made her debut in Samson and Delilah at the Royal Opera House Covent Garden with Plácido Domingo. She performs frequently at the Metropolitan Opera and the San Francisco Opera and many other opera houses in roles including Cinderella in La Cenerentola, Marguérite in La damnation de Faust, Eboli in Don Carlos, Principessa in Adriana Lecouvreur, Carmen in the opera of the same name, Marfa in Khovanshchina, and Amneris in Aida. Borodina is known for her "plush" voice.

She has received recognition as a People's Artist of Russia in 2002, the first prize gold medal of the 1998 Rosa Ponselle Vocal Competition, and also won the Barcelona competition in 1989. She was awarded the State Prize of the Russian Federation (2006).

Borodina is featured in many Russian opera recordings on Philips conducted by Valery Gergiyev with the Mariinsky company. Her Russian heritage is very important to her:

I'm one of the mad people who need their roots. I take nourishment from my native land, my motherland. I want my children to study in Russia, because they are Russian. I think this is tremendously important. But life in St Petersburg is becoming tougher by the day and the Russian spirit, the spirituality that was part and parcel of Russian culture, is almost not there any more.

She pulled out of a production of Carmen at La Scala because the recitatives were spoken instead of sung, and left rehearsals at the Royal Opera House for Aida, directed by Robert Wilson, because she found the conductor's (Antonio Pappano) "approach too alien to the opera". Subsequently, critics vindicated Borodina and 2011 she returned to Covent Garden to perform in Aida, also conducted by Pappano. In 2006, the management of the Vienna State Opera "decided to distance itself from an engagement [with Borodina], not just for this production but also for all others" on the night of the première of L'italiana in Algeri. Borodina was scheduled to sing at the Vienna State Opera in Aida in March 2013.

In 2014, Borodina performed the role of Amneris in Aida at the Met in New York, much to critical acclaim. Her signature role, over the years, has been that of Dalila in Camille Saint-Saëns’ Samson et Dalila. Notable performances include the acclaimed production at the Metropolitan Opera featuring Placido Domingo in 1998, a recording with Jose Cura and Sir Colin Davis, and, most recently, a highly-praised performance with Dallas Opera opposite of Clifton Forbis in 2017.

== Selected recordings ==
Berlioz, Roméo et Juliette, Olga Borodina, Evgeny Nikitin, Kenneth Tarver, Guildhall School Singers, London Symphony Chorus, LSO, conducted by Valery Gergiev SACD Live LSO 2016
