= Tchaikovsky Symphony Orchestra =

Russian classical music radio orchestra

- Radio orchestra
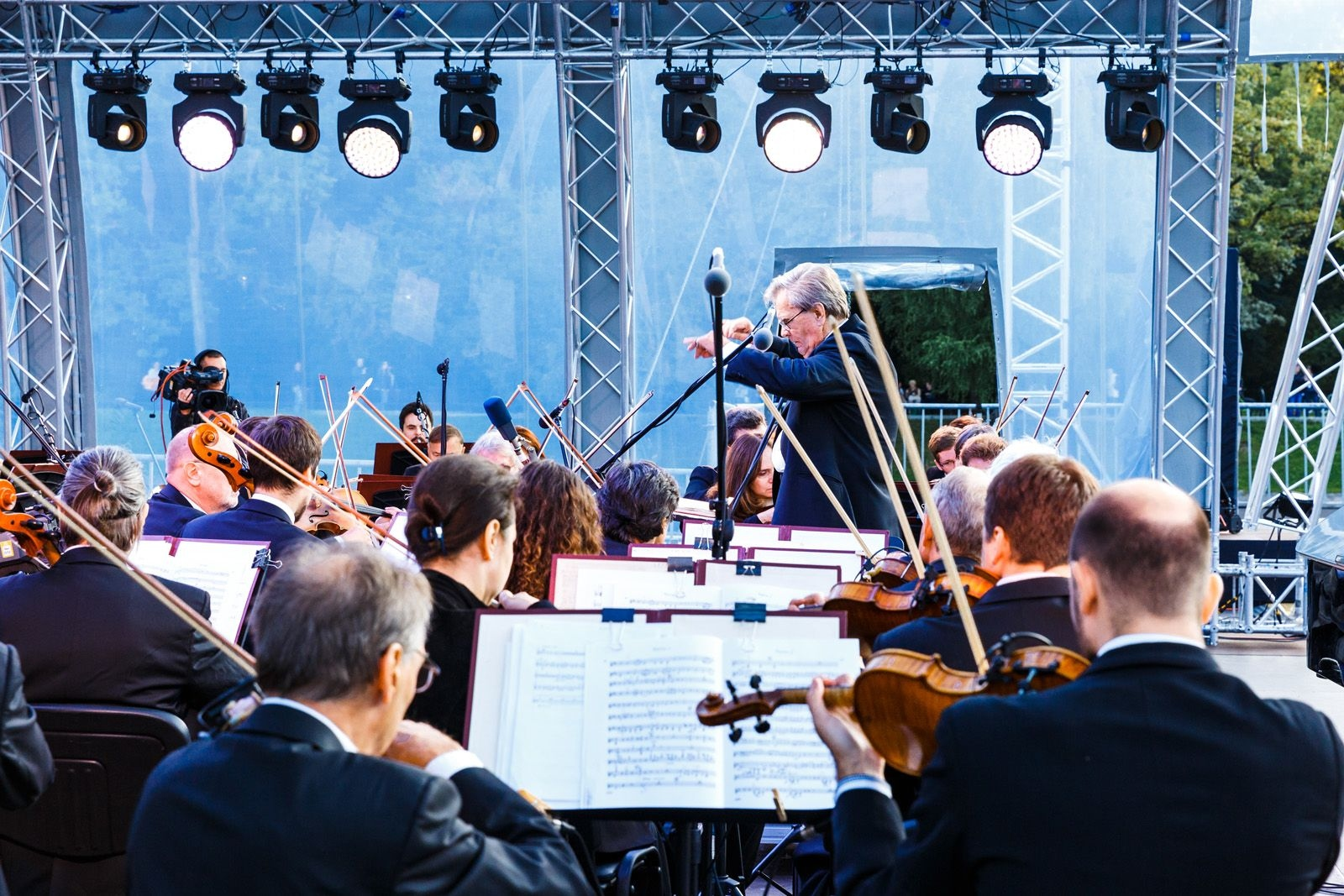
- Native name: Большой симфонический оркестр имени П. И. Чайковского
- Former name: Moscow Radio Symphony Orchestra (1930–1993); USSR State Radio and Television Symphony Orchestra; USSR State Radio Symphony Orchestra; USSR All-Union National Radio and Central Television Symphony Orchestra
- Founded: 1930; 96 years ago
- Location: Moscow, Russia
- Principal conductor: Vladimir Fedoseyev
- Website: Official website (English)

The Tchaikovsky Symphony Orchestra (Russian: Симфонический оркестр имени Чайковского) is a Russian classical music radio orchestra established in 1930. It was founded as the Moscow Radio Symphony Orchestra, and served as the official symphony for the Soviet All-Union Radio network.

== History ==
Following the dissolution of the Soviet Union in 1991, the orchestra was renamed in 1993 by the Russian Ministry of Culture in recognition of the central role the music of Tchaikovsky plays in its repertoire. The current music director is Vladimir Fedoseyev, who has been in that position since 1974.

During Soviet times, the orchestra was sometimes known as the USSR State Radio and Television Symphony Orchestra, the USSR State Radio Symphony Orchestra, or the USSR All-Union National Radio and Central Television Symphony Orchestra.

== Music Directors ==
- Alexander Orlov (1930–1937)
- Nikolai Golovanov (1937–1953)
- Alexander Gauk (1953–1961)
- Gennady Rozhdestvensky (1961–1974)
- Vladimir Fedoseyev (since 1974)

== Selected discography ==
=== Moscow Radio Symphony Orchestra ===
- Fine: Symphonic Music of Irving Fine Delos DE 3139
- Mahler: Symphony No. 9 in D major BIS BIS-CD-632 Orchestral
- Sibelius: Symphony No. 1 in E Minor, Op. 39 Westminster Gold WG-8361
- Tchaikovsky Cycle (The) (6 DVD Box Set) (NTSC) Arthaus Musik 102119 Classical Concert

- Tchaikovsky: Symphony No. 1 / Rococo Variations (Tchaikovsky Cycle, Vol. 1) (NTSC) Arthaus Musik 102121 Classical Concert
- Tchaikovsky: Symphony No. 2 / Eugene Onegin (excerpts) (Tchaikovsky Cycle, Vol. 2) (NTSC) Arthaus Musik 102123 Classical Concert
- Tchaikovsky: Symphony No. 3 / Swan Lake (excerpts) (Tchaikovsky Cycle, Vol. 3) (NTSC) Arthaus Musik 102125 Classical Concert
- Tchaikovsky: Symphony No. 4 / Violin Concerto (Tchaikovsky Cycle, Vol. 4) (NTSC) Arthaus Musik 102127 Classical Concert
- Tchaikovsky: Symphony No. 5 / Piano Concerto No. 2 (Tchaikovsky Cycle, Vol. 5) (NTSC) Arthaus Musik 102129 Classical Concert
- Tchaikovsky: Symphony No. 6 / Piano Concerto No. 1 (Tchaikovsky Cycle, Vol. 6) (NTSC) Arthaus Musik 102131 Classical Concert

=== Moscow Radio Tchaikovsky Symphony Orchestra ===
- Classical Meditation Naxos 8.570364-65 Concertos, Orchestral, Chamber Music, Choral - Sacred, Choral - Secular
- Pavlova: Symphonies Nos. 2 and 4 Naxos 8.557566 Orchestral
- Pavlova: Symphony No. 5 / Elegy Naxos 8.570369 Orchestral

== See also ==
- Boris Gusman
