= Mark Ermler =

Soviet and Russian conductor (1932–2002)

- Марк Эрмлер
- Born: May 5, 1932; Leningrad
- Died: April 14, 2002 (aged 69); Seoul
- Occupation: Conductor
- Parents: Fridrikh Ermler (father); Vera Bakun (mother)

Mark Fridrikhovich Ermler (Russian: Марк Фридрихович Эрмлер; 5 May 1932 – 14 April 2002) was a Soviet and Russian conductor. Leading conductor of the Bolshoi Theatre in the 1980s and 1990s.

== Biography ==
Mark Ermler was born in Leningrad in 1932. His parents were Vera Bakun, a film set designer, and Fridrikh Ermler, a film director. He began to study piano at age 5.

His first conducting appearance at the Bolshoi Theatre was in a 1957 production of Cavalleria rusticana. His other noted operatic engagements included conducting the first performances of Sergei Prokofiev's last opera, The Story of a Real Man.

Ermler was especially noted for his conducting of ballets. He conducted, among others, Swan Lake, Petrushka, The Firebird, The Sleeping Beauty, and The Nutcracker. He made complete recordings of all three of Tchaikovsky's ballets and Prokofiev's Romeo and Juliet with the orchestra of the Royal Opera House, Covent Garden. He became principal guest conductor of the Royal Ballet, London, in 1985.

Ermler died at April 4, 2002 during the tour with the Seoul Philharmonic Orchestra in Seoul. He was buried in Moscow, in the closed part of the columbarium of the Vagankovo Cemetery (section 53A).

== Personal life ==
Wife - Dina Georgievna Ermler (1927-2021), singer and dancer, worked in the theater in Yekaterinburg. Later - left her career, devoting herself to her family. Daughter - Maria Ermler (1959-2009).

== Selected recordings ==
- Prokofiev – The Story of a Real Man. Bolshoi, 1961. reissued Chandos.
- Prokofiev – Symphony No. 5. Academic Symphony Orchestra of the Soviet Union. Melodiya. 33C10-09945-6. (LP)

== See also ==
- Ermler

Cultural offices
Preceded by Vassily Sinaisky	Music Director, Moscow Philharmonic Orchestra; 1996–1998	Succeeded by Yuri Simonov
Preceded by Alexander Lazarev	Music Director, Bolshoi Theatre, Moscow; 1998–2000	Succeeded by Alexander Vedernikov
Preceded by Gyeong-Su Won	Principal Conductor, Seoul Philharmonic Orchestra; 2000–2002	Succeeded by Seung Gwak
