= The Cathedral (Honchar novel) =

1968 novel by Oles Honchar

The Cathedral: A Novel
- Author: Oles Honchar
- Original title: Собор
- Translators: Yuri Tkach and Leonid Rudnytzky
- Language: Ukrainian
- Genre: Novel
- Publisher: Vitchyzna (in Ukrainian); St. Sophia Religious Association of Ukrainian Catholics (in English)
- Publication date: 1968 (in Ukrainian)
- Publication place: UkrSSR; USA
- English publication date: 1989
- Media type: Paperback
- Pages: 308
- Preceded by: Tronka (1963)
- Followed by: Cyclone (1970)

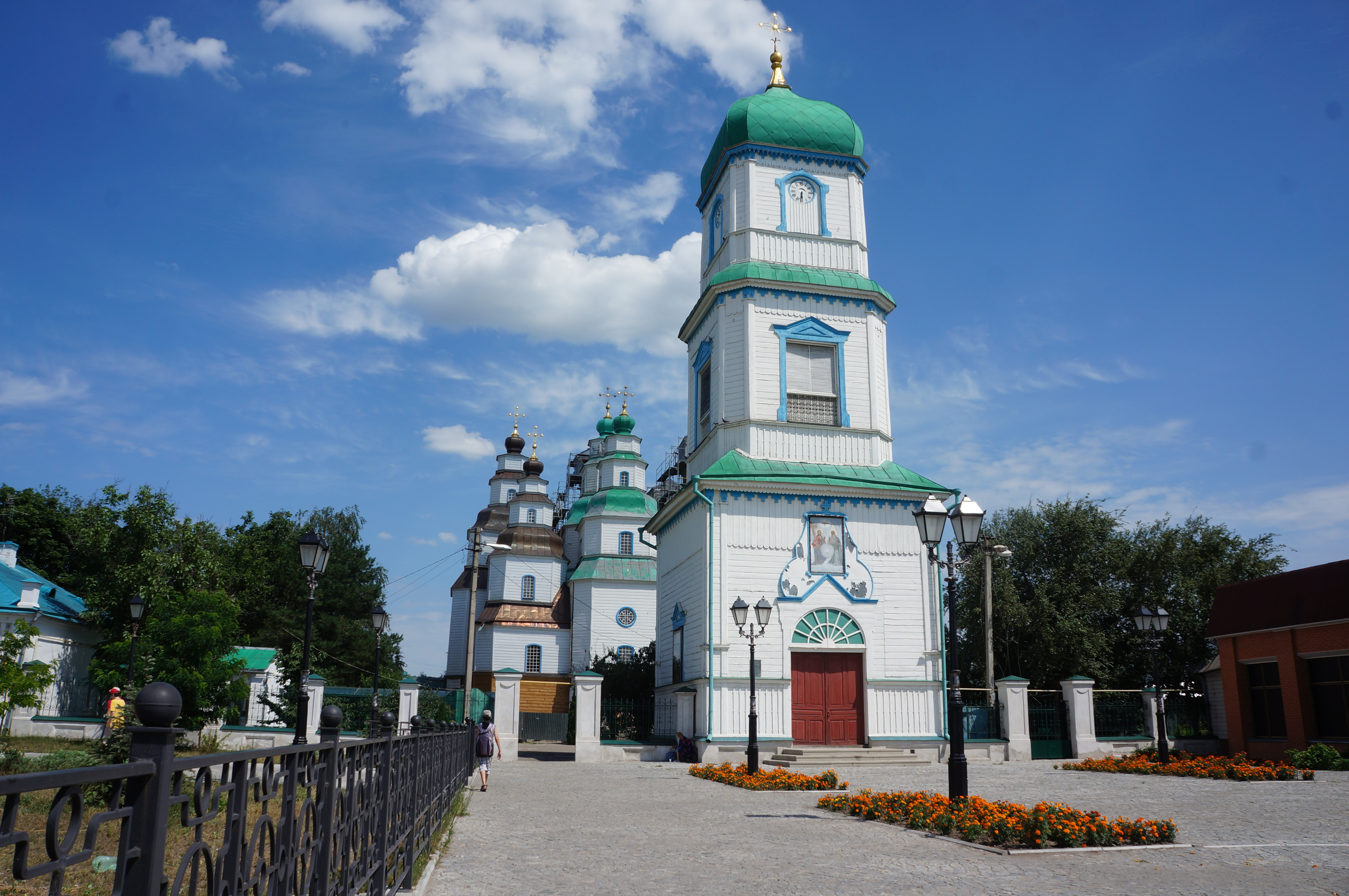
Wooden Holy Trinity Cathedral in Samar, Ukraine built in 1778

The Cathedral (Ukrainian: «Собор», romanized: Sobor) is a 1968 novel by Oles Honchar. It was Honchar's best known novel but also saw him come under censure by the Brezhnev regime. The book was initially well received and massively popular among students. After sudden criticism of the novel, a group of literature students organized a defense of the novel, leading to surveillance and reprisals from the KGB. A planned translation to Russian was halted and the Ukrainian edition withdrawn. The titular cathedral was based on the story of the Holy Trinity Cathedral in Samar, Ukraine (then called Novomoskovsk). The Russian translation was published in Roman-Gazeta issue 7, 1987. English translation – The Cathedral: A Novel. Trans. by Yuri Tkach and Leonid Rudnytzky. St. Sophia Religious Association of Ukrainian Catholics, 1989.

== See also ==
- List of Ukrainian-language poets
- List of Ukrainian-language writers
- Ukrainian literature
