= Yevgeny Kibkalo =

Russian opera singer

Kibkalo in 1961

Yevgeny Gavrilovich Kibkalo (Russian: Евгений Гаврилович Кибкало; 12 February 1932 – 12 February 2003) was a Soviet and Russian operatic baritone singer and pedagogue. People's Artist of the RSFSR (1970).

Kiblako notably sang Petruchio for Zdeněk Chalabala's recording of Shebalin's The Taming of the Shrew in 1957, and the title role, of legless pilot Aleksey Maresyev, in the first (and only) recording of Prokofiev's The Story of a Real Man conducted by Mark Ermler in 1961.
