= Glafira Deomidova =

Russian soprano (1929–2017)

Glafira Vladimirovna Deomidova (Russian: Глафира Владимировна Деомидова, 15 October 1929 – 12 May 2017) was a Russian soprano who sang at the Bolshoi Theatre company from 1956 to 1977.

Deomidova sang the role of Bianca in Zdeněk Chalabala's premiere (and only) recording of Shebalin's Taming of the Shrew in 1957 and the female lead role of Olga in the first (and likewise only) recording of Prokofiev's The Story of a Real Man conducted by Mark Ermler in 1961. She died on 12 May 2017, at the age of 87.
