= Agniya Kuznetsova (writer) =

Soviet writer (1911–1996)

- Born: 11 February 1911; Irkutsk Governorate, Russian Empire
- Died: 12 November 1996 (aged 85); Moscow, Russia
- Education: Saint Petersburg State University
- Occupation: writer
- Spouse: Georgi Markov
- Writing career
- Period: 1943–1984
- Notable awards: Medal "For Valiant Labour in the Great Patriotic War 1941–1945" Order of the Red Banner of Labour Order of Friendship of Peoples Order of the Badge of Honour

Agniya Aleksandrovna Kuznetsova (Russian: А́гния Алекса́ндровна Кузнецо́ва, Russian pronunciation: [ˈaɡnʲɪjə ɐlʲɪkˈsandrəvnə kʊzʲnʲɪˈt͡sovə]) (11 February 1911 – 12 November 1996) was a Russian Soviet children's writer.

== Life ==
She graduated from high school and the Faculty of History and Philology of the Saint Petersburg State University. She worked as a literary employee for children's and youth newspapers in Saint Petersburg and Novosibirsk, and at the Irkutsk Radio Committee. In 1943 to 1946 she was executive secretary of the Irkutsk branch of the RSFSR SP. The first book of her stories was published in 1932 in Novosibirsk.

She was published in the anthology “New Siberia”, the magazines Roman-Gazeta, “Youth” and other periodicals. Throughout her creative career, she wrote about children and youth. Author of essays, stories and stories.

She worked on the Pushkin theme; the book “My Madonna” brings together stories about Natalya Goncharova and Pushkin's children. The works were translated into foreign languages. Composer Tamara Popatenko set some of Kuznetsova’s writings to music. She was buried beside her husband Georgi Markov at the Troyekurovskoye cemetery.

== Awards ==
- Medal "For Valiant Labour in the Great Patriotic War 1941–1945" (1979)
- Order of the Red Banner of Labour
- Order of Friendship of Peoples (1984)
- Order of the Badge of Honor

== Selected bibliography ==
- В Чулымской тайге. Иркутск, 1939
- Чёртова дюжина. Иркутск, 1946
- Твой дом. Новосибирск, 1951
- Жизнь зовёт. Красноярск, 1958
- Честное комсомольское, 1959
- Свет-трава, 1967
- Мы из Коршуна. 1970
- Ночевала тучка золотая, 1971
- Много на земле дорог. 1972
- Земной поклон.1977
- Земной поклон: Повести: Советский писатель, 1979
- Под бурями судьбы жестокой. Пермь, 1979
- Достоинство: Повести. Молодая гвардия, 1980
- Собрание сочинений: В 3-х томах. : Детская литература, 1982–1984.

== Literature ==
- Писатели Москвы: Биобиблиографический справочник / Сост.: Е. П. Ионов, С. П. Колов. Московский рабочий, 1987
- Абрамович А. Ф. А. А. Кузнецова: Биогр. очерк // Литературная Сибирь. Иркутск: Вост.-Сиб. кн. изд-во, 1971.
- Писатели Восточной Сибири: Биобиблиографический указатель. Иркутск: Вост.-Сиб. кн. изд-во, 1973.
- Разумневич В. А. Проводы в совершеннолетие: Очерк творчества А. Кузнецовой.1974.
- Розова И. А. Кузнецова Агния // Русские детские писатели XX века: Биобиблиографический словарь. Флинта; Наука, 1997. С. 247–248. — ISBN 5-02-011304-2.
