= Oleksandr Chetverikov =

Ukrainian soldier

Oleksandr Dmytrovych Chetverikov (Ukrainian: Олександр Дмитрович Четверіков; July 30, 1992, city of Novomoskovsk, now Samar – May 15, 2023, Bakhmut direction, Donetsk Oblast) — a Ukrainian soldier, junior lieutenant of the Armed Forces of Ukraine, a participant in the Russo-Ukrainian War. Recipient of the Order of "For Courage" III class (2022).

== Biography ==
Oleksandr Chetverikov was born on July 30, 1992, in the city of Novomoskovsk (now Samar, Dnipropetrovsk Oblast).

He has been on the frontlines since 2014, participating in the ATO (Anti-Terrorist Operation in Eastern Ukraine).

After the start of the large-scale Russian invasion, he returned to the front. He served as a tank platoon commander of a fire support company. He died on May 15, 2023, in the Bakhmut direction in Donetsk region.

He was buried in his hometown.

He is survived by his parents and brother. His brother Ruslan Chetverikov was a participant in the defense of Azovstal and was in Russian captivity.

== Awards ==
- Order of "For Courage" III class (August 12, 2022) — for personal courage and selfless actions shown in the defense of the state sovereignty and territorial integrity of Ukraine, and loyalty to the military oath;
- President of Ukraine's award "For Participation in the Anti-Terrorist Operation".

== Military Ranks ==
- junior lieutenant;
- sergeant.

== Sources ==
- "One son died, the other is in Russian captivity: Novomoskovsk bid farewell to the fallen Hero". Dnipro Region. May 22, 2023.
- Iryna Rudenko (May 21, 2023). "It became known about the death of two warriors from Dnipropetrovsk region". Suspilne Dnipro.
- Mariya Kozkina (May 23, 2023). "The whole city buried Commander Chetverikov. A soldier from Dnipropetrovsk region died". Dniprovskaya poradnytsia.
