= Georgi Markov (disambiguation) =

Georgi Markov (1929–1978) was a Bulgarian dissident.

Georgi Markov may also refer to:

- Georgi Markov (Soviet writer) (1911–1991), Soviet writer and public figure
- Georgi Markov (historian) (born 1946), Bulgarian historian
- Georgi Markov (politician) (born 1950), Bulgarian politician and lawyer
- Georgi Markov (footballer) (1972–2018), Bulgarian football player
- Georgi Markov (weightlifter) (born 1978), Bulgarian weightlifter
- Georgi Markov (wrestler), (born 1946), Bulgarian wrestler
