= Zdeněk Chalabala =

Czech conductor

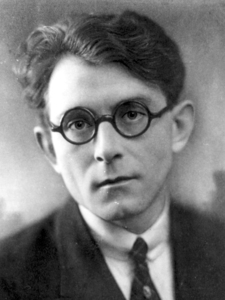
Chalabala in 1930

Zdeněk Chalabala (18 April 1899 – 4 March 1962) was a Czech conductor. He conducted orchestras in Prague, Ostrava, Moscow.

== Life and career ==
Chalabala was born in Uherské Hradiště. He studied conducting at the Brno Conservatory with František Neumann, and after a few years gaining experience was appointed a conductor of the Brno Opera in 1926 alongside Břetislav Bakala; in 1932 conducted the premiere there of Flammen by Erwin Schulhoff. He also conducted performances of operas by Borodin, Mussorgsky and Rimsky-Korsakov.

In 1924 he founded the Slovácká filharmonie (Uherské Hradiště). He was chief opera conductor of the Slovak National Theatre, where he produced many Yugoslav and Russian operas. He was also conductor in the National Theatre Brno. His students included Vítězslava Kaprálová.

Chalabala was dismissed from the post at the end of the war and worked in Ostrava, Brno and Bratislava before returning to the Prague National Theatre as principal conductor in 1953, a position he held until his death. He took the company to Moscow in 1956 which led to an engagement at the Bolshoi, where he conducted Leoš Janáček's Jenůfa and gave the Moscow premiere of The Taming of the Shrew by Vissarion Shebalin. He died in Prague.

He is buried at the Vyšehrad Cemetery in Prague.

== Selected recordings ==
- 1953 – Suchon's Krútňava with Slovak National Theatre company (Supraphon)
- 1953 – Fibich's Šárka
- 1956 – excerpts from Foerster's Eva
- 1957 – Shebalin's comic opera The Taming of the Shrew - premiere, recording with Galina Vishnevskaya (soprano), Yevgeny Kibkalo (baritone), Glafira Deomidova (soprano).
- 1958 – Smetana's The Kiss
- 1961 – Dvořák: The Golden Spinning Wheel; The Wood Dove; The Midday Witch; The Water Goblin. Czech Philharmonic, Zdeněk Chalabala, Urania 5172 (Koch).
