= Yevgania Yosifovna Yakhina =

Soviet composer Yevgania Yosifovna Yakhina (1918 – 1983) was born in Kharkiv (today part of Ukraine). She studied composition under Vissarion Shebalin at the Moscow Conservatory, graduating in 1945. She taught at the Moscow School of Music from 1944 to 1948, then taught evening classes at an unspecified school beginning in 1953. Yakhina set poems by Alexander Blok, Vadim Shefner, and other Soviet poets, to music.

Her compositions include:

== Chamber ==
- Concerto for Oboe and Piano (1953)
- Prelude (piano; 1954)
- Sonata (violin and piano)
- String Quartet (1946)
- Suite (clarinet and piano; 1952)
- Watercolors (harp; 1976)

== Orchestra ==
- Children's Scenes (1975)
- Dramatic Poem (1955)

== Vocal ==
- Poem (cantata; text by Nikolai Tikhonov; 1945)
- Poems of the Heart (voice and piano; 1976)
- Three Choruses (text by Alexander Pushkin and Mikhail Lermontov; a capella choir; 1947)
