= Samar, Ukraine =

City in Dnipropetrovsk Oblast, Ukraine

Samar Самар
- City
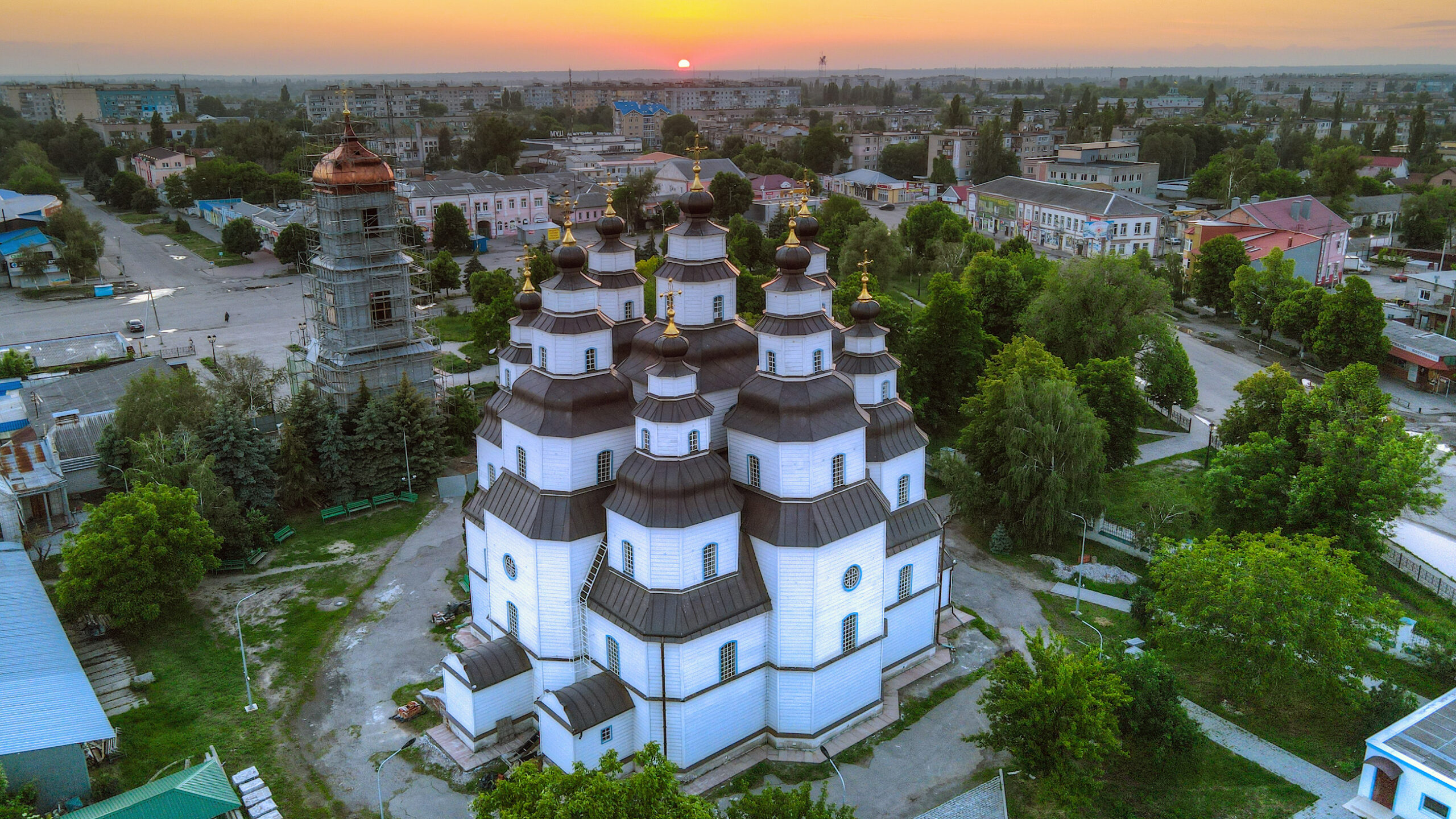
- Holy Trinity Cathedral

- Flag Coat of arms
- Interactive map of Samar
- Location of Samar Samar (Ukraine)
- Coordinates: 48°38′N 35°13′E
- Country: Ukraine
- Oblast: Dnipropetrovsk Oblast
- Raion: Samar Raion
- Hromada: Samar urban hromada
- Founded: 1672
- City status: 1784

Area
  - Total: 36 km^{2} (14 sq mi)
- Elevation: 62 m (203 ft)

Population (2022)
  - Total: 69,855
  - Estimate (2024): 66,973
  - Density: 1,900/km^{2} (5,000/sq mi)
- Postal code: 51200-51214
- Area code: +380-5693

Samar (Ukrainian: Самар [sɐˈmɑr]), formerly known as Novomoskovsk (Ukrainian: Новомосковськ, IPA: [nowomoˈskɔu̯sʲk]) until 2024, is a city and municipality in Dnipropetrovsk Oblast, Ukraine. It serves as the administrative centre of Samar Raion within the oblast. Samar is located predominantly on the right bank of the Samara River, a left tributary of the Dnieper River. The city is located 27 kilometres (17 mi) from the administrative center of the oblast, Dnipro. As of January 2022, Samar's population was approximately 69,855.

== History ==
A city with the name Samar (now known as Old Samar) has existed from the end of the 17th century. The Cossacks abandoned the town in 1688 when Russia built the Bohorodytska Fortress in the city. Soon after, the former inhabitants of the Old Samar founded another settlement named Samar upstream the Samara River. In 18th-century documents, the city is also named Samarchyk, Novoselytsia or Palanka. The town was the administrative center of the Samara Palanka (province) of the Zaporozhian Cossacks.

In 1777, a town named Yekaterinoslav, meaning "the glory of Catherine" (after Russian empress Catherine II), was built on the location. The site was badly chosen – spring waters transformed the city into a bog. The surviving settlement was in 1794 renamed to Novomoskovsk. The city name Yekaterinoslav was given to current Dnipro.

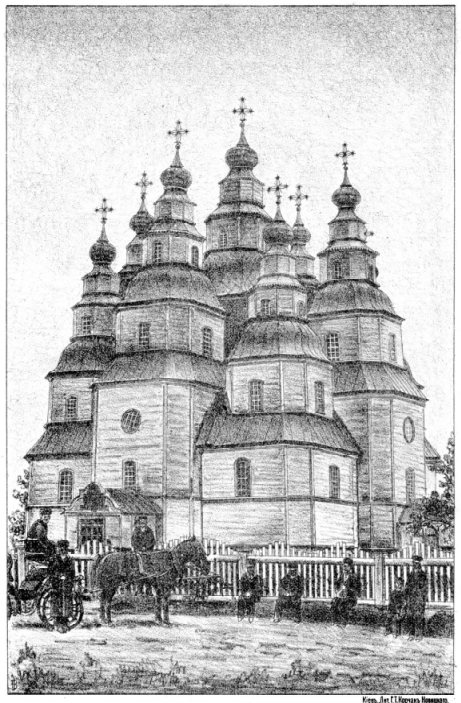
Holy Trinity Cathedral in the 1880s

The city is famous for the Holy Trinity Cathedral, built in 1778 by Yakym Pohrybniak from wood without any nails. A novel dedicated to the cathedral by Ukrainian writer Oles Honchar became a classic of 20th-century Ukrainian literature.

In 1917 the Ukrainian People's Republic tried to rename Novomoskovsk to Samar. During the Ukrainian War of Independence, from 1917 to 1920, it passed between various factions. Afterwards it was administratively part of the Katerynoslav Governorate of Ukraine.

Until 18 July 2020, Novomoskovsk was incorporated as a city of oblast significance and served as the administrative center of Novomoskovsk Raion though it did not belong to the raion. In July 2020, as part of the administrative reform of Ukraine, which reduced the number of raions of Dnipropetrovsk Oblast to seven, the city of Novomoskovsk was merged into Novomoskovsk Raion.

Following the Russian invasion of Ukraine in 2022, the city council voted in January 2024 to rename Novomoskovsk to Nova Samar (Нова Самарь). On 19 September 2024, the Supreme Council of Ukraine voted to rename Novomoskovsk to Samar.

== Demographics ==
In 2001, Samar (at the time Novomoskovsk) had a population of 71,860 people. In terms of ethnicity, Ukrainians constitute a large majority, accounting for over 80% of the population. The second-largest group are people with an ethnic Russian background (13%), while the remaining population consists of Belarusians, Germans, Armenians, people of Turkic origin, Jews and Romani people. The exact ethnic composition was as follows:

Ethnic groups in Samar
	percent
Ukrainians	84.45%
Russians	13.34%
Belarusians	0.48%
Armenians	0.30%
Romani	0.28%
Moldovans	0.11%
Azerbaijanis	0.11%
Jews	0.10%
Tatars	0.10%
Germans	0.07%

== Notable people ==
- Mykola Hlushchenko (1901–1977), Ukrainian painter and Soviet spy
- Stepan Koval (born 1965), film director and animator
- Viktor Skrypnyk (born 1969), football manager

== Gallery ==
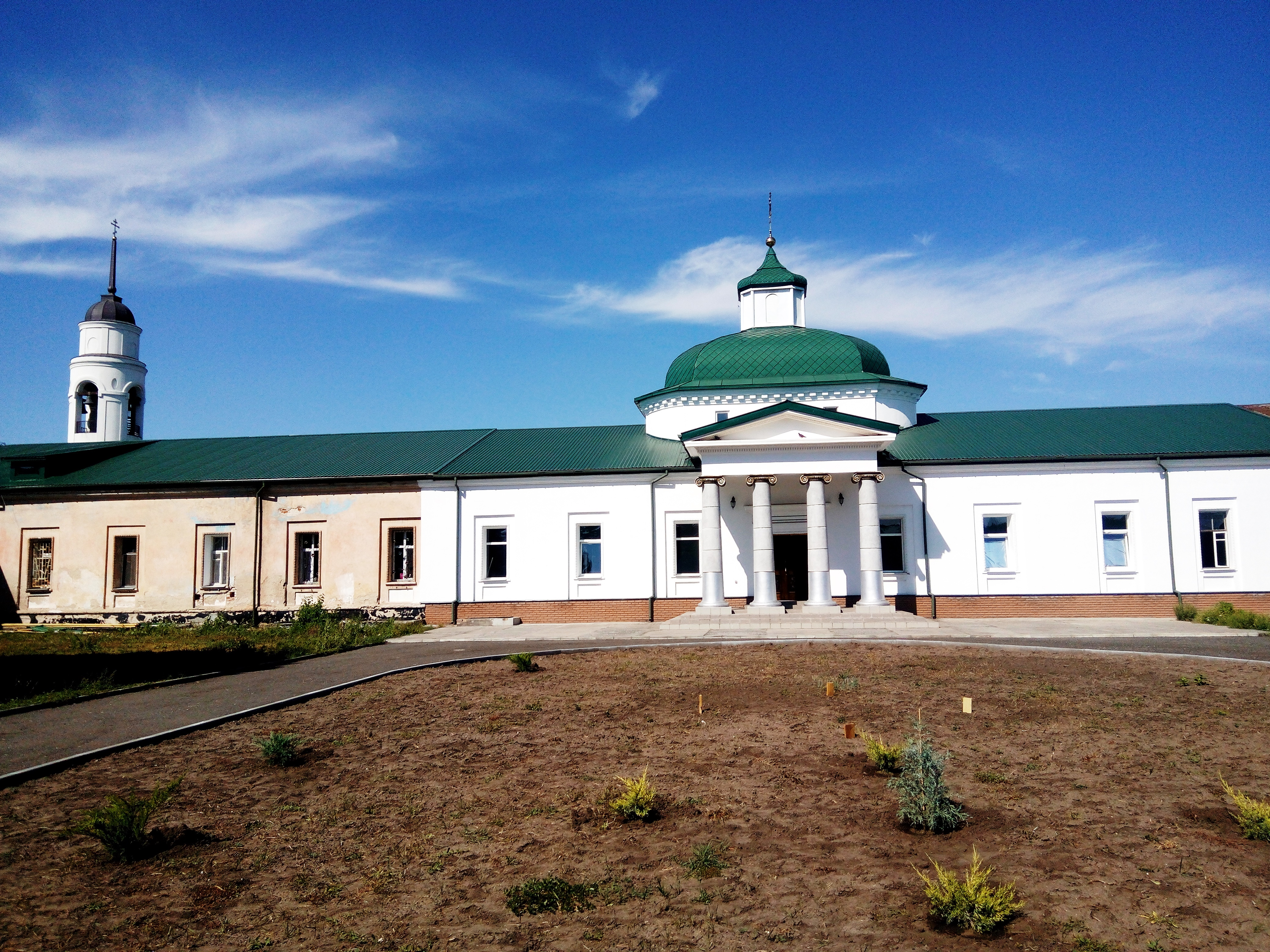
Samar monastery

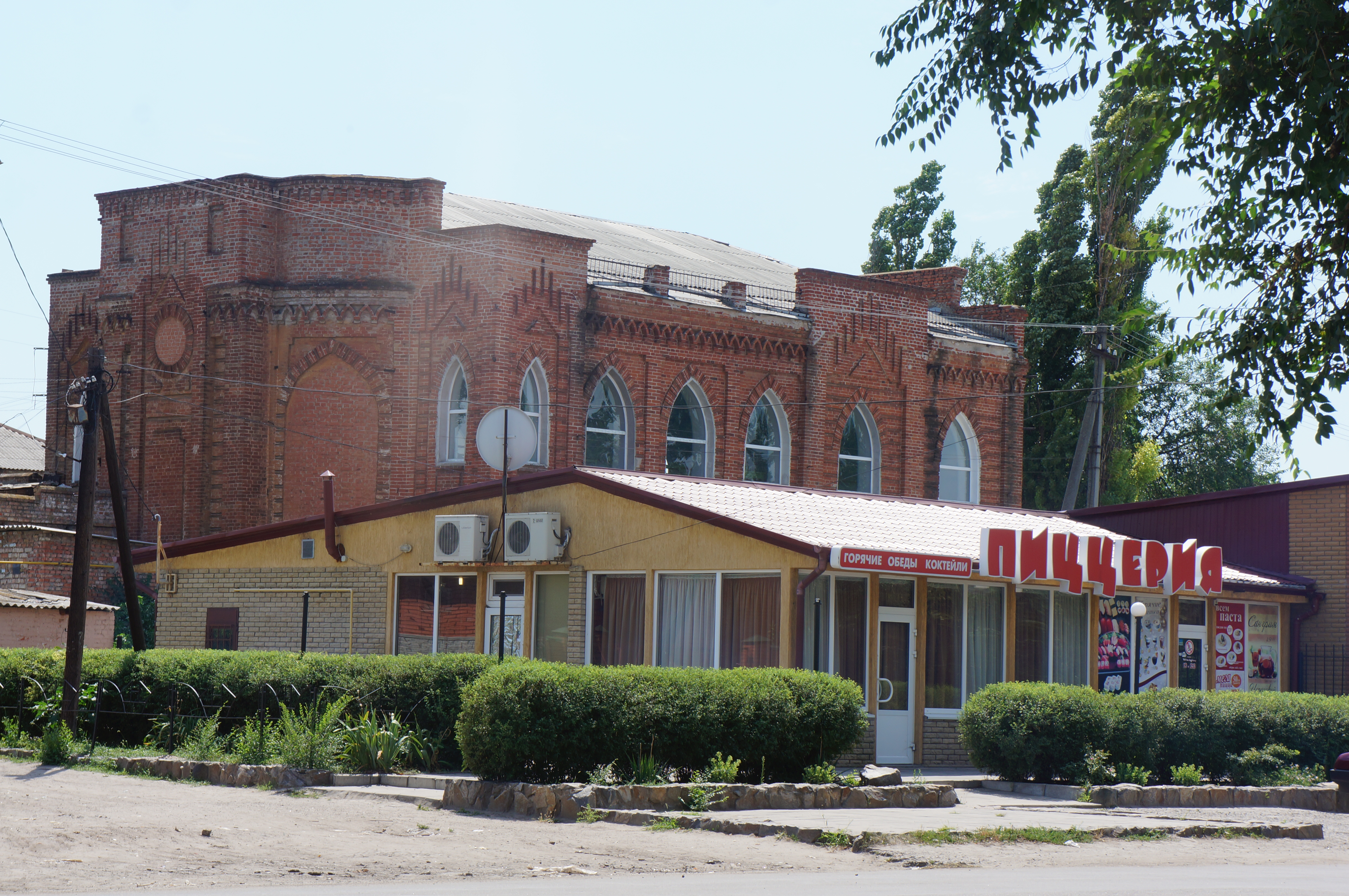
Former synagogue building in Samar

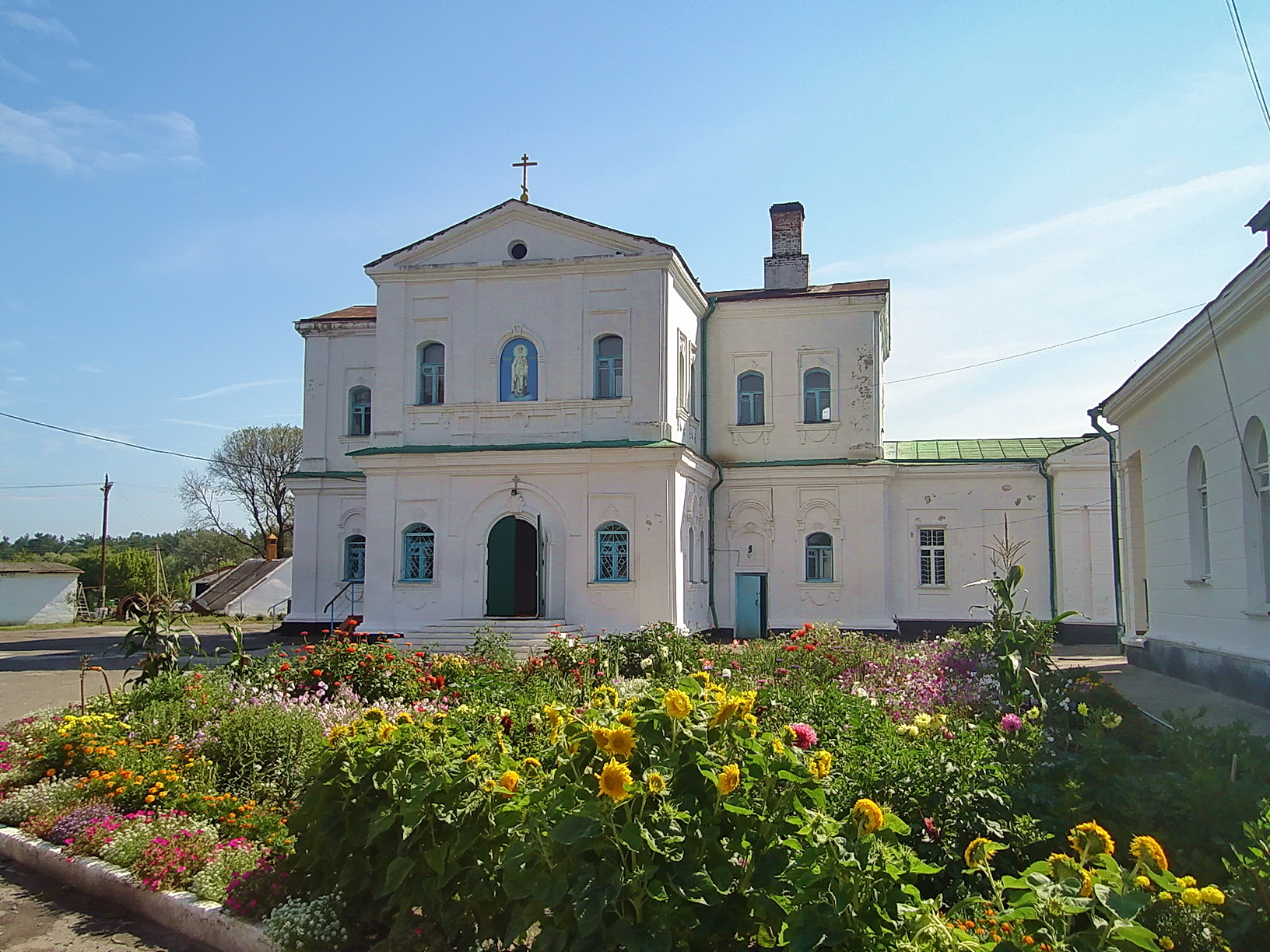
St. Nicholas Cathedral

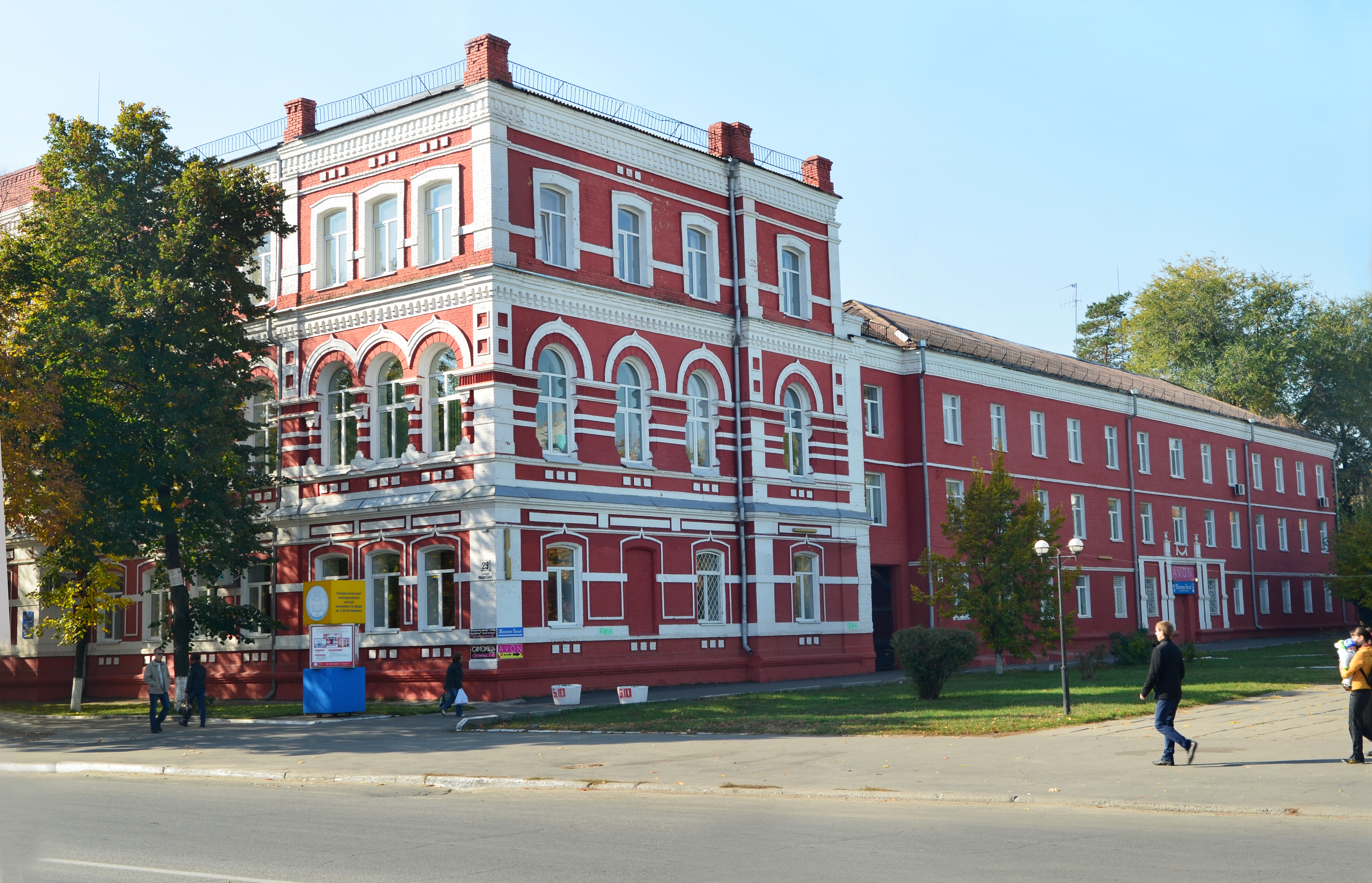
Technical Institute

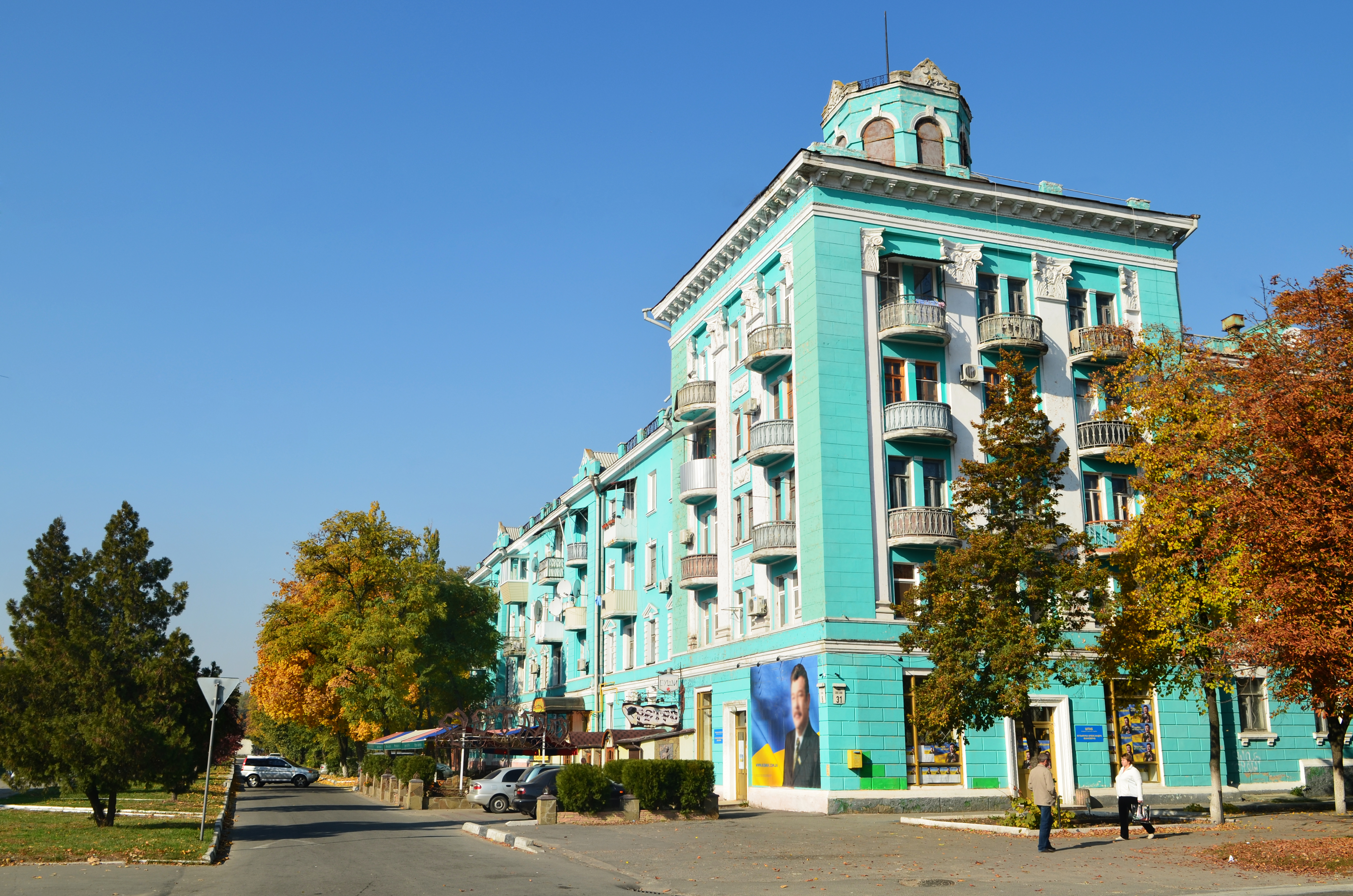
Stalinist architecture

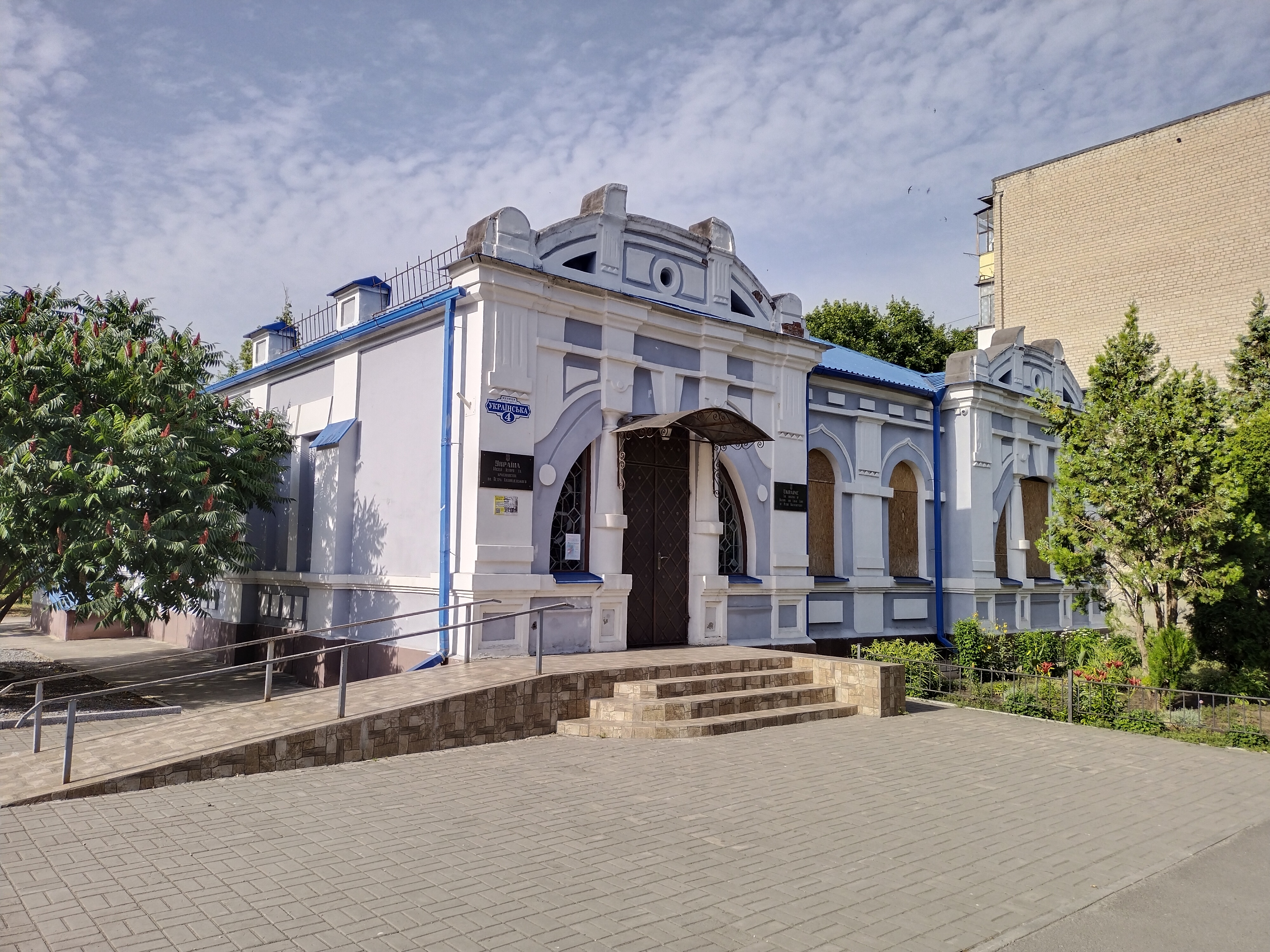
Local museum

== See also ==
- Samar, Dnipro
