= The Story of a Real Man =

Opera by Sergei Prokofiev

- Opera by Sergei Prokofiev
- Native title: Russian: Повесть о настоящем человеке (Povest' o nastoyashchem cheloveke)
- Librettist: Sergei Prokofiev; Mira Mendelson
- Language: Russian

The Story of a Real Man (Russian: Повесть о настоящем человеке, romanized: Povest' o nastoyashchem cheloveke) is an opera in four acts by the Russian composer Sergei Prokofiev, his opus 117. It is based on the novel of the same name by Boris Polevoy recounting the life of Aleksey Maresyev. It was written from 1947 to 1948.

== Recordings ==
- Yevgeny Kibkalo (as Aleksey), Glafira Deomidova (as Olga). Chorus and orchestra of the Bolshoi Theatre, dir. Mark Ermler. Studio recording, 1961, Moscow, based on 1960 Bolshoi Theatre production; CHANDOS CHAN 10002 (2CD, with libretto in Cyrillic, and translations). The recording is abridged.
