= Trinity Cathedral, Samar =

Trinity Cathedral
- Троїцький собор
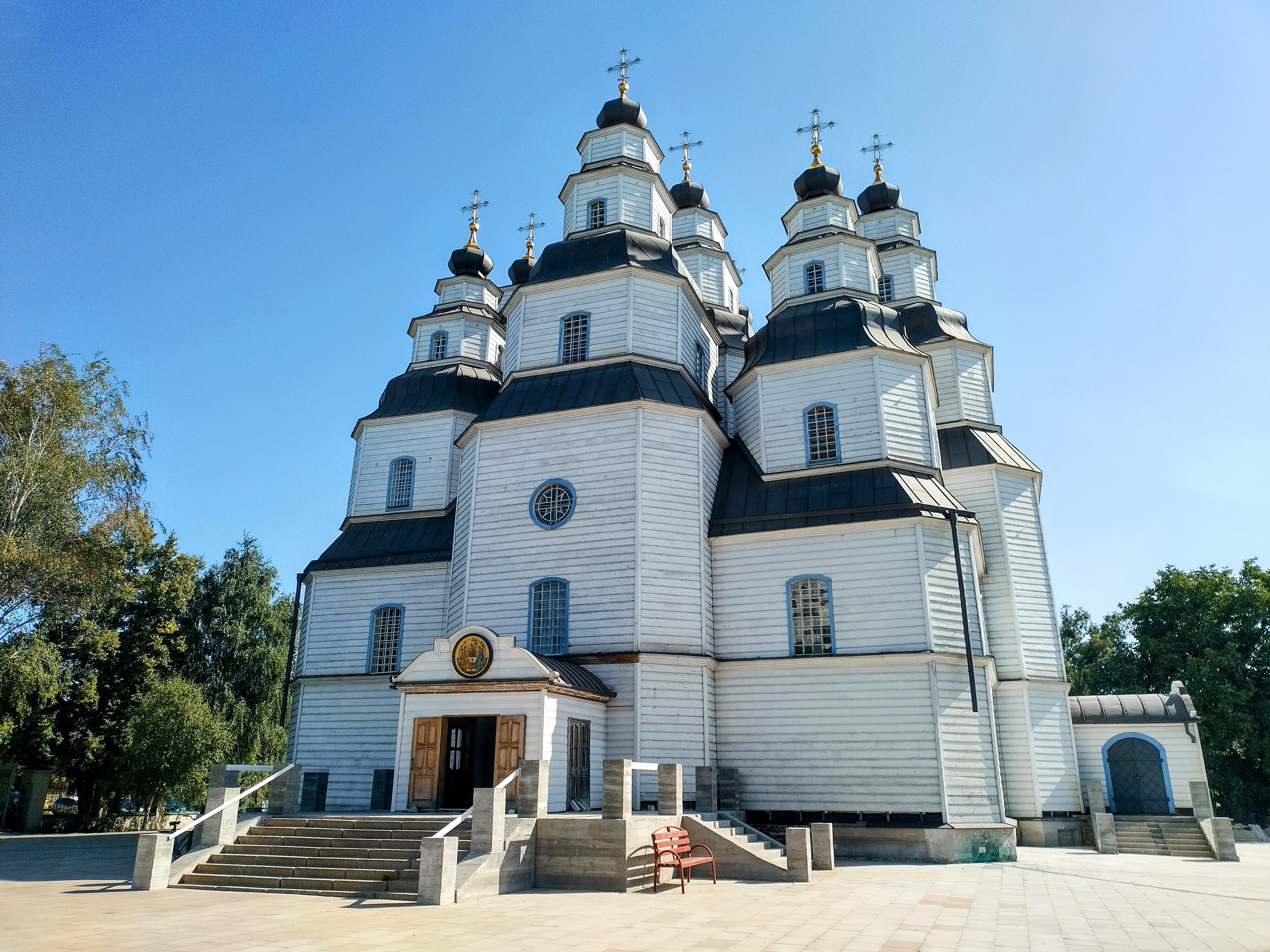
- The cathedral in 2023 after the renovations
- Trinity Cathedral
- 48°37′40″N 35°15′49″E
- Location: Samar, Samar Raion, Dnipropetrovsk Oblast
- Address: Soborna Square, 1
- Country: Ukraine
- Denomination: Ukrainian Orthodox Church (Moscow Patriarchate)

Architecture
- Architectural type: Cathedral
- Style: Ukrainian Baroque
- Groundbreaking: 1772
- Completed: 1781

Immovable Monument of National Significance of Ukraine
- Official name: Троїцький собор (дер.) (Trinity Cathedral (wooden))
- Type: Architecture
- Reference no.: 040049

The Trinity Cathedral (Ukrainian: Троїцький собор) is a church and architectural monument in Samar, Ukraine, the center of the Samara Palanka of the Zaporozhian Sich. It was built in 1772–1781 by the folk architect Yakym Pohribnyak out of wood.

In its construction and composition, the Trinity Cathedral stands out among wooden churches of Ukraine, as it is the only surviving wooden nine-domed church in the country.

== History ==
The founders of the Trinity Cathedral are kish otaman I. Chepiha, polkovnyk Antin Holovaty, Sich Cossacks, elder M. Petrenko and others.

The building is a nine-domed symmetrical composition, with the tallest dome in the center (around 65 meters), four lower domes in facing cardinal directions, and four even lower ones between them. It has three thrones, dedicated to the Trinity, apostoles Peter and Paul, and the Three Holy Hierarchs.

The Trinity Cathedral was renovated in 1830. In 1887–1888, it was rebuilt according to the old style with some changes by the restorer Oleksiy Pakhuchy. The bell tower of the cathedral was built after the reconstruction.

During the Soviet period, the cathedral was used as a storehouse. The attitude of the authorities towards the cathedral at the time is reflected in Oles Honchar's novel The Cathedral.

As of 2012, the monument was in need of renovation, as it was not renovated for over 130 years. The restoration begun in August of 2012. The building underwent another restoration in 2021.

== Gallery ==
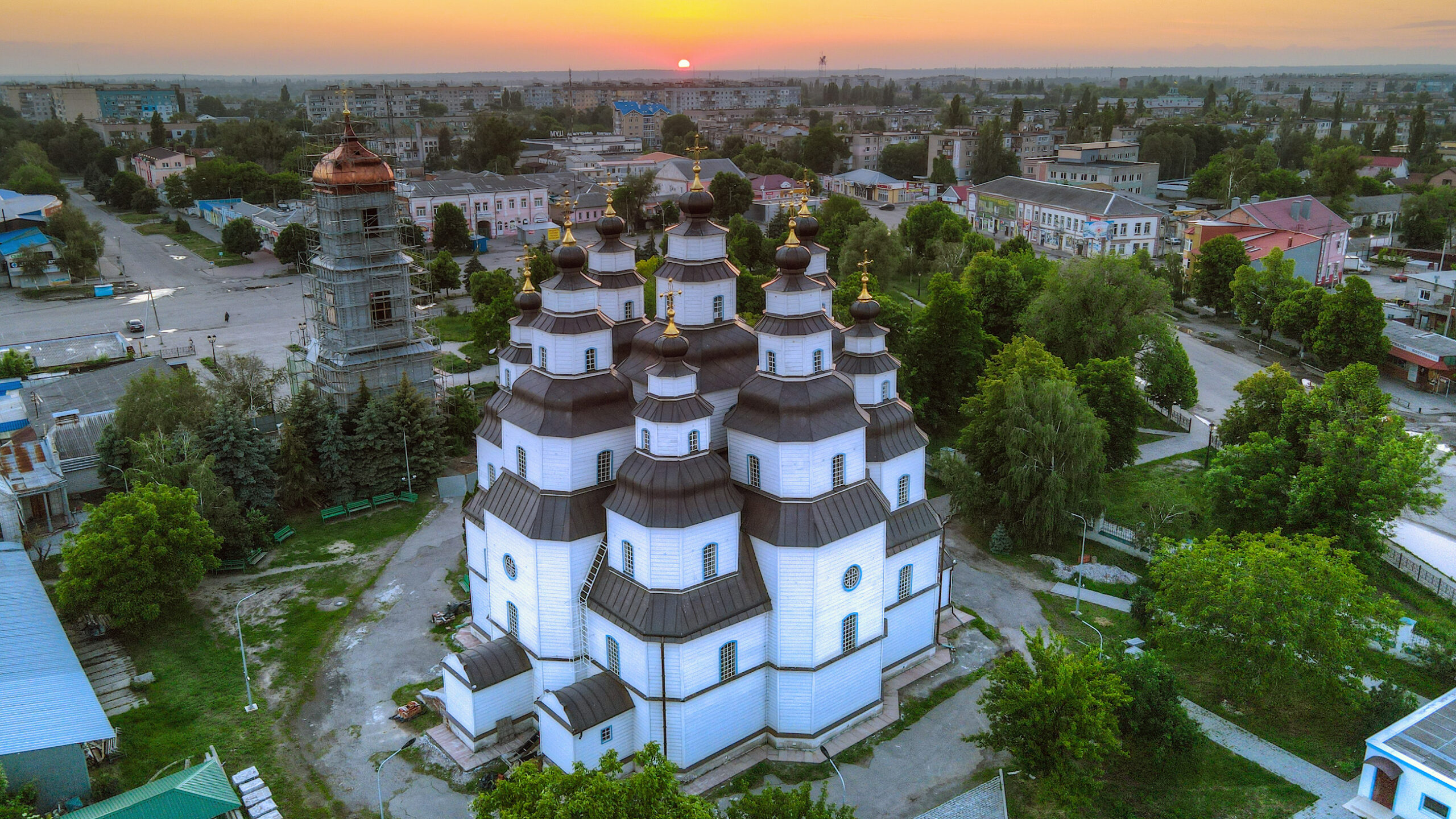
Aerial view of the cathedral

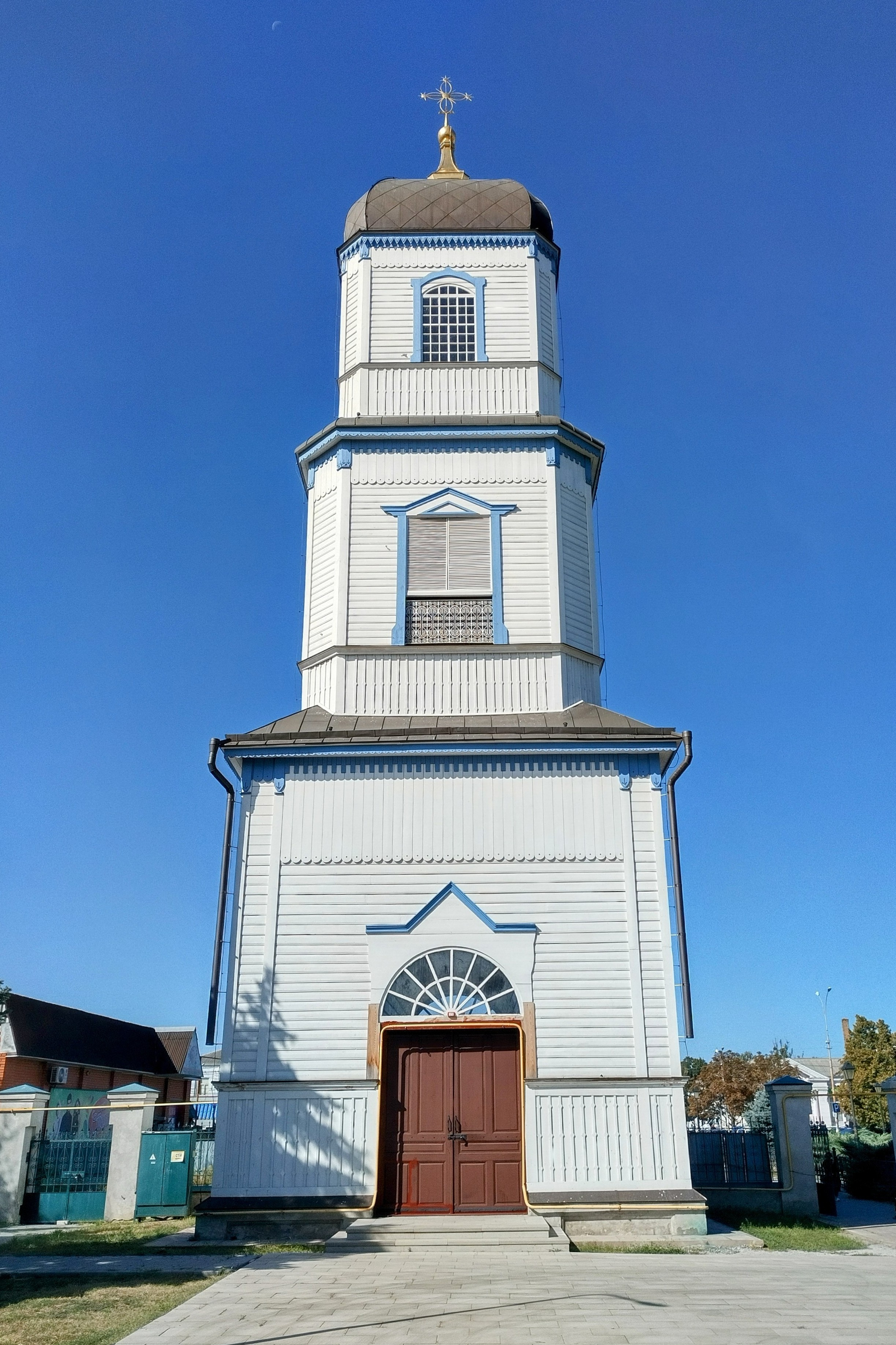
Bell tower

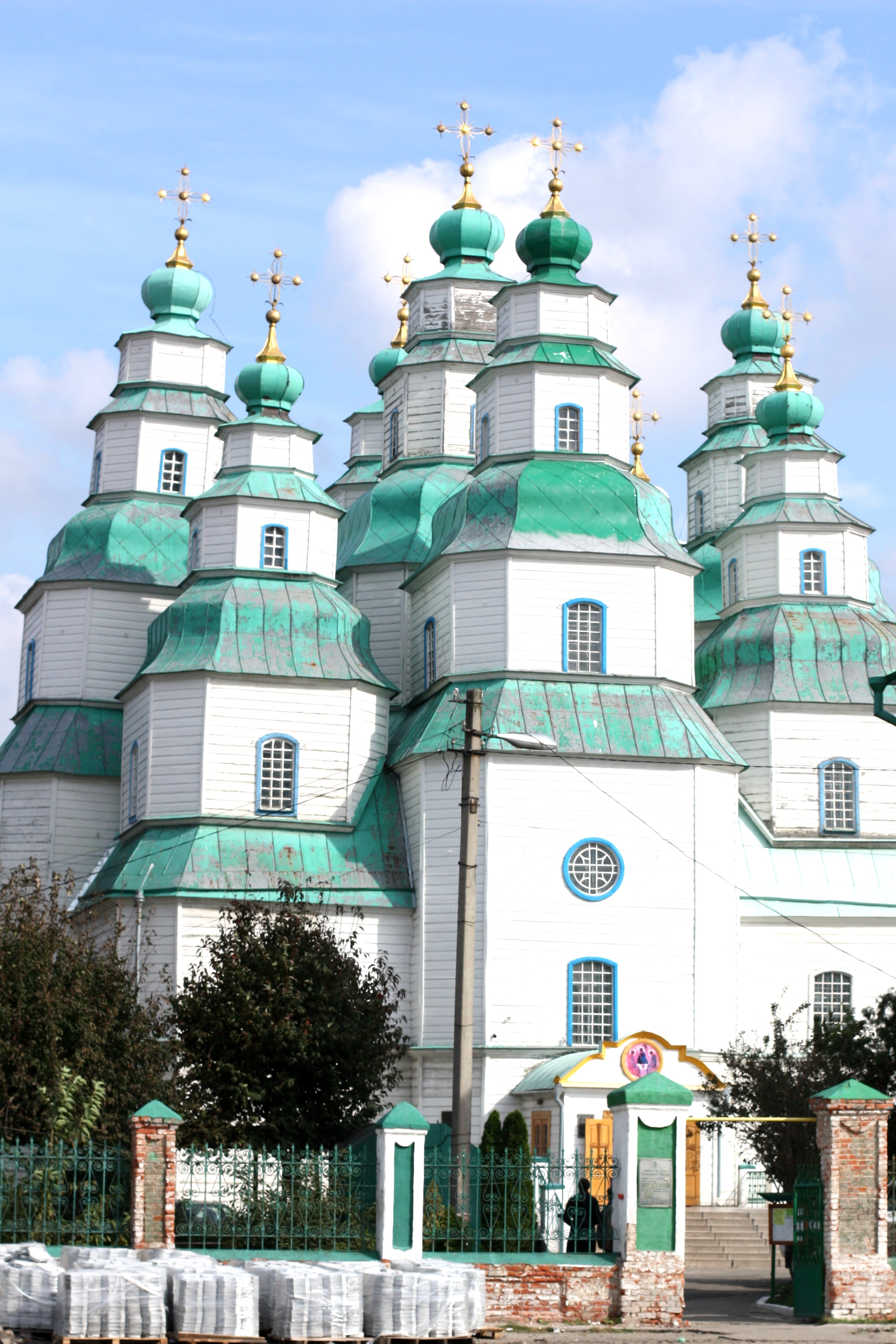
The cathedral in 2012

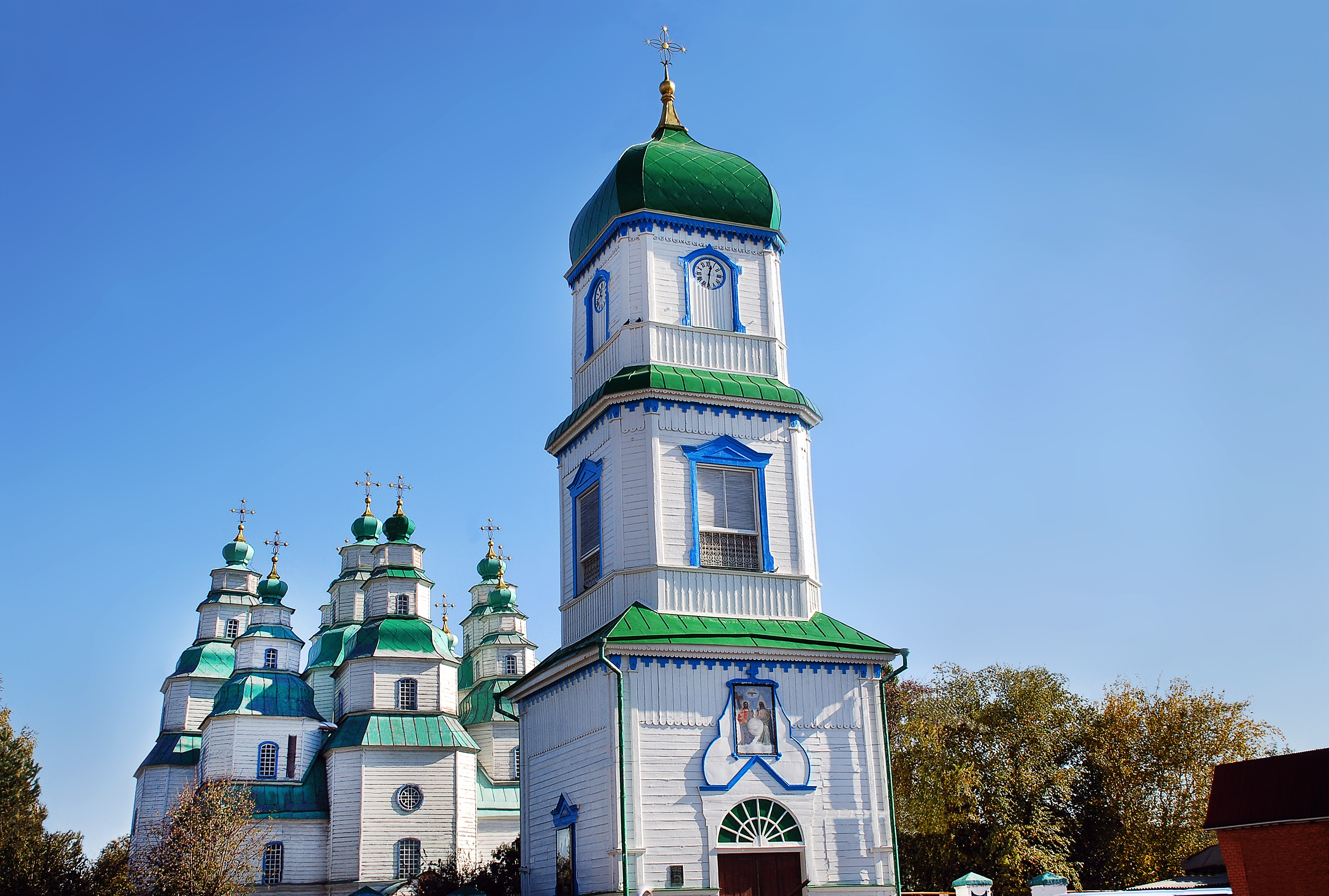
The cathedral and the bell tower in 2010

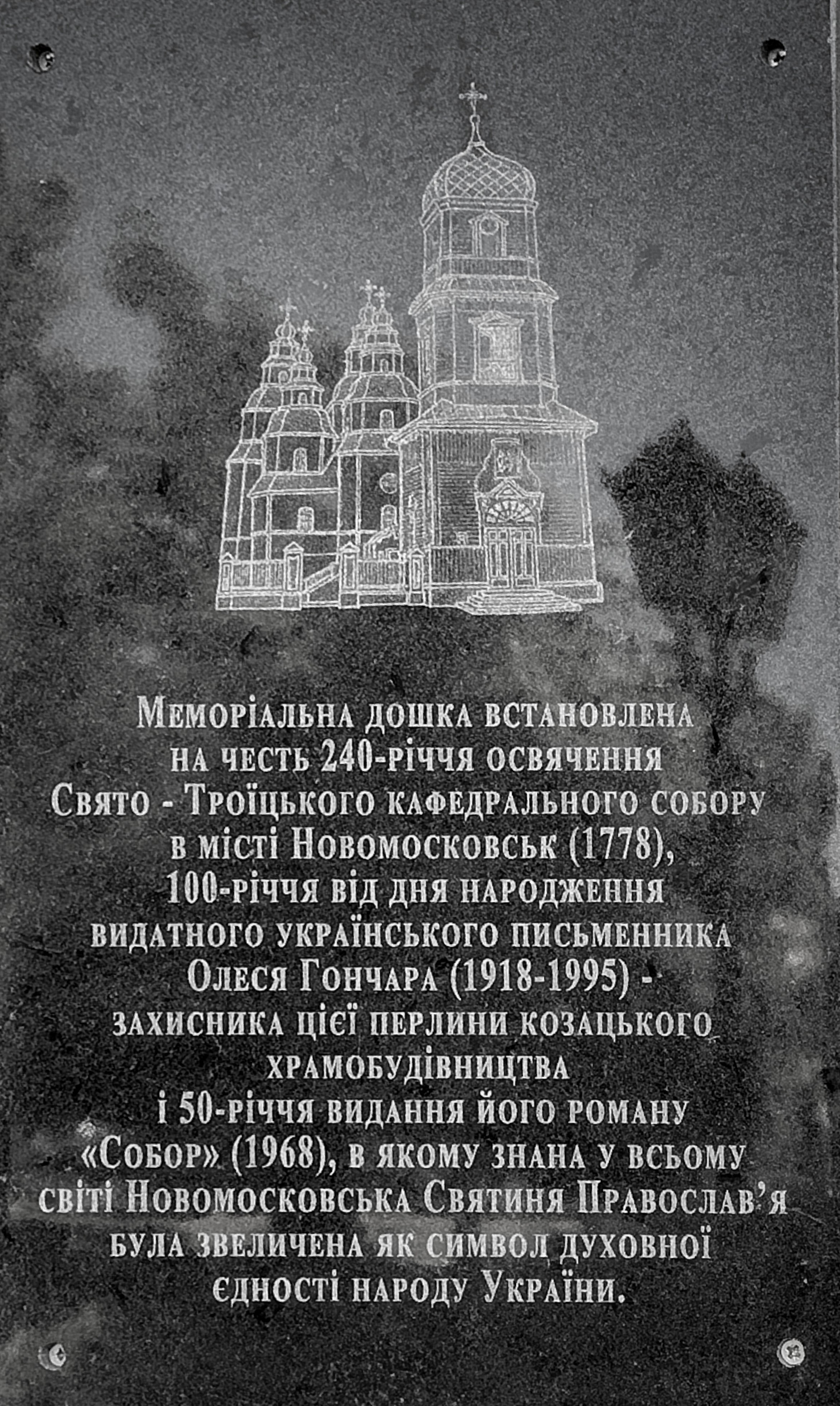
Plaque commemorating 240th anniversary of the consecration of the cathedral

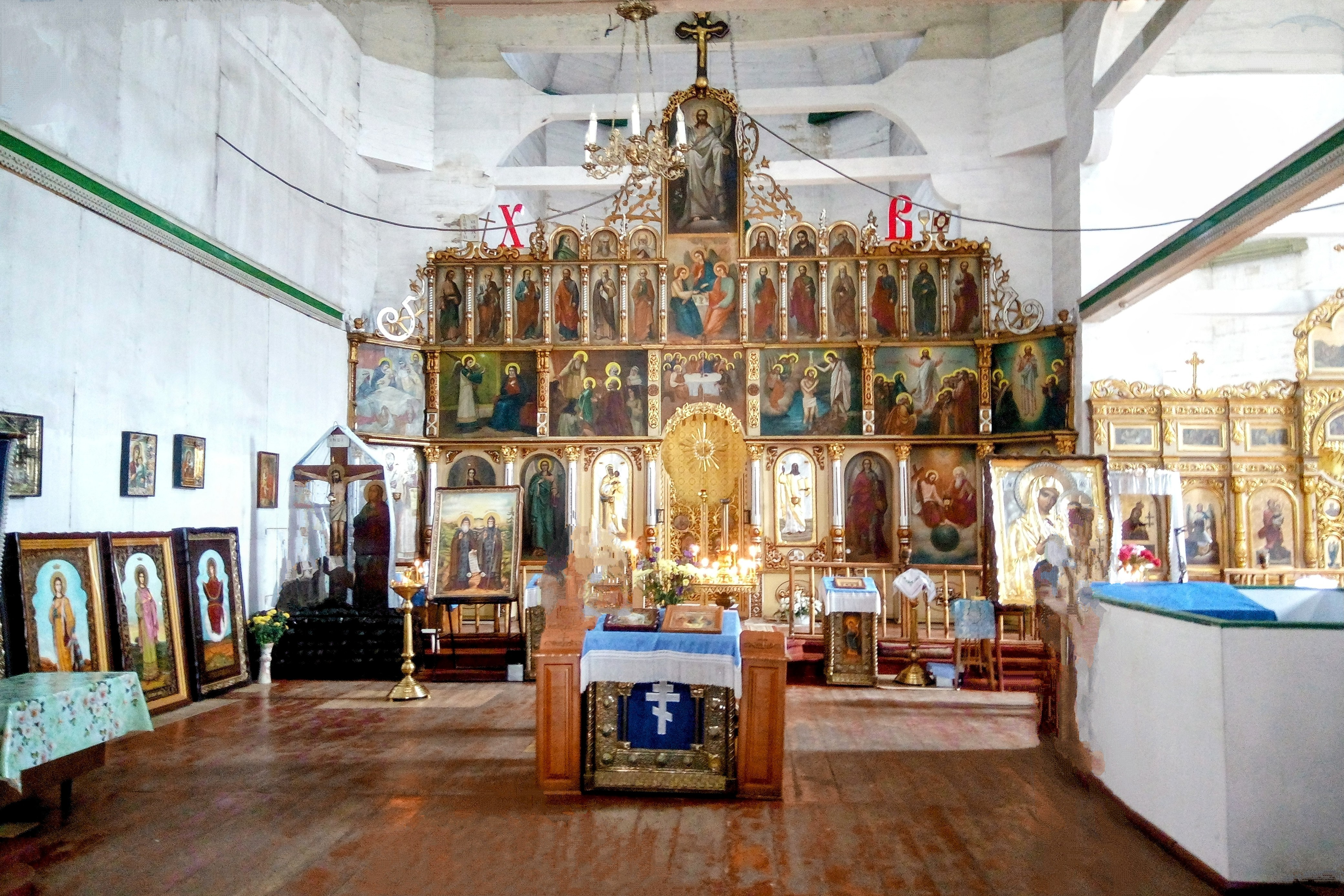
Interior during restoration

== Literature ==
- Догаль С. (м. Дніпропетровськ). Собор без риштування. Оспіваний у знаменитому романі Олеся Гончара храм може розвалитися будь-якої миті // Україна Молода. — 2020. — № 164 (7 вересня).
- Енциклопедія українознавства : Словникова частина : [в 11 т.] / Наукове товариство імені Шевченка ; гол. ред. проф., д-р Володимир Кубійович. — Париж — Нью-Йорк : Молоде життя, 1955—1995. — ISBN 5-7707-4049-3.
- Зінченко А. Л. Троїцький собор у Новоселиці (Новомосковську) // Енциклопедія історії України : у 10 т. / редкол.: В. А. Смолій (голова) та ін. ; Інститут історії України НАН України. — К. : Наукова думка, 2013. — Т. 10 : Т — Я. — С. 156. — ISBN 978-966-00-1359-9.
- Нариси історії архітектури Укр. РСР. — К., 1957.
- Харлан О. Неповторна пам'ятка архітектури запорозьких козаків
- П. Г. Запорожский храм в Новомосковске // Киевская старина. — 1888. — т. ХХ., январь, февраль, март. — С. 41-48.

== Sources ==
- Катерина Липа "Троїцький собор " // Український тиждень
- Троїцький собор у Новомосковську на сайті «Дерев'яні храми України»
- Троицкий Собор в Новомосковске. Фотопутешествие
