= Boris Polevoy =

Soviet writer

- Born: Boris Nikolayevich Kampov; 17 March [O.S. 4 March] 1908; Moscow, Russian Empire
- Died: 12 July 1981 (aged 73); Moscow, Soviet Union
- Notable work: Story of a Real Man

Boris Nikolayevich Polevoy (Russian: Бори́с Никола́евич Полево́й; 17 March [O.S. 4 March] 1908 – 12 July 1981) was a Soviet and Russian writer, screenwriter, journalist and war correspondent. He is the author of the book The Story of a Real Man about Soviet World War II fighter pilot Aleksey Maresyev.

== Biography ==
Boris Polevoy was a pseudonym for Boris Nikolayevich Kampov. He was born in Moscow in 1908, the son of a lawyer from a Russian Orthodox priest family. His parents were Nikolay Petrovich and Lidiya (Vasilyevna) Kampov. He was a graduate of the Tver Industrial Technical College (now Kalinin Industrial College).

Prior to starting his career as a writer, he worked as a technologist at a textile factory in Kalinin. As he began his journalism career in 1928, his talents were such that he was chosen to be patronized by Maxim Gorky.

His nom de plume has several variations based on transliterations. It was derived from translating Latin campus to Russian pole (″a field″).

He is perhaps best known for his reporting on the atrocities at Auschwitz soon after its liberation, which were the first to have been published in Pravda.

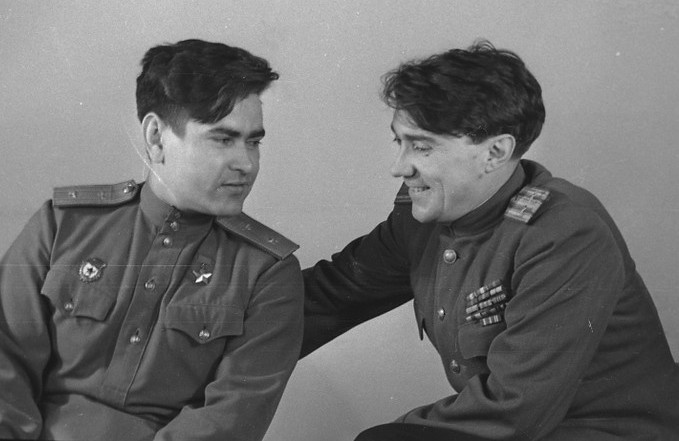
Boris Polevoy with Soviet fighter pilot Aleksey Maresyev, 1947

Polevoy began reporting for Pravda in 1939 or 1941. At the time, he was still serving in the Red Army as a lieutenant colonel. He would eventually attain the rank of colonel. He continued as a war correspondent for the newspaper until 1945.

Story About a True Man (also translated as Story of a Real Man), based on the life of Aleksey Maresyev, was an immensely popular novel. It was eventually made into an opera by Prokofiev. It was first published in English in 1952, and was reprinted in 1970. The protagonist was also honored by having an asteroid named for him.

He also served as a deputy to Supreme Soviet Russian Soviet Federated Socialist Republic (R.S.F.S.R.) from 1951 to 1966 and was a member of the Communist Party of the Soviet Union from 1940 until his death. As such he was involved in party politics as a member of various organizations. He was chief editor of the literary youth magazine Yunost (Юность) from 1962 until his death and was a board member of the Union of Soviet Journalists from 1959. He also served on the Soviet Peace Committee and Bureau World Peace Council.

For years, Polevoy exchanged a series of letters with Howard Fast, an American writer who had been a member of the Communist Party for 15 years, and best known as the author of Spartacus. The two had met briefly. Fast attempted to contact Polevoy when he decided to withdraw from the party, but there was no response from Polevoy. Fast decided to make his letters public. Polevoy eventually responded. Whether the delay was the result of the letters being intercepted or the result of Polevoy's reluctance to respond remains unclear.

Polevoy writes that when he received Fast's news, "that night I could not fall asleep. I kept thinking of your books. Their heroes crowded around me and together with them, as it were, I went over the whole situation. I felt sure that Gideon Jackson, who fought the good fight to the bitter end, would not have been less taken aback than I was by what happened. Neither would Spartacus, even if he did live at a time when there were neither the philosophical theories nor the practical experience that throw light over mankind's path today, a time without the cultural values of today or the progressive intellectuals bearing aloft the banner of peace at all circumstances."

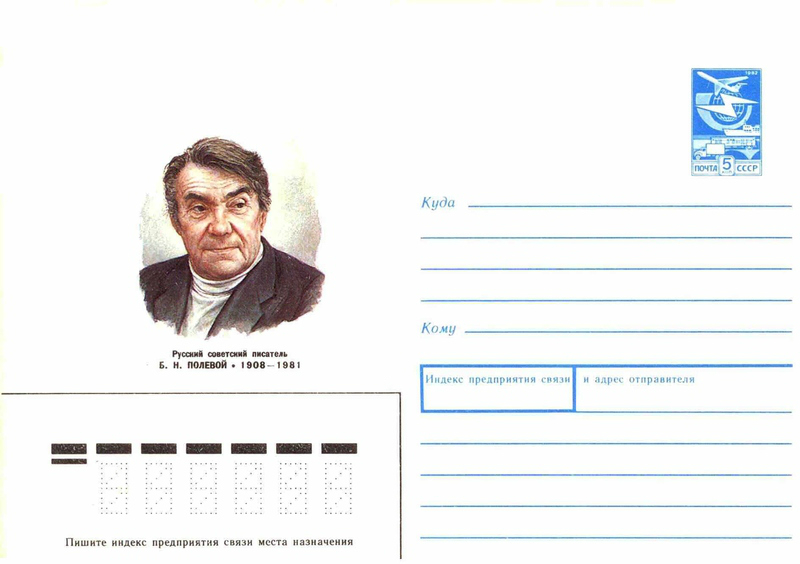
Soviet 1987 envelope featuring Boris Polevoy

His popularity with Soviet readers never diminished. "Polevoy's books, articles, and political commentaries gained him an international readership well before the end of the war. He remained influential until his death in 1981, at which time he was secretary of the all-powerful Union of Soviet Writers," wrote Heddescheimer. During his lifetime, Polevoy was named a Hero of Socialist Labour and awarded the Stalin Prize for literature, three Orders of Lenin, two Red Banners, the Red Star, and the Gold Medal of the World Peace Council.

== Personal life ==
He married Yulia Osipovna in 1939; the couple had two sons and a daughter.

== Select works ==
- Story of a Real Man (Russian: Повесть о настоящем человеке, 1947)
- Gold (Золото, 1950)
- Hot workshop (Горячий цех, 1940)
- From Belgorod to the Carpathians. From a Soviet War Correspondent's Notebook (От Белгорода до Карпат, 1945). English translation published by Hutchinson, 1945.
- We Are Soviet People (Мы советские люди, 1948). Short stories. Foreign Language Publishing House, 1949.
- He Came Back (Вернулся, 1949). Foreign Language Publishing House, 1957.
- Contemporaries (Современники, 1952)
- American Diaries (Американские дневники, 1956)
- At a Wild Shore (На диком бреге, 1962)
- In a Great Offensive (В большом наступлении, 1967)
- Doctor Vera (Доктор Вера, 1967)
- Selected Works (Избранные произведения, in two volumes, 1969)
- Creators of Seas (Создатели морей, 1975)
- 30 Years Later (Тридцать лет спустя, 1975
