= Tronka (novel) =

1963 novel by Oles Honchar

Tronka (Ukrainian: «Тронка», lit. ''Sheep bell'') is a 1963 Ukrainian-language novel in the form of a collection of short stories by Oles Honchar. The collection, of picturesque portraits tinged with tradition and Ukrainian nationalism was very well received in the climate of the Khrushchev thaw. Honchar was already highly regarded since his war trilogy The Standard Bearers (1946–48) and Tronka brought him the Lenin Prize in 1964. Nevertheless despite the acclaim that Tronka received Honchar felt that the work was a dead end, and insteadin his next work The Cathedral (1968) turned to more controversial material and style.

== See also ==
- List of Ukrainian-language writers
- Ukrainian literature
