= The Taming of the Shrew (Shebalin) =

The Taming of the Shrew (Russian Ukroshchenye stroptivoy, Cyrillic Укрощение строптивой) is a 1957 opera in four acts, five scenes by Vissarion Shebalin to a libretto by the Soviet musicologist Abram Akimovich Gozenpud, based on the comedy by William Shakespeare. Gozenpud utilized very little of Shakespeare's original text in his libretto, and eliminated many of the secondary characters and subplots from the play. His libretto does match the spirit of Shakespeare's play in its use of wit, the genuine passion of the story's lovers, and mixture of both lofty and coarse language.

== Performance history ==
Ukroshcheniye stroptivoy had its world premiere in a concert version at the Central House of Artists in Moscow on 1 October 1955. The opera was first staged at the Samara Opera and Ballet Theatre (then known as the Kuybïshev Opera) on 25 May 1957 under the baton of conductor S. S. Bergolts. Unhappy with the final scene between Katherine and Petruchio, Shebalin completely re-wrote the ending of the opera for the work's first staging at the Bolshoi Theatre in August 1957. In subsequent months the work was performed in Leningrad, Kiev and other cities.

The success of the opera enabled Shebalin to be partly rehabilitated and is considered by some Russian musicologists the "most successful Russian opera based on Shakespeare." The music is in a traditional high-spirited opera buffa idiom.

== Roles ==
Role	Voice type
Katarina, eldest daughter of Baptista Minola	soprano
Petruchio, a gentleman of Verona	baritone
Liuchentsio, suitor of Bianca	tenor
Gortenzio, suitor of Bianca	bass
Bianka, younger daughter of Baptista Minola	soprano
Baptista Minola, a rich merchant	bass
Biondello, servant of Baptista Minola	tenor
Curtis, servant of Petruchio	tenor
Groom, servant of Petruchio	bass
A tailor	tenor
Chorus of guests, servants, cooks and kitchen maids.

== Plot ==
Bianka, the youngest daughter of Paduan merchant Baptista Minola, has won the hearts of two young noblemen, Liuchentsio and Gortenzio, who are in competition for her affections. However, Baptista will not allow his youngest daughter to marry until his oldest daughter, the tempestuous Katerina, has married. The two young nobleman conspire together to marry off Katerina so they may freely compete for Bianca. The two men recruit Hortensio's visiting friend, the Verona nobleman Petruchio, to be Katarina's suitor. All does not go well at first, but by the opera's conclusion Petruchio and Katarina are happily in love and married.

== Recordings ==
The 1957 Bolshoi performance under Zdeněk Chalabala with Galina Vishnevskaya as Caterina, Yevgeny Kibkalo as Petruchio, Glafira Deomidova as Bianca and Arthur Eisen as Baptista, was recorded for radio and issued in 1961 on LP by Melodiya.
