= Gheorghe Bănciulescu =

Romanian pilot

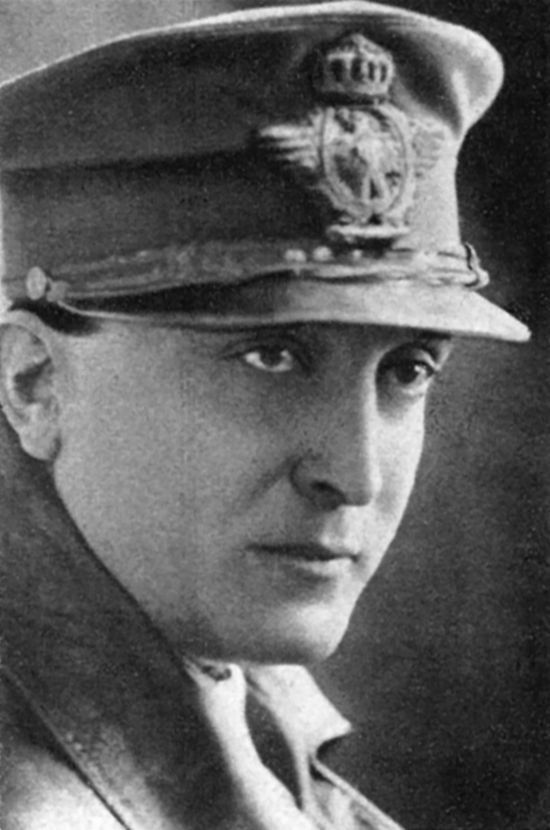
- Gheorghe Bănciulescu
- Born: 28 December 1898; Iași, Romania
- Died: 12 April 1935 (aged 36); Cairo, Egypt
- Known for: First pilot to fly with feet amputated
- Awards: Order of Aeronautical Virtue, Legion of Honor
- Aviation career
- First flight: 1919; Nieuport
- Famous flights: Paris–Le Bourget Airport (Rýmařov)–Bucharest
- Air force: 53 and 13 infantry regiments
- Battles: World War I
- Rank: Lieutenant-Commander

Gheorghe Bănciulescu (28 December 1898 – 12 April 1935) was a Romanian early aviator. He is believed to be the first pilot in the world to fly with his feet amputated.

== Biography ==
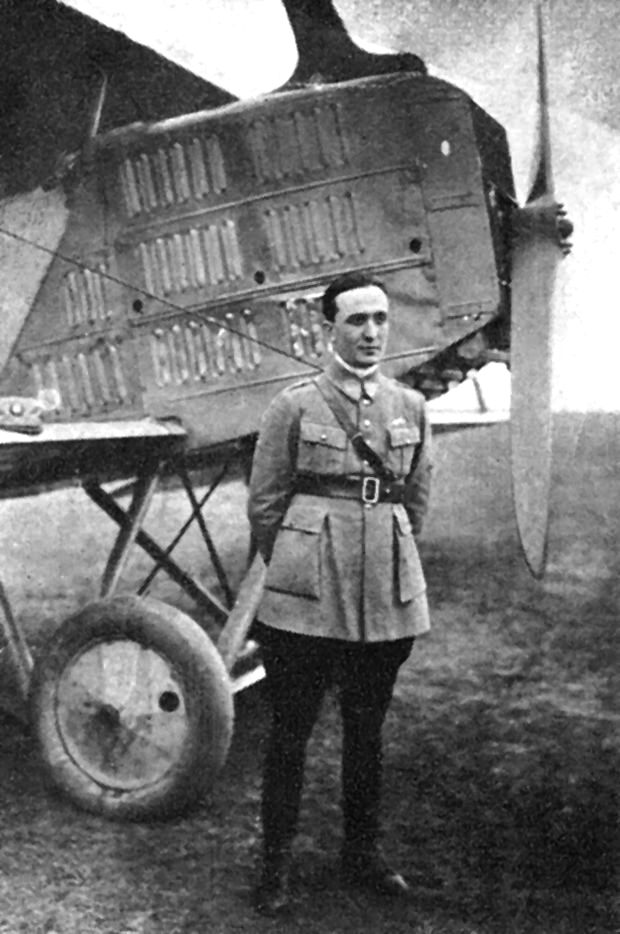
Gheorghe Bănciulescu in 1925

He was the son of an infantry officer, he attended military High School in Iași, then the Infantry School at Botoșani. During World War I, at 19, being a second lieutenant, he fought at Jiu, Namoloasa, Corbu and Mărăşeşti, Mărăşeşti having only 6 soldier survivors. The aerial battles he saw during the war led him to discover his passion for flight. His father tried to protect him from the enrollment in aviation. The determination of Nicolae Tanase, an experienced war pilot, was the inspiration for Bănciulescu to become a pilot. "I do not know what will come out of you, but the first condition is to love flying! I'm taking you under my responsibility. You are a pilot!" he said.

In 1919, Lieutenant Bănciulescu stood first to fly a Nieuport and on 12 September 1926 with the rank of captain, together with mechanic Ion Stoica aboard a Potez 25, provided by the Franco-Romanian Air Navigation Company, the two took off from Le Bourget Airport towards Bucharest to achieve a speed record. Stoica, born in 1897, by 1916 was a student at the School of Arts and Crafts in Galați, as a flight engineer, afterwards he graduated from the Flying School. He then enrolled as a volunteer in the Romanian Army during World War I, being sent afterwards to France, where he worked in the Lorraine-Dietrich factories.

After completing a distance of 1000 km in a time which, obviously, set a new record set above the city of Linz, the sky was shrouded by fog and all efforts to climb to a higher altitude, the plane crashed on a ridge of the mountain. The engine was crushed and Ion Stoica died on the way to the hospital, Bănciulescu had his both legs amputated, due to bleeding which could have been fatal. After agonizing days and nights spent in hospitals in Czechoslovakia, Romania and Germany, and after great effort to get used to wearing leg prosthesis, helped by the commander George Negrescu, and his friend Michael Pantazi, his desire to fly again was accomplished.

For the first time in world practice, Gheorghe Bănciulescu flew a plane with his legs amputated. This happened in July 1927, and in October the same year, Louis Barthou, the French President, gave him the Order of the Legion of Honour in the rank of Chevalier (Knight). In the spring of 1928 was held the first air meeting at Baneasa airfield, where thousands of people, including his wife, followed his aerial acrobatics. On that occasion his wife found out that her husband was flying again, despite the fact that he promised not to do so.

He started long-term air raids in 1933, six years after the tragic accident in Czechoslovakia. First, a raid of 8000 km through Europe, every day going through over 1,000 km. (The seventh day flew the route Paris – Strasbourg – Nuremberg – Prague – Vienna – Belgrade with a Romanian aircraft type SET-41). Last raid "to stick Commander" was part of the French civil aviation missions to identify and set air routes over the African continent. To carry out these missions, George Valentin Bibescu proposed Bănciulescu together with an experienced team, a telegraphist and the driver, which received the French modern aircraft, a Potez 9 AB with two engines. On 13 March 1935 they took off on a long and audacious raid on the route Paris – Marseille – Naples – Tunis – Tripoli – Benghazi – Cairo – Wadi Halfa – Khartoum – Al-Fashir – Abéché – Fort-Lamy – Fort-Archambault – Bangui – Bangassou – Juba – Atbara – Cairo. They faced a suffocating and exhausting heat, and sandstorms spouting to great heights, could destroy their engines. Although they passed their traps in Africa and landed in Cairo, Bănciulescu was exhausted from a tropical influenza with fever and delirium, he managed to beat the disease but tormented and exhausted, he died on 12 April 1935, at age 37.

His body was brought home and buried at Bellu Cemetery. It was swift passing away of his Gheorghe Bănciulescu, the world's first pilot who flew with prosthetic legs. The second pilot was Douglas Bader, the British RAF wing commander in World War II, followed by the Russians Zakhar Sorokin and Alexey Maresyev.

== Gallery ==
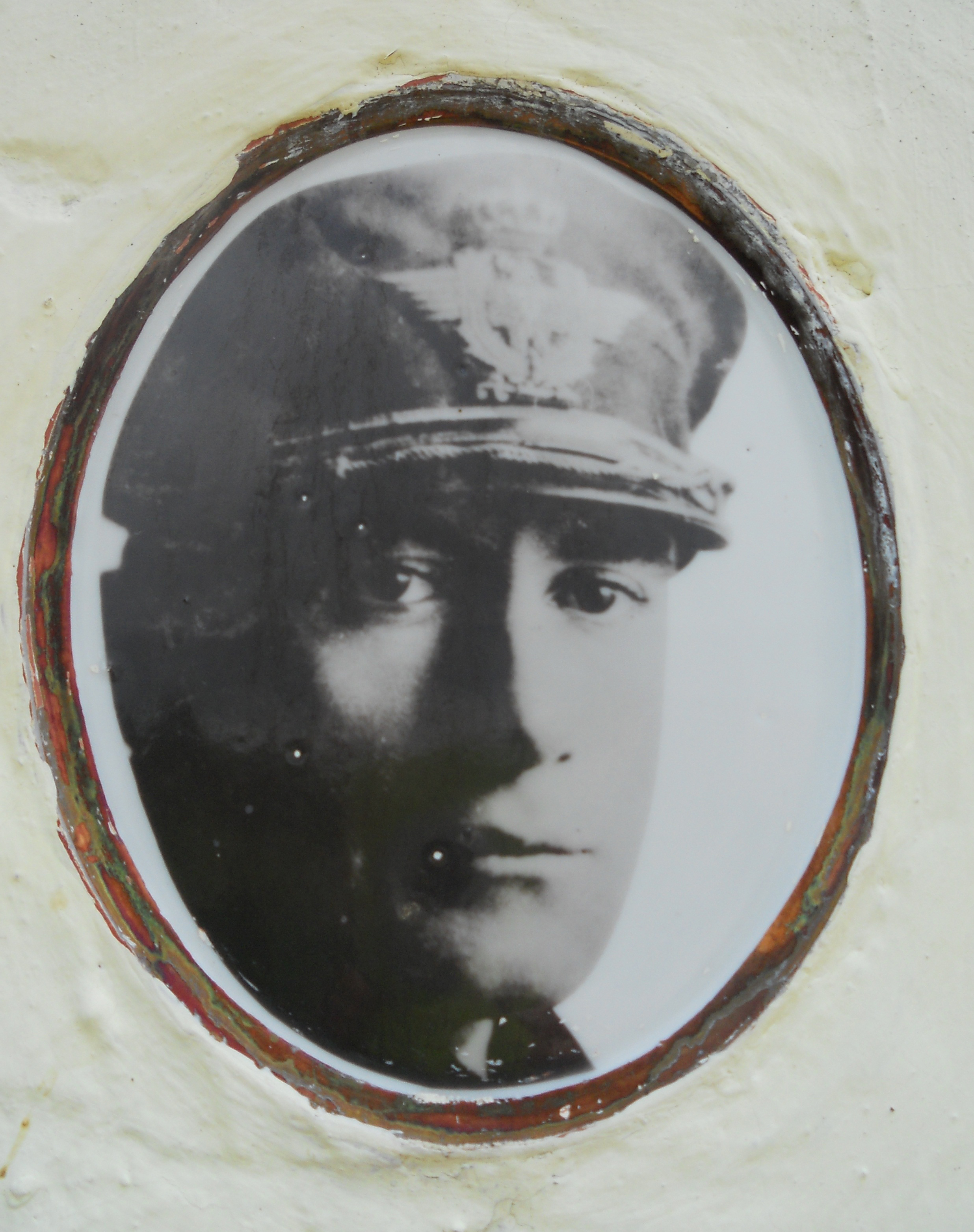
Funeral stone picture on Bănciulescu's grave

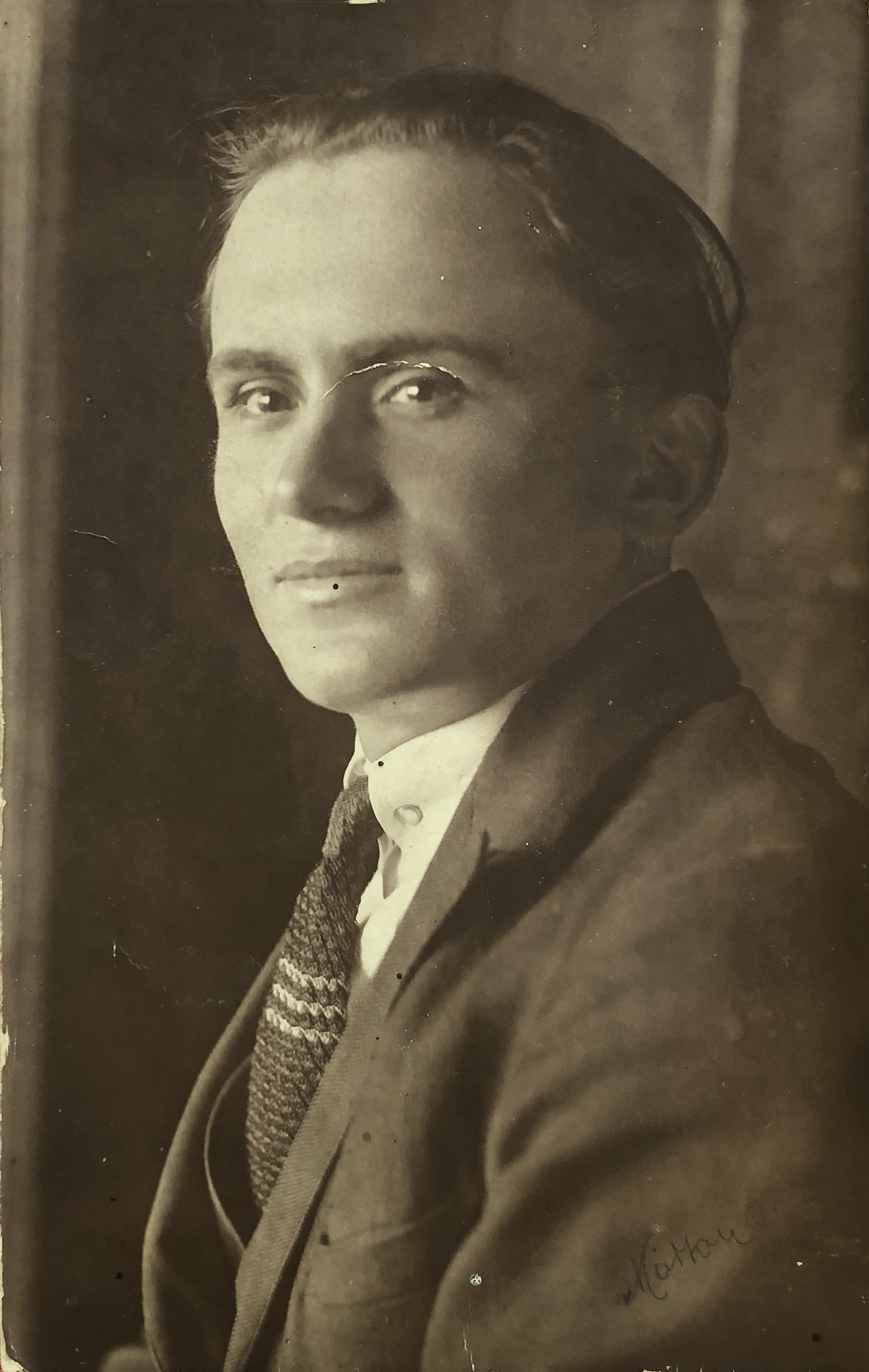
Portrait of Ion Stoica
