= Tamara Aleksandrovna Popatenko =

Soviet composer (1912–1991)

Tamara Aleksandrovna Popatenko (22 April 1912 - 28 Jan 1991) was a Russian composer who wrote hundreds of children’s songs as well as operettas and music for ballet, orchestra, radio and theatre. "I love children very much, and that is why the greater part of my creative work is dedicated to them," Popatenko said.

== Biography ==
Popatenko was born in Moscow. When she was eight years old, she began studying piano with her father Alexander. After attending a music school in Novocherkassk and a music college in Rostov, she transferred to Mosow Conservatory, where she graduated in 1938. Her teachers included Reinhold Glière, Genrikh Litinsky and Vissarion Shebalin.

Popatenko set texts by many writers to music, including Robert Burns, Boris Dubrovin, Margarita Ivensen, Pyotr Komarov, Agniya Kuznetsova, Mikhail Lermontov, Nina Naidenova, Alexander Ostrovsky, Sergey Vasilievich Pogorelovsky, Alexander Pushkin, Yakov Shvedov, Lyudmila Tatyanicheva, Viktor Viktorov, and Olga Vysotskaya.

Some of Popatenko’s songs for children were recorded commercially by the Soviet label Melody (D 032389-90).

== Works ==
Her works were published by Sovietski Compozitor and included:

=== Ballets ===
- Repkal
- The Giant Turnip

=== Chamber music ===
- Dreams (horn and piano)
- Eleven Easy Pieces (violin and piano)
- Humoresque (viola and piano)
- two string quartets
- Variations (cello and piano)

=== Incidental music ===
- Chudo-meinista (cartoon film)
- Magic Mill (animated film)
- music for radio productions

=== Operettas ===
- At the Edge of the Forest (for children)
- Gingerbread Man (for children)
- Winter Fairytale (for children)

=== Orchestral music ===
- Classic Suite
- Mountain Wind (cantata; for children’s choir, orchestra and narrator)
- Suite (for Russian folk instruments)
- Three Children’s Suites

=== Piano music ===
- Caprices

=== Theatrical music ===
- Lisa, Zayats i Petukh (musical)
- Lisa i Drozd (musical)
- Lyagushata i Tsaplya (musical)
- Snow Maiden (play by Ostrovsky)
- Teremok (musical)

=== Vocal music ===
- hundreds of songs for children
- Maple (for chorus)
- Sixteen Romances (text by French poets)
