= Zakhar Sorokin =

Soviet fighter pilot and flying ace

Zakhar Artyomovich Sorokin
- Захар Артёмович Сорокин
- Born: 17 March [O.S. 4 March] 1917; Glubokoe village, Tomsk Governorate, Russian Empire
- Died: 19 March 1978 (aged 61); Moscow, USSR
- Military career
- Allegiance: Soviet Union
- Branch: Naval Aviation
- Service years: 1937 – 1955
- Rank: Captain
- Conflicts: World War II
- Awards: Hero of the Soviet Union; Order of the British Empire

Zakhar Artyomovich Sorokin (Russian: Захар Артёмович Сорокин; 17 March [O.S. 4 March] 1917 – 19 March 1978) was a Soviet fighter pilot and flying ace who flew in combat with prosthetic feet from 1943 to 1945, having lost his feet to frostbite in 1941 after crashing in tundra in his MiG-3. He was awarded the title Hero of the Soviet Union and the Order of the British Empire for his perseverance, and after the war he wrote several memoirs.

== Early life ==
Sorokin was born on 17 March [O.S. 4 March] 1917 to a working-class Russian family in Glubokoe. His family moved to Krasnodar oblast in 1920, where he attended school and was employed as an assistant locomotive engineer while training at an aeroclub. After entering the navy in 1937 he graduated from the Yeisk Naval Aviation School in 1939. He then was assigned to the 72nd Mixed Aviation Regiment of the Black Sea Fleet, based in Sevastopol.

== World War II ==
Starting on 22 June 1941, Sorokin was engaged in World War II operations defending against Operation Barbarossa. The next month he was transferred to the Northern Fleet, where he flew in the squadron under the command of Boris Safonov. He was credited with his first aerial victory on 19 July 1941, and on 18 October 1941 he was promoted to deputy squadron commander. However, just one week later he was badly injured after a forced landing on the Arctic tundra, where he remained for four days before receiving medical attention, resulting in severe frostbite that ended up requiring his feet to be amputated. He received surgery in Kirov before returning to his regiment in March 1943. By the time he was promoted to the position of regimental navigator, the regiment had received the guards designation and been renamed as the 2nd Guards Fighter Aviation Regiment. On 19 August 1944 he was awarded the title Hero of the Soviet Union, and in December that year he transferred to the 11th Guards Fighter Aviation Regiment, where he was also the senior navigator. In total he flew 267 sorties, gaining 14 solo and one probable shootdowns during the war.

== Postwar ==
Almost immediately after the war he was discharged from the military since his need for prosthetic feet was considered to be a disability. However, he was able to re-enter the military in 1952 and posted to the 614th Fighter Aviation Regiment, but soon returned to the reserve in 1955. As a civilian he lived in Moscow, joined the Union of Journalists of the USSR, and authored 15 books. He died on 19 March 1978 and was buried in the Kuntsevo cemetery.

== See also ==
- Alexey Maresyev
- Gheorghe Bănciulescu
