= Galina Konstantinovna Smirnova =

Russian composer

Galina Konstantinovna Smirnova (20 January 1910 - 1980) was a Russian composer, musicologist, and radio music editor who used folk songs in her compositions and composed at least one film score.

Smirnova was born in Moscow. She studied at the Moscow Conservatory with Vissarion Shebalin from 1932 to 1940. Few details are available about her work as a musicologist and radio editor. Her music was published by Sovetskii Kompozitor and was recorded commercially by Albany Records U.S. Her compositions include:

== Chamber ==
- Sonatina in b minor (flute and piano)

== Film ==
- Italianskaia Suita, 10 Songs (text by Samuil Marshak and Gianni Rodari)

== Orchestra ==
- A Dedication to Leningrad (oratorio for children’s chorus and orchestra)

== Vocal ==
- Children’s Choral Pieces (vocal quartet)
- "Dobroye Utro"
- Northern Wind (vocal quartet)
- "Pesni Zapadnikh Slavyan" (text by Alexander Pushkin)
- "Pesnya Materei: Russian Folk Song"
- Pomni sorok pervyǐ (songs for low voice and piano)
- "Svadevnaya" (text by Aleksei Ivanovich Nedogonov)
