= 2173 Maresjev =

Dark background asteroid

Discovery
- Discovered by: L. V. Zhuravleva
- Discovery site: Crimean Astrophysical Obs.
- Discovery date: 22 August 1974

Designations
- Named after: Alexey Maresyev (Soviet war veteran)
- Alternative designations: 1974 QG_{1} · 1933 FN; 1938 DD_{2} · 1963 SW; 1968 OM · 1974 RZ_{1} 1974 TG
- Minor planet category: main-belt · (outer) background

Orbital characteristics
- Epoch 23 March 2018 (JD 2458200.5)
- Uncertainty parameter 0
- Observation arc: 84.52 yr (30,871 d)
- Aphelion: 3.4978 AU
- Perihelion: 2.7790 AU
- Semi-major axis: 3.1384 AU
- Eccentricity: 0.1145
- Orbital period (sidereal): 5.56 yr (2,031 d)
- Mean anomaly: 313.24°
- Mean motion: 0° 10^{m} 38.28^{s} / day
- Inclination: 14.424°
- Longitude of ascending node: 174.66°
- Argument of perihelion: 166.31°

Physical characteristics
- Mean diameter: 20.61±6.86 km 27.90±0.61 km 28.324±0.226 km 28.96 km (calculated); 29.265±0.242 km
- Synodic rotation period: 11.6±0.1 h
- Geometric albedo: 0.0568±0.0138; 0.0580 (assumed); 0.061±0.010; 0.068±0.004; 0.11±0.05
- Spectral type: C (assumed)
- Absolute magnitude (H): 11.30 · 11.40

2173 Maresjev, provisional designation 1974 QG_{1}, is a dark background asteroid from the outer regions of the asteroid belt, approximately 28 kilometers (17 miles) in diameter. It was discovered on 22 August 1974, by Soviet–Ukrainian astronomer Lyudmila Zhuravleva at the Crimean Astrophysical Observatory in Nauchnij, on the Crimean peninsula. It was named for Soviet war veteran Alexey Maresyev. The assumed C-type asteroid has a tentative rotation period of 11.6 hours.

== Orbit and classification ==
Maresjev is a non-family asteroid from the main belt's background population. It orbits the Sun in the outer asteroid belt at a distance of 2.8–3.5 AU once every 5 years and 7 months (2,031 days; semi-major axis of 3.14 AU). Its orbit has an eccentricity of 0.11 and an inclination of 14° with respect to the ecliptic.

The body's observation arc begins with its first observations as 1933 FN at Heidelberg Observatory in March 1933, or 41 years prior to its official discovery observation at Nauchnij.

== Physical characteristics ==
Maresjev is an assumed carbonaceous C-type asteroid.

=== Rotation period ===
In September 2007, a fragmentary rotational lightcurve of Maresjev was obtained from photometric observations by astronomers at the Oakley Observatory in the United States. Lightcurve analysis gave a rotation period of 11.6 hours with a brightness amplitude of 0.42 magnitude (U=1). As of 2018, no secure period has been obtained.

=== Diameter and albedo ===
According to the surveys carried out by the Japanese Akari satellite and the NEOWISE mission of NASA's Wide-field Infrared Survey Explorer, Maresjev measures between 20.61 and 29.265 kilometers in diameter and its surface has an albedo between 0.0568 and 0.11.

The Collaborative Asteroid Lightcurve Link assumes an albedo of 0.0580 and calculates a diameter of 28.96 kilometers based on an absolute magnitude of 11.4.

== Naming ==
This minor planet was named after Alexey Maresyev (1916–2001), a Soviet war veteran and fighter ace. His story served as a basis for the novel Story about a True Man (also translated as Story of a Real Man) by Boris Polevoy, which became a popular Russian book that was eventually made into an opera. It was first published in English in 1952, and was reprinted in 1970.

The official naming citation was published by the Minor Planet Center on 1 April 1980 (M.P.C. 5285).
