= Georgi Markov (Soviet writer) =

Soviet writer (1911–1991)

- Born: 19 April 1911; Novo-Kuskovo, Tomsk Governorate, Russian Empire
- Died: 25 September 1991 (aged 80); Moscow, Russian SFSR, Soviet Union
- Education: Tomsk State University
- Occupations: Novelist, dramatist, journalist, screenwriter
- Spouse: Agniya Kuznetsova

Georgi Mokeevich Markov (Russian: Георгий Мокеевич Марков; 19 April 1911 – 25 September 1991) was a Soviet novelist, playwright, screenwriter, journalist and public figure.

== Biography ==
Georgi Markov was born in the family of a Siberian bear hunter.

From 1927 to 1931 he worked at the Komsomol work in Tomsk. From 1930 to 1932 he studied at the evening department of Tomsk State University, but did not graduate. From 1931 to 1941 he was the editor of multiple magazines and newspapers (editor of the children's magazine "Comrade" and the newspaper "Bolshevik Smena" in Novosibirsk, the newspaper "Young Bolshevik" in Omsk) and began publishing his own works from 1936.

With the beginning of the Great Patriotic War from June 1941, he was a war correspondent for the newspaper “At the Battle Post” of the Trans-Baikal Front, and participated in the defeat of the Kwantung Army. He became a member of the Union of Soviet Writers in 1943. With the rank of major, he was demobilized from the army in December 1945.

In 1956 he moved to Moscow. From 1956 to 1971 Markov was secretary of the board of the Union of Soviet Writers of and at the same time from 1959 to 1965 he was chairman of the board of the Moscow branch of the Union of Writers of the RSFSR. From July 2, 1971, to June 28, 1986, he served as first secretary of the board of the Union of Writers of the USSR. From June 28, 1986, to January 18, 1989, Markov Chairman of the Board of the Union of Writers of the USSR.

Markov was a Communist Party official and was a member of its Central Committee from 1971 to 1990. In 1973, he signed a Letter from a group of Soviet writers condemning Aleksandr Solzhenitsyn and Andrei Sakharov. In 1978, he donated his Lenin Prize for the creation of a library in his native village of Novo-Kuskovo.

He was Chairman of the Committee for Lenin and State Prizes of the USSR in the field of literature, art and architecture from 1979 as well as Chairman of the Literary Heritage Commission M. S. Shaginyan.

Being a critic of perestroika Markov resigned from the post of chairman of the board of the Union of Writers in January 1989. He died after a serious long illness on September 25, 1991, in Moscow. He was buried at the Troekurovskoye Cemetery.
