= Leonid Rudnytzky =

Ukrainian-American linguist and scholar (1935–2024)

- Леонід Рудницький

Personal details
- Born: September 8, 1935 Lwów, Poland (now Lviv, Ukraine)
- Died: December 8, 2024 (aged 89) U.S.
- Spouse: Irene Rudnytzky
- Education: La Salle University; University of Pennsylvania; Ukrainian Free University

Leonid Rudnytzky (Note: Ukrainian: Леонід Іванович Рудницький, romanized: Leonid Ivanovych Rudnytskyi) (September 8, 1935 – December 8, 2024) was a Ukrainian-born American linguist and professor of German, Slavic and Ukrainian studies. He was a member of the National Academy of Sciences of Ukraine, and co-editor of numerous American and Ukrainian encyclopedias. Rudnytzky died in the U.S. on December 8, 2024, at the age of 89.

He received honorary doctorates from several universities in Europe and the United States. Two weeks before his death, Metropolitan Archbishop of the Ukrainian Catholic Archeparchy of Philadelphia Borys Gudziak awarded Rudnytzky and his wife Irene (née Ieviņš) with the Metropolitan’s 2024 Lifetime Service Award.

== Awards ==
- Lindback Award for Distinguished Teaching for teaching at La Salle University in Philadelphia (U.S. – 1966)
- Ivan Franko Literary Prize of the Union of Writers of Ukraine for research in Franko studies (Kyiv, Ukraine – 1993)
- Honorary Award of the President of Ukraine for his contribution to the development of the Ukrainian state (Kyiv, Ukraine – 1996)
- Basilian Humanitarian Award from the Order of Basilian Sisters (Sestry Vasilianky) (Philadelphia, U.S. – 1997)
- Order of Prince Yaroslav the Wise – IV degree (Kyiv, Ukraine – 2003)
- Knight of the Sovereign Military Order of Malta (U.S. – 2004)
- Pro Universitate Medal of the Ukrainian Free University (Munich, Germany – 2005)
- Diploma of Laureate and Medal of Myhailo Hrushevsky (Lviv, Ukraine – 2005)

== Bibliography ==
- Kupchynsky, O. (2008). "Leonid Rudnytzky – scientist, teacher, social and cultural worker, preface to the collection of scientific papers in honor of Leonid Rudnytzky, Lviv" Philadelphia, Pennsylvania, U.S. – p. 4–34.
- Rudnytzky, N. (2008). "Materials for a bibliography of works by Leonid Rudnytzky, preface to collection of scientific papers in honor of Leonid Rudnytzky, Lviv" Philadelphia, Pennsylvania, U.S. – p. 35-59.
- Pavlychko, D. (2008). "The Power of disobedience, preface to the collection of scientific papers in honor of Leonid Rudnytzky, Lviv" Philadelphia, Pennsylvania, U.S. – p. 63-68.
