= Oles Honchar =

Ukrainian writer and politician (1918–1995)

Hero of Ukraine Oles Honchar
- Олесь Гончар
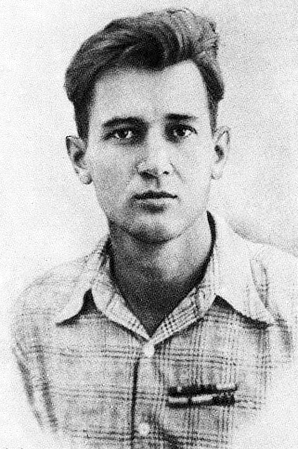
- Honchar in 1950
- Born: Oleksandr Terentiiovych Bilychenko (Олександр Терентійович Біличенко); 3 April 1918; Lomivka, Yekaterinoslav Governorate, Ukrainian People's Republic
- Died: 14 July 1995 (aged 77); Kyiv, Ukraine
- Resting place: Baikove Cemetery
- Monuments: Kyiv
- Citizenship: Soviet Union; Ukraine
- Education: Academician
- Alma mater: Dnipropetrovsk University; Shevchenko Institute of Literature (NANU)
- Occupations: academician, prosaic, civil activist
- Years active: 1938–1995
- Organization(s): Writer's Union of Ukraine; World Peace Council
- Notable work: The Cathedral
- Style: Socialist realism
- Title: Deputy of Verkhovna Rada
- Political party: CPSU (1946–1990); Rukh
- Movement: Ukrainian republican committee in protection of peace Society of Ukrainian Language
- Spouse: Valentyna Danylivna Honchar
- Parents: Terentiy Sydorovych Bilychenko (?–1918) (father); Tetyana Havrylivna Honchar (?–1921) (mother)
- Relatives: Oleksandra Sova (older sister)
- Awards: Hero of Ukraine; Hero of Socialist Labour; Shevchenko National Prize numerous others (civil and military)

Oleksandr "Oles" Terentiiovych Honchar (Ukrainian: Олекса́ндр "Оле́сь" Тере́нтійович Гонча́р; né Bilychenko [Біличе́нко]; 3 April 1918 – 14 July 1995) was a Soviet and Ukrainian writer and public figure. He also was a veteran of World War II and member of the Ukrainian parliament.

== Biography ==
=== Early years ===
It has commonly been written that Oles Honchar was born in Sukha sloboda (now Sukhe village) in Kobelyaky uyezd, Poltava Governorate, Russian Empire in a family of factory workers, Terentiy Sydorovych and Tetiana Havrylivna Bilychenko (née Honchar). However more recently found documents from the regional archives of Dnipropetrovsk Region tell that he was born in a village of Lomivka, which just before World War II was incorporated into the city of Dnipropetrovsk. His mother died when he was three, and his father perished on a job site later in 1941. Being left parentless, he was taken by his maternal grandparents to live in the village of Sukhe. Living with his maternal grandparents, Oleksandr took their last name and, thus, became known as Oles Honchar (Oles is a nickname of Oleksander).

Since 1925, Honchar studied first in his village (Sukhe), later in the village of Khorishky (today Kozelshchyna District). In 1933 he finished a seven-year school in the neighboring village of Breusivka. Honchar then found a job with the local newspaper "Expanded front" (Kozelshchyna District). From 1933 to 1937 he studied journalism at the Kharkiv vocational school of Nikolai Ostrovsky (author of How the Steel Was Tempered). Afterward, Honchar worked as a teacher in a village of Manuilivka (today Derhachi District) near Kharkiv and as a journalist in the Kharkiv Region newspaper Lenin's shift. In 1937 he started to publish his first works, mostly short stories, through various republican publishers: Literary Newspaper, Pioneeria, Komsomolets of Ukraine, and Young Bolshevik.

=== World War II and first recognition ===
In 1938, Honchar enrolled into the Department of Philology of Kharkiv University. During his studies, he wrote such novellas as Ivan Mostovy, Cherries Bloom, and Eaglet, and the story Stokozove Field. During his third year at university his studies were interrupted by World War II, and in June 1941 he volunteered to join the Red Army as part of a student battalion of the 72nd Guards Rifle Division. During the war, he was a staff sergeant and later the first sergeant of a mortar battery. Being wounded twice, Honchar also earned numerous awards including the Soviet Order of Glory. During that time, he wrote poems (the collection of poetry Frontlines Poems) that were published in 1985 as well as started to work on his important future novel trilogy The Flag-Bearers.

After the war, he resumed his studies at Dnipropetrovsk University in the Department of Philology, where he started to write the first part of his trilogy The Flag-Bearers: Alps. The novel was noticed by Yuri Yanovsky who, being a chief editor of the magazine Fatherland at that time, published it in 1946. He soon invited Honchar to Kyiv, where Oles entered an aspirantura at the Shevchenko Institute of Literature of the National Academy of Sciences of Ukraine. In Kyiv Honchar received an apartment (#65) in the specially designed Rolit building (68 Bohdan Khmelnytsky Street). Yanovsky became a kind of a mentor for the young writer. In 1975 Honchar wrote a novel dedicating to him: Blue Towers of Yanovsky. In 1947 Oles published Earth is Rumbling about the underground movement of the Poltava Region, as well as the second book of his The Flag-Bearers trilogy, Blue Danube. This book, which tells about the liberating mission of the Soviet Army in Europe, was noticed by officials, critics, and the public, and won the young writer the Stalin Prize in 1948.

=== Further career and literature accolades ===
In the 1940s and 1950s, the writer continued to develop a war theme in his several novellas as well as publishing the last book of The Flag-Bearers trilogy, Golden Prague. A new theme, the peaceful life of people and the moral aspects of their relationships, began to develop alongside his traditional military themes. Novellas and novels in that direction (Mykyta Bratus, 1950; Let a Light Burn, 1955) lay the groundwork for Honchar's artistry in the 1960s and 1970s. The historical-revolutionary dilogy Tavria (1952) and Perekop (1957), commemorating to the events of the civil war in the Southern Ukraine, is considered his weakest work. Around that time Honchar was starting public and journalistic activities. He travelled abroad, which resulted in the short story collections Meeting with Friends (1950) and China Up-Close (1951). For his literary work, in 1959 Honchar was elected chairman of the Union of Ukrainian Writers (1959–1971) and secretary of the USSR Union of Writers.

In 1960, the novel Person and Weapon was published, which opened a new page in the artistry of Oles Honchar. The romantic-philosophical direction of the piece, the emphasis on intimate matters of the life and death of a person, and problems of the indestructibility of the morality of human spirit set apart this novel, which is based on the writer's recollections about the student volunteer battalion during the war. The novel was awarded the newly-created Shevchenko Prize in 1962. The second part of the dilogy, the novel Cyclone (1970), was written after a break. The story received a sudden continuation where the aged hero from Person and Weapon becomes a film director and shoots a movie about war.

The collection of short stories Tronka (1963) was the first major work of Honchar commemorating a contemporary peaceful life. Constructed in the form of an original "wreath of novellas" revealing different aspects of life of ordinary people, residents of the Ukrainian steppe, the novel paints a complete panorama of characters, images, and situations. Tronka was the first work of Ukrainian literature to acutely address the problem of Stalinism eradication and the struggle of old with new. On the wave of the Khrushchev thaw the novel was awarded the Lenin Prize in 1964.

=== Cathedral and later career ===
Honchar's next novel, The Cathedral, was published in 1968. In comparison with Tronka, the novel is much closer to traditional realism with broadly distinct positive and negative characters. At the center of the story is the struggle for the revival of spirituality, for the historical memory of people as the foundation of decency in relationships. The Novomoskovsk Holy Trinity Cathedral (Dnipropetrovsk Oblast) served as Honchar's inspiration for the novel's cathedral. The Dnipropetrovsk Region Communist Party leader Oleksiy Vatchenko recognized himself in the image of a character in the novel: the soulless party member opportunist who put his father in a retirement home. Being a friend of Leonid Brezhnev, Vatchenko requested a ban on the novel. The novel was published only in magazines, while the already printed copies of the book were confiscated and the translation to the Russian language was suspended. The book was banned despite the attempts to protect the piece, such as articles by Mykola Bazhan and others. The only thing that saved Honchar from further prosecutions was his position in the Writer's Union.

In his later works, Honchar continued to raise the contemporary morale-ethical issue (Your Dawn, 1980) and the theme of young searches romance (Brigantina, 1973). In 1980, he released the book Writer's Reflections where he summarized his artistic work. From 1962 to 1990 Honchar was a People's Deputy in the Supreme Council of the Soviet Union. In 1978 he was awarded the title of "Academician" and membership at the Ukrainian Academy of Sciences. With the fall of the Soviet Union, Honchar was one of the creators of the Society of Ukrainian Language and the People's Movement of Ukraine. In 1990 he left the Communist Party of Soviet Union during the Revolution on Granite. In 1991, Honchar released a new book: By That We Live. On the Path of Ukrainian Revival. In 1992, the University of Alberta recognized him with an honorary doctorate.

Honchar is also known for urging the president of Ukraine to rebuild the St Michael's Golden-Domed Cathedral in Kyiv, which was destroyed by the Soviet authorities.

Oles Honchar was buried at Baikove Cemetery in Kyiv.

== Awards and prizes ==
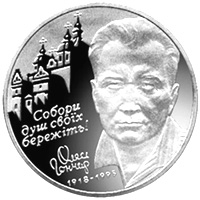
Commemorative coin of Ukraine featuring Honchar

Civil

- Stalin Prize (1948), for the first two books of the novel "Guide-on Bearers" (1946–47)
- Stalin Prize (1949), for the third book of the novel "Guide-on Bearers" (1948)
- Order of Lenin (3 awards in 1960, 1967, 1978)
- National Shevchenko Prize (1962), for novel "Person and weapon" (1960)
- Lenin Prize (1964), for novel "Tronka" (1963)
- Order of the October Revolution (1971)
- Hero of Socialist Labor (31 March 1978), for great achievements in development of Soviet literature, productive public work, and in regard to the sixtieth birthday of the writer Oles Honchar by the order of the Presidium of the Supreme Council of the Soviet Union (Order of Lenin and medal of Sickle and Mallet)
- USSR State Prize (1982), for novel "Your dawn" (1980)
- Order of Friendship of Peoples (1982)
- Order of the Red Banner of Labour (1984, 1988)
- Hero of Ukraine (2005), posthumously
- Honor Badge of Excellence of the President of Ukraine
- Medal "Veteran of Labour"
- Medal "In Commemoration of the 1500th Anniversary of Kyiv"
- Alexander Fadeyev Gold Medal
- S. Nejman Prize (Czech Republic)

Military

- Order of Red Star (1945)
- Order of Glory, III degree (1945)
- Order of the Patriotic War, I degree (1985)
- Medal For Courage (3 medals in 1944 and 1945)
- Medal "For the Capture of Berlin"
- Jubilee Medal "In Commemoration of the 100th Anniversary of the Birth of Vladimir Ilyich Lenin"
- Medal "For the Victory over Germany in the Great Patriotic War 1941–1945"
- Medal "Twenty Years of Victory in the Great Patriotic War 1941–1945"
- Medal "Thirty Years of Victory in the Great Patriotic War 1941–1945"
- Medal "Forty Years of Victory in the Great Patriotic War 1941–1945"
- Medal "50 Years of Victory in the Great Patriotic War 1941–1945"
- Medal "50 Years of the Armed Forces of the USSR"
- Medal "60 Years of the Armed Forces of the USSR"
- Jubilee Medal "70 Years of the Armed Forces of the USSR"

== Major works ==
- The Flag-Bearers, about the Great Patriotic War; two Stalin Prizes
- The Cathedral

Cultural offices
| Preceded by Borys Oliynyk | Shevchenko National Prize Committee Chair; 1992–1995 | Succeeded by Volodymyr Yavorivsky |
