= Aleksey Maresyev =

Soviet World War II flying ace

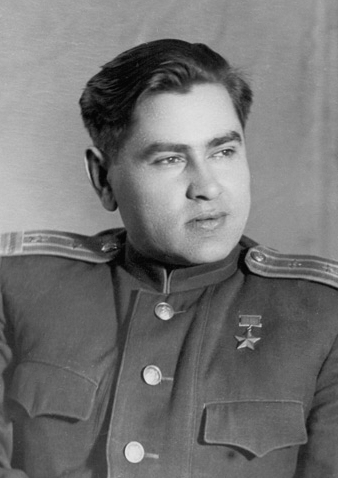
- Born: Aleksey Petrovich Maresyev; May 20, 1916; Kamyshin, Saratov Governorate, Russian Empire
- Died: May 18, 2001 (aged 84); Moscow, Russia
- Military career
- Allegiance: Soviet Union
- Branch: Soviet Air Force
- Service years: 1937–1946
- Rank: Colonel
- Unit: 63rd Guards Fighter Aviation Regiment
- Conflicts: World War II
- Awards: Hero of the Soviet Union

Aleksey Petrovich Maresyev (Russian: Алексей Петрович Маресьев; 20 May 1916 – 18 May 2001) was a Soviet and Russian military pilot who became a Soviet fighter ace during World War II despite becoming a double amputee.

== Biography ==
Before joining the army in 1937 Maresyev worked as a turner and then participated in the construction of Komsomolsk-on-Amur.

In 1941, he graduated from the Bataysk Military School of Aviation. He began his flights as a fighter pilot in August 1941. He had shot down four German aircraft by March 1942.

On 5 April 1942 his Yakovlev Yak-1 was shot down near Staraya Russa, after which he was almost captured. Despite being badly injured, he managed to return to the Soviet-controlled territory, braving blizzards and German patrol units. During his 18-day-long journey, his injuries deteriorated so badly that both of his legs had to be amputated above the knee. Before the surgery he was lying on a stretcher with a sheet over his face and considered to be a hopeless case due to the extent of his injuries in addition to suffering from gangrene and blood poisoning. One doctor offered to operate on him and thereby saved him, but told him he would not lose his legs. Upon waking up from anesthesia, he was angered to find that his legs had been amputated above the knee. Desperate to return to his fighter pilot service, he subjected himself to nearly a year of exercise to master the control of his prosthetic devices, and succeeded at that, returning to flying in June 1943.

During a dog fight in August 1943, he shot down three German Focke-Wulf Fw 190 fighters. In total, he completed over 80 combat sorties and shot down an estimated 7 German aircraft. He was awarded the title Hero of the Soviet Union on 24 August 1943. In 1944, he joined the Communist Party and in 1946 he retired from the military.

=== Postwar ===
In 1952, Maresyev graduated from the Higher Party School. In 1956, he obtained a Ph.D. in history and started working in the Soviet War Veterans Committee. Eventually, he became a member of the Supreme Soviet.

He suffered a heart attack on 18 May 2001 and died 16 hours later, just an hour before the celebration of his 85th birthday.

== Remembrance ==
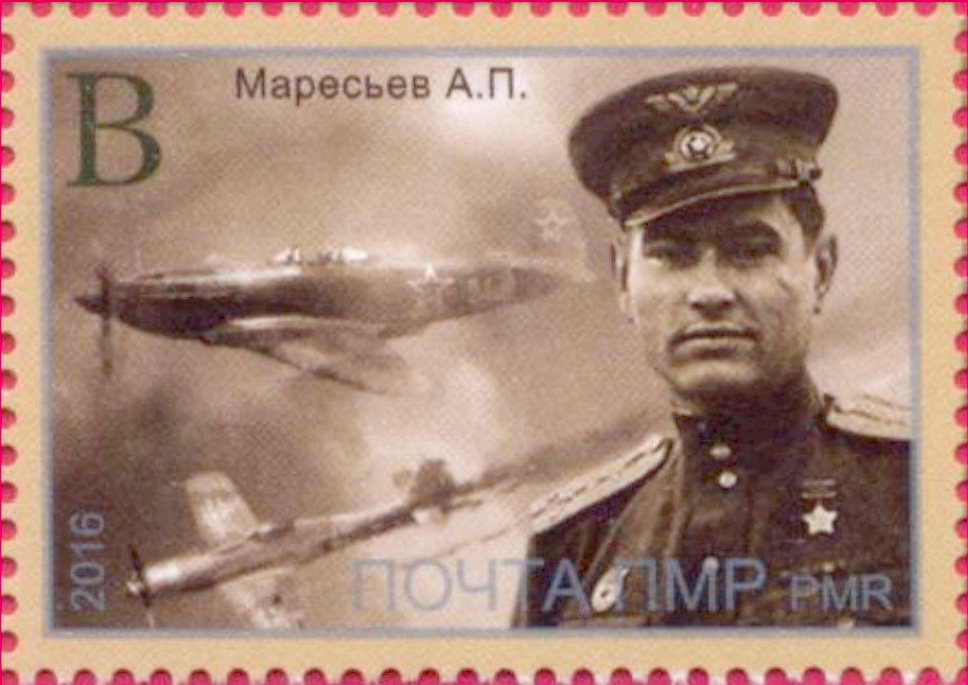
Maresyev on a 2016 stamp of Transnistria

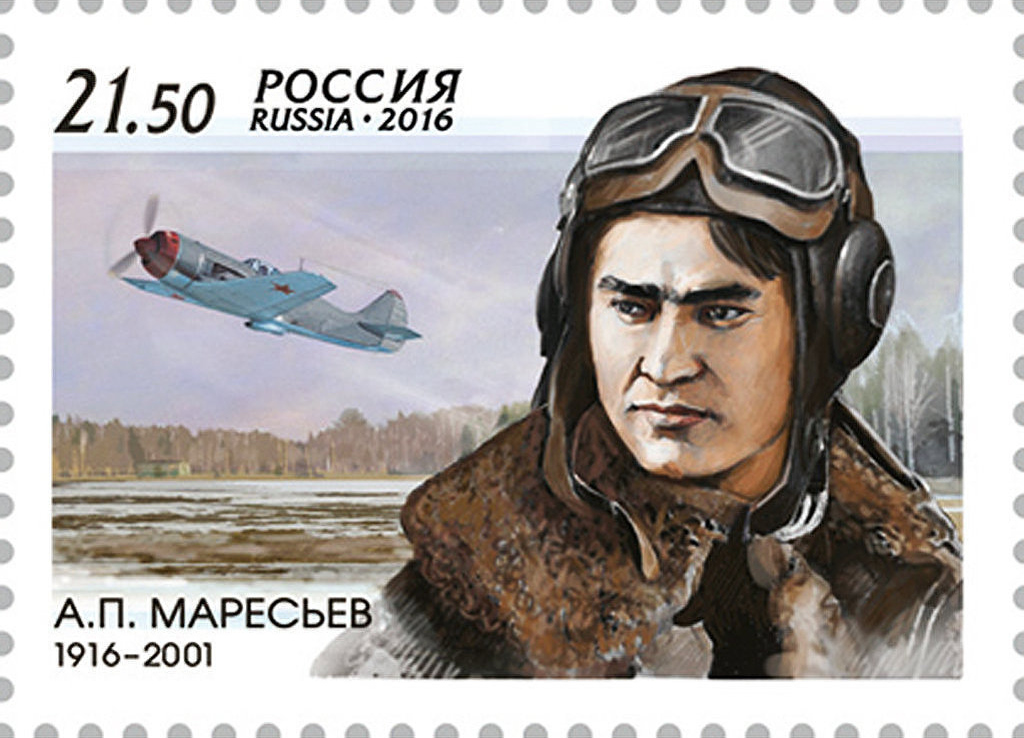
Maresyev on a 2016 Russian stamp

External images
- Maresev before the war
- with prosthetic legs visible
- during physical therapy
- with his wife Galina and son Viktor in 1946
- with Ivan Kozhedub

In 1951, a variety of lilac was named in honor of Maresyev.

His story served as a basis for the novel by Boris Polevoy The Story of a Real Man and a subsequent film (1948) directed by Aleksandr Stolper, in which his name was changed to Meresyev. The novel also inspired Sergei Prokofiev's last opera The Story of a Real Man. In 2005 a documentary called Alexey Maresyev. The Fate of a Real Man was produced by Channel Russia.

In Omon Ra (1992) by Victor Pelevin, a Soviet military academy routinely amputates the legs of its first-year cadets to turn them into "Real Men" like Maresyev.

The Pilot. A Battle for Survival is a 2021 Russian WWII film written and directed by Renat Davletyarov, based on the real story of Maresyev.

The asteroid 2173 Maresjev is named in his honor.

To mark the 105th anniversary of the hero’s birth, the memorial complex “Legendary Maresyev” was unveiled in the town of Bologoye, Tver Region. It includes a replica of a Yak-1 aircraft mounted on a granite pedestal and a bronze figure of the pilot.

== Awards and decorations ==
- Hero of the Soviet Union
- Order "For Merit to the Fatherland", 3rd class
- Two Orders of Lenin
- Order of the Red Banner
- Order of the October Revolution
- Order of the Patriotic War 1st class
- Two Orders of the Red Banner of Labour
- Order of Friendship of Peoples
- Order of the Red Star
- Order of the Badge of Honour
- Medal "For Distinction in Guarding the State Border of the USSR"
- Medal "Veteran of Labour"

== See also ==
- Gheorghe Bănciulescu – a Romanian aviator, the first pilot in the world to fly with his feet amputated
- Douglas Bader – a World War II Royal Air Force fighter pilot with amputated legs
- Zakhar Sorokin – Soviet pilot who flew with both feet amputated
- Ma Ning – a Chinese pilot and Commander of the PLAAF, inspired by the story to fly despite one leg shorter than the other
