= Roman-Gazeta =

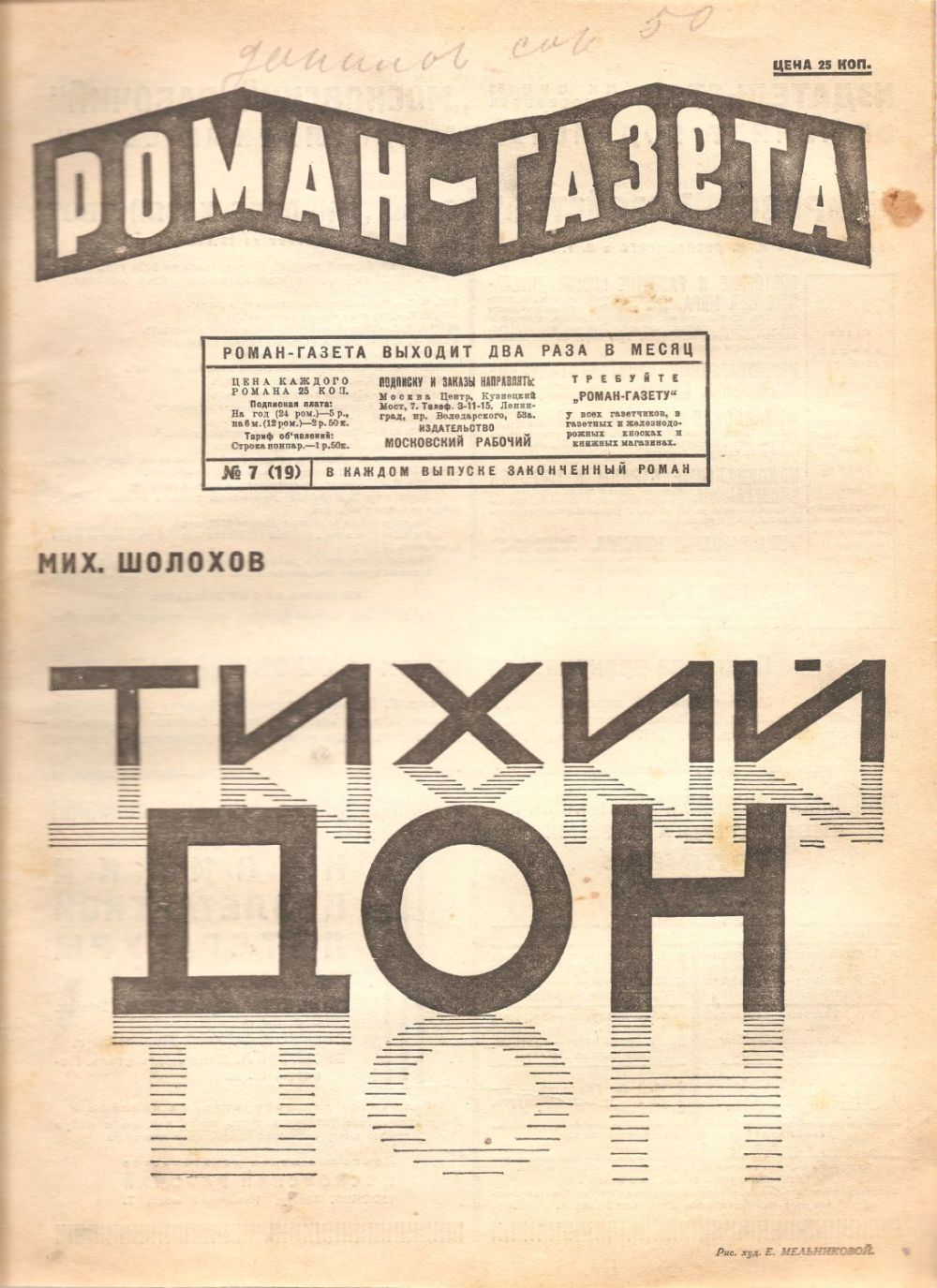
Roman-Gazeta

Roman-Gazeta (Russian: Роман-газета, literally: "Novel-Newspaper") was a special kind of literary magazine in the Soviet Union. The magazine was started in 1927. It was issued irregularly (4 to 24 issues per year, 202 issues in total) from 1927 to 1942, then monthly from 1946 until 1957 when it began to be published twice a month by the "Khudozhestvennaya Literatura" publishing house.

The magazine published mainly new novels (not necessarily the first publication), mostly by Soviet writers, but there were also translations of "ideologically suitable" western writers. It was an inexpensive edition printed on a cheap, brown newspaper paper of size about C4 without illustrations, hence the name.

The magazine published over 1200 novels and short stories by 700 authors and several collections of verses.

The magazine is continued in Russia.
