= Vissarion Shebalin =

Soviet composer (1902–1963)

Vissarion Shebalin

Vissarion Yakovlevich Shebalin (Russian: Виссарион Яковлевич Шебалин; 11 June [O.S. 29 May] 1902 – 29 May 1963) was a Soviet composer and music pedagogue. He was Rector of the Moscow Conservatory (1942-1948) and People's Artist of the RSFSR (1947).

== Biography ==
Shebalin was born in Omsk, where his parents were school teachers. He studied in the musical college in Omsk, and was also enrolled in the Institute of Agriculture. He was 20 years old when, following the advice of his professor, he went to Moscow to show his first compositions to Reinhold Glière and Nikolai Myaskovsky. Both composers thought very highly of his compositions. Shebalin graduated from the Moscow Conservatory in 1928. His diploma work was the 1st Symphony, which the author dedicated to his professor Nikolai Myaskovsky. Many years later his fifth and last symphony was dedicated to Myaskovsky's memory.

In the 1920s Shebalin was a member of the Association for Contemporary Music (ACM); he was a participant of the informal circle of Moscow musicians known as "Lamm's group", which gathered in the apartment of Pavel Lamm, a professor from the Moscow Conservatory.

After graduating from Moscow Conservatory, he worked there as a professor, and in 1935 became also a head of the composition class at the Gnessin State Musical College. In the very difficult years of 1942-48 he was a director of the Moscow Conservatory and the art director of the Central Musical School in Moscow. He fell victim to the Zhdanov purge of artists in 1948 and fell into obscurity afterwards. Among his students were Ester Mägi, Veljo Tormis, Lydia Auster, Edison Denisov, Grigory Frid, Tikhon Khrennikov, Karen Khachaturian, Aleksandra Pakhmutova, Tamara Popatenko, Galina Konstantinovna Smirnova, Asya Sultanova, Yevgania Yosifovna Yakhina, and others. See: List of music students by teacher: R to S#Vissarion Shebalin. Shebalin was one of the founders of and the chairman of the board (1941–1942) of the Union of Soviet Composers.

Shebalin was one of the most cultured and erudite composers of his generation; his serious intellectual style and a certain academic approach to composition make him close to Myaskovsky. In 1951, he was awarded the Stalin Prize. Shebalin was a close friend of Dmitri Shostakovich, who dedicated a string quartet (No. 2) to him.

In 1953, Shebalin suffered a stroke, followed by another stroke in 1959, which impaired most of his language capabilities. Despite that, just a few months before his death from a third stroke in 1963, he completed his fifth symphony, described by Shostakovich as "a brilliant creative work, filled with highest emotions, optimistic and full of life."

Shebalin died on 29 May 1963 in Moscow. He was buried in the Novodevichy Cemetery near his professors and colleagues.

His son Dmitri (1930–2013) was the violist of the Borodin Quartet for 43 years (1953–1996).

== Works ==
Shebalin composed in many musical genres. Among his creations are operas, symphonies, string quartets, trios and sonatas, choral music, romances, songs, music to dramas, radio plays, and film scores. One of the most interesting works of Shebalin is his opera The Taming of the Shrew (Укрощение строптивой, Ukroshcheniye stroptivoy) after William Shakespeare) (1957). He wrote another opera The Sun above the Steppe (Солнце над степью, Solntse nad stepyu) (1958) and also the music comedy The Bridegroom from the Embassy (Жених из посольства, Zhenikh iz posolstva) (1942). He also completed the opera The Fair at Sorochyntsi by Modest Mussorgsky in 1930 and reconstructed a long missing pas de deux from Pyotr Ilyich Tchaikovsky's Swan Lake from a violin 'repetiteur' rediscovered in 1953.

=== Selected compositions (incomplete list) ===
==== Symphonic music ====
- Symphony No. 1 in F minor, Op. 6 (1925)
- Symphony No. 2 in C♯ minor, Op. 11 (1929)
- Dramatic symphony ’Lenin’, Op. 16 for narrator, soloists, choir, and orchestra (1931, rev. 1959)
- Symphony No. 3 in C, Op. 17 (1935)
- Suite No. 1, Op. 18 (1935)
- Suite No. 2, Op. 22 (1935)
- Symphony No. 4 in B♭ major, Op. 24 ‘The Heroes of Perekop’ (1935)
- Sinfonietta on Russian folksongs in A, Op. 43 (1949–1951)
- Symphony No. 5 in C, Op. 56 (1962)
- Suite No. 3, Op. 61 (1963)
- Overtures and film music (listed below with original titles)

==== Concertante ====
- Violin Concerto, Op. 21 (1936–1940)
- Concertino for violin and string orchestra, Op. 14/1 (1932)
- Concertino for horn and orchestra, Op. 14/2 (1930)

==== Chamber works ====
- 9 string quartets (1923–63)
- String Trio, Op. 4 (1924)
- Piano Sonata in E♭ minor, Op. 10
- Sonata for violin and viola, Op. 35 (1944)
- Piano Trio in A, Op. 39 (1946/47)
- Sonata for viola, Op. 51/2 (1954)
- Sonata for violin, Op. 51/1 (1958)
- Sonata for cello, Op. 51/3 (1960)
- Works for guitar
- Four Pieces for Violin and Piano
- Orientalia (three pieces for violin and piano)
- Violin Suite (four pieces for violin and piano)
- Four Light Pieces (for violin and piano)
- Concert Piece (for violin and piano)

==== Film music ====
- 1929 — Турксиб (Documentary)
- 1932 — Дела и люди
- 1933 — Рваные башмаки
- 1937 — Гобсек
- 1937 — Пугачёв
- 1938 — Семиклассники
- 1939 — Социалистическое животноводство (Documentary)
- 1939 — В таёжных далях
- 1941 — Фронтовые подруги
- 1947 — Глинка
- 1947 — Повесть о «Неистовом»
- 1950 — Жуковский
- 1950 — Заговор обречённых
- 1952 — Волки и овцы
- 1952 — Композитор Глинка
- 1952 — Садко
- 1952 — Мастера Малого театра (Documentary)
- 1954 — Ромео и Джульетта
- 1964 — Укрощение строптивой (film performance)

== Selected recordings ==
- Complete a cappella choral cycles Russkaya Conservatoria chamber capella dir. Nikolay Khondzhinsky, Toccata Classics 2011
- Complete String Quartets (Krasni Quartet, issued on Olympia in 3 volumes, 1999–2001. Probably out of print.)
- Symphonies 1–5, Russian Overture, Concertinos Op.14/1 & 2, Sinfonietta Op. 43: issued on Olympia - OCD 577 (1 & 3), OCD 597 (2, 4, & Overture), OCD 599 (5, Concertinos & Sinfonietta)

== Honours and awards ==
- Stalin Prizes:

first class (1943) - for the "Slavic Quartet"
first class (1947) - for the cantata "Moscow"

- Honoured Artist of the RSFSR (1942)
- People's Artist of the RSFSR (1947)
- Order of Lenin (1946)
- Order of the Red Banner of Labour (1944)
