= List of vocal coaches =

This is a list of notable vocal coaches. A vocal coach, also known as voice coach, is a music teacher who instructs singers on how to improve their singing technique, take care of and develop their voice, and prepare for the performance of a song or other work. Vocal coaches may give private music lessons to singers, or they may coach singers who are rehearsing on stage, or who are singing during a recording session.

== B ==
- Jason Barry-Smith
- Yvie Burnett
- Rosemary Butler

== C ==
- Romana Carén
- Gary Catona
- Erana Clark
- Melissa Cross

== D ==
- Nazzareno De Angelis
- Jean Del Val
- Frances Dickinson

== E ==
- Jo Estill

== F ==
- Andrea Figallo
- Kate Firth

== G ==
- Delta Goodrem
- Artemis Gounaki
- Carrie Grant
- David Grant
- Renee Grant-Williams

== H ==
Jean Holden performing in Glendale, California in April 2007

- Jean Holden

== J ==
- Jin Hashimoto
- Floor Jansen

== K ==
- K.Will
- Rasa Kaušiūtė
- Darlene Koldenhoven
- Sonja Kristina

== L ==
- Lilli Lehmann
- Estelle Liebling
- Ray Lyell

== M ==
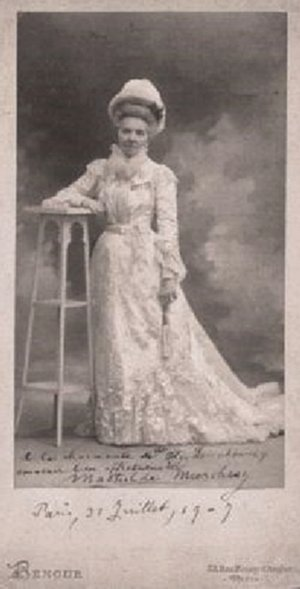
Matilde Marchesi

- Mathilde Marchesi
- John Moriarty (conductor)

== O ==
- Sylvia Olden Lee

== P ==
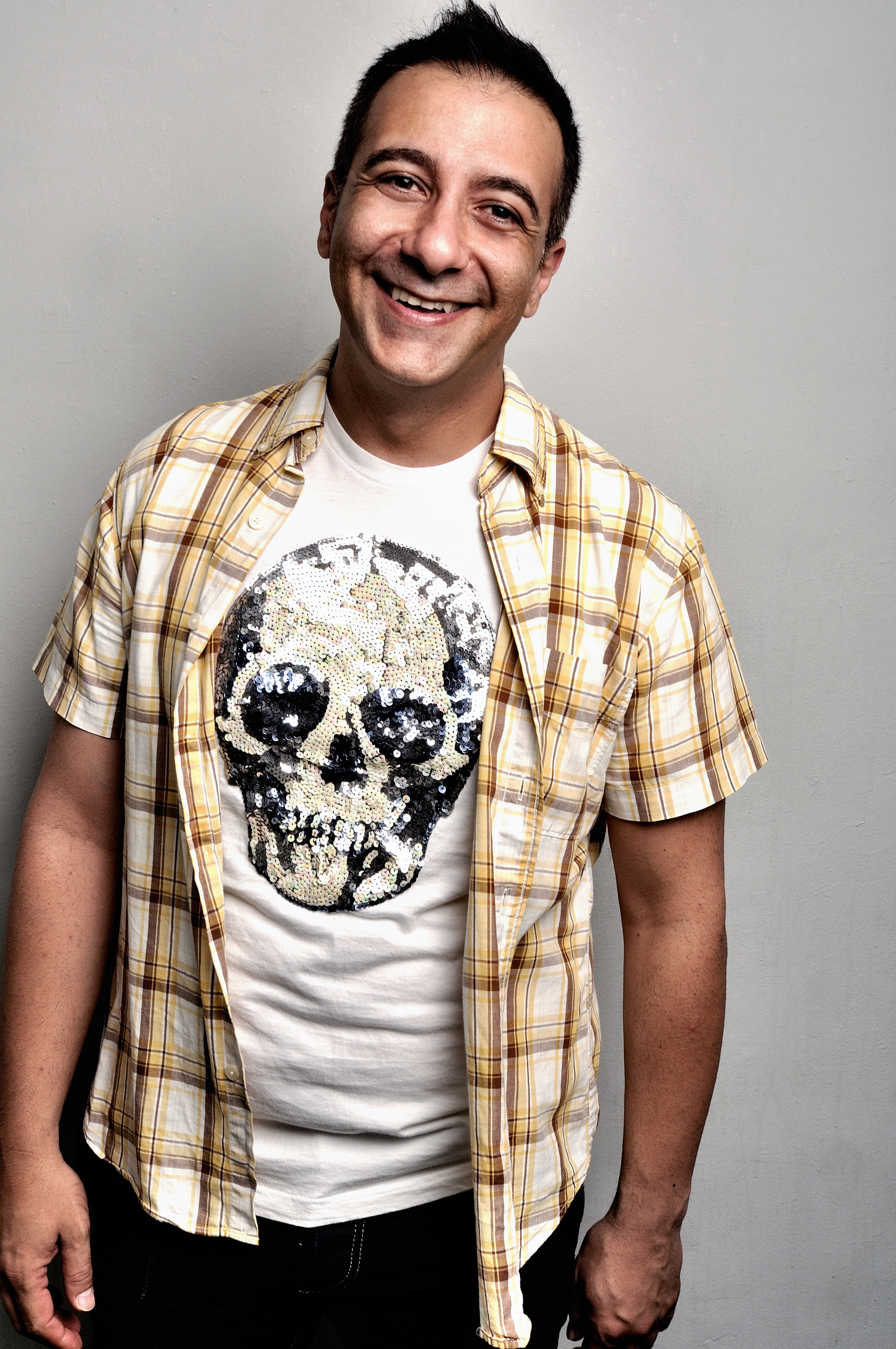
Alexandros Panayi

- Alexandros Panayi
- Miguel Franz Pinto

== R ==
- Luigi Ricci (vocal coach)
- Martin Rich
- Seth Riggs
- Gil Robbins
- Frances Robinson-Duff
- Betty Roe

== S ==
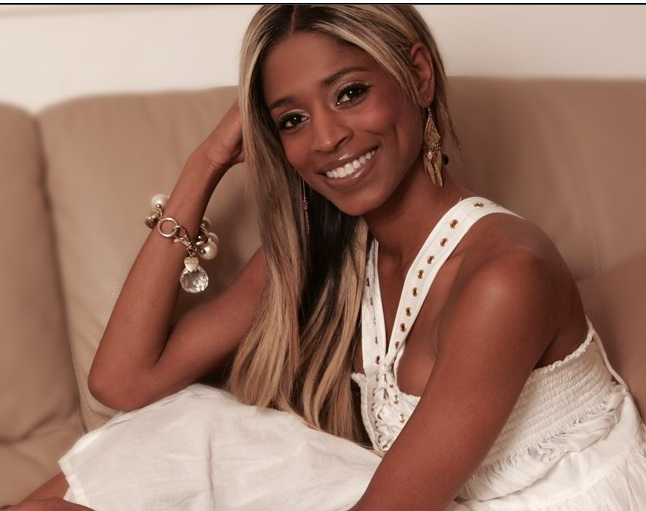
CeCe Sammy

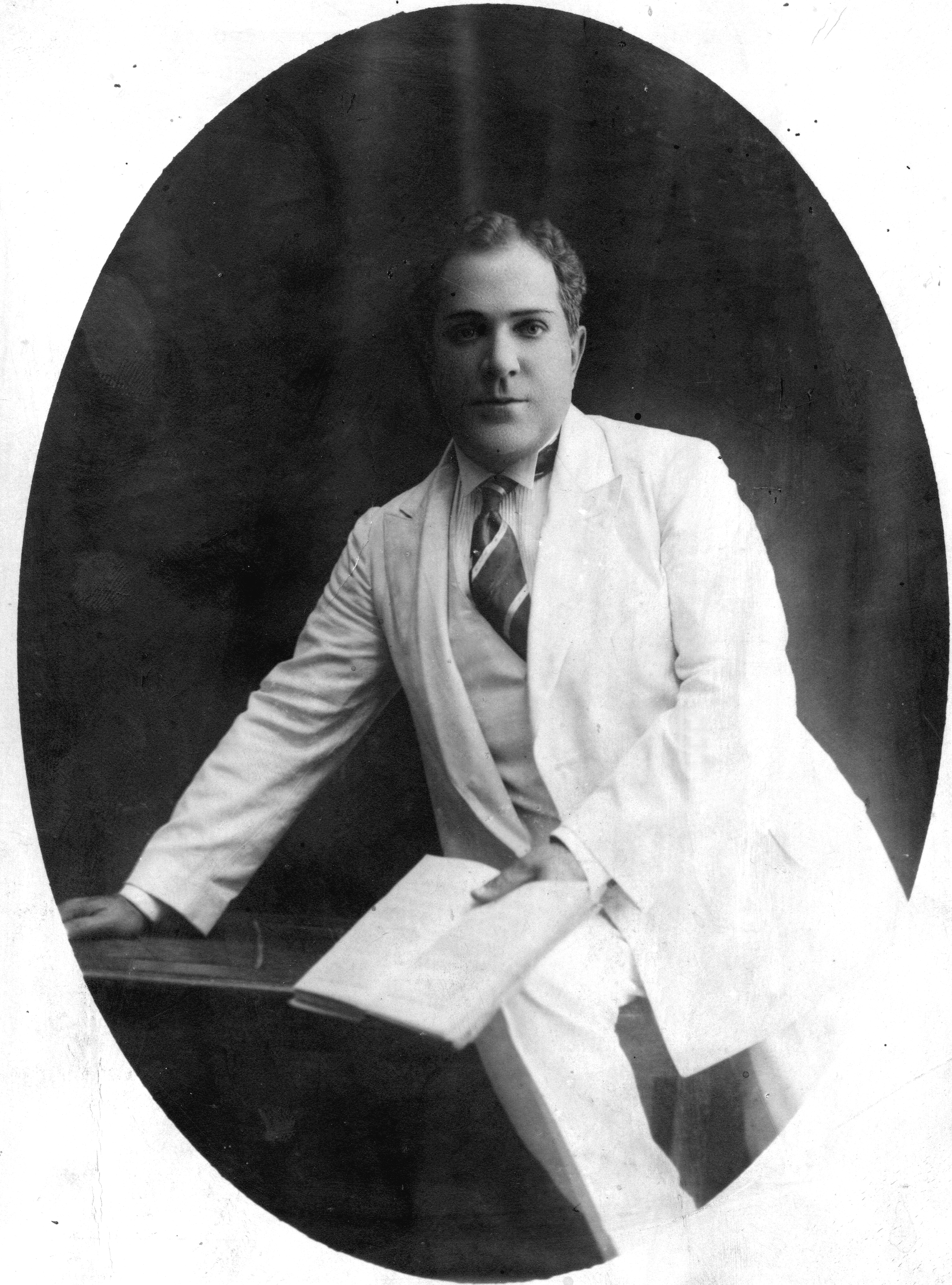
Pyotr Slovtsov

- CeCe Sammy
- Pyotr Slovtsov
- Victor Sokovnin
- Amanda Somerville
- Vibeke Stene

== T ==
- Adeline Toniutti

== U ==
- Paul Ulanowsky

== W ==
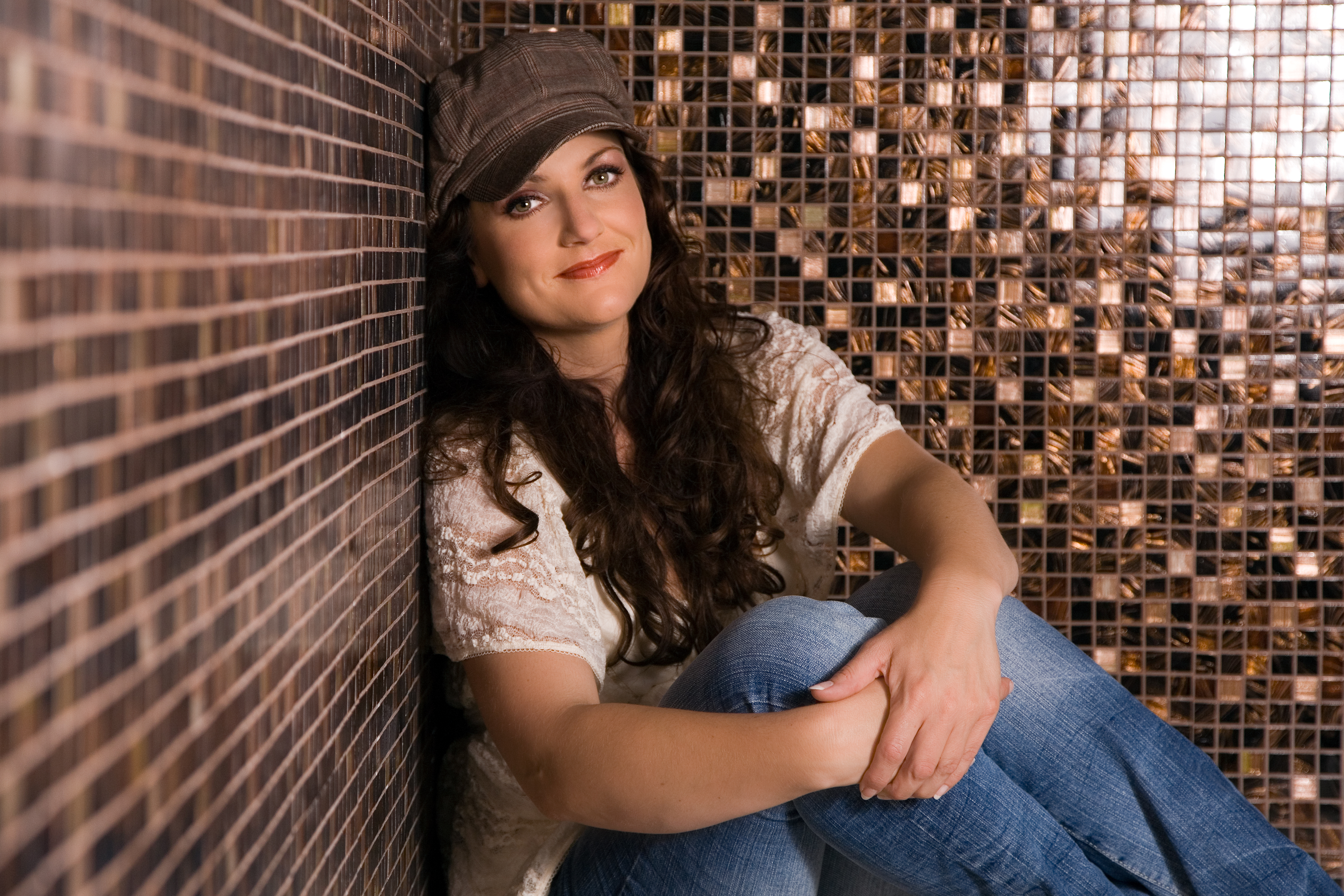
Lana Wolf

- Cornelis Witthoefft
- Lana Wolf

== Z ==
- Mr. Zel

== See also ==
- Music education
