= Sobinov =

Sobinov may refer to one of the following:

- Boris Sobinov (1895–1956), Russian composer
- Leonid Sobinov (1872–1934), Russian opera singer, father of Boris Sobinov
- 4449 Sobinov, an asteroid named after Leonid Sobinov
- Sobíňov, a village in Czech Republic
