= Markson =

Markson is a surname. It is a surname very popular among Jewish (Hebrew: מרקסון). Notable people with the surname include:

- Abram Markson (1888–1938), Russian violinist and conductor
- Ben Markson (1892–1971), American screenwriter
- David Markson (1927–2010), American writer
- Gerhard Markson, German conductor
- Harry Markson (1906–1998), American boxing promoter
- Sharri Markson (born 1984), Australian journalist
