= Pyotr Slovtsov =

Russian opera singer

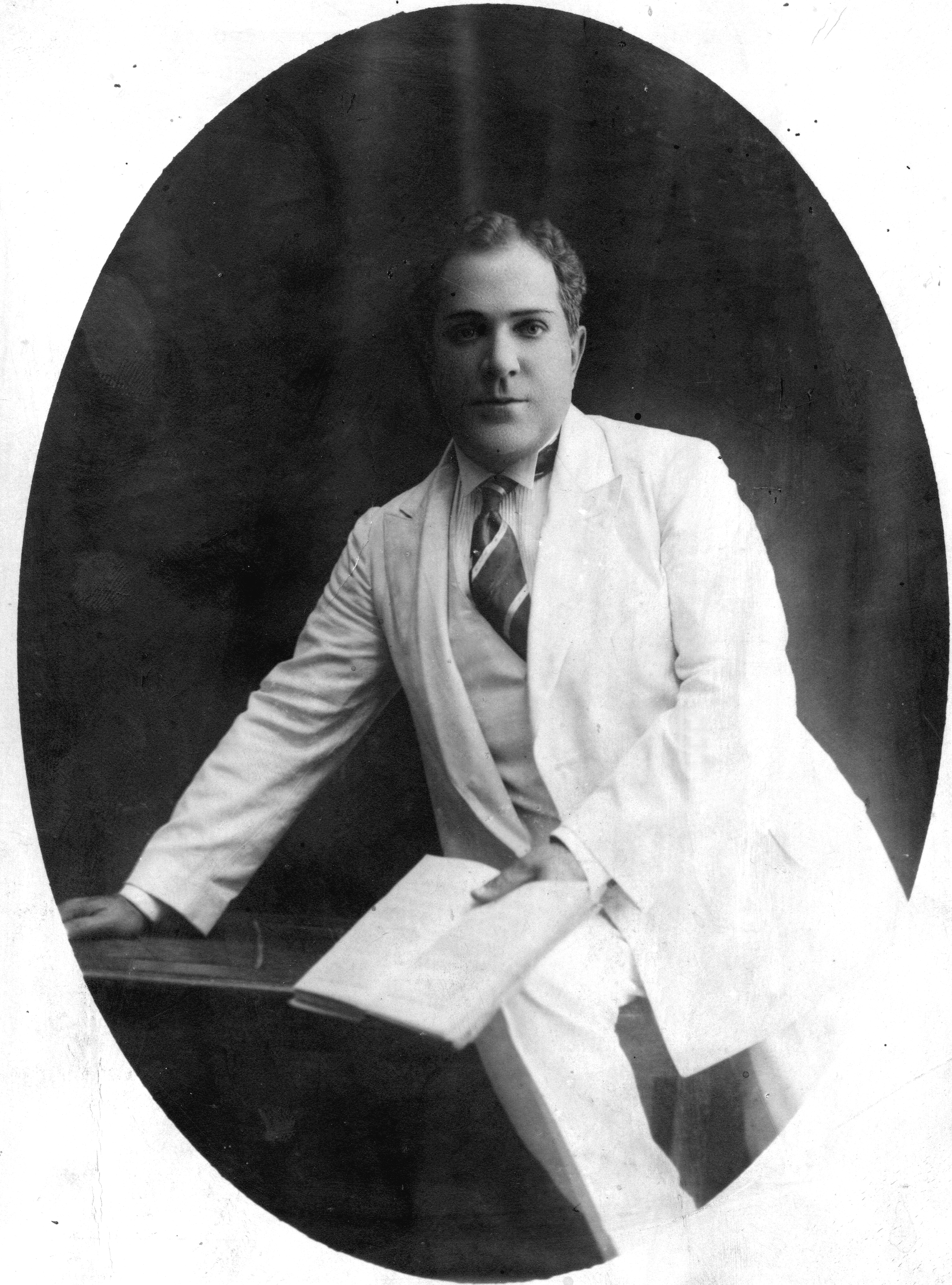
Pyotr Slovtsov

Pyotr Ivanovich Slovtsov (Russian: Пётр Ива́нович Словцо́в; 30 June 1886 – 24 February 1934) was a famous Russian tenor.

== Early years ==
Slovtsov was born in the village of Ustyanskoye in Yeniseysk Governorate of the Russian Empire, to the family of a deacon. His father died when the boy was five, and the mother re-located with Pyotr to Krasnoyarsk. According to family tradition, the boy attended an ecclesiastical school and then a seminary. At the seminary, the boy's discant was noticed by the seminary's choir-master, Pavel Ivanov-Radkevich, who entrusted Pyotr with performing a solo. The local press was impressed with Pyotr's performance to the point of predicting a brilliant career for the boy.

After the graduation, Slovtsov entered the law school of the University of Warsaw, but dropped out only six months later, choosing to attend Moscow Conservatory instead. There he specialized in solo singing under Professor Ivan Gordi. Slovtsov graduated from the Conservatory with its gold medal in 1912.

== Beginning of the career ==
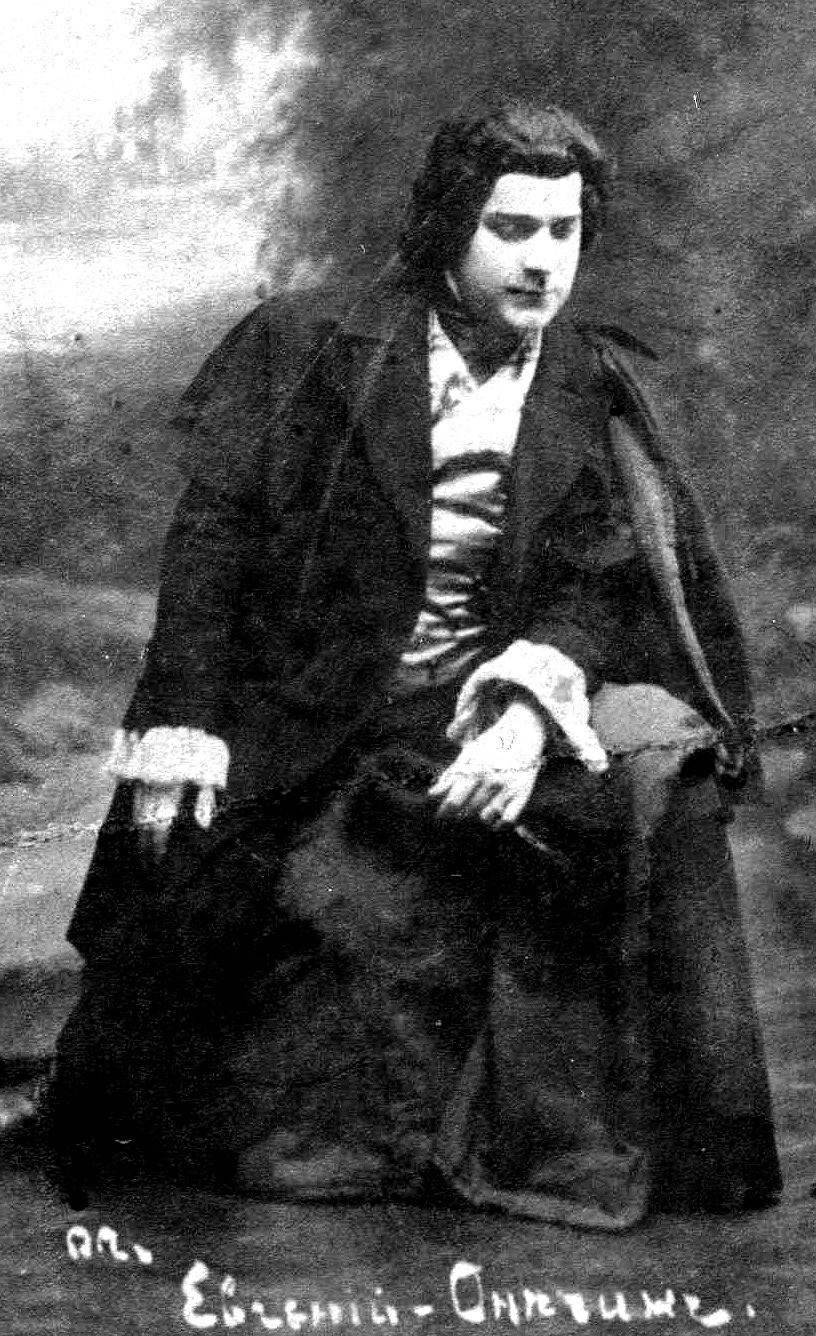
Pyotr Slovtsov in Eugene Onegin

From that time his name appeared on placards in many Russian cities, including Kiev (1912–1914), Saratov (1914), St. Petersburg (1915–1917), Nizhny-Novgorod (1917), Sverdlovsk (1919, 1930), Moscow's Bolshoi Theatre (1929–1932) and Leningrad (end of 1920-beginning 1930).

He made his operatic debut with the Kiev Opera in 1912, and sang there until 1915, when he joined the Petrograd People's House Theatre with a repertoire that included Faust, Rusalka, and Prince Igor. In 1920 he and his wife, the singer M.N Rioli-Slovtsova moved to Krasnoyarsk, although in 1928 he was appointed professor of solo of singing at the Russian Academy of Theatre Arts and continued his appearances the Bolshoi in a wide variety of operatic roles. Slovtsov’s records are extremely rare and sought after by collectors.

Pyotr I. Slovtsov was called by his contemporaries "the Siberian nightingale", and was ranked with such well-known tenors of the day as Vladimir Rosing, A.M. Davydov, Leonid Sobinov, Dmitri Smirnov and Andrey Labinsky.

The singer had an extraordinary rare voice and mastered the high level of skill as drama actor, making him worthy of the traditions of tenor Nikolay Figner, who combined musical, vocal and stage skills in a harmonious performance of opera art.

== Repertoire ==
Notwithstanding the technical imperfections of the recordings he made, one can tell that the voice of Peter Slovtzov was naturally rich and attractive, of mellow timbre, clear and unique in its strength yet velvet sounding. Feodor Chaliapin highly appreciated his talent, and they sang together in the operas Prince Igor, Rusalka, Faust, Mozart and Salieri and The Barber of Seville. For long years the bosom friendship connected Slovtzov with well-known masters of drama as Leonid Sobinov, Nadezhda Obukhova, Vasili Kachalov and Antonina Nezhdanova. Many newspapers and journals at that time highly appreciated Slovtzov's talent: "Slovtzov has a wonderful school. His voice, though of mellow timbre, impeccably obeys to its master." His best roles included Vladimir Igorevich (Prince Igor, Alexander Borodin), the Prince (Rusalka, Alexander Dargomyzhsky ), Vladimir Dubrovsky (Dubrovsky, Eduard Nápravník), the Indian visitor (Sadko, Nikolai Rimsky-Korsakov), Tsar Berendey (The Snow Maiden, Rimsky-Korsakov), Mozart (Mozart and Salieri, Rimsky-Korsakov), Lensky (Eugene Onegin, Pyotr Tchaikovsky, in 1915), Count Almaviva (The Barber of Seville, Gioachino Rossini), Alfred (La traviata, Giuseppe Verdi), Faust (Faust, Charles Gounod), Romeo (Romeo et Juliette, Gounod), Nadir (The Pearl Fishers, Georges Bizet), Dzherald (Lakmé, Leo Delibes).

Other roles he sang included Vasya (The Power of the Fiend, Alexander Serov); the Duke (Rigoletto, Giuseppe Verdi) and Lohengrin (Lohengrin Richard Wagner).

Partners on stage included A. M. Bragin, R. G. Gorskaja, L. Lipkovskaja, V. Sokovnin, Antonina Nezhdanova(in Bolshoi Theatre, in Traviata by Verdi, 1928), V. K. Pavlovskaya and M. O. Reizen (in Rusalka), Feodor Chaliapin (in operas Rusalka, Prince Igor, Mozart and Salieri, Faust, The Barber of Seville; the singer presented to Slovtsov a photo dated 31 December 1915 with an inscription: "With kind memories and warm wishes for success in the art world"). Conductors Slovtsov sang under included Mark Golinkin (1875–1963), Abram Markson, Ariy Pazovsky, etc.

== Career as director and teacher ==
Slovtsov was also a talented director and a vocal coach. He was not tall, a bit plump with an open Russian face. He attracted people with his simple-heartedness. Organizing abilities helped Slovtsov to unite talented people around him. In Krasnoyarsk (Siberia) he organized the vocal school for the People’s Conservatory, Worker’s Opera and society "Music for the Masses". He staged 14 operas in Krasnoyarsk. In 1928 Slovtsov was invited by professor of solo singing in Russian Academy of Theatre Arts. During 22 years of his creative activity Slovtsov gave two thousand concerts.

== Marriage ==
His wife, Margarita N. Rioly, was a lyrico-dramatic soprano and also an opera singer. She had studied solo singing at the Moscow Conservatory under V.M. Zarudnaya-Ivanova, and graduated a year earlier than Slovtzov. Rioly was not only a talented singer, but also a remarkable teacher of singing. But most of all she loved the opera stage and performed leading roles on opera stages of Tiflis, Kharkov (1913), Ekaterinburg (1915–1916), Petrograd (Narodny Dom), Tomsk, Irkutsk and Krasnoyarsk. In 1915 M. Rioly married P.I. Slovtzov and from that time they cooperated in concert activity and performed together on opera stages. Margarita N. Rioly was also an excellent pianist, so became Slovtzov’s favourite accompanist.

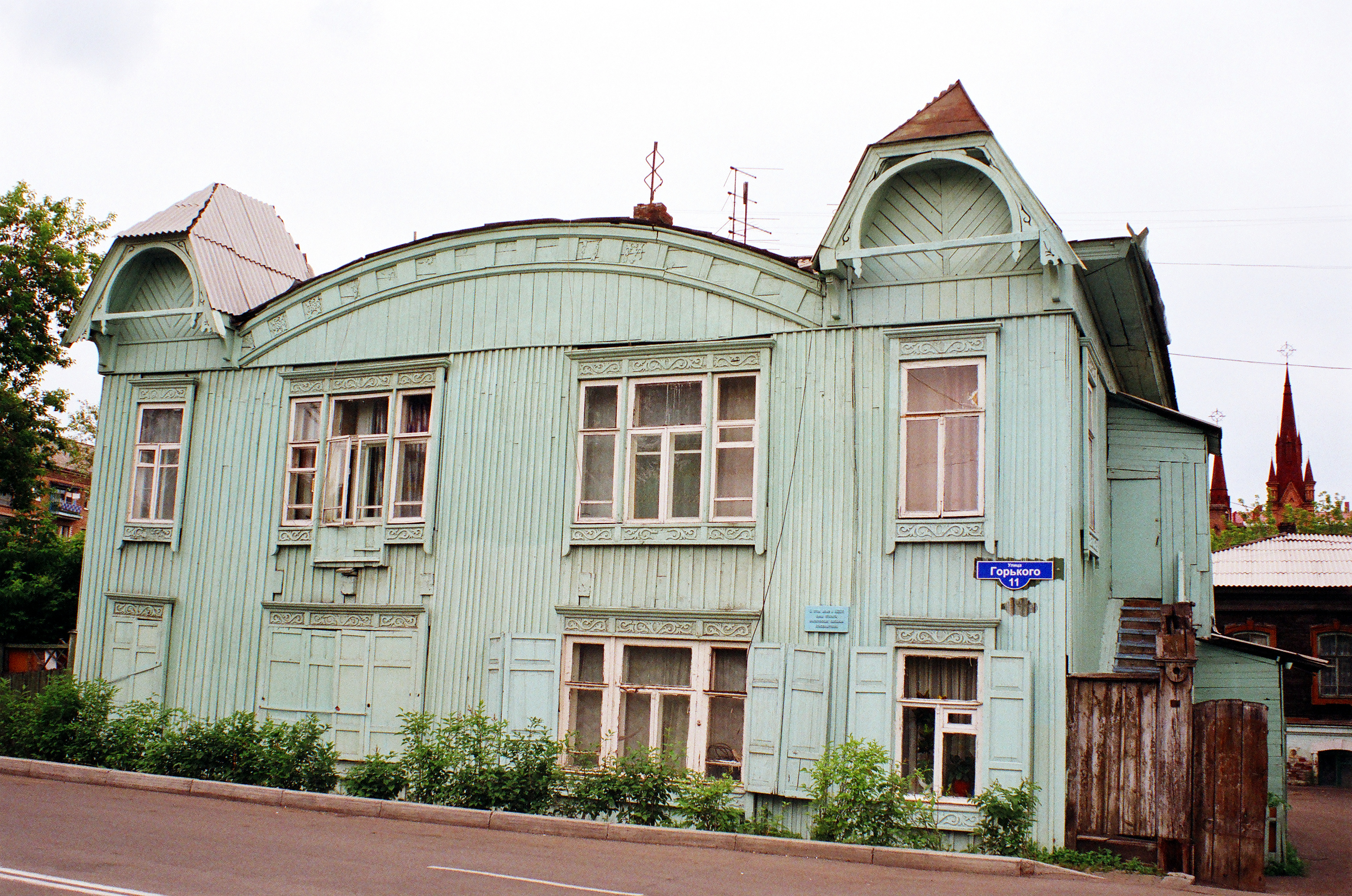
11 Gorky St. Where the National Conservatory was in 1920

In 1934, Slovtsov caught cold while performing on his tour in one of the city of Soviet Union and soon died. His monument of white marble is located in Pokrovsky cemetery in Krasnoyarsk. The words engraved on the monument are from opera Werther: "Why awaken me, O breath of Spring?". Margarita Nikolaevna Rioli-Slovtsova continued teaching for another twenty years in Krasnoyarsk. Among the students of Margarita Nikolaevna - E. K. Iofel, who later became a professor and teacher and Dmitry Hvorostovsky - the world famous baritone.

== Memorial events ==
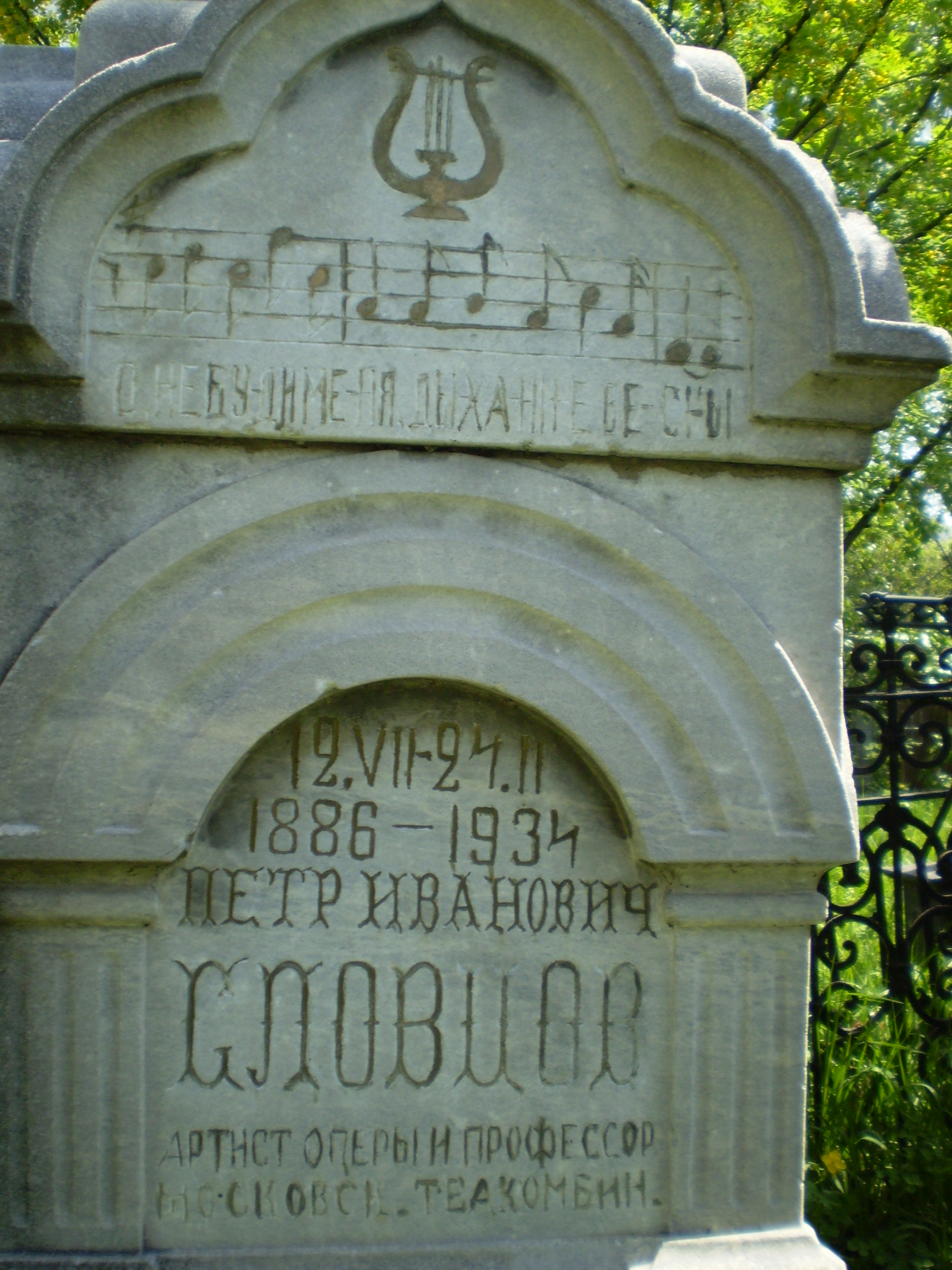
Monument on a tomb of P. I. Slovtsov on Troitsk a cemetery of Krasnoyarsk.

To mark the 120th anniversary of his birth, The Central Museum of Musical Culture by M.I. Glinka published a CD of 26 songs and arias recorded by Slovtsov before 1917. This CD was presented in the 42nd Exhibition MIDEM, 2008 in Cannes. That same year broadcasts about the tenor were made by National radio, RtV-Podmoskovie, Radio Rossii and Radio Maria; and in the USA, Marston Records released a CD "Pyotr Ivanovich Slovtsov. The Russian tenor" mastered by the Grammy Award-winning engineer Ward Marston. On 10 October 2010 Radio Rossii made a 44-minute broadcast about Slovtsov.

From February till April 2011 in Krasnoyarsk has passed festival "Parade of stars in opera", devoted to the 125 anniversary from the date of a birth of the singer.

== Sources ==
- (in Russian) Broadcast about Slovtsov
- The list of the disks which have been let out by a sound department of the Glinka state central museum of musical culture. Moscow 2007. P. 3. Disk "Peter Slovtzov-the Siberian nightingale"
- (in Russian)Aron Proujanski. Native singer. 1750—1917: Dictionary. — Pub. 2nd . — Moscow, 2008.
- (in Russian) Sergey Rychkov, "Сибирский соловей – тенор Пётр Словцов" (The Siberian Nightingale - Tenor Pyotr Slovtsov), Ямальский меридиан, 1 (265), 2010, pp. 76–81
- Marston Records, Liner Notes: Pyotr Ivanovich Slovtsov: Russian Tenor.USA.
- Note by Alan Bilgora. Treasures of the St. Petersburg State Museum
- Mariya Kurenko and Pyotr Slovtsov. La traviata. The duet of Violetta Valéry and Alfredo Germont. 1913.
- Vladimir's aria. Op. "Dubrovsky", record of 1929 accompanied by orchestra of the Bolshoi theatre
