= Mikhail Mikhailovich Ivanov =

Mikhail Mikhailovich Ivanov may refer to:

- Mikhail Ippolitov-Ivanov (Mikhail Mikhailovich Ippolitov-Ivanov, 1859–1935), Russian composer and conductor
- Mikhail Ivanov (composer) (Mikhail Mikhaylovich Ivanov, 1849–1927), Russian composer
