= Cooper Phillip (singer) =

- Born: July 20, 1989 (age 37); Saratov, Russia
- Occupations: Vocal coach, recording artist, vocal producer, singer, and songwriter
- Website: https://www.cooperphillipmusic.com/

Cooper Phillip is a Russian-American singer, songwriter, vocal coach, recording artist, and vocal producer.

== Early life and education ==
Cooper Phillip was born July 20, 1989, in Saratov, Russia, into a family of classical musicians. Her mother, a professional violinist, toured internationally, and Phillip spent much of her early childhood being raised by her grandmother and aunt. At the age of 12, she reunited with her mother and began formal music education in Moscow, where she studied classical piano, harp, ballet, and voice. She later pursued higher education in jazz vocal performance and vocal pedagogy.

== Career ==
At the age of 19, Cooper Phillip moved to New York City to pursue a music career, performing at weddings and clubs while working various service jobs to support herself. She later relocated to Los Angeles, where she released her debut EP titled Walk a Mile, which features tracks such as "Black Box," "Tough Love," and her first single, "Silence." In January 2024, she released the downtempo R&B single "She's A Player," which is characterized as a reflection on independence and self-worth.

In 2008, Cooper began developing Biophonics, a vocal training method that emphasizes breathing techniques, vocal agility exercises, and body alignment practices.

In 2025, Cooper collaborated with record producer Walter Afanasieff to co-write the song "One Sweet December Night."

== Discography ==
=== Extended Plays ===
Year	Extended Plays
2016	Walk a Mile

=== Singles ===
Year	Singles
2014	Silence
2016	Party by Myself
2020	Not Perfect
2021	Boomerang
2021	Perfectly Original
2021	Head Over Heels
2022	Masterpiece
2023	The Answers (featuring Durand Bernarr)
2024	She's A Player
2024	One Sweet December Night
2024	One Sweet December Night (Remix by SarkeS)
2025	Last One
