= Slovtsov =

Slovtsov may refer to:

- Pyotr Slovtsov (1886–1934), Russian tenor
- 7453 Slovtsov, an asteroid discovered in 1978
