= Alexander Dodonov =

Russian opera singer (1837–1914)

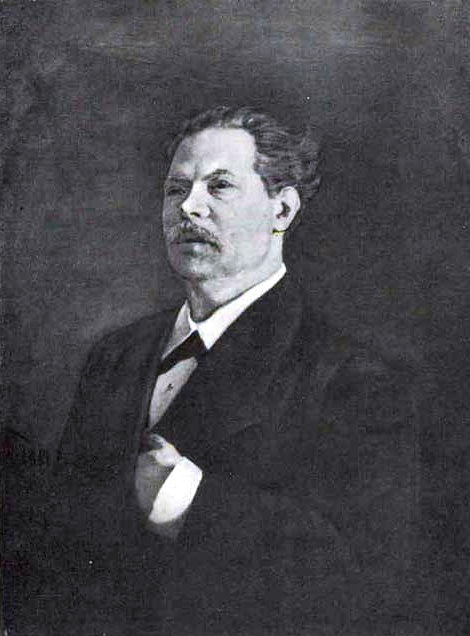
- Born: February 24, 1837; St Petersburg, Russian Empire
- Died: February 1, 1914 (aged 76); Moscow, Russian Empire
- Occupation: Operatic singer

Alexander Mikhailovich Dodonov (Russian: Александр Михайлович Додонов, February 24, [OS 12] 1837 — February 1 [OS January 19], 1914) was a Russian opera singer. Vocally, he is best described as a lyric or spinto (lyric dramatic) tenor.

He was born in St Petersburg, and was a pupil of Felice Ronconi, Manuel Patricio Rodríguez García (son) and Francesco Lamperti. He sang for two years at the Italian operatic scenes in (Milan and Naples), then in Odessa and Kiev. He was a soloist at the Moscow Bolshoi Theatre from 1869 to 1891.

He sang the role of the Schoolmaster (Школьный учитель) at the premiere of Peter Tchaikovsky's opera Cherevichki in Moscow, at the Bolshoi Theatre on January 31 [OS January 19] 1887, which was conducted by Pyotr Tchaikovsky.

== Teaching and writing ==
He became a professor of the Moscow College of Music and Drama. Among his pupils were Leonid Sobinov and Dmitri Smirnov. He published his "Руководство к правильной постановке голоса и изучению искусства пения" (“The Guidance to the correct setting of voice and learning of skill of singing”) in 1891. He died in Moscow.
