= The Vestal =

1888 ballet by Marius Petipa

La Vestale
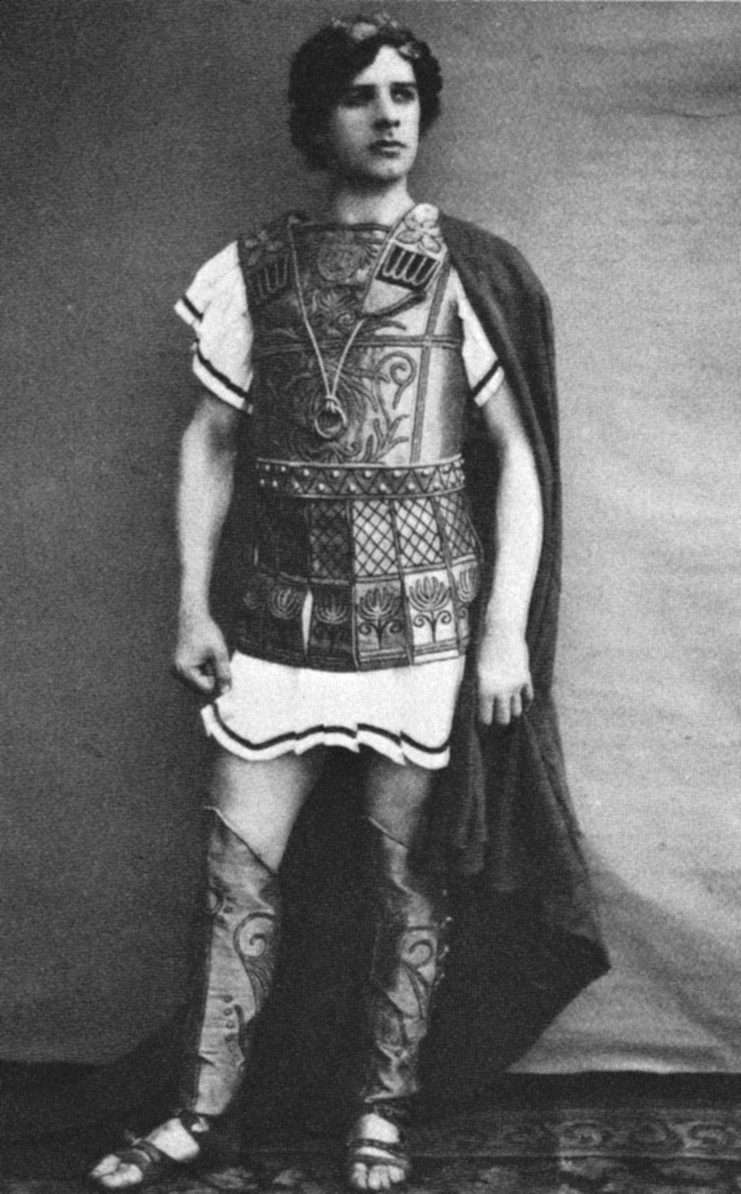
- Mikhail Mordkin as Lucio ca. 1900
- Choreographer: Marius Petipa
- Music: Mikhail Ivanov
- Libretto: Sergei Khudekov
- Premiere: 17 February [O.S. 5 February] 1888 (Imperial Mariinsky Theatre); St. Petersburg, Russia
- Genre: Grand ballet

La Vestale (en. The Vestal) is a grand ballet in three acts and four scenes with choreography by Marius Petipa and music by Mikhail Ivanov. The ballet was first presented by the Imperial Ballet on 17 February [O.S. 5 February] 1888 at the Imperial Mariinsky Theatre in St. Petersburg, Russia.

== History ==
After the extraordinary success of the Italian Prima Ballerina Virginia Zucchi's performances in La Esmeralda in St Petersburg, Petipa went on to produce some of the finest ballets in his repertoire for Italian ballerinas. One of these great ballets was The Vestal, which was created for the benefit performance of Elena Cornalba. The ballet was a phenomenal success and among ballet historians, it is considered the predecessor of The Sleeping Beauty. Many critics who saw the première commented unanimously that the work was the epitome of the Ballet à Grand Spectacle. Set in Ancient Rome, the ballet was built on fantastical themes, complete with gods and goddesses, Emperors, and the like. The sets, costumes, and props were considered the best yet seen on the Imperial stage. Mikhail Ivanov's music proved to be the first successful score for the ballet that was provided by a symphonic composer.

Although the ballet was not notated and is not performed today, at least two variations from the ballet's score are used in different pieces. One variation is that entitled L'Armour, which was composed and added to the score by Riccardo Drigo as a variation for Cupid, the God of Love. This variation was performed with great acclaim by the ballerina, Maria Anderson and appears in the Bolshoi Ballet's staging of the Paquita Grand Pas Classique, staged by Russian choreographer, Yuri Burlaka. Burlaka also utilised another supplemental variation by Drigo for his Awakening of Flora Pas de quatre; this variation is entitled L'Echo and was composed and added to the score by Drigo for Elena Cornalba.

== Roles and original cast ==
Role	Dancer
Amata	Elena Cornalba
Lucio	Pavel Gerdt
Claudia	Maria Gorshenkova
Senator Julius Flac	Felix Kschessinsky
The High Priest	Nikolai Aistov
Lelia	Anna Johansson
