= Jean Holden =

American singer

- Holden-Hanna at Murphy's in 2009

Background information
- Born: Norris Jean Ashley; February 2, 1940; Masonville, Arkansas, U.S.
- Genres: Contemporary jazz
- Occupations: Singer, vocal coach
- Instrument: Vocals
- Years active: 1962–present

Jean Holden (born February 2, 1940, in Masonville, Arkansas) is an American contemporary jazz singer and vocal coach, who has been called Toledo's First Lady of Song.
