= Abram Markson =

Abram Leontievich Markson
- Абрам Леонтьевич Марксон
- Born: 1888; Krasnoyarsk
- Died: 1938 (aged 49–50); Krasnoyarsk
- Education: Tomsk musical school, two courses of the Petersburg conservatory
- Occupations: Violinist, conductor

Abram Leontievich Markson (Russian: Абрам Леонтьевич Марксон; 1888–1938) was a Russian and Soviet violinist and conductor. He was of Jewish origin.

== Biography ==
Abram Leontievich Markson was born in a family of dealers in Krasnoyarsk. He finished Tomsk musical school at Jacob Medlina and two courses of the Petersburg conservatory (family circumstances prevented him from graduating). In 1912, he actively gave concerts in Krasnoyarsk as the violinist, having in repertoire masterly products Sarasate Pablo, Venjavsky, K. Sen-Sans, and in 1914 supervised an orchestra of city theatre. In 1919, Kolchak was mobilised in and served as the conductor of an orchestra of the 31st Siberian shooting regiment of the 8th Siberian shooting division. Since 1920, pedagogical activity of Markson in National conservatory, then began musical technical school. Simultaneously he continued concert activity in Krasnoyarsk and other cities of Siberia as the soloist and as a part of chamber ensembles. One of the first symphonic orchestras popular in public in Russia beyond Ural Mountains in 1920th years-was an orchestra under control of A.L. Markson who gave concerts on gardens open-air stage, recreation centres and city theatre. The orchestra under control of Markson had executed popular performances of an opera Traviata, "Rigoletto", "Faust", "Mermaid", "Eugenie Onegin" and others, not established while documentary. The means obtained from concerts went to various funds: Krasnyj the Cross, "Dirizhablestroenie", «Our answer of Chemberlen», «the Help to homeless children», Zapovednik "Columns", «the Help Artist| burnt down Irkutsk, "For the aid to proletariat of Japan». Together with Slovtsov, V. Sokovnin and the chorus master W. V.Abajantsevym, Markson was the founder in 1928 of a philharmonic society «Music to weights". Any musical action of a city did not do without Abram Leontevicha's participation and its orchestras. A.L. Markson has brought up known violinists in Krasnoyarsk: Anatoly Arapov, Vadim and Nikolay Bujanov, Stanislav Pudul and Gennady Nazarov.

== Sentencing and rehabilitation ==
In February 1938, nine musicians of an orchestra were accused of the White Guard plot and arrested. On 21 February 1938 Abram Markson, after arrest, was condemned six days NKVD under 58th article and sentenced to execution. The sentence was carried out on 26 February 1938 in Krasnoyarsk. As a result of reprisals concerning musicians translation of musical programs for some time in Krasnoyarsk a Radio committee has stopped. A.L. Markson was rehabilitated on 15 May 1956 by the military court of the Siberian military district in the absence of crime structure.

== Sources ==
- E.V. Prigun. Formation and development of music education in Krasnoyarsk from its origins to the early 20th century: Doctor of Arts Thesis. Novosibirsk: Novosibirsk State Conservatory (Academy) Glinka, 2008. (Chapter IV. Music and art life and music education in Krasnoyarsk in the period from 1895 to the early 20th century)](in Russian)
- (in Russian)M. G. Volkova. Requiem for a spiritual gene pool
