= Olimpia Boronat =

Italian opera singer

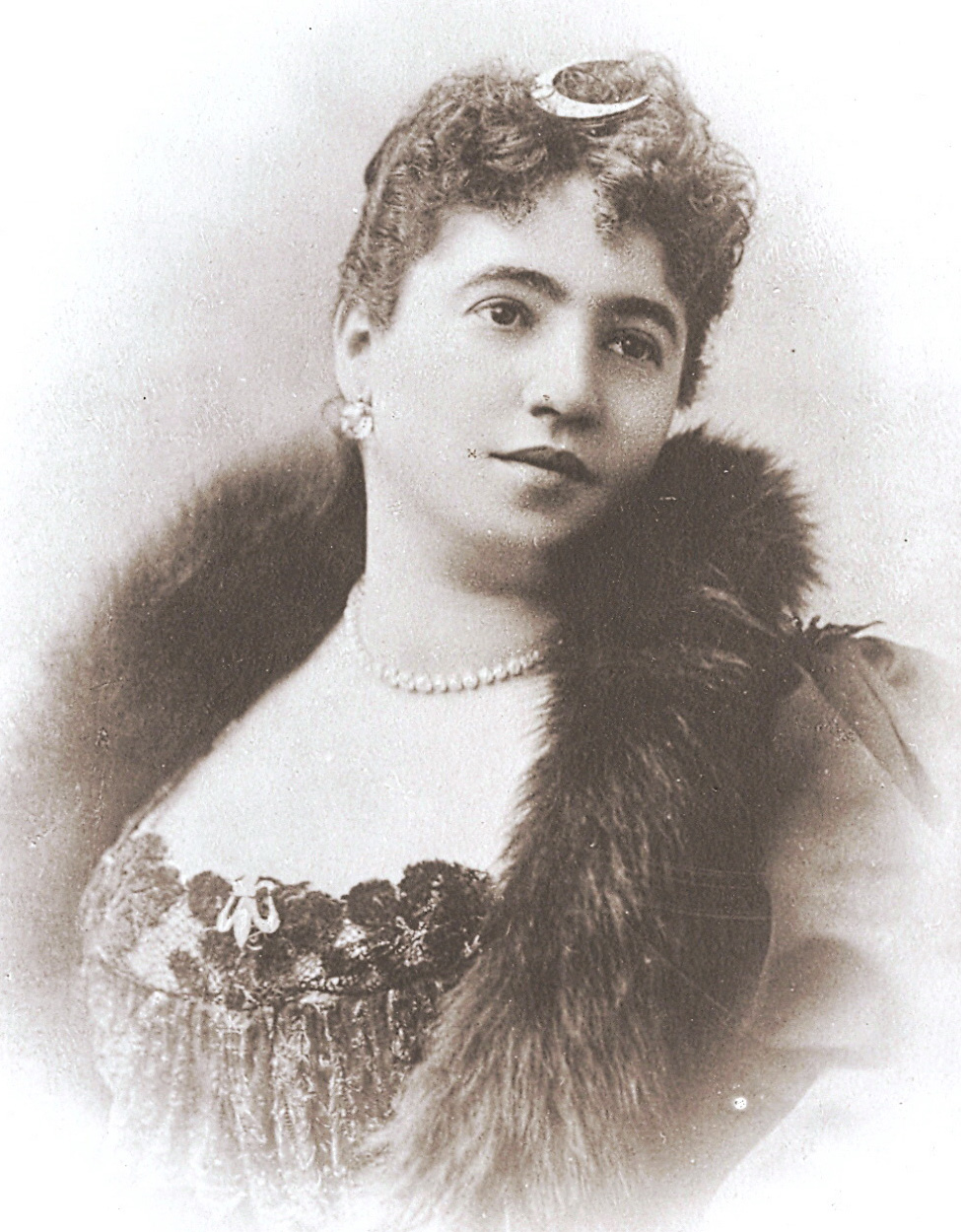
Olimpia Boronat

Olimpia Boronat (March 25, 1867 – October 24, 1933) was an Italian operatic lyric coloratura soprano, noted for her performances of the soprano roles in the bel canto repertory.

== Biography ==
Olimpia Boronat was born in Genoa on March 25, 1867. Her father was an Italian officer and her mother was of Spanish origin. She studied with Franco Leoni in Milan. She made her debut at the Teatro Bellini, Naples in 1886 after which she toured South and Central America. She was active in Italian provincial theaters, and performed at the Teatro di San Carlo in Naples, the Teatro Manzoni in Milan, the Teatro Politeama, Palermo, and the Teatro Adriano in Rome. She was engaged at the Imperial Opera in St Petersburg from 1890 to 1893. She was a great success in Russia.

Boronat married the Polish Count Rzewuski. Grove Music Online (GML) states she married in 1893 and then left the stage until resuming her career in 1901. The Grosses Sängerlexikon (GSL) states she married in 1902 and did not resume working until 1905. According to GML she was active on the Russian and Polish stage from 1901 to 1914. GSL states that she appeared in St. Petersburg, Moscow, Kiev and Warsaw from the 1905 period on, and was again in Italy in 1909. Both sources agree she retired from the stage in 1914, and the GSL add that she established a singing school in Warsaw at this time.

Boronat was noted for a voice of great beauty and clarity, and exceptional technical ability, coupled with sensitive musicianship. She was particularly associated with the roles of Rosina in The Barber of Seville, Violetta in La traviata, Elvira in I puritani, and Ophélie in Hamlet. The GSL notes that she is sometimes confused with her sister, Elena Boronat, who also had a career on the opera stage.

Boronat died in Varsovie on October 24, 1933.

== Recordings ==
Boronat's complete recordings, dating from 1904 and 1908, were released by Marston Records in 1997. These include works by Alexander Alyabyev, Bellini, Bizet, Donizetti, Flotow, Pietro Giannelli, Gounod, Mikhail Ivanov, Meyerbeer, Tosti, Verdi, and Redento Zardo.
