= Miguel Franz Pinto =

American vocal coach and conductor

Miguel Franz Pinto (August 25, 1940, Sagua La Grande, Cuba — September 30, 2006, Cedar Falls, Iowa) was a Cuban American vocal coach, conductor, and pianist. He studied piano at the Juilliard School of Music in New York City under Adele Marcus, earning both a Bachelor of Arts and Master of Science degrees. From 1975 to 1977 he served as the assistant conductor of the New York Philharmonic under Leonard Bernstein, also working as the orchestra's primary vocal coach. He later became the head vocal coach of the Festival de Ópera de Las Palmas in Spain from 1980 to 1982 and later the Teatro dell'Opera di Roma summer festival in the late 1990s. Pinto also worked as an accompanist and vocal coach with the Opera Australia and the Canadian Opera Company and was a frequent juror for the Enrico Caruso International Vocal Competition at Carnegie Hall. He also worked as a vocal coach and accompanist for many important singers, including Michael Cousins, Eric Cutler, Gilda Cruz-Romo, Alfedo Kraus, Joan Sutherland, Anna Moffo, Carlos Montane, Licia Albanese, and Florence Quivar. In 1991 he became a member of the voice faculty at the University of Northern Iowa, where he taught until his death. Pinto died in his home in Cedar Falls of accidental carbon monoxide poisoning in 2006 at the age of 66.
