= Mikhail Ivanov (composer) =

Russian composer, critic and writer on music (1849–1927)

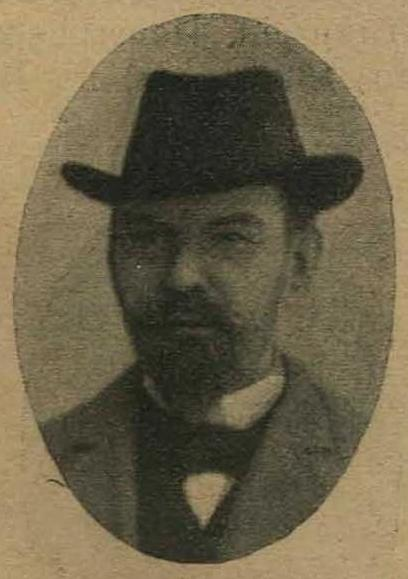
Mikhail Ivanov

Mikhail Mikhaylovich Ivanov (Russian: Михаи́л Миха́йлович Ива́нов; 23 September 1849 – 20 October 1927) was a Russian composer, critic and writer of music.

== Biography ==
Mikhail Mikhaylovich Ivanov was born in Moscow in 1849. He studied at the Technological Institute, Saint Petersburg, then at the Moscow Conservatory for a year, under Pyotr Ilyich Tchaikovsky (harmony) and Alexandre Dubuque (piano). He lived the next six years of his life in Rome, where he associated with Franz Liszt and his pupils and studied with Giovanni Sgambati. He returned to Russia and became a music critic with the Novoye Vremya.

Many of his compositions were performed, but not published. Arias from his opera Zabava Puytatishna (1899) have been recorded by Olimpia Boronat, Eugenia Bronskaya and Leonid Sobinov. His liturgical piece The Lord's Prayer has been recorded by Nicolai Gedda.

He died in Rome in 1927.

== Musical works ==
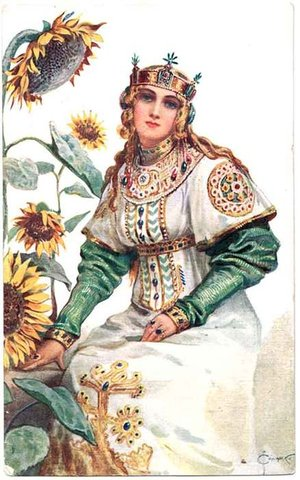
Zabava Putyatishna by Sergey Solomko

- Potemkin's Feast (or Potemkin's Holiday), opera (1888; 16 December 1902, St Petersburg)
- Zabava Putyatishna, opera (1899; 15 January 1899, Moscow)
- The Proud Woman, opera (not prod.)
- Woe to the Wise, opera (19 April 1910, Mariinsky Theatre, Saint Petersburg)
- La Vestale (a.k.a. Vyestalka), ballet (choreography by Marius Petipa; 29 February 1888; Mariinsky Theatre, St Petersburg)
- A Night in May, symphonic poem
- Savonarola, symphonic poem
- Suite champêtre
- A Requiem, symphonic prologue
- Medea, incidental music
- three orchestral suites
- several cantatas
- songs
- piano pieces

== Literary works ==
- Pushkin in Music, monograph (1900)
- Historic Development of Music in Russia (1910–11, 2 v.)

== Translations ==
- Eduard Hanslick's Vom Musikalisch-Schönen
- Nohl's Entwicklung der Kammermusik

== Sources ==
- Alexandria Vodarsky-Shiraeff, Russian Composers and Musicians
- Jennifer Spencer (2001). "Ivanov, Mikhail Mikhaylovich(i)". Grove Music Online (8th ed.). Oxford University Press. doi:10.1093/gmo/9781561592630.article.13992. ISBN 978-1-56159-263-0. (subscription required)
- Free scores by Mikhail Ivanov at the International Music Score Library Project (IMSLP)
