= Cornelis Witthoefft =

German pianist and vocal coach

- Born: 1964 (age 61–62); Hamburg
- Education: Hochschule für Musik und Theater Hamburg
- Occupations: Pianist; Conductor; Vocal coach; Academic teacher
- Organization: State University of Music and Performing Arts Stuttgart

Cornelis Witthoefft (born 1964) is a pianist, conductor, vocal coach and academic teacher. He has performed internationally and has taught lied interpretation at the State University of Music and Performing Arts Stuttgart from 2004.

== Life and career ==
Witthoefft was born in Hamburg in 1964. He first studied Protestant church music at the Hochschule für Musik und Theater Hamburg, organ with Heinz Wunderlich and piano with Helena Rocha. He studied further at the Universität der Künste in Vienna, orchestral conducting with Otmar Suitner, choral conducting with Günther Theuring and correpetition with Harald Goertz. He focused on lied interpretation with pianist Erik Werba. He graduated in 1989. A achieved a special prize of the internationalen lied competition "Franz Schubert und die Musik der Moderne" in Graz for music of the 20th century. His first engagement was solo répétiteur at the Vienna State Opera. He studied further from 1991 to 1997 at the University of Stuttgart, science of literature and philosophy.

Witthoefft has worked as a conductor at major opera houses in Europe such as the Opéra Bastille in Paris, the Flemish Opera in Antwerp, the Teatro di San Carlo in Naples, the Teatro Massimo in Palermo, at the Salzburg Festival and the New National Theatre Tokyo. He has appeared as a solo pianist, chamber musician and accompanist, in Europe and Japan where he also held master classes on German lieder.

He was appointed professor of lied (art song) at the State University of Music and Performing Arts Stuttgart in 2004.

== Bibliography ==
- Kutter, Uta; Annikke, Fuchs-Tennigkeit; Witthoefft, Cornelis; Hölderlin, Friedrich; Hölderlin-Tage (2023). Literarisches Portrait Friedrich Hölderlin mit einer Studie von Cornelis Witthoefft über die frühe kompositorische Rezeption von Hölderlins Lyrik und dem Erstdruck des Liedfragments "Hälfte des Lebens" von Bettine von Arnim (in German). Stuttgart: Kröner Verlag. ISBN 978-3-520-91202-2. OCLC 1411274902.
- Witthoefft, Cornelis (2001). Komponisten in Theresienstadt (in German). Hamburg: Initiative H. Krása. ISBN 978-3-00-005164-7. OCLC 47943575.

== Discography ==
- Simpson, Robert; Hartmann, Eva-Maria; Witthoefft, Cornelis; Lenehan, John; Wallfisch, Raphael; Johnson, Emma; Cigleris, Peter; Hannigan, Derek; Andreassen, Levi; Duerden, Will; Margulis, Daniil; Tippett Quartet (2025), Chamber music. Volume one, London: Toccata Classics, OCLC 1523283768
- Volkart-Schlager, Käthe; Wegener, Sarah; Witthoefft, Cornelis (2023), Wie sind die Tage schwer, Garten der Lieder (in German), SWR Classic, OCLC 1418677207
- Wegener, Sarah; Monno, Johannes; Witthoefft, Cornelis; Kurz, Dieter; Borin, Per; Circus Musicus; Stuttgarter Bläserakademie; Staatliche Hochschule für Musik und Darstellende Kunst Sinfonieorchester (2012), Resonanz 2011 (in German), Stuttgart: Staatliche Hochschule für Musik und Darstellende Kunst, OCLC 1184497854
- Mields, Dorothee; Prégardien, Christoph; Ruf, Juliane; Helgath, Florian; Busch, Christine; Payer, Götz; Schuck, Stefan; Wegener, Sarah; Witthoefft, Cornelis; Hauptmann, Cornelius; Melber, Klaus; Rademann, Hans-Christoph; Katschner, Wolfgang; Teuscher, Lydia; Müller, Christine; Weller, Andreas; Häger, Klaus; Reid, Michael; Schneiderman, Helene; Creed, Marcus; Vitzthum, Franz; Rial, Núria; Jaroussky, Philippe; Pluhar, Christina; Calmus Ensemble Leipzig; Salagon Quartett; SWR Vokalensemble Stuttgart; Piano-Duo Tal & Groethuysen; sirventes berlin; Dresdner Kammerchor; Lautten Compagney; Gambenconsort les Escapades; L' Arpeggiata (2016), Liebeslieder Volume 1 (in German), Stuttgart, Stuttgart: SWR2 Carus Verlag, OCLC 1327845263
