= Dmitri Smirnov (tenor) =

Russian opera singer (1882–1944)

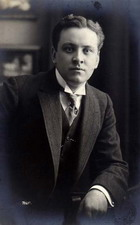
- Born: Dmitri Alexeyevich Smirnov; November 19, 1882; Moscow, Russian Empire
- Died: April 27, 1944 (aged 61); Riga, USSR
- Other names: Dmitry or Dimitri; Smirnoff
- Occupation: Operatic singer
- Years active: 1903-1930s

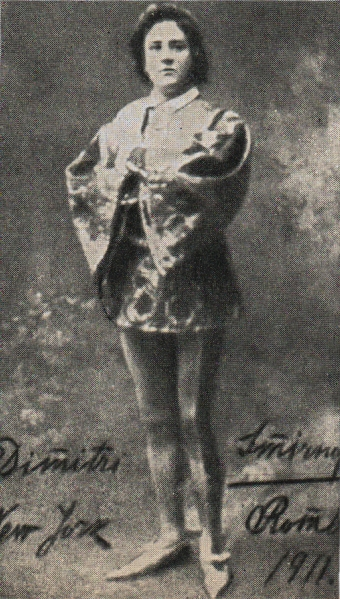
Dmitri Smirnov as Romeo at the Metropolitan Opera, New York City, 1911

Dmitri Alexeyevich Smirnov (Russian: Дмитрий Алексеевич Смирнов (also seen as Smirnoff), 19 November [O.S. 7 November] 1882 – April 27, 1944) was a Russian operatic tenor with a lyric voice and a bravura singing technique.

== Biography ==
A Muscovite, Smirnov was a student of Emiliya Pavlovskaya and Alexander Dodonov. He made his debut in St Petersburg in 1903 as Gigi in Eugenio Domenico Esposito's La Camorra. The venue was the Hermitage Theatre. In 1904, Smirnov became a member of the Bolshoi company in Moscow, singing there until 1910. He then sang at the Mariinsky Theatre, St Petersburg, from 1911 to 1917. (He had first appeared at the Mariinsky in 1907.)

Smirnov made his French début at the Paris Opéra in 1907. His successful Parisian performances led to an invitation for him to appear at the Metropolitan Opera, where he sang in 1911–12. Competition from the celebrated international tenors Enrico Caruso and John McCormack, who were also singing at the Met at that time, resulted in Smirnov's achieving limited success with New York audiences. In 1914, he performed in the "Russian Seasons" at London's Theatre Royal, Drury Lane. He would not sing in the United States again except for two performances of Tchaikovsky's The Queen of Spades with the Washington National Opera—a semi-professional company not related to its present namesake—in 1926. In 1915, he starred in the detective film The Secret of Box Letter A (Тайна Ложи Литер 'А'), produced by Alexander Drankov.

The tenor left his native land after the Russian Revolution of 1917, preferring to continue his career in the West. Among the cities he visited were Berlin, Monte Carlo, Milan, Rome, Madrid and Buenos Aires. In 1929, he returned to the Soviet Union for a concert tour. Smirnov became a citizen of the Estonian Republic on 4 February 1932, and took an active part as a soloist in the opera theater "Estonia". He taught singing in London and Athens and later retired to Riga (then USSR, now Latvia), where he died in 1944, aged 61.

Smirnov was equally comfortable performing lyric roles in Russian, French or Italian opera. His voice was plaintive in tone with easy high notes, great breath control, and a distinctive vibrato. Smirnov's main tenor rivals in Moscow and St Petersburg prior to the 1917 Revolution had been Leonid Sobinov (1871–1934) and Ivan Yershov (1867–1943). Yershov undertook heroic parts such as Siegfried and Otello which Smirnov never attempted, but Sobinov's repertoire was similar to that of Smirnov.

== Recordings ==
Smirnov left an estimated 90 recordings, the first made c. 1909 and the last around two decades later. Many of these recordings are available on CD reissues by various labels. They confirm his stature as one of the best Russian operatic tenors of the past 120 years—and perhaps the most imaginative artist among them.

== Sources ==
- Warrack, John and West, Ewan (1992), The Oxford Dictionary of Opera, 782 pages, ISBN 978-0-19-869164-8
- Holdridge, Lawrence F., (1996), Liner notes to Dmitri Smirnov, Pearl compact disc, Gemm CD 9241
