= Andrey Labinsky =

Russian opera singer

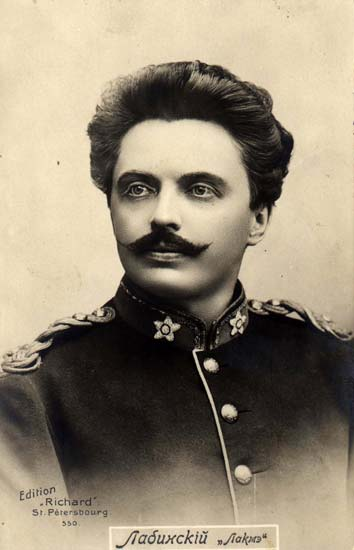
Andrey Labinsky

Andrey Markovich Labinsky (Russian: Андре́й Ма́ркович Лаби́нский; 20 August 1871, Tobolsk, Russian Empire – 8 August 1941, Moscow, Soviet Union) was a tenor from the Russian Empire.

== Biography ==
Labinsky was born to a large family in internal exile in Siberia. From 1881, he sang in the choir of Saint Sofia cathedral in Tobolsk. Labinsky moved to Tyumen and became a soloist in the Znamensky cathedral choir. After finishing school he became a soloist in the Synodal Choir. In 1899 he completed a course in solo singing at the Saint Petersburg Conservatory under Professors S.Gabel and V.Samus. He possessed an even, flexible voice with a pleasant, soft timbre and a wide range (going up to F in the third octave). From 1896 he sang in the Mariinsky Theater chorus. In 1899–1912 and 1919–1924 he was a soloist at the Mariinsky Theatre. After 1926 he worked at the Bolshoi Theatre.

== Creative work ==
His finest roles included Lensky, Herman, Almaviva, Faust, Don José, Raoul, Bayan, Lykov, Sadko, Radames, Lohengrin, and Luciano in the opera Francesca da Rimini by Eduard Nápravník.

Singers he worked with included Feodor Chaliapin and Antonina Nezhdanova.

He enjoyed unusual popularity, especially among female opera fans, who were nicknamed "Labinistki" and followed the singer on his tours across Russia. According to the Russian Musical Gazette of 1905, front-row tickets for his chamber concerts with the bass Kastorsky cost ten roubles (a great deal of money for the time). The same issue of the newspaper reported a tragicomic incident at one of concerts: the furious husband of one of the Labinistki shot at Labinsky, but he missed.

Labinsky was the understudy of Leonid Sobinov. The composer S. Kashevarov devoted his ballad "Silence" to the singer. Labinsky was killed during the first bombardment of Moscow in August 1941.
