= Boris Sobinov =

Russian composer (1895–1956)

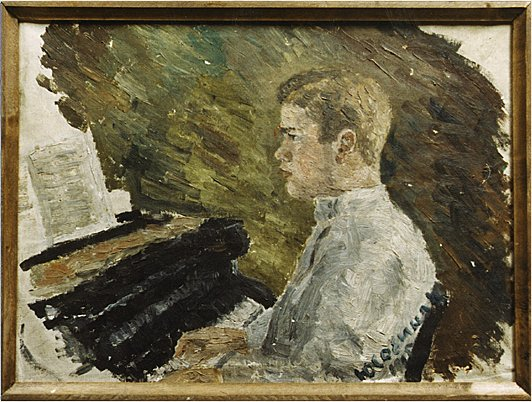
Yuri Sobinov: Boris Sobinov at the piano, 1910

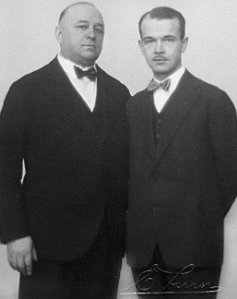
The famous Russian singer Leonid Sobinov with his son Boris

Boris Leonidovich Sobinov (Russian: Бори́с Леони́дович Со́бинов; 1895 in Moscow – 1956 in Klin) was a Russian composer and a son of Leonid Sobinov, Russia's leading lyric tenor during the first quarter of the 20th Century.

== Biography ==
Boris was the first child born to Maria Karzhavina, a dramatic actress, and Leonid Sobinov, a famous opera singer, who had met as schoolmates at the Philharmonic Society. Though their union dissolved after only a few years, Leonid remained an active and loving presence in the lives of Boris and his younger brother Yuri (1897-1920).

Boris received a military education while obtaining musical training. His younger brother Yuri (1897–1920) was a visual artist and painted the pictured oil portrait of Boris at the piano (1910).

Both brothers served in the tsarist army, and then in the White Army during the Civil War. Yuri was killed near Melitopol. Boris, along with army baron Pyotr Wrangel, managed to escape to Germany. He later graduated from Berlin's High Art School, where he later taught. Throughout his professorial years, he continued to compose his own works.

Leonid and Boris reunited as Leonid toured Berlin. In 1931 Boris settled in Riga, where Leonid spent much of a one-year sabbatical with his son, second wife Nina Mukina and daughter Svetlana. Eventually father and son toured Europe together, giving concerts in Finland, Estonia, Poland, the Balkans, Germany, and France. Preserved programs of these concerts are on display in Russia's Yaroslavl museum.

In 1945, when the Soviet troops entered into Berlin, Boris Leonidovich greeted victory with enthusiasm. At that time he lived in the American zone of Berlin and was invited to give a concert for Russian troops. But instead he was abducted by the NKVD, brought to the airport, and sent to Minsk. He was convicted and spent 10 years in the prisons and labour camps of the GULAG. He was rehabilitated in 1955, but with a "wolf ticket" that means an internal exile without the right to settle closer than 100 km from large urban centers.

During the last year of his life, he lived in Klin at the Tchaikovsky's House-Museum, where Yuri Lvovich Davydov (the nephew of Pyotr Tchaikovsky) and his daughters Irina and Xenia gave him refuge. Boris occasionally secretly visited the house of his father in Moscow and his dacha in Peredelkino. Boris Sobinov died in 1956 of cancer.

== Quotations ==
"In 1945 Boris Sobinov was stolen from Berlin American Zone by the NKVD and was condemned to 10 years imprisonment in the USSR. He was liberated in 1955 and died in 1956. The Memorial Museum keeps his comb, spectacles and spectacle case. Nina and Svetlana Sobinov donated his musical scores, which were composed in Germany between 1920 and 1930. This music is unknown to the Russian musical scene because his works haven't been performed here yet. The time when this will happen is still approaching. The name of Boris Sobinov is another name of a talented composer whose music should be opened to people. His music was performed in Finland, Poland, France, and Germany where the musical scores and other documents could survive." (quoted from The Memorial Museum's website)

"Once in the early spring of 1955 on the Klin streets there was noted Boris Leonidovich Sobinov, the son of the great tenor. It was not only the memory of Tchaikovsky that led him to Klin. Boris Sobinov intended to hire an apartment and live some time in Klin after release from the prisons, in the expectation of total rehabilitation. Klin housewives recalled with regret that he didn’t find a suitable apartment. Most likely, the vigilant organs of state security (KGB) did not permit him to settle in Klin. Klin nevertheless is not just 101st kilometre." (Anatoly Khomyakov)
