= Leonid Sobinov =

Russian opera singer (1872–1934)

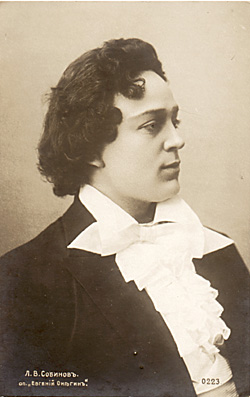
- Born: Leonid Vitalyevich Sobinov; 7 June 1872; Yaroslavl, Russian Empire
- Died: 14 October 1934 (aged 62); Riga, Latvia
- Burial place: Novodevichy Cemetery
- Occupation: Opera singer
- Years active: 1897–1933

Leonid Vitalyevich Sobinov (Russian: Леони́д Вита́льевич Со́бинов), born 7 June [O.S. 26 May] 1872 and died 14 October 1934) was a Russian operatic tenor. In 1923, he was made a People's Artist of the RSFSR.

== Biography ==
La donna è mobile
La donna è mobile (Rigoletto, Giuseppe Verdi) performed by Leonid Sobinov

Leonid Sobinov was born in Yaroslavl, into the family of the lower middle-class trade officer Vitaly Vasilyevich Sobinov. Sobinov's mother, who died early, was a keen singer. Leonid, inspired by her, began singing himself. In 1881, he entered a boys' school at the age of nine, graduating in 1890 with a silver medal. As a schoolboy, he played the guitar and participated in a local choir.

He attended university in Moscow, receiving a degree in law in 1894. After university, Sobinov completed his military service and began practicing law. At the same time, he studied singing in Moscow under professors Alexander Dodonov and Alexandra Santagano Gorchakova. In 1897, his professors suggested that he attend an audition at the city's Bolshoi Theatre. Following his audition, he was offered a two-year contract at the company.

Sobinov debuted at the Bolshoi as the lead in Rubinstein's The Demon, and would go on to appear in Moscow and Saint Petersburg in operas such as Ruslan and Ludmila, Faust, Manon, Prince Igor, Eugene Onegin, Halka, Rigoletto, Lohengrin, Tannhäuser (as Walter von der Vogelweide) and Mikhail Ivanov's Zabava Putyatishna (as Solovey Budimirovich).

While working at the Bolshoi, Sobinov appeared onstage with operatic bass Feodor Chaliapin in 1899. In that same year, he added the parts of Andrei (Mazeppa), Gérald (Lakmé) and Alfredo Germont (La traviata) to his repertoire. After going through the score of Carmen, he declined to take on the role of Don José, insisting that its dramatic nature would be too taxing for his voice.

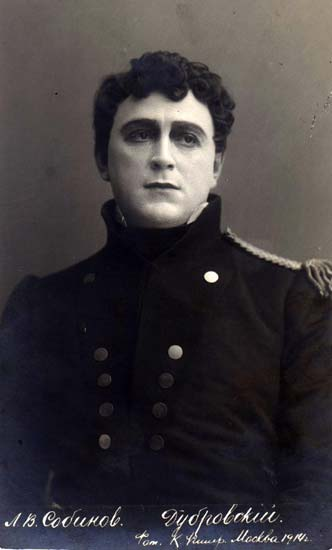
As Dubrovsky in Dubrovsky (1914)

In order to enlarge his operatic repertoire (having already added to it the tenor leads in Martha, Werther, Mignon and Roméo et Juliette), Sobinov decided to travel to Italy, so that he could experience Italian opera directly.

From 1904 to 1906 and again in 1911 he appeared at Italy's premier opera house, La Scala, Milan. The first opera he performed in here was Rigoletto. As well as the Bolshoi and La Scala, he sang at the Mariinsky Theatre, Saint Petersburg; Palais Garnier, Paris; Royal Opera House, Covent Garden, London; Opéra de Monte-Carlo, Monte Carlo; and Teatro Real, Madrid.

Contemporary critics noted that Sobinov was one of several prominent Russian tenors active at the time, alongside Dmitri Smirnov, Andrey Labinsky, Lev Klementiev, and Ivan Yershov.

Sobinov married Maria Karzhavina, a Philharmonic Society schoolmate, and had two sons with her—Boris and George (Yuri) Sobinov. In 1915, he later married Nina Mukhina, sister of the Soviet sculptor Vera Mukhina. Together they had one daughter, Svetlana.

In 1917, after the Russian Revolution, Sobinov became the first elected director of the Bolshoi Theatre. He undertook a theatrical trip to Ukraine in 1918 and found himself cut off temporarily from Russia. In 1919, he was assigned to the role of chairman of the musical committee of the all-Ukrainian Division of Arts in Kiev.

In 1920 he became a manager at the Division of Public Education in Sevastopol. That same year, his son Yuri, who served in the White Army, was killed near Melitopol. His other son, Boris (1895–1956), a music composer, emigrated to Germany.

After about a year, Sobinov returned to his job as director of the Bolshoi Theatre in 1921. Two years later, he was selected to be a deputy of the Moscow City Council. He made his final stage appearance in 1933 at a Bolshoi gala held in his honor. The following year, he began work at the operatic studio of Konstantin Stanislavski as the studio's artistic leader.

On October 14, 1934, Sobinov died in his sleep from a heart attack in Riga's Hotel Saint Petersburg. His body was transported back to Moscow by train. He was buried on October 19 at the Novodevichy Cemetery in Moscow.

Minor planet 4449 Sobinov is named in his honor.

== Recordings: CD reissues ==
Sobinov left a large legacy of recordings made prior to the 1917 Revolution. Many of them have been remastered and reissued on compact disc by various firms. These reissues include:

- The Harold Wayne Collection Vol. 36 - His First Recordings 1901–1904, Symposium
- Leonid Sobinov - Recordings 1910 – 1911, Symposium
- Leonid Sobinov - The HMV Catalogue Recordings, Pearl
- Rimsky-Korsakov performed by his Contemporaries, Russian Disc
- Singers of Russia 1900 - 1917 / Sergej Levik and Contemporaries, Symposium
- Singers of Imperial Russia Vol. 1, Pearl
- La Scala Edition Vol. 1, EMI
- Greatest Voices of the Bolshoi, Melodiya
- The 30 Tenors, Symposium
- The Voices of the Tsar Vol. 1 (1901–1915), Minerva
- Mike Richter's Opera Page: The Record of Singing Vol. 1 CD-ROM.
