= Victor Sokovnin =

Russian opera singer

Victor Alexandrovch Sokovnin (Russian: Виктор Александрович Соковнин; 1886–1937) was a Soviet Russian opera singer and vocal teacher. He was born in Zavodouspenskoe, a village in Tyumen county in the Tobolsk Province (now Tugulymsky district, Sverdlovsk Oblast). In 1906 he graduated from business school, and was a clerk for the Society for Mutual Aid in Yekaterinburg. From 1911 to 1918 he studied at the solo singing class of Professor I. Ya. Gordy at the Moscow State Conservatory.

== In Krasnoyarsk ==
In 1920, after the Civil War, he took part in the theatrical life of the city of Krasnoyarsk. He taught at the vocal department of the People's Conservatory, created by P.I. Slovtsov. He actively participated in the performances delivered by this remarkable Russian tenor in the opera troupe and was Slovtsov's stage partner in La Traviata. He participated in the Krasnoyarsk Philharmonic Society's "music to the masses" program from 1928 to 1931, Until its closure by Glavrepetkomom. For some time, he led the music school in the city of Tyumen.

== In Omsk ==
In July 1935, V.A. Sokovnin he became a director of the Omsk Music School, and from 1934 to January 1938 served on the Board of Directors with four other people (N.V. Komov, D.I. Dianov, G.N. Grishkevich, and V.M. Mozhayeva). During this time, the Omsk school was renamed for Soviet composer V.Y. Shabalin, a member of its first graduating class. To search for talented youth in the Omsk region, he went on a special expedition of teachers from the Muses College. In Sverdlovsk, Viktor acquired an excellent Sheets Library, where he found the score of the opera "Boris Godunov" by Modest Mussorgsky, personal proofreader amended Rimsky-Korsakov, not entered into the later editions of the opera. He created a branch school-based educational institution in Omsk and a military school and managed the railroad, which allowed the school to upgrade to the status of a musical college. Sokovnin organized the first symphony orchestra in Omsk from college students, musicians and fans of local theater, and organizedg the reconstruction of the old stables at a hostel for students and teachers, to fight the acute housing shortage. He organized concerts in Omsk Brass (leader-V. J. Verzhahovsky, later Professor of the Novosibirsk Conservatory) and symphony orchestras in the clubs of Omsk. He was the initiator of the tour in Omsk by outstanding musicians, including violinist B.O. Sibor, violin professor P. Ilchenko of the Moscow Conservatory and piano professor Aleksandr Goldenweiser, and V.N. Shatsky, director of the Moscow Conservatory.

== Sentencing and rehabilitation ==
In 1936, he was dismissed from work, and he was arrested on 14 September 1937, accused of anti-Soviet activities under Article 58 of the Criminal Code of the RSFSR. On October 10, he was sentenced to death, and Sokovnin was executed on November 24, 1937 One of the accusations made by Sergeant NKVD P.G. Popandopulo , was the purchase of music, "in of which include the patriotic musical numbers of the autocratic Russian government, up to "God Save the Tsar". A month before Sovkovnin's execution, his father-in-law Petrov Ivan Mihajlovich, manager of a factory manufacturing railway cross ties in Omsk, had been shot. In 1960, 23 years after his execution, Viktor Sokovnin was exonerated for lack of evidence of anti-Soviet activities.

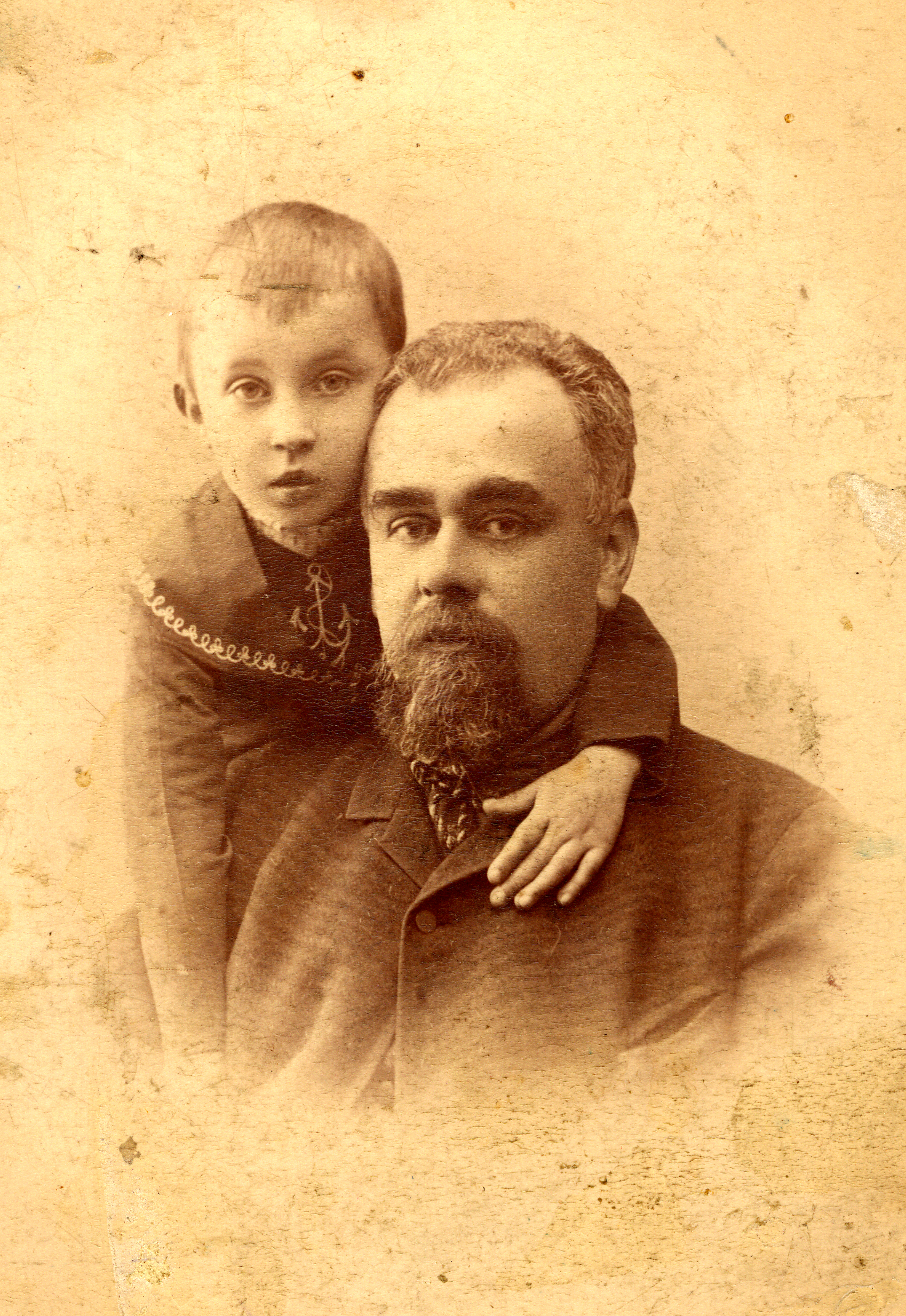
Victor with his godfather. 1888-1890.

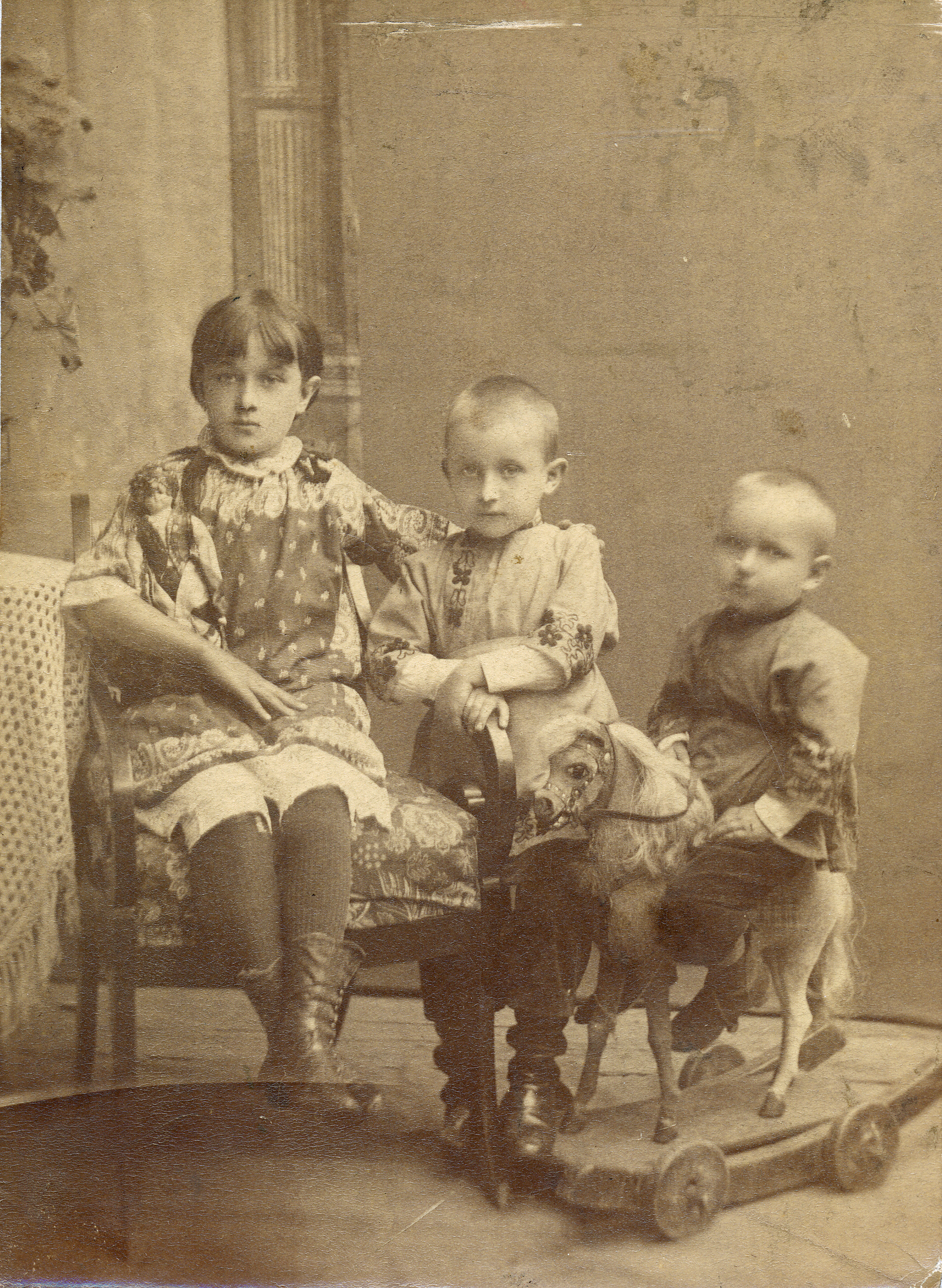
Sister Alexanddra, Victor and brother Mikhail

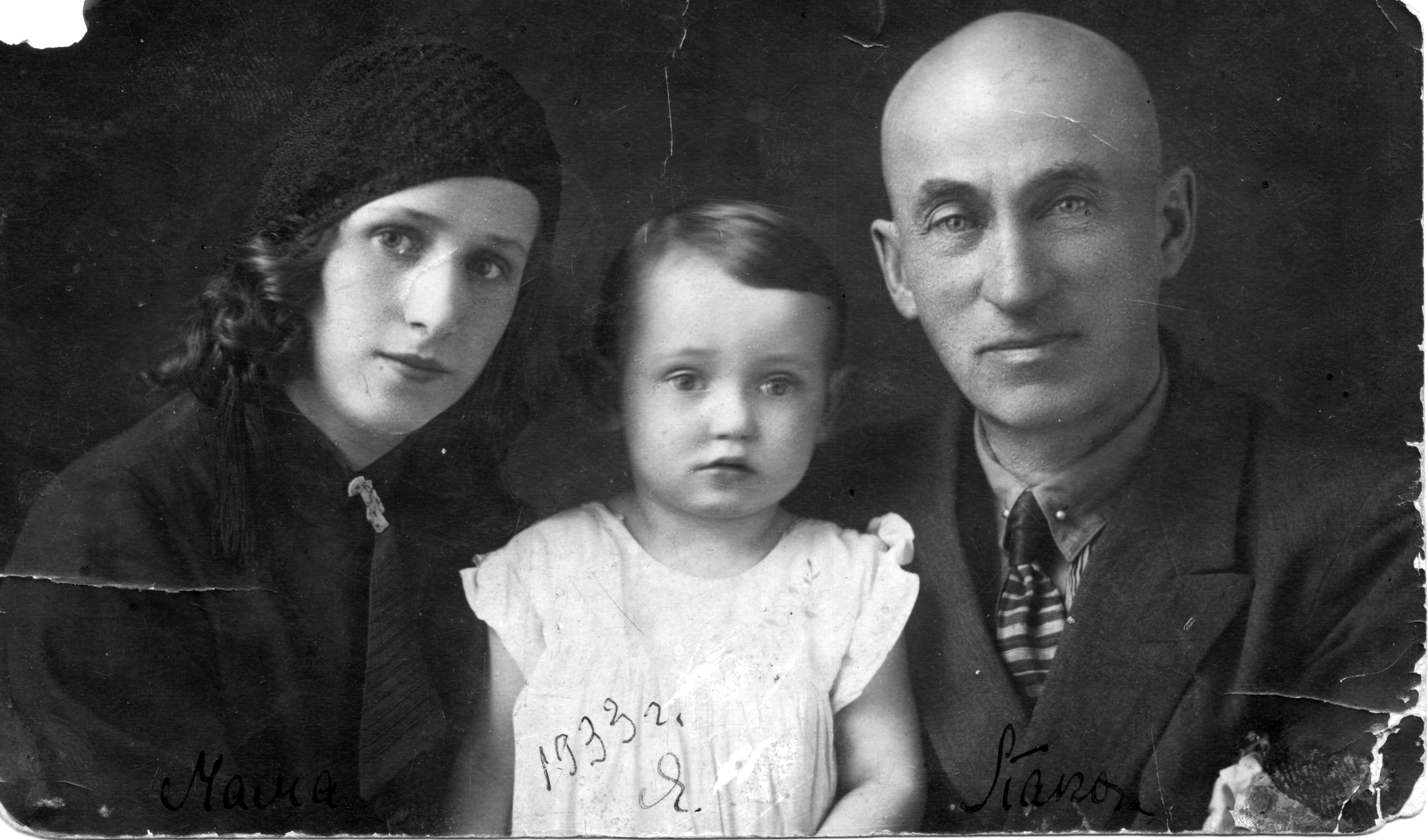
V.A. Sokovnin with his daughter - Marianne and wife-Vera Ivanovna Petrova(Nikolaeva), 1933.

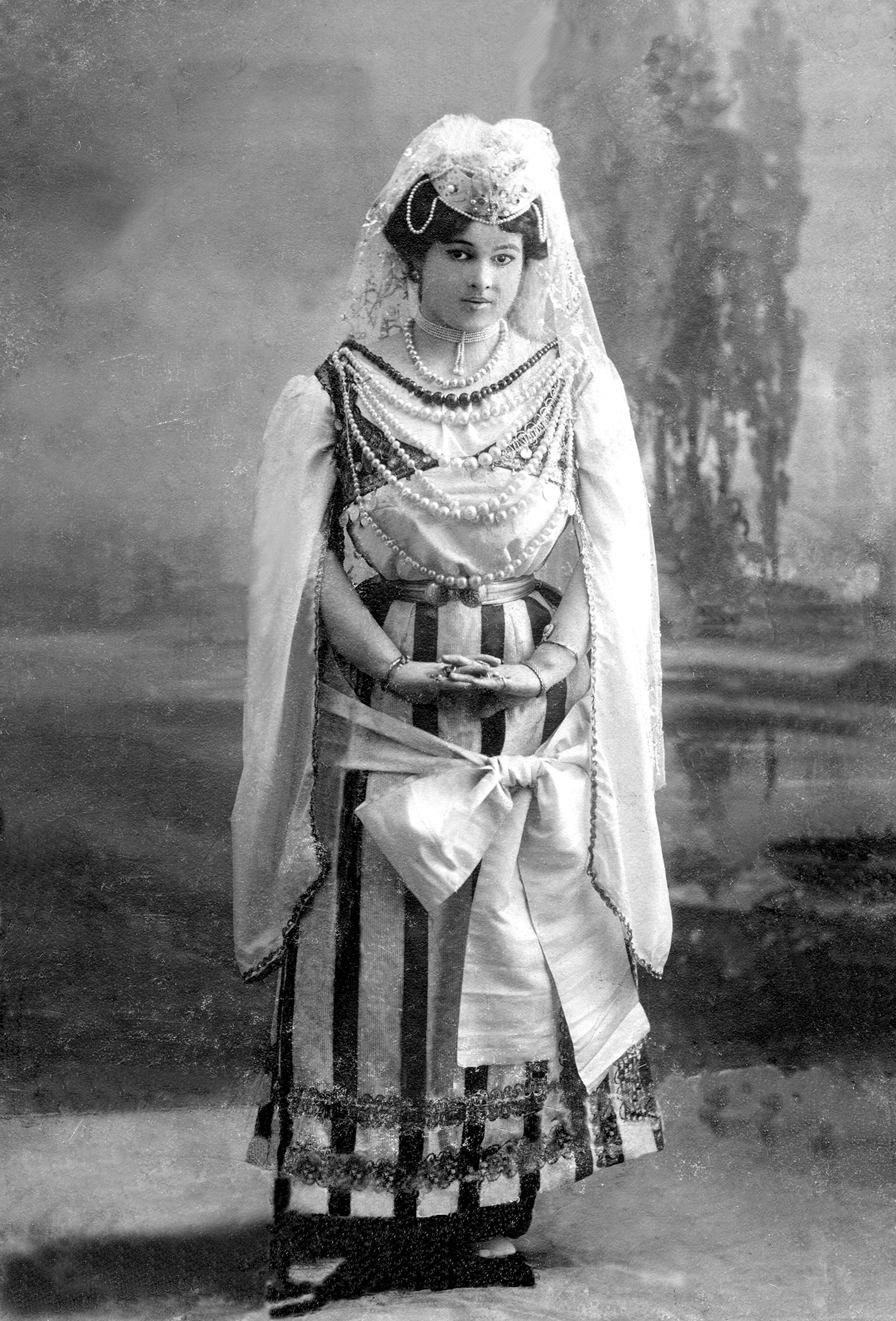
Singer Olga Shlis, 1905 Ekaterinburg. An opera "Ruslan and Ludmila". From donative V.A.Sokovnin on the back

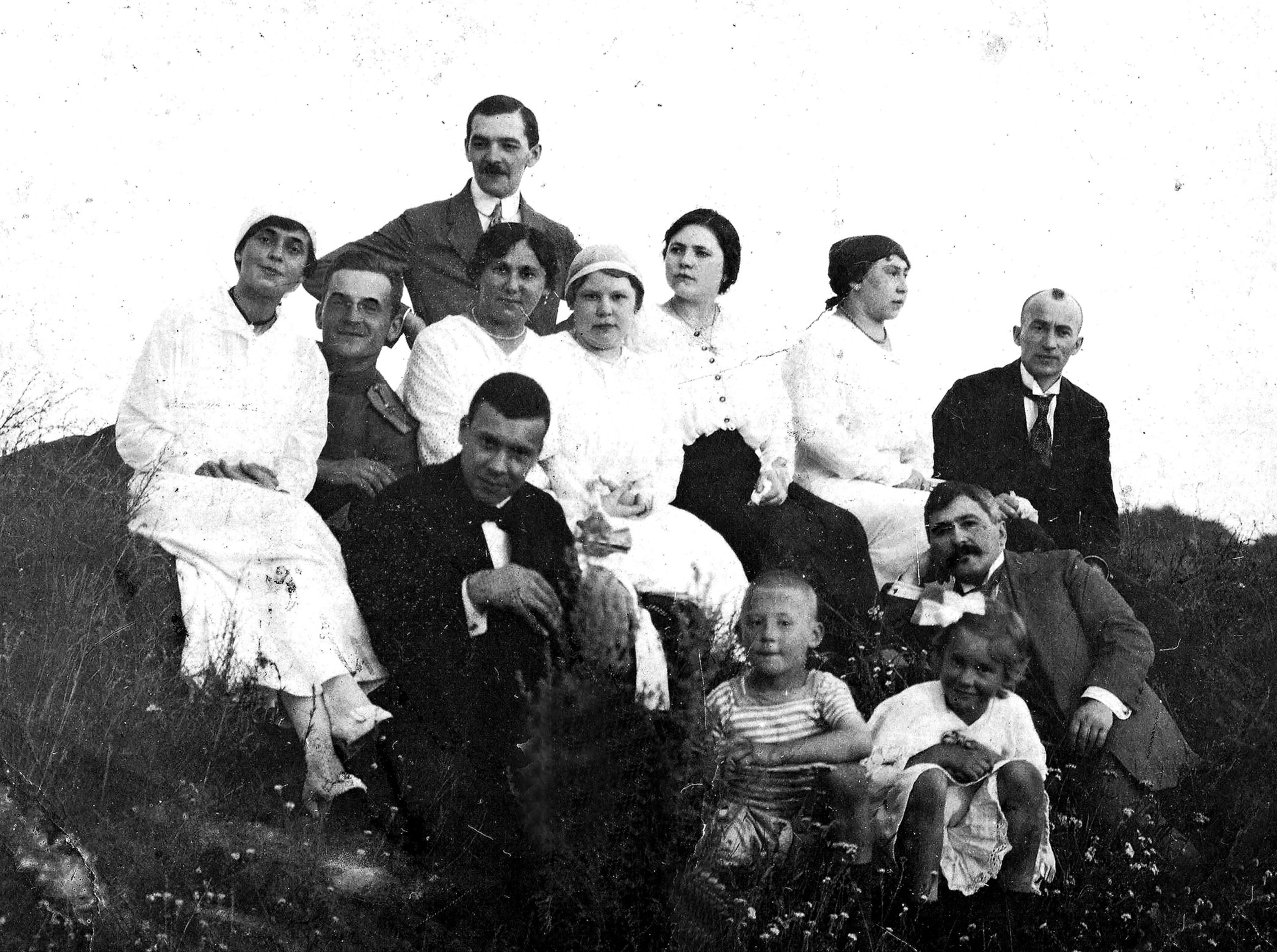
В.А. Соковнин-справа верхний ряд, 1914 г.

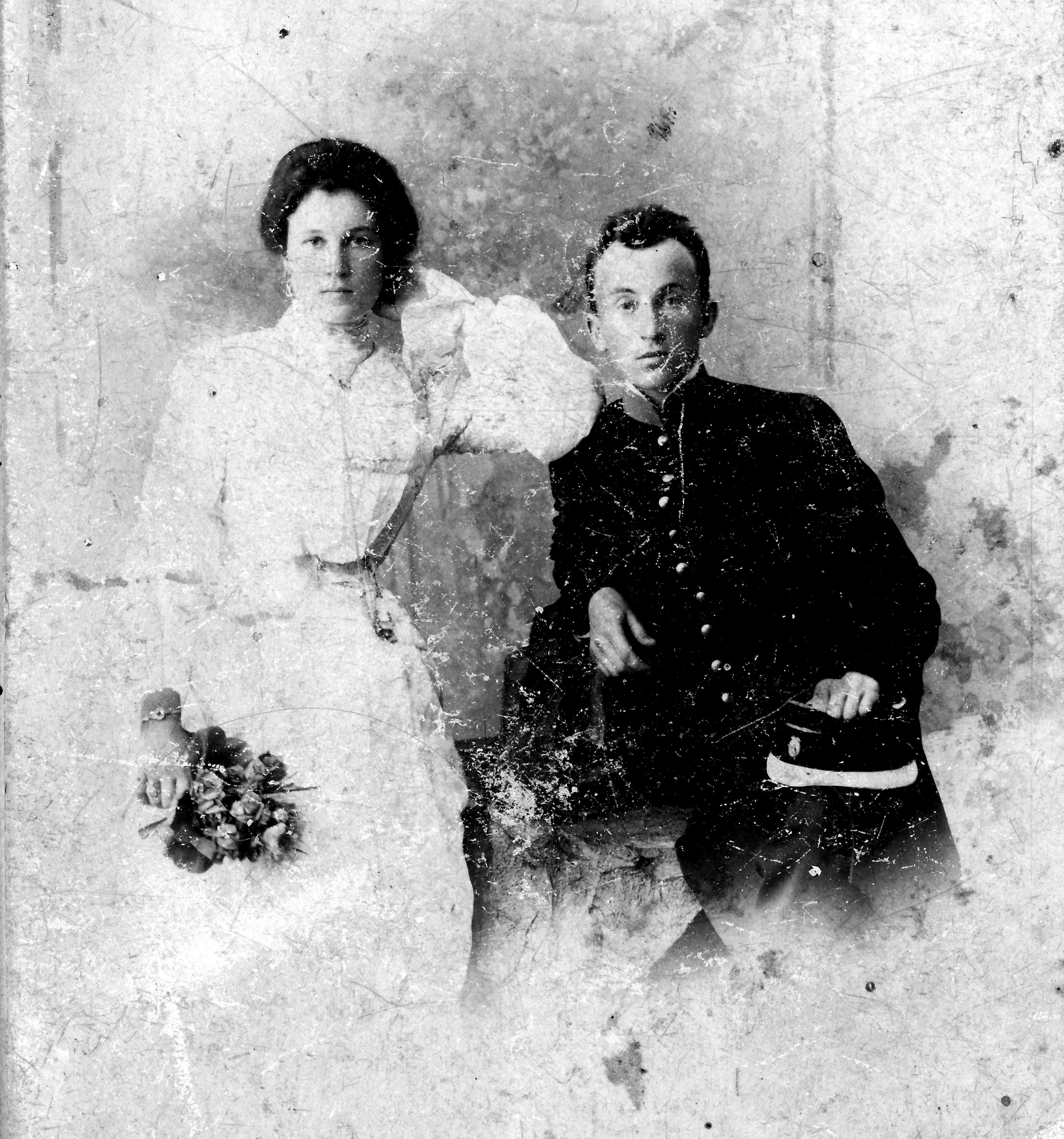
V. Sokovnin with his sister-Alexandra. 1903-1905 гг.

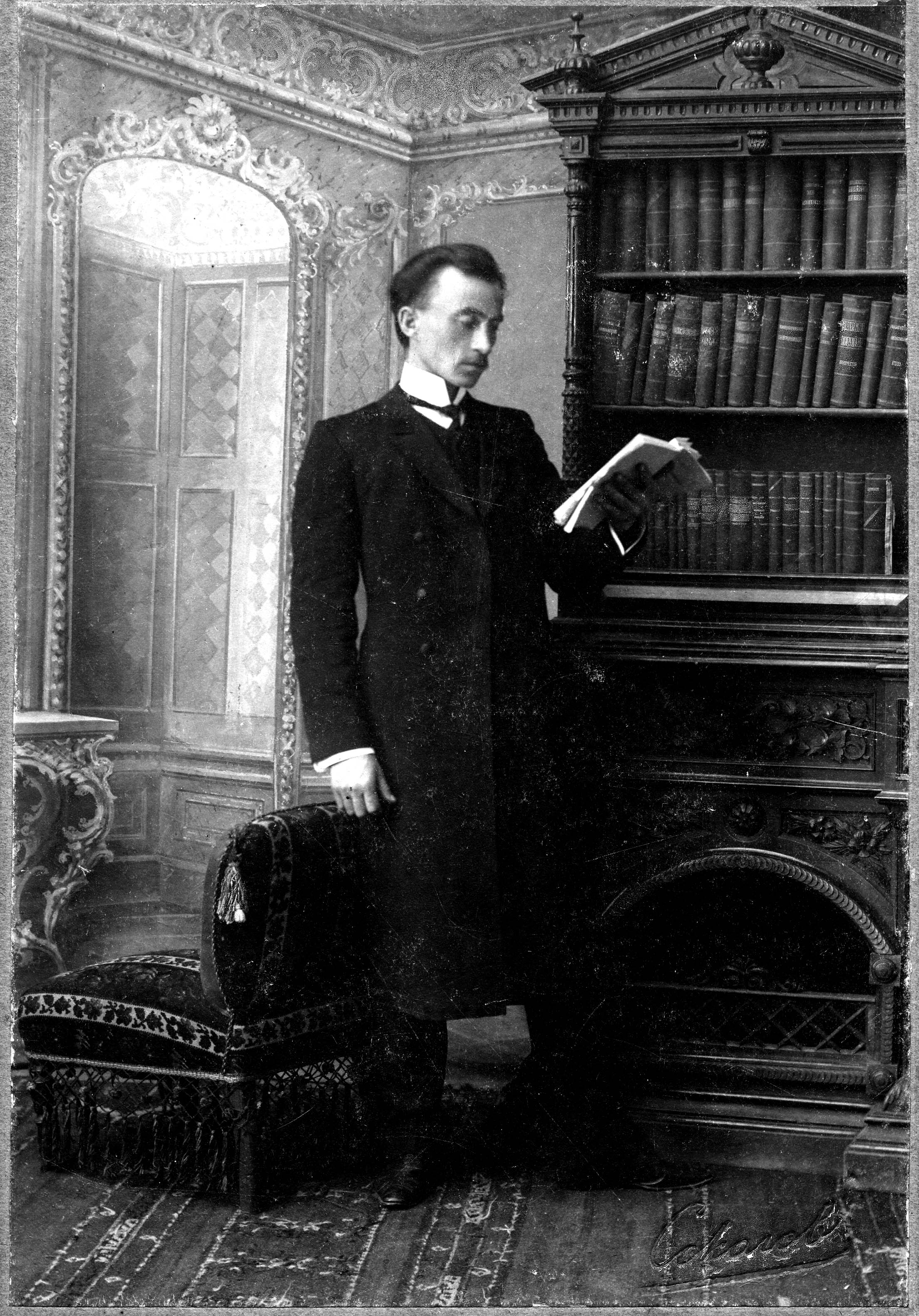
V. Sokovnin. Cabinet photo

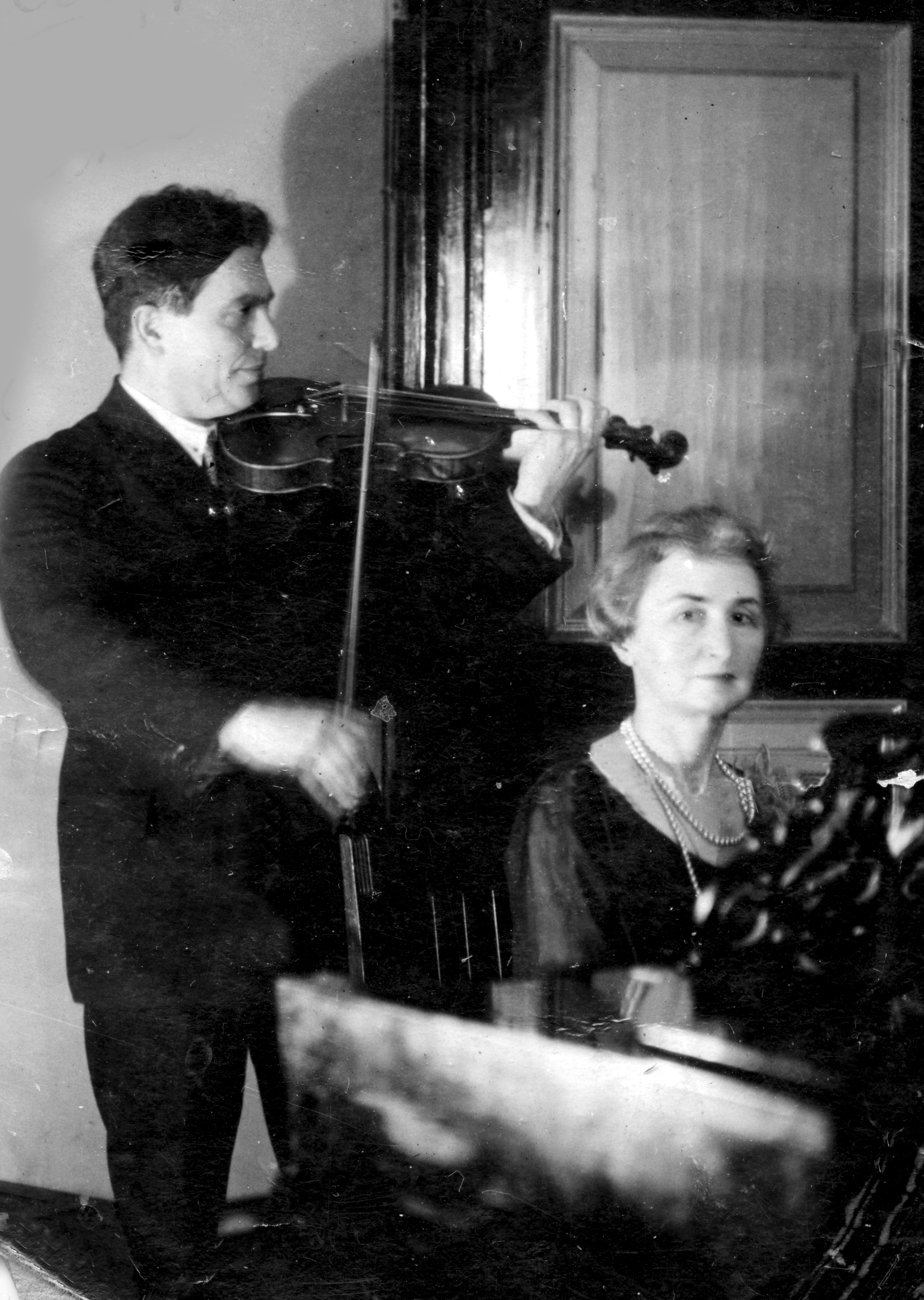
Peter Ilchenko-professor of Moscow State Conservatory. Omsk, 1936.

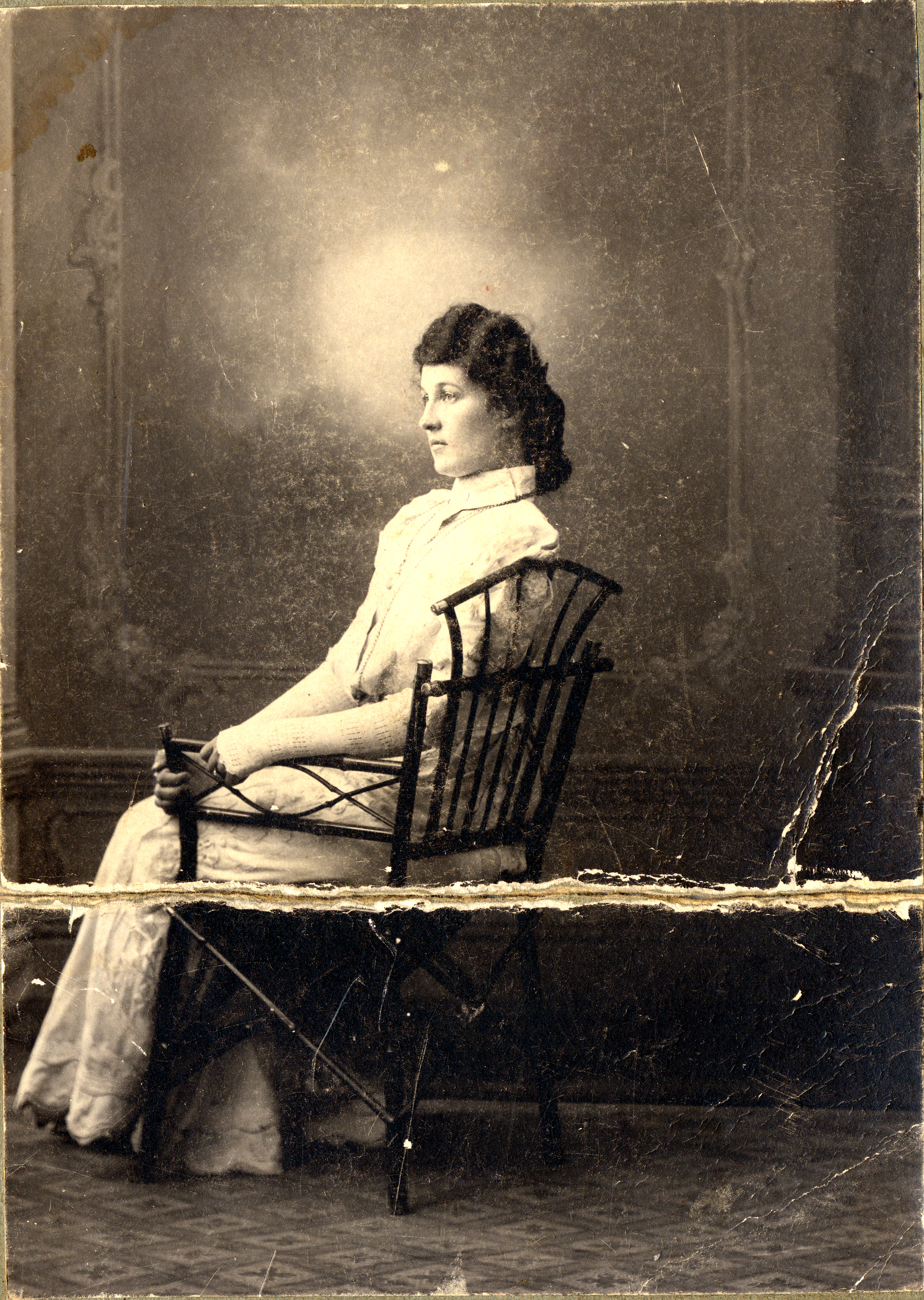
Sokovnin`s sister-Alexandra. 1908-1910

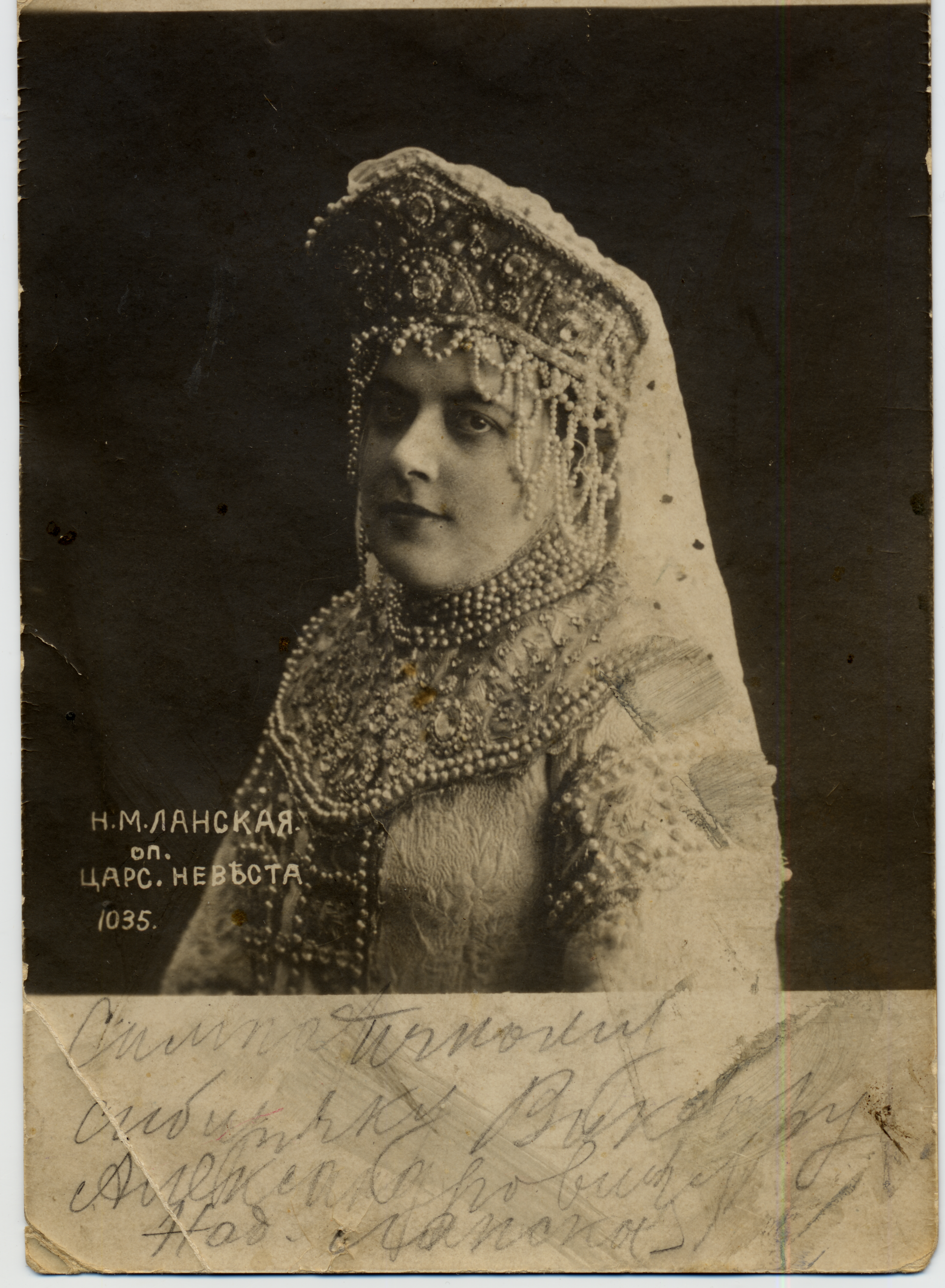
Opera singer N. Lanskaya

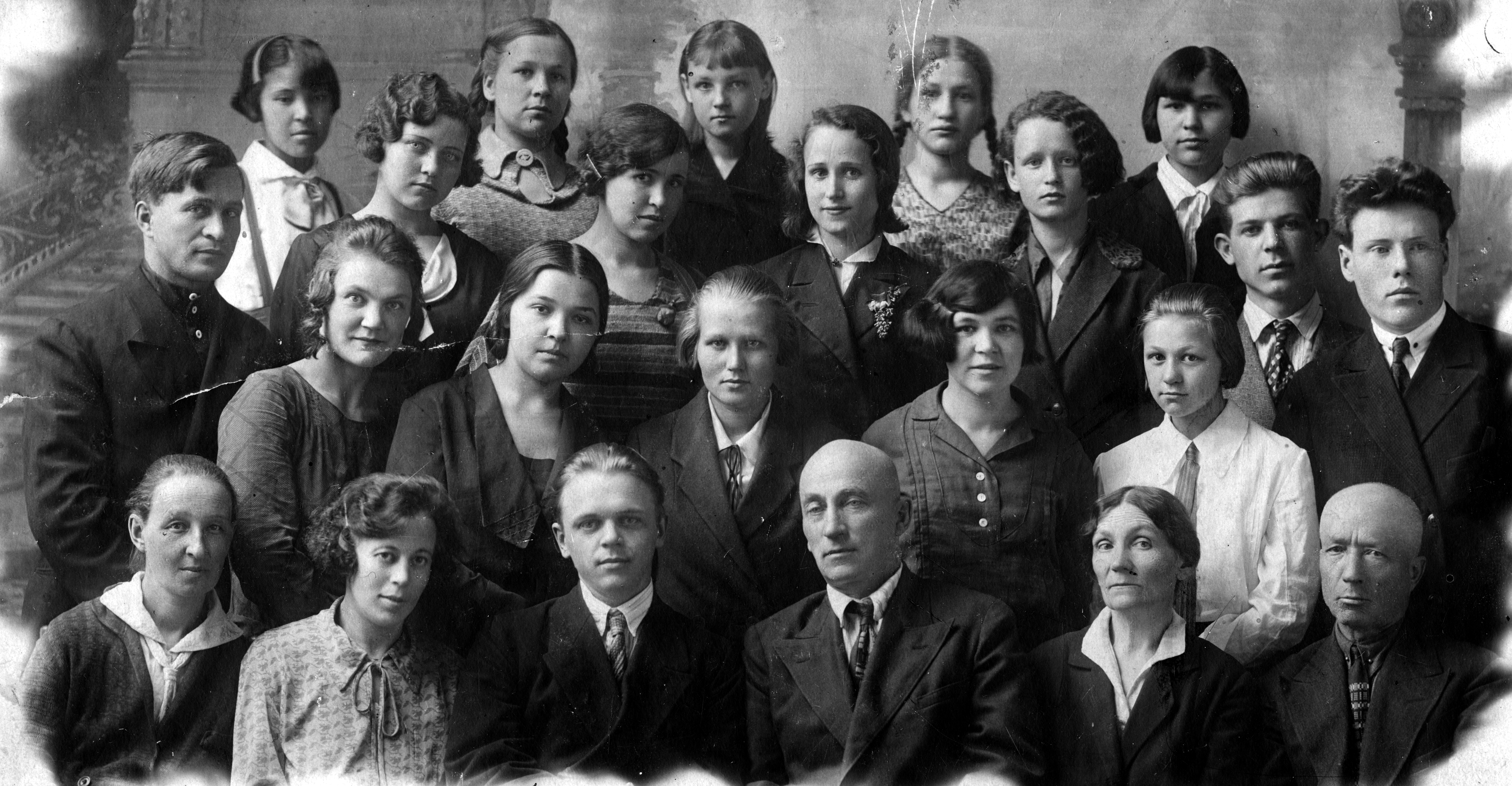

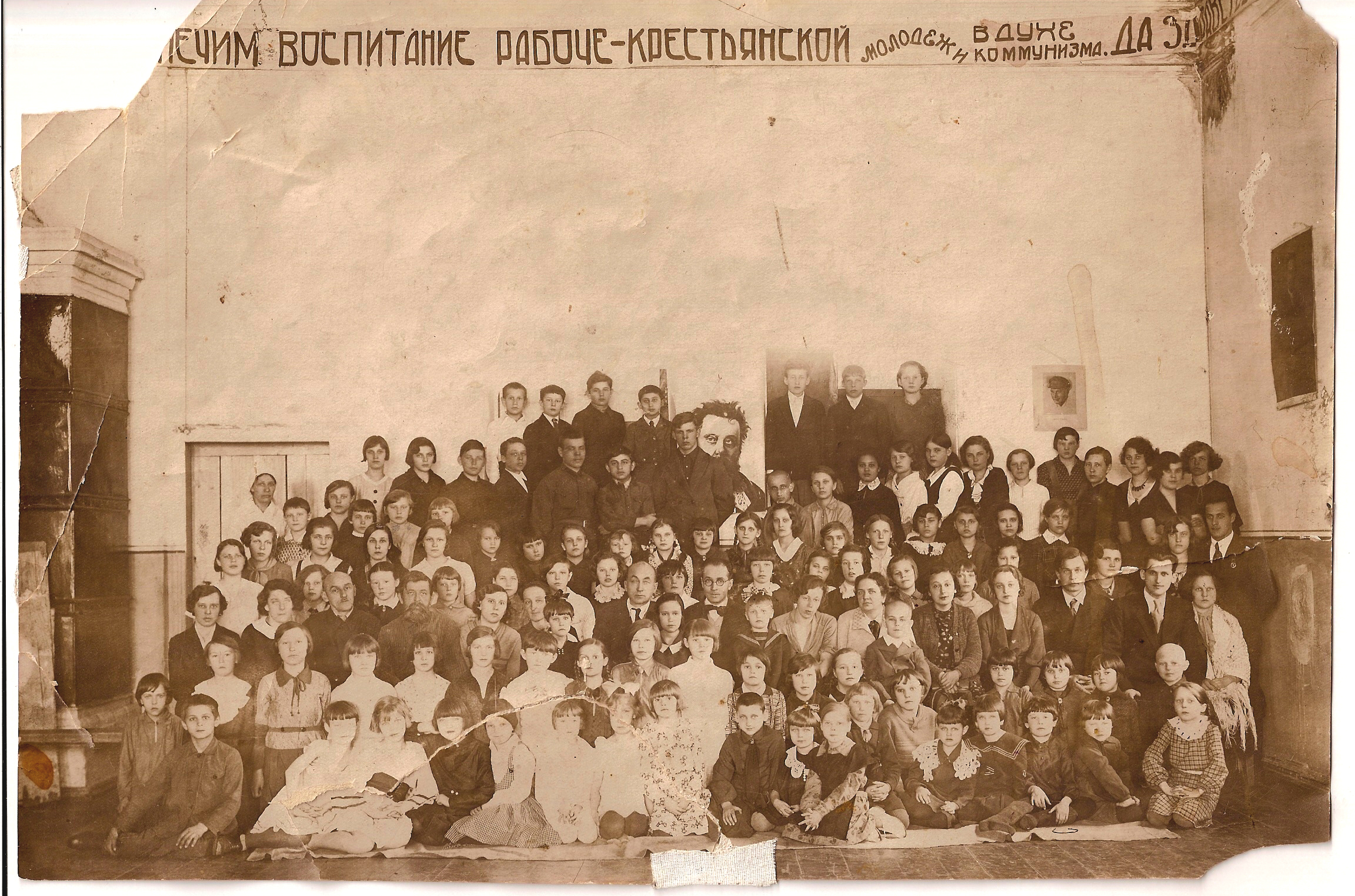
Pupiels of music school of Tumen. To the left from Sokovnin - music teacher and pianist George Kochevitsky, husband of Nina Berberova. 1936 г.

== Sources ==
- (in Russian) Sergey Rychkov. "Leeches, "God Save the Tsar!" and Pavlik Morozov". «Yamalskiy meridian», the magazine of history and literature, № 7, 2009, p. 39.
