= Vocal coach =

Person who helps singers prepare for a performance

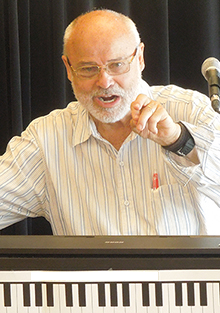
Vocal coach Seth Riggs at a 2013 vocal workshop

A vocal coach, also known as a voice coach (though this term often applies to those working with speech and communication rather than singing), is a music teacher, usually a piano accompanist, who helps singers prepare for a performance, often also helping them to improve their singing technique and take care of and develop their voice, but is not the same as a singing teacher (also called a "voice teacher"). Vocal coaches may give private music lessons or group workshops or masterclasses to singers. They may also coach singers who are rehearsing on stage, or who are singing during a recording session. Vocal coaches are used in both classical music and in popular music styles such as rock and gospel. While some vocal coaches provide a range of instruction on singing techniques, others specialize in areas such as breathing techniques or diction and pronunciation.

== Roles ==
A vocal coach is sometimes responsible for writing and producing vocal arrangements for four-part harmony for backup vocalists, or helping to develop counter melodies for a secondary vocalist. Some vocal coaches may also advise singers or bands on lyric-writing for a music production. Some critics allege that in some cases where popular music recordings credit a singer for work as a vocal coach during a recording, this may be a subtle way of acknowledging a ghostwriting role, in which the coach writes lyrics for a singer-songwriter or rapper.

In the 2000s, the increasing use of recording software which contains vocal processing algorithms and digital pitch correction devices is replacing some of the roles of the vocal coach. In the 1970s, if a producer wanted to record a single with a popular sports star with few vocal skills, the celebrity would need weeks of vocal coaching to learn their song and improve their tone and diction. In the 2000s, the vocals are often processed through pitch correction software instead, and rhythm can be corrected within digital audio workstations. This enables 2000s-era producers and audio engineers to make an untrained performer's singing sound closer to that of a trained vocalist.

== Training and experience ==
The training and education of vocal coaches varies. Many vocal coaches are former or current professional singers. Some vocal coaches have formal training, such as a Bachelor of Music, a Master of Music, a music school diploma, or degrees in related areas such as foreign languages or diplomas in human kinetics, posture techniques, or breathing methods. Some vocal coaches have little formal training, and rely on their experience as a performer.

Vocal coaches may come to their profession through other routes, such as related musical professions or from other fields. Some vocal coaches are rehearsal pianists with experience accompanying singers, or former or current choral, music theater, or symphony conductors. More rarely, vocal coaches may come to the profession from a nonmusical route. For example, a specialist in Alexander Technique, yoga, or medical aspects of the throat and vocal cords may begin to specialize in coaching and training singers.

Salaries vary greatly, as do the conditions of work. While a small number of vocal coaches can command very high hourly or daily rates, most vocal coaches, like most other music and arts professionals, tend to have salaries which are below the average for other professions which require a similar amount of education and experience. The work conditions vary widely, from part-time or occasional freelance work for individual singers, opera companies, or record companies, to full-time contracts or multi-year jobs for universities (coaching vocal performance students and students in opera courses) or music theater companies.

== Methods of instruction ==
While vocal coaches use many different techniques to teach singing, they will usually instruct students in one or more of the following methods:

- Private singing lessons (usually in 30-minute, 45-minute or 60-minute increments)
- Group lessons (this is two or more students working with the vocal coach; for example, a barbershop quartet might get coaching as a group)
- Recording studio coaching that takes place in a recording studio with a microphone and multitrack recording equipment, which is operated by an audio engineer. Singing for recordings requires different singing techniques than singing at live shows. To give one example, when a singer is performing at a small coffeehouse gig without a microphone, they do not need to worry about "plosive" consonants (such as the letter "p"); however, when singing in front of a microphone, words with the letter "p" can be overemphasized by the microphone, due to the nature of the way we produce these sounds.
- Workshops (by definition, a workshop involves a number of students and the vocal coach; as well, there may be an audience watching the workshop process)
- Digitally or through online singing lessons (e.g., via Skype or FaceTime) in which audio or video is transmitted of the instructor singing and the student imitates the instructor. The instructor can also hear the student sing and provide coaching on their singing. In most cases, there is a small delay in the audio transmitted during digital voice lessons so the instructor is not able to actively accompany the student. Instead, the voice teacher plays a tone or chord and demonstrates the scale or exercises which they wish for the student to sing. The student then imitates the instructor. The instructor can then modulate the scale upwards while the student follows, singing the same scale pattern.
- Accompaniment by a pianist is often part of vocal coaching. The vocal coach may double as a vocal coach and as an accompanist. In other cases, the vocal coach may hire an accompanist to play during the coaching sessions. The piano is one of the most common instruments used for accompaniment, as it can be used to play basslines, chords and melodies at the same time. Other instruments may also be used (e.g., guitar, Hammond organ, etc.) but are less common.

== Nomenclature: vocal coach vs. voice teacher ==
Within the community of voice teachers, there has been some debate about the terms "vocal coach" and "voice teacher".

While many believe the terms are synonymous, some professionals in the music community hold that the terms have slightly different meanings.

The terms "voice teacher" and "singing teacher" are most often used to refer to a teacher that has been educated and instructs vocal pedagogy, while a vocal coach may not possess the same education level.

In universities, for example, it would be rare to have a professor of voice refer to themselves as a vocal coach, even though they may teach private lessons.

Additionally, the term "voice teacher" or "singing teacher" normally refers to an instructor whose main role is developing the singing voice. The term "vocal coach", on the other hand, may be appropriated by someone who works on stage performance, vocal style or a host of other subjects that are related to voice, but not necessarily teach singing.

== See also ==
- List of vocal coaches
