= Metropolitan Opera Live in HD =

High-definition satellite video transmissions

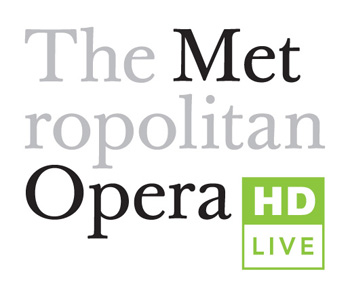

Metropolitan Opera Live in HD (also known as The Met: Live in HD) is a series of live opera performances transmitted in high-definition video via satellite from the Metropolitan Opera in New York City to select venues, primarily movie theaters, in the United States and other parts of the world. The first transmission was of a condensed English-language version of Mozart's The Magic Flute on December 30, 2006. Many of the video recordings are later rebroadcast via public television as part of the Great Performances at the Met series, and most are made available for streaming at Met Opera on Demand, a collection which also includes earlier SD video and analog telecasts and audio recordings from Metropolitan Opera radio broadcasts.

== History ==
To transmit the series via satellite simulcast in the US and Canada, the Met partnered with Fathom Events. The series is broadcast to AMC Theatres, Cinemark, Cineplex Entertainment, Regal Entertainment Group (Regal Cinemas, United Artists and Edwards), Goodrich, Kerasotes, Marcus and National Amusements movie theaters, as well as a series of independent venues such as arts centers and college campuses. Its aims include building a larger audience for the Met and garnering excitement for arts at a local level.

The original idea for presenting operas in this way came from the new incoming general manager of the Met, Peter Gelb in late 2006. Gelb brought in veteran TV director Gary Halvorson to oversee the series. Exhibiting the Met's performances in digital movie theaters is in line with other audience-expanding efforts by the Met such as radio broadcasts on Sirius Radio, iPod downloads, live streaming video on the Met website, and free opening night screenings in Times Square and at Lincoln Center. The Met is also sponsoring free HD broadcasts into selected New York City public schools.

Tom Galley, chief operations and technology officer of National CineMedia, described the experience by saying:

This Metropolitan Opera series is a unique opportunity for people to experience world-class opera in their local community, plus the movie theatre environment and affordable ticket price make these events something that the entire family can enjoy. If you’ve never had the pleasure of attending a live opera performance before, this is the perfect opportunity to see why this magical art form has captured audiences’ imaginations for generations.

In the US, the series was broadcast in both high definition and regular TV as part of the Public Broadcasting Service's Great Performances series under the title Great Performances at the Met. In addition, selected performances were also made viewable online.

=== International expansion ===
The first season included seven theatres in Britain, two in Japan and one in Norway. After its successful launch, several other countries joined for the second season and 100 screens were added, selling an additional 20,000 tickets. These included cinemas in Belgium, France, Germany, Italy, and Spain.

2008 saw the network expand even further to include more screens in the countries named above plus other countries such as Australia, Austria, the Czech Republic, Hungary, Latvia, Lithuania, Luxembourg, the Netherlands, New Zealand, Argentina (Buenos Aires and Mar del Plata), and Poland, as well as the territory of Puerto Rico.

Reaction in the British press has been positive:

...opera is, in fact, managing to find new audiences, all over the world. Down at the Ritzy, my local cinema in Brixton, London, I've been able, since December, to see live broadcasts from the Metropolitan Opera in New York...

The author Peter Conrad praised Gelb's showmanship:

The relays are the brainchild of the Met's new general manager, Peter Gelb, or one of his innumerable brainchildren, part of a campaign both to rejuvenate the Met's audience in New York and to welcome what he calls 'the global opera community' into the fold. When I met Gelb in New York last week, I told him I'd decided that seeing The Barber in Clapham (just south of central London) was actually better than being at the Met. 'Oh no, that's bad,' he groaned. 'We must be doing too good a job.

== Production ==
As of 2011 six Metropolitan Opera employees work full-time on Live in HD. About 40 people work on the technical aspects of each broadcast, with one comparing the scale of the logistics to the preshow coverage of the Emmy or Academy Awards. Host Renée Fleming volunteers her services. No same-day substitution of a major cast member for a Live in HD performance was necessary until January 2010, perhaps because of the appeal of performing for a worldwide audience and the opportunity to appear on the subsequent DVD of the broadcast.

== Audience ==
Movie and radio broadcast revenue increased for the Met from about $5 million in 2006, Live in HD's first year, to $22 million in 2008, with Live in HD contributing the bulk of the growth. For the 2009/10 season, the Met spent about $12 million in production and received about half of the $47 million box-office gross. After paying royalties to its cast and crew, the Met earned a $8 million profit. The Met's Live in HD revenue for the 2012/13 season was $34.5 million.

According to a 2008 study commissioned by Opera America, most Live in HD attendees were "moderate and frequent opera goers". About one in five, however, did not attend a live opera performance in the previous two years, with some being completely new to opera and attending because of curiosity about it. The majority claimed to equally enjoy broadcast and live opera, and more than half stated they would "very likely" attend an opera performance at the Met if visiting New York. A 2011 University of British Columbia thesis found that "Live in HD does not at present cannibalize the local live opera audience ... [but] There is no evidence that [it] generates more live opera attendance or brings new audiences into local opera houses".

A report outlines the economics of the Met's 2013–2014 season:

Last season, 10 operas were transmitted via satellite into at least 2,000 theaters in 66 countries, including more than 800 U.S. theaters. Box office hit $60 million worldwide (average ticket prices were $23 last season), with theater owners splitting sales 50–50 with the Met (insiders say the split is more advantageous to the Met in North America) and Fathom taking a small percentage as well.

Vladica and Davis have utilised Q methodology to analyse audience reactions and judgments of entertainment value with respect to this series, and related cultural events transmitted to cinemas.

By the time the Met began planning for its tenth anniversary season (2015–2016), its Live in HD series had become a major source of income, bringing in $60 million in yearly revenue and $17 to $18 million in profit, 12% of the total for the company. It was being presented in 2,000 theatres in 70 countries and 11 time zones.

== Seasons ==
=== 2006–2007 ===
Beginning on December 30, 2006, as part of the company's effort to build revenues and attract new audiences, the Met broadcast a series of six performances live via satellite into movie theaters. The series was carried in over 100 movie theaters across North America plus others in Britain, Japan and one in Norway. It included:

- Julie Taymor's production of Mozart's The Magic Flute, on December 30, 2006, in an abridged English version conducted by James Levine and starring Ying Huang as Pamina, Matthew Polenzani as Tamino, Jennifer Aylmer as Papagena, and Nathan Gunn as Papageno.
- Bellini's I puritani, on January 6, 2007, starring Anna Netrebko, Eric Cutler and Franco Vassallo in the roles of Elvira, Arturo and Riccardo, in the 1976 Sandro Sequi production conducted by Patrick Summers.
- The world premiere of Tan Dun's The First Emperor, on January 13, 2007, with Plácido Domingo in the title role of Emperor Qin in a production by Zhan Yimou and conducted by Dun himself.
- Tchaikovsky's Eugene Onegin, on February 24, 2007, starring Dmitri Hvorostovsky, Renée Fleming and Ramón Vargas in the roles of Onegin, Tatiana and Lensky in Robert Carsen's simple but beautiful production conducted by Valery Gergiev.
- Rossini's The Barber of Seville, on March 24, 2007, in the new hit production by Bartlett Sher, with Peter Mattei, Joyce DiDonato and Juan Diego Flórez as Figaro, Rosina and Almaviva, and conducted by Maurizio Benini.
- Puccini's Il trittico, on April 28, 2007, in another new hit production, this time by Jack O'Brien and conducted by James Levine. Maria Guleghina, Salvatore Licitra and Juan Pons, in the roles of Giorgetta, Luigi and Michele, sang in Il tabarro, Barbara Frittoli starred in the title role of Suor Angelica, and Gianni Schicchi was played by Alessandro Corbelli with Olga Mykytenko and Massimo Giordano in the roles of Lauretta and Rinuccio. Stephanie Blythe starred in all three operas, singing the roles of Frugola, the Princess and Zita.

In addition, limited repeat showings of the operas were offered in most of the presenting cities. Within the US, digital sound for the performances was provided by Sirius Satellite Radio.

These movie transmissions were successful at the box office as well as having received wide and generally favorable press coverage. The Met reports that 91% of available seats were sold for the HD performances. According to General Manager Peter Gelb, there were 60,000 people in cinemas around the world watching the March 24 transmission of The Barber of Seville. The New York Times reported that 324,000 tickets were sold worldwide for the 2006–07 season, while each simulcast cost $850,000 to $1 million to produce.

If one counts Il trittico as a single work, this is the only Met Live in HD season in which every work broadcast is by a different composer. The Met nearly accomplished this during the 2014–15 season, but swapped Il barbiere di Siviglia in for The Death of Klinghoffer, thus causing a double-up of Rossini operas (as La donna del lago was already scheduled).

=== 2007–2008 ===
Due to the success of the first season, the Metropolitan Opera decided to increase the number of HD broadcasts to movie theaters from six to eight during the 2007–2008 season. Further, the number of available theaters expanded to 330 across the US and additional countries throughout the world.

The first showing on December 15, 2007, Gounod's Roméo et Juliette, was seen on 477 screens and sold an estimated 97,000 tickets. The series continued by featuring seven more of the Met's productions following Roméo et Juliette and ending with La fille du régiment on April 26, 2008.

The Met planned to broadcast to double the number of theaters in the US compared with the previous season, as well as to additional countries. The number of participating venues in the US, which includes movie theatre chains as well as independent theatres and some college campus venues, was 343. While "the scope of the series expands to include more than 700 locations across North America, Europe, Asia, and Australia.... The Met has said that it hopes to reach as many as one million audience members with this season's HD transmissions"

The schedule of live broadcasts included:

- Gounod's Roméo et Juliette (Anna Netrebko, Roberto Alagna, Nathan Gunn, conducted by Plácido Domingo), broadcast on December 15, 2007
- Humperdinck's Hansel and Gretel (Christine Schäfer, Alice Coote, Philip Langridge, conducted by Vladimir Jurowski), broadcast on January 1, 2008
- Verdi's Macbeth (Željko Lučić, Maria Guleghina, John Relyea, conducted by James Levine), broadcast on January 12, 2008
- Puccini's Manon Lescaut (Karita Mattila, Marcello Giordani, Dwayne Croft, conducted by James Levine), broadcast on February 16, 2008
- Britten's Peter Grimes (Anthony Dean Griffey, Patricia Racette, Felicity Palmer, conducted by Donald Runnicles), broadcast on March 15, 2008
- Wagner's Tristan und Isolde (Deborah Voigt, Robert Dean Smith, Matti Salminen, conducted by James Levine), broadcast on March 22, 2008
- Puccini's La bohème (Ramón Vargas, Angela Gheorghiu, Ludovic Tézier, Ainhoa Arteta, conducted by Nicola Luisotti), broadcast on April 5, 2008
- Donizetti's La fille du régiment (Natalie Dessay, Juan Diego Flórez, Alessandro Corbelli, conducted by Marco Armiliato), broadcast on April 26, 2008

By the end of the season, 920,000 people – exceeding the total number of people who attended live performances at the Met over the entire season – attended the 8 screenings bringing in a gross of $13.3 million from North America and $5 million from overseas.

=== 2008–2009 ===
The HD season for 2008–2009 included 11 productions, including the Opening Night Gala on September 22, 2008, (broadcast in North America only).

- Opening Night Gala (Excerpts from La traviata, Manon and Capriccio, starring Renée Fleming), broadcast on September 22, 2008
- Richard Strauss' Salome (Karita Mattila, Kim Begley, Juha Uusitalo, conducted by Patrick Summers), broadcast on October 11, 2008
- John Adams' Doctor Atomic (Gerald Finley, Eric Owens, Sasha Cooke, conducted by Alan Gilbert), broadcast on November 8, 2008
- Berlioz's La damnation de Faust (Marcello Giordani, Susan Graham, John Relyea, conducted by James Levine), broadcast on November 22, 2008
- Massenet's Thaïs (Renée Fleming, Thomas Hampson, Michael Schade, conducted by Jesús López Cobos), broadcast on December 20, 2008
- Puccini's La rondine (Angela Gheorghiu, Roberto Alagna, Samuel Ramey, Lisette Oropesa, Marius Brenciu, conducted by Marco Armiliato), broadcast on January 10, 2009
- Gluck's Orfeo ed Euridice (Stephanie Blythe, Danielle de Niese, Heidi Grant Murphy, conducted by James Levine, broadcast on January 24, 2009
- Donizetti's Lucia di Lammermoor (Anna Netrebko, Piotr Beczała, Mariusz Kwiecień, conducted by Marco Armiliato), broadcast on February 7, 2009
- Puccini's Madama Butterfly (Patricia Racette, Marcello Giordani, Dwayne Croft, conducted by Patrick Summers), broadcast on March 7, 2009
- Bellini's La sonnambula (Natalie Dessay, Juan Diego Flórez, Michele Pertusi, conducted by Evelino Pidò), broadcast on March 21, 2009
- Rossini's La Cenerentola (Elīna Garanča, Lawrence Brownlee, Alessandro Corbelli, conducted by Maurizio Benini), broadcast on May 9, 2009

As of February 2009, over 1.1 million tickets to HD broadcasts had been sold.

=== 2009–2010 ===
- Puccini's Tosca (Karita Mattila, Marcelo Álvarez, George Gagnidze, conducted by Joseph Colaneri), broadcast on October 10, 2009
- Verdi's Aida (Violeta Urmana, Dolora Zajick, Johan Botha, conducted by Daniele Gatti), broadcast on October 24, 2009
- Puccini's Turandot (Maria Guleghina, Marcello Giordani, Marina Poplavskaya, Samuel Ramey, conducted by Andris Nelsons), broadcast on November 7, 2009
- Offenbach's Les Contes d'Hoffmann (Joseph Calleja, Anna Netrebko, Kate Lindsey, Alan Held, conducted by James Levine), broadcast on December 19, 2009
- Richard Strauss' Der Rosenkavalier (Renée Fleming, Susan Graham, Kristinn Sigmundsson, Christine Schäfer, conducted by Edo de Waart), broadcast on January 9, 2010
- Bizet's Carmen (Elīna Garanča, Roberto Alagna, Barbara Frittoli, Teddy Tahu Rhodes, conducted by Yannick Nézet-Séguin), broadcast on January 16, 2010
- Simon Boccanegra (Plácido Domingo, James Morris, Adrianne Pieczonka, Marcello Giordani, conducted by James Levine), broadcast on February 6, 2010
- Thomas' Hamlet (Simon Keenlyside, James Morris, Marlis Petersen, conducted by Louis Langrée), broadcast on March 27, 2010
- Rossini's Armida (Renée Fleming, Lawrence Brownlee, John Osborn, conducted by Riccardo Frizza), broadcast on May 1, 2010

=== 2010–2011 ===
Lucia di Lammermoor became the first opera to receive a repeat HD broadcast, having previously been HD'd during the 2008-09 season.

- Wagner's Das Rheingold (Bryn Terfel, Eric Owens, Stephanie Blythe, Richard Croft, conducted by James Levine), broadcast on October 9, 2010
- Mussorgsky's Boris Godunov (René Pape, Aleksandrs Antonenko, Ekaterina Semenchuk, conducted by Valery Gergiev), broadcast on October 23, 2010
- Donizetti's Don Pasquale (Anna Netrebko, John Del Carlo, Mariusz Kwiecień, Matthew Polenzani, conducted by James Levine), broadcast on November 13, 2010
- Verdi's Don Carlo (Roberto Alagna, Ferruccio Furlanetto, Marina Poplavskaya, Simon Keenlyside, conducted by Yannick Nézet-Séguin), broadcast on December 11, 2010
- Puccini's La fanciulla del West (Deborah Voigt, Marcello Giordani, Lucio Gallo, conducted by Nicola Luisotti), broadcast on January 8, 2011
- John Adams' Nixon in China (James Maddalena, Janis Kelly, Kathleen Kim, conducted by John Adams), broadcast on February 12, 2011
- Gluck's Iphigénie en Tauride (Susan Graham, Plácido Domingo, Paul Groves, conducted by Patrick Summers), broadcast on February 26, 2011
- Donizetti's Lucia di Lammermoor (Natalie Dessay, Joseph Calleja, Ludovic Tézier, conducted by Patrick Summers), broadcast on March 19, 2011
- Rossini's Le comte Ory (Juan Diego Flórez, Joyce DiDonato, Diana Damrau, conducted by Maurizio Benini), broadcast on April 9, 2011
- Richard Strauss' Capriccio (Renée Fleming, Joseph Kaiser, Russell Braun, conducted by Andrew Davis), broadcast on April 23, 2011
- Verdi's Il trovatore (Sondra Radvanovsky, Dmitri Hvorostovsky, Marcelo Álvarez, Dolora Zajick conducted by Marco Armiliato), broadcast on April 30, 2011
- Wagner's Die Walküre (Deborah Voigt, Jonas Kaufmann, Eva-Maria Westbroek, Bryn Terfel, conducted by James Levine), broadcast on May 14, 2011

=== 2011–2012 ===
- Donizetti's Anna Bolena (Anna Netrebko, Ekaterina Gubanova, Ildar Abdrazakov, conducted by Marco Armiliato), broadcast on October 15, 2011
- Mozart's Don Giovanni (Mariusz Kwiecień, Marina Rebeka, Luca Pisaroni, Barbara Frittoli, conducted by Fabio Luisi), broadcast on October 29, 2011
- Wagner's Siegfried (Jay Hunter Morris, Bryn Terfel, Deborah Voigt, conducted by Fabio Luisi), broadcast on November 5, 2011
- Glass' Satyagraha (Richard Croft, Maria Zifchak, Rachelle Durkin, conducted by Dante Anzolini), broadcast on November 19, 2011
- Handel's Rodelinda (Renée Fleming, Andreas Scholl, Stephanie Blythe, conducted by Harry Bicket), broadcast on December 3, 2011
- Gounod's Faust (Jonas Kaufmann, René Pape, Marina Poplavskaya, conducted by Yannick Nézet-Séguin), broadcast on December 10, 2011
- Baroque pasticheThe Enchanted Island (David Daniels, Joyce DiDonato, Danielle de Niese, Plácido Domingo, Lisette Oropesa, Anthony Roth Costanzo, conducted by William Christie), broadcast on January 21, 2012
- Wagner's Götterdämmerung (Deborah Voigt, Jay Hunter Morris, Waltraud Meier, conducted by Fabio Luisi), broadcast on February 11, 2012
- Verdi's Ernani (Angela Meade, Marcello Giordani, Dmitri Hvorostovsky, Ferruccio Furlanetto, conducted by Marco Armiliato), broadcast on February 25, 2012
- Massenet's Manon (Anna Netrebko, Piotr Beczała, Paulo Szot, conducted by Fabio Luisi), broadcast on April 7, 2012
- Verdi's La traviata (Natalie Dessay, Matthew Polenzani, Dmitri Hvorostovsky, conducted by Fabio Luisi), broadcast on April 14, 2012

=== 2012–2013 ===
- Donizetti's L'elisir d'amore (Anna Netrebko, Matthew Polenzani, Mariusz Kwiecień, Ambrogio Maestri, conducted by Maurizio Benini), broadcast on October 13, 2012
- Verdi's Otello (Johan Botha, Renée Fleming, Falk Struckmann, conducted by Semyon Bychkov), broadcast on October 27, 2012
- Adès' The Tempest (Simon Keenlyside, Isabel Leonard, Audrey Luna, conducted by Thomas Adès), broadcast on November 10, 2012
- Mozart's La clemenza di Tito (Elīna Garanča, Barbara Frittoli, Giuseppe Filianoti, conducted by Harry Bicket), broadcast on December 1, 2012
- Verdi's Un ballo in maschera (Marcelo Álvarez, Sondra Radvanovsky, Dmitri Hvorostovsky, Kathleen Kim, Stephanie Blythe, conducted by Fabio Luisi), broadcast on December 8, 2012
- Verdi's Aida (Liudmyla Monastyrska, Roberto Alagna, Olga Borodina, conducted by Fabio Luisi), broadcast on December 15, 2012
- Berlioz's Les Troyens (Bryan Hymel, Susan Graham, Deborah Voigt, conducted by Fabio Luisi), broadcast on January 5, 2013
- Donizetti's Maria Stuarda (Joyce DiDonato, Elza van den Heever, Matthew Polenzani, conducted by Maurizio Benini, broadcast on January 19, 2013
- Verdi's Rigoletto (Željko Lučić, Diana Damrau, Piotr Beczała, conducted by Michele Mariotti), broadcast on February 16, 2013
- Wagner's Parsifal (Jonas Kaufmann, René Pape, Peter Mattei, Katarina Dalayman, conducted by Daniele Gatti), broadcast on March 2, 2013
- Zandonai's Francesca da Rimini (Eva-Maria Westbroek, Marcello Giordani, Mark Delavan, conducted by Marco Armiliato), broadcast on March 16, 2013
- Handel's Giulio Cesare (Natalie Dessay, David Daniels, Alice Coote, conducted by Harry Bicket), broadcast on April 27, 2013

=== 2013–2014 ===
- Tchaikovsky's Eugene Onegin (Anna Netrebko, Mariusz Kwiecień, Piotr Beczała, conducted by Valery Gergiev), broadcast on October 5, 2013
- Shostakovich's The Nose (Paulo Szot, Andrey Popov, Alexander Lewis, conducted by Pavel Smelkov), broadcast on October 26, 2013
- Puccini's Tosca (Patricia Racette, Roberto Alagna, George Gagnidze, conducted by Riccardo Frizza), broadcast on November 9, 2013
- Verdi's Falstaff (Ambrogio Maestri, Angela Meade, Stephanie Blythe conducted by James Levine), broadcast on December 14, 2013
- Dvorák's Rusalka (Renée Fleming, Dolora Zajick, Piotr Beczała, conducted by Yannick Nézet-Séguin), broadcast on February 8, 2014
- Borodin's Prince Igor (Ildar Abdrazakov, Oksana Dyka, Anita Rachvelishvili, conducted by Gianandrea Noseda), broadcast on March 1, 2014
- Massenet's Werther (Jonas Kaufmann, Sophie Koch, David Bižić, Lisette Oropesa, conducted by Alain Altinoglu), broadcast on March 15, 2014
- Puccini's La bohème (Kristīne Opolais, Vittorio Grigolo, Susanna Phillips, conducted by Stefano Ranzani), broadcast on April 5, 2014
- Mozart's Così fan tutte (Susanna Phillips, Danielle de Niese, Matthew Polenzani, Isabel Leonard, Rodion Pogossov, Maurizio Muraro, conducted by James Levine), broadcast on April 26, 2014
- Rossini's La Cenerentola (Joyce DiDonato, Juan Diego Flórez, Luca Pisaroni, conducted by Fabio Luisi), broadcast on May 10, 2014

=== 2014–2015 ===
The 2014–2015 season presented 12 operas in 10 HD transmissions, including (for the first time in the series) two "double-bills" where two short operas were staged together on the same program. John Adams's The Death of Klinghoffer was originally planned for an HD transmission but was replaced by Il barbiere di Siviglia due to controversy after the work was accused of being anti-Semitic. The 2014–15 season is the most recent season in which more of the operas being broadcast were first-time Live in HD broadcasts (8 operas in 6 broadcasts) than repeat broadcasts (4 operas in as many broadcasts); all seasons since then have either had equal numbers or more operas getting repeat broadcasts.

- Macbeth (Željko Lučić, Anna Netrebko, Joseph Calleja, René Pape, conducted by Fabio Luisi), broadcast on October 11, 2014
- Le nozze di Figaro (Ildar Abdrazakov, Marlis Petersen, Peter Mattei, conducted by James Levine), broadcast on October 18, 2014
- Carmen (Anita Rachvelishvili, Aleksandrs Antonenko, Anita Hartig, Ildar Abdrazakov, conducted by Pablo Heras-Casado), broadcast on November 1, 2014
- Il barbiere di Siviglia (Isabel Leonard, Lawrence Brownlee, Christopher Maltman, conducted by Michele Mariotti), broadcast on November 22, 2014
- Die Meistersinger von Nürnberg (Michael Volle, Johan Botha, Annette Dasch, conducted by James Levine), broadcast on December 13, 2014
- The Merry Widow (Renée Fleming, Nathan Gunn, Kelli O'Hara, Thomas Allen conducted by Andrew Davis), broadcast on January 17, 2015
- Les contes d'Hoffmann (Vittorio Grigolo, Hibla Gerzmava, Thomas Hampson, Kate Lindsey conducted by Yves Abel), broadcast on January 31, 2015
- Iolanta and Duke Bluebeard's Castle (Anna Netrebko, Piotr Beczała, Nadja Michael, Mikhail Petrenko, conducted by Valery Gergiev), broadcast on February 14, 2015
- La donna del lago (Joyce DiDonato, Juan Diego Flórez, Daniela Barcellona, conducted by Michele Mariotti), broadcast on March 14, 2015
- Cavalleria rusticana and Pagliacci (Marcelo Álvarez, Eva-Maria Westbroek, Patricia Racette, conducted by Fabio Luisi), broadcast on April 25, 2015

=== 2015–2016 ===
- Il trovatore (Anna Netrebko, Yonghoon Lee, Dmitri Hvorostovsky, Dolora Zajick, conducted by Marco Armiliato), broadcast on October 3, 2015
- Otello (Aleksandrs Antoņenko, Sonya Yoncheva, Željko Lučić, conducted by Yannick Nézet-Séguin), broadcast on October 17, 2015
- Tannhäuser (Johan Botha, Eva-Maria Westbroek, Peter Mattei, Michelle DeYoung, conducted by James Levine), broadcast on October 31, 2015
- Lulu (Marlis Petersen, Susan Graham, Johan Reuter, conducted by Lothar Koenigs), broadcast on November 21, 2015
- Les pêcheurs de perles (Matthew Polenzani, Diana Damrau, Mariusz Kwiecień, conducted by Gianandrea Noseda), broadcast on January 16, 2016
- Turandot (Nina Stemme, Marco Berti, Anita Hartig, conducted by Paolo Carignani), broadcast on January 30, 2016
- Manon Lescaut (Kristīne Opolais, Roberto Alagna, Massimo Cavalletti, conducted by Fabio Luisi), broadcast on March 5, 2016
- Madama Butterfly (Kristīne Opolais, Roberto Alagna, Dwayne Croft, conducted by Karel Mark Chichon), broadcast on April 2, 2016
- Roberto Devereux (Sondra Radvanovsky, Matthew Polenzani, Elīna Garanča, Mariusz Kwiecień, conducted by Maurizio Benini), broadcast on April 16, 2016
- Elektra (Nina Stemme, Waltraud Meier, Adrianne Pieczonka, Eric Owens, conducted by Esa-Pekka Salonen), broadcast on April 30, 2016

=== 2016–2017 ===
The 2016–2017 season included the presentation of the first opera by a female composer in the series, L'Amour de loin of Kaija Saariaho, which also marked the first opera in the series to feature a female conductor, Susanna Mälkki. The presentation of Der Rosenkavalier marked the final performances in their respective roles by Renée Fleming (the Marschallin) and Elīna Garanča (Octavian).

- Tristan und Isolde (Nina Stemme, Stuart Skelton, Ekaterina Gubanova, René Pape, conducted by Sir Simon Rattle), broadcast on October 8, 2016
- Don Giovanni (Simon Keenlyside, Hibla Gerzmava, Malin Byström, Paul Appleby, Adam Plachetka conducted by Fabio Luisi), broadcast on October 22, 2016
- L'Amour de loin (Eric Owens, Susanna Phillips, Tamara Mumford, conducted by Susanna Mälkki), broadcast on December 10, 2016
- Nabucco (Plácido Domingo, Liudmyla Monastyrska, Dimitry Belosselskiy, Jamie Barton, conducted by James Levine), broadcast on January 7, 2017
- Roméo et Juliette (Diana Damrau, Vittorio Grigolo, Mikhail Petrenko, Elliot Madore, Virginie Verrez, conducted by Gianndrea Noseda), broadcast on January 21, 2017
- Rusalka (Kristīne Opolais, Brandon Jovanovich, Jamie Barton, Eric Owens, Katarina Dalayman, conducted by Mark Elder), broadcast on February 25, 2017
- La traviata (Sonya Yoncheva, Michael Fabiano, Thomas Hampson, conducted by Nicola Luisotti), broadcast on March 11, 2017
- Idomeneo (Matthew Polenzani, Alice Coote, Elza van den Heever, Nadine Sierra, conducted by James Levine), broadcast on March 25, 2017
- Eugene Onegin (Anna Netrebko, Peter Mattei, Alexy Dolgov, Štefan Kocán, conducted by Robin Ticciati), broadcast on April 22, 2017
- Der Rosenkavalier (Renée Fleming, Elīna Garanča, Erin Morley, Günther Groissböck, conducted by Sebastian Weigle), broadcast on May 13, 2017

=== 2017–2018 ===
- Norma (Sondra Radvanovsky, Joyce DiDonato, Joseph Calleja, Matthew Rose, conducted by Carlo Rizzi), broadcast on October 7, 2017
- Die Zauberflöte (Golda Schultz, Kathryn Lewek, Charles Castronovo, Markus Werba, René Pape, conducted by James Levine), broadcast on October 14, 2017
- The Exterminating Angel (Sally Matthews, Alice Coote, Christine Rice, Iestyn Davies, Rod Gilfry, John Tomlinson, Amanda Echalaz, conducted by Thomas Adès), broadcast on November 18, 2017
- Tosca (Sonya Yoncheva, Vittorio Grigolo, Željko Lučić, conducted by Emmanuel Villaume), broadcast on January 27, 2018
- L'elisir d'amore (Pretty Yende, Matthew Polenzani, Ildebrando D'Arcangelo, Davide Luciano, conducted by Domingo Hindoyan), broadcast on February 10, 2018
- La bohème (Sonya Yoncheva, Susanna Phillips, Michael Fabiano, Lucas Meachem, conducted by Marco Armiliato), broadcast on February 24, 2018
- Semiramide (Angela Meade, Elizabeth DeShong, Javier Camarena, Ildar Abdrazakov, conducted by Maurizio Benini), broadcast on March 10, 2018
- Così fan tutte (Kelli O'Hara, Amanda Majeski, Serena Malfi, Ben Bliss, Adam Plachetka, Christopher Maltman, conducted by David Robertson), broadcast on March 31, 2018
- Luisa Miller (Sonya Yoncheva, Olesya Petrova, Piotr Beczała, Plácido Domingo, conducted by Bertrand de Billy), broadcast on April 14, 2018
- Cendrillon (Joyce DiDonato, Alice Coote, Stephanie Blythe, Kathleen Kim, conducted by Bertrand de Billy), broadcast on April 28, 2018

=== 2018–2019 ===
- Aida (Anna Netrebko, Anita Rachvelishvili, Aleksandrs Antoņenko, Quinn Kelsey, conducted by Nicola Luisotti), broadcast on October 6, 2018
- Samson et Dalila (Elīna Garanča, Roberto Alagna, Laurent Naouri, Dmitry Belosselskiy, conducted by Mark Elder), broadcast on October 20, 2018
- La fanciulla del West (Eva-Maria Westbroek, Jonas Kaufmann, Željko Lučić, Carlo Bosi, conducted by Marco Armiliato), broadcast on October 27, 2018
- Marnie (Isabel Leonard, Christopher Maltman, Denyce Graves, Iestyn Davies, Janis Kelly, conducted by Robert Spano), broadcast on November 10, 2018
- La traviata (Diana Damrau, Juan Diego Flórez, Quinn Kelsey, conducted by Yannick Nézet-Séguin), broadcast on December 15, 2018
- Adriana Lecouvreur (Anna Netrebko, Piotr Beczała, Anita Rachvelishvili, Ambrogio Maestri, conducted by Gianandrea Noseda), broadcast on January 12, 2019
- Carmen (Clémentine Margaine, Roberto Alagna, Aleksandra Kurzak, Alexander Vinogradov, conducted by Louis Langrée), broadcast on February 2, 2019
- La fille du régiment (Pretty Yende, Javier Camarena, Stephanie Blythe, Maurizio Muraro, Kathleen Turner, conducted by Enrique Mazzola), broadcast on March 2, 2019
- Die Walküre (Christine Goerke, Eva-Maria Westbroek, Stuart Skelton, Greer Grimsley, Jamie Barton, conducted by Philippe Jordan), broadcast on March 30, 2019
- Dialogues des Carmélites (Isabel Leonard, Adrianne Pieczonka, Karita Mattila, Karen Cargill, conducted by Yannick Nézet-Séguin), broadcast on May 11, 2019

=== 2019–2020 (abbreviated) ===
The final three performances were cancelled due to the COVID-19 pandemic.

- Turandot (Christine Goerke, Yusif Eyvazov, Eleonora Buratto, James Morris, conducted by Yannick Nézet-Séguin) broadcast on October 12, 2019
- Manon (Lisette Oropesa, Michael Fabiano, Artur Ruciński, Carlo Bosi, conducted by Maurizio Benini), broadcast on October 26, 2019
- Madama Butterfly (Hui He, Elizabeth DeShong, Bruce Sledge, Paulo Szot, conducted by Pier Giorgio Morandi), broadcast on November 9, 2019
- Akhnaten (Anthony Roth Costanzo, J'Nai Bridges, Dísella Lárusdóttir, Aaron Blake, Zachary James, conducted by Karen Kamensek), broadcast on November 23, 2019
- Wozzeck (Peter Mattei, Elza van den Heever, Gerhard Siegel, Christian Van Horn, conducted by Yannick Nézet-Séguin), broadcast on January 11, 2020
- Porgy and Bess (Eric Owens, Angel Blue, Denyce Graves, Latonia Moore, Frederick Ballentine, Alfred Walker, Golda Schultz, conducted by David Robertson), broadcast on February 1, 2020
- Agrippina (Joyce DiDonato, Brenda Rae, Kate Lindsey, Iestyn Davies, Matthew Rose, conducted by Harry Bicket), broadcast on February 29, 2020,

The following broadcasts were scheduled, but cancelled due to the COVID-19 pandemic:

- Der fliegende Holländer (Evgeny Nikitin, Anja Kampe, Sergey Skorokhodov, Franz-Josef Selig, conducted by Valery Gergiev). Originally scheduled for March 14, 2020, the Live-in-HD performance was cancelled, but a video recording prepared from rehearsal tapes of earlier performances was telecast on July 5, 2020, as part of the PBS Great Performances series and is available for streaming at Met Opera on Demand.
- Tosca (Anna Netrebko, Brian Jagde, Michael Volle, conducted by Bertrand de Billy), originally scheduled for April 11, 2020
- Maria Stuarda (Diana Damrau, Jamie Barton, Stephen Costello, Michele Pertusi, conducted by Maurizio Benini), originally scheduled for May 9, 2020

=== 2020–2021 (cancelled) ===
Due to the COVID-19 pandemic the Met was forced to cancel its entire 2020–2021 season. The following performances were scheduled to be broadcast:

- Aida (Anna Netrebko, Piotr Beczała, Anita Rachvelishvili, Ludovic Tézier, conducted by Yannick Nézet-Séguin)
- Il Trovatore (Sonya Yoncheva, Ekaterina Semenchuk, Roberto Aronica, Quinn Kelsey, conducted by Michele Mariotti)
- Fidelio (Lise Davidsen, Brandon Jovanovich, Franz-Josef Selig, Tomasz Konieczny, Golda Schultz, conducted by Yannick Nézet-Séguin)
- Die Zauberflöte (Christiane Karg, Stanislas de Barbeyrac, Thomas Oliemans, Kathryn Lewek, Stephan Milling, conducted by Gustavo Dudamel)
- Roméo et Juliette (Nadine Sierra, Stephen Costello, Joshua Hopkins, Julie Boulianne, Ildar Abdrazakov, conducted by Yannick Nézet-Séguin)
- Don Giovanni (Peter Mattei, Gerald Finley, Ailyn Pérez, Isabel Leonard, Ben Bliss, conducted by Yannick Nézet-Séguin)
- Dead Man Walking (Joyce DiDonato, Étienne Dupuis, Susan Graham, Latonia Moore, conducted by Yannick Nézet-Séguin)
- Die Frau ohne Schatten (Elza van den Heever, Nina Stemme, Evelyn Herlitzius, Klaus Florian Vogt, Michael Volle, conducted by Yannick Nézet-Séguin)
- Nabucco (George Gagnidze, Anna Netrebko, Dmitry Belosselskiy, Varduhi Abrahamyan, Najmiddin Mavlyanov, conducted by Marco Armiliato)
- Il Pirata (Diana Damrau, Javier Camarena, Nicolas Testé, conducted by Maurizio Benini)

=== 2021–2022 ===
- Boris Godunov (René Pape, David Butt Philip, Ain Anger, Maxim Paster, Aleksey Bogdanov, conducted by Sebastian Weigle), broadcast on October 9, 2021
- Fire Shut Up in My Bones (Will Liverman, Angel Blue, Latonia Moore, Ryan Speedo Green, conducted by Yannick Nézet-Séguin), broadcast on October 23, 2021
- Eurydice (Erin Morley, Joshua Hopkins, Jakub Józef Orliński, Barry Banks, Nathan Berg, conducted by Yannick Nézet-Séguin), broadcast on December 4, 2021
- Cinderella (Isabel Leonard, Stephanie Blythe, Emily D'Angelo, Jessica Pratt, Laurent Naouri, conducted by Emmanuel Villaume), broadcast on January 1, 2022
- Rigoletto (Quinn Kelsey, Piotr Beczala, Rosa Feola, Andrea Mastroni, Varduhi Abrahamyan, conducted by Daniele Rustioni), broadcast on January 29, 2022
- Ariadne auf Naxos (Lise Davidsen, Brenda Rae, Isabel Leonard, Brandon Jovanovich, Johannes Martin Kränzle, Sean Michael Plumb, Wolfgang Brendel, conducted by Marek Janowski), broadcast on March 12, 2022
- Don Carlos (Matthew Polenzani, Sonya Yoncheva, Jamie Barton, Étienne Dupuis, Eric Owens, John Relyea, conducted by Patrick Furrer), broadcast on March 26, 2022
- Turandot (Liudmyla Monastyrska, Yonghoon Lee, Ermonela Jaho, Ferruccio Furlanetto conducted by Marco Armiliato), broadcast on May 7, 2022
- Lucia di Lammermoor (Nadine Sierra, Javier Camarena, Artur Rucinski, Christian Van Horn, conducted by Riccardo Frizza), broadcast on May 21, 2022
- Hamlet (composed by Brett Dean) (Allan Clayton, Brenda Rae, Rod Gilfry, Sarah Connelly, Sir John Tomlinson, Willian Burden, Jacques Imbrailo, conducted by Nicholas Carter), broadcast on June 4, 2022

=== 2022–2023 ===
The season was originally scheduled to include a broadcast of Don Carlo in a four-act Italian version on November 19, 2022. It was removed from the schedule and replaced with Falstaff following the firing of Anna Netrebko from the Don Carlo revival. This is the second time that an HD broadcast has been replaced, after the replacement of The Death of Klinghoffer in 2014.

- Medea (Sondra Radvanovsky, Matthew Polenzani, Janai Brugger, Michele Pertusi, conducted by Carlo Rizzi), broadcast on October 22, 2022.
- La Traviata (Nadine Sierra, Stephen Costello, Luca Salsi, conducted by Daniele Callegari) broadcast on November 5, 2022
- The Hours (Renée Fleming, Kelli O'Hara, Joyce DiDonato, Denyce Graves, William Burden, Kyle Ketelsen, conducted by Yannick Nézet-Séguin) broadcast on December 10, 2022
- Fedora (Sonya Yoncheva, Piotr Beczala, Rosa Feola, Lucas Meachem, conducted by Marco Armiliato, broadcast January 14, 2023
- Lohengrin (Piotr Beczala, Tamara Wilson, Christine Goerke, Evgeny Nikitin, Günther Groissböck, Brian Mulligan, conducted by Yannick Nézet-Séguin), broadcast March 18, 2023
- Falstaff (Michael Volle, Ailyn Pérez, Christopher Maltman, Hera Hyesang Park, Marie-Nicole Lemieux, Bogdan Volkov, Jennifer Johnson Cano, conducted by Daniele Rustioni) broadcast on April 1, 2023
- Der Rosenkavalier (Lise Davidsen, Samantha Hankey, Erin Morley, Günther Groissböck, conducted by Simone Young) broadcast April 15, 2023
- Champion (Eric Owens, Ryan Speedo Green, Latonia Moore, Stephanie Blythe) conducted by Yannick Nézet-Séguin), broadcast April 29, 2023.
- Don Giovanni (Peter Mattei, Adam Plachetka, Federica Lombardi, Ana María Martínez, Ying Fang, Ben Bliss, conducted by Nathalie Stutzmann) broadcast May 20, 2023
- Die Zauberflöte (Lawrence Brownlee, Erin Morley, Kathryn Lewek, Thomas Oliemans, Stephen Milling, conducted by Nathalie Stutzmann), broadcast June 3, 2023

=== 2023–2024 ===
- Dead Man Walking (Joyce DiDonato, Susan Graham, Ryan McKinny, Latonia Moore, conducted by Yannick Nézet-Séguin) broadcast on October 21, 2023
- X, The Life and Times of Malcolm X (Will Liverman, Leah Hawkins, Raehann Bryce-Davis, Victor Ryan Robertson, Michael Sumuel, conducted by Kazem Abdullah) broadcast November 18, 2023
- Florencia en el Amazonas (Ailyn Pérez, Mattia Olivieri, Gabriella Reyes, Mario Chang, Nancy Fabiola Herrera, Michael Chioldi, Greer Grimsley, conducted by Yannick Nézet-Séguin) broadcast December 9, 2023
- Nabucco (Liudmyla Monastyrska, George Gagnidze, SeokJong Baek, Dmitry Belosselskiy, Maria Barakova, conducted by Daniele Callegari) broadcast January 6, 2024
- Carmen (Aigul Akhmetshina, Piotr Beczala, Angel Blue, Kyle Ketelsen, conducted by Daniele Rustioni broadcast January 27, 2024
- La Forza del Destino (Lise Davidsen, Brian Jagde, Igor Golovatenko, Soloman Howard, Judit Kutasi, conducted by Yannick Nézet-Séguin) broadcast March 9, 2024
- Roméo et Juliette (Nadine Sierra, Benjamin Bernheim, Will Liverman, Samantha Hankey, Alfred Walker, conducted by Yannick Nézet-Séguin) broadcast March 23, 2024
- La Rondine (Angel Blue, Jonathan Tetelman, Emily Pogorelc, Bekhzod Davronov, conducted by Speranza Scappucci) broadcast April 20, 2024
- Madama Butterfly (Asmik Grigorian, Jonathan Tetelman, Lucas Meachem, Elizabeth DeShong, conducted by Xian Zhang) broadcast May 11, 2024

=== 2024–2025 ===
- Les Contes d'Hoffmann (Benjamin Bernheim, Christian Van Horn, Erin Morley, Pretty Yende, Clémentine Margaine, Vasilisa Berzhanskaya, conducted by Marco Armiliato) broadcast October 5, 2024
- Grounded (Emily D'Angelo, Ellie Dehn, Ben Bliss, Kyle Miller, Greer Grimsley, conducted by Yannick Nézet-Séguin) broadcast October 19, 2024
- Tosca (Lise Davidsen, Freddie De Tommaso, Quinn Kelsey, Patrick Carfizzi, conducted by Yannick Nézet-Séguin) broadcast November 23, 2024
- Aida (Angel Blue, Piotr Beczala, Judit Kutasi, Quinn Kelsey, Morris Robinson, conducted by Yannick Nézet-Séguin) broadcast Jan 25, 2025
- Fidelio (Lise Davidsen, David Butt Philip, René Pape, Tomasz Konieczny, Ying Fang, conducted by Susanna Mälkki) to be broadcast March 15, 2025
- Le Nozze di Figaro (Michael Sumuel, Olga Kulchynska, Federica Lombardi, Joshua Hopkins, Marianne Crebassa, conducted by Joana Mallwitz) to be broadcast April 26, 2025
- Salome (Elza van den Heever, Peter Mattei, Gerhard Siegel, Michelle DeYoung, Piotr Buzweski, conducted by Yannick Nézet-Séguin) to be broadcast May 17, 2025
- Il Barbiere di Siviglia (Aigul Akhmetshina, Jack Swanson, Andrey Zhilikhovsky, Peter Káláman, Alexander Vinogradov, conducted by Giacomo Sagripanti) broadcast May 31, 2025

=== 2025–2026 ===
- La Sonnambula (Nadine Sierra, Xabier Anduaga, Alexander Vinogradov, Sydney Manscasola, conducted by Riccardo Frizza) broadcast October 18, 2025
- La Boheme (Juliana Grigoryan, Freddie De Tommaso, Heidi Stober, Lucas Meachem, Jongmin Park, Iurii Samoilov, conducted by Keri-Lynn Wilson), broadcast November 8, 2025
- Arabella (Rachel Willis-Sørensen, Tomasz Konieczny, Louisa Alder, Pavol Breslik, Brindley Sherratt, conducted by Nicholas Carter) broadcast November 22, 2025
- Andrea Chenier (Piotr Beczala, Sonya Yoncheva, Igor Golovatenko, Conducted by Daniele Rustioni) broadcast December 13, 2025
- I Puritani (Lisette Oropesa, Lawrence Brownlee, Ricardo José Rivera, Christian Van Horn, conducted by Marco Armiliato) broadcast January 10, 2026
- The Amazing Adventures of Kavalier & Clay (Andrzej Filończyk, Miles Mykkanen, Sun-Ly Pierce, Edward Nelson, Lauren Snouffer, Patrick Carfizzi, Craig Colclough, conducted by Yannick Nézet-Séguin), recorded live on October 2, 2025, broadcast January 24, 2026
- Tristan und Isolde (Lise Davidsen, Michael Spyres, Ekaterina Gubanova, Ryan Speedo Green, Tomasz Konieczny, conducted by Yannick Nézet-Séguin) to be broadcast March 21, 2026
- Eugene Onegin (Iurii Samoilov, Asmik Grigorian, Stanislas de Barbeyrac, Alexander Tsymbalyuk, Stephanie Blythe, conducted by Timur Zangiev) to be broadcast May 2, 2026
- El Último Sueño de Frida y Diego (Isabel Leonard, Carlos Álvarez, Nils Wanderer, Gabriella Reyes, conducted by Yannick Nézet-Séguin) to be broadcast May 30, 2026

=== 2026–2027 ===
- Twenty Years of the Met in Cinemas: An Anniversary Celebration, to be broadcast September 19th, 2026. A special anniversary selection of highlights from past broadcasts hosted by Renée Fleming
- Cosi Fan Tutte (Federica Lombardi, Samantha Hankey, Ana Maria Martinez, Duke Kim, Andrey Zhilikhovsky, Gerald Finley, conducted by Nimrod David Pfeffer) to be broadcast October 3rd, 2026
- Macbeth (Lise Davidsen, Quinn Kelsey, Freddie De Tommaso, Ryan Speedo Green, conducted by Yannick Nézet-Séguin) to be broadcast October 17, 2026
- Samson et Dalila (Clay Hilley, Aigul Akhmetshina, Quinn Kelsey, Morris Robinson, Alfred Walker, conducted by Giacomo Sagripanti) to be broadcast December 5th, 2026
- La Fanciulla del West (Sondra Radvanovsky, SeokJong Baek, Christopher Maltman, conducted by Keri-Lynn Wilson), to be broadcast January 23rd, 2027
- Silent Night (Elza van den Heever, Ben Bliss, Rolando Villazon, Ryan McKinny, Mattia Olivieri, Ben Reisinger, Kyle Ketelsen, conducted by Dalia Stasevska) to be broadcast March 20, 2027
- Manon (Nadine Sierra, Matthew Polenzani, Andrzej Filonczyk, Rod Gilfry, Jean Teitgen, Carlo Bosi, conducted by Yves Abel), to be broadcast April 3rd, 2027
- Otello (Brian Jagde, Ailyn Perez, Artur Rucinski, Piotr Buszewsi, Deborah Nansteel, Vitalij Kowaljow, conducted by Michele Mariotti), to be broadcast April 24, 2027
- Parsifal (Piotr Beczala, Elina Garanca, Peter Mattei, Ryan Speedo Green, Jongmin Park, Alfred Walker, conducted by Yannick Nézet-Séguin), to be broadcast June 5, 2027
