= Elza van den Heever =

South African operatic soprano (born 1979)

- Born: 1979 (age 46–47); Johannesburg, South Africa
- Education: San Francisco Conservatory
- Occupation: Operatic soprano
- Website: elzavandenheever.com

Elza van den Heever (born 1979) is a South African soprano in opera and concert, who began her career as a mezzo-soprano. She has appeared in leading roles at major houses and concert halls of the world. One of her signature roles is Elisabetta in Donizetti's Maria Stuarda, which she performed for her debut at the Metropolitan Opera in 2012 and subsequently recorded live. In the 2020s she turned to roles by R. Strauss such as Salome, and Wagner's Sieglinde in Die Walküre.

== Career ==
Born in Johannesburg as one of triplets, the daughter of a filmmaker and an actress, van den Heever was first trained as a mezzo-soprano, studying from age 18 at the San Francisco Conservatory of Music. She was part of the Merola Opera Program and the San Francisco Opera's Adler Fellowship, creating the role of Mary Custis Lee in Appomattox by Philip Glass, conducted by Dennis Russell Davies. In a transition process of five years, she learned new vocal technique and new roles. Her first major soprano role was Donna Anna in Mozart's Don Giovanni, stepping in at the San Francisco Opera in 2007. In 2008, she appeared as Giorgetta in Puccini's Il tabarro at the Oper Frankfurt, conducted by Nicola Luisotti. She recorded the role in a 2010 concert performance from the Konzerthaus in Vienna, conducted by Bertrand de Billy, with the Vienna Radio Symphony Orchestra, alongside Johan Botha as Luigi and Wolfgang Koch as Michele. Her interpretation was described as exciting, with feminine glow in the high register, velvety timbre in the middle range, and an impeccable technique ("mit fraulich leuchtenden Höhen, samtig timbrierter Mittellage und einer untadeligen Technik". Performing also at the Lyric Opera of Chicago and in Paris, she appeared at the Bavarian State Opera in Munich in 2011 as Elsa in Wagner's Lohengrin, and in 2013 as Donna Anna.

She made her debut with the Metropolitan Opera in New York City in 2012 as Elisabetta in Donizetti's Maria Stuarda, in the opera's first production at the house, broadcast live and recorded. She sang alongside Joyce DiDonato in the title role and Matthew Polenzani as Leicester, staged by David McVicar and conducted by Maurizio Benini. To appear convincing as the wig-bearing bald queen in the close-ups of the broadcast, in a production with rich historic costumes, she had her head shaved. In 2015, she first appeared in the title role of Bellini's Norma at the Bordeaux Opera. In 2016 she returned to the Oper Frankfurt, singing Giorgetta again in the production of Il trittico by Claus Guth and conducted by Jakub Hrůša, alongside Zeljko Lucic as Michele and Vincent Wolfsteiner as Luigi, and also the title role of Puccini's Suor Angelica. She sang the title role of Salome by R. Strauss at the Metropolitan Opera in the 2024–25 season, in a new production by Guth, as well as the Empress in Die Frau ohne Schatten. She made her debut at the Bayreuth Festival in the summer of 2025 as Elsa in Lohengrin. She has also added the role of Sieglinde in Die Walküre to her Wagnerian repertoire, performing it at La Scala in Milan in the 2024/25 season, the Paris Opera in the 2025/26 season, and scheduled at the Bayreuth Festival in the summer of 2026. She is scheduled to make her role debut as Puccini's Turandot at Oper Frankfurt in 2026.

In August 2026 she sang Salome at the BBC Proms, notably forgetting the words of Strauss' "Zueignung" in her encore.

== Awards ==
She was a winner of the 2008 Seattle Opera Wagner Competition and the 2022 Opera News Award.

== Discography ==
- Strauss, Richard; Goerke, Christine; Van den Heever, Elza; Schuster, Michaela; Morris, Jay Hunter; Petrenko, Mikhail; Nézet-Séguin, Yannick; Metropolitan Opera (New York, N.Y.) (2018), Elektra (in German), [New York, New York]: [Metropolitan Opera], OCLC 1056624215
- Mozart, Wolfgang Amadeus; Sierra, Nadine; Van den Heever, Elza; Coote, Alice; Polenzani, Matthew; Levine, James; Pierre-Ponnelle, Jean; Metropolitan Opera (New York, N.Y.) (2017), Idomeneo (in Italian), [New York, New York]: [Metropolitan Opera], OCLC 1018379673
- Puccini, Giacomo; Adami, Giuseppe; Botha, Johan; Koch, Wolfgang; Heever, Elza van den; Brunner, Heidi; Billy, Bertrand de; Wiener Singakademie; Radio-Symphonieorchester Wien (2018), Il tabarro : opera in un atto (in Italian), Vienna: Capriccio, OCLC 1035447337
- Mahler, Gustav; Goethe, Johann Wolfgang von; Wall, Erin; Van den Heever, Elza; Claycomb, Laura; Karnéus, Katarina; Naef, Yvonne; Griffey, Anthony Dean; Kelsey, Quinn; Morris, James; Tilson Thomas, Michael; San Francisco Symphony Chorus; Pacific Boychoir; San Francisco Girls Chorus; San Francisco Symphony Orchestra (2009), Symphony no. 8; Adagio from Symphony no. 10 (in German), San Francisco: San Francisco Symphony, OCLC 434891014

=== Video ===
- Donizetti, Gaetano; Benini, Maurizio; DiDonato, Joyce; Heever, Elza; Hopkins, Joshua; McVicar, David; Polenzani, Matthew; Rose, Matthew; Metropolitan Opera Chorus; Metropolitan Opera Orchestra (2014), Maria Stuarda, [Erscheinungsort nicht ermittelbar]: Erato/Warner Classics, Warner Music, OCLC 1246183247
