= Pier Giorgio Morandi =

Italian oboist and conductor (born 1958)

- Born: 1958 (age 66–67); Biella, Italy
- Occupations: Oboist; Conductor
- Organizations: Teatro dell'Opera di Roma; Hungarian State Opera House; Royal Swedish Opera

Pier Giorgio Morandi (born 1958) is an Italian oboist and conductor, especially of Italian opera of the 19th and early 20th century, who has worked internationally. After having played as principal oboe at La Scala in Milan, he turned to conducting, holding positions at the Teatro dell'Opera di Roma, the Hungarian State Opera House in Budapest, Royal Swedish Opera and Croatian National Theatre in Zagreb. He recorded productions of Verdi's Il trovatore at the Verona Arena and Puccini's Madama Butterfly at the Metropolitan Opera.

== Career ==
Morandi was born in Biella. He was solo oboist of the orchestra of La Scala in Milan for ten years, where he assisted conductors such as Riccardo Muti and Giuseppe Patanè. He studied composition in Milan and conducting at the Mozarteum in Salzburg. He studied conducting further in Tanglewood with Leonard Bernstein and Seiji Ozawa. In 1989 he became deputy chief conductor at the Teatro dell'Opera di Roma. He held positions at the Hungarian State Opera House in Budapest, and at the Royal Swedish Opera in Stockholm. He worked at many Italian opera houses, the La Monnaie in Brussels, Opernhaus Zürich, the Vienna State Opera, the Semperoper in Dresden, and the Metropolitan Opera in New York City, among others.

Morandi is focused on Italian opera of the 19th and early 20th century, such as Rossini's Il barbiere di Siviglia, Donizetti's L'elisir d'amore, Bellini's La sonnambula, and works by Verdi and Puccini. In 2012, he conducted a production of Puccini's La fanciulla del West in Stockholm, directed by Christof Loy and with Nina Stemme in the title role which was recorded on DVD. A reviewer summarised that he "moulds the score into a beautiful whole" with a Puccini "surge". In 2019, he conducted a production of Verdi's Il trovatore at the Verona Arena, directed by Franco Zeffirelli, with Anna Netrebko as Leonora and Yusif Eyvazov in the title role, which was recorded on DVD. A performance of Puccini's Madama Butterfly from the Metropolitan Opera on 10 November 2019 was streamed live, with Hui He in the title role. He conducted at the Oper Frankfurt Puccini's Madama Butterfly and Il trittico among others, the latter in 2022 in a 2008 production directed by Claus Guth, with Željko Lučić, Elza van den Heever and Victória Pitts in leading roles. In 2023 he conducted Verdi's Falstaff at the Greek National Opera.
