= Federica Lombardi =

Italian operatic soprano (born 1989)

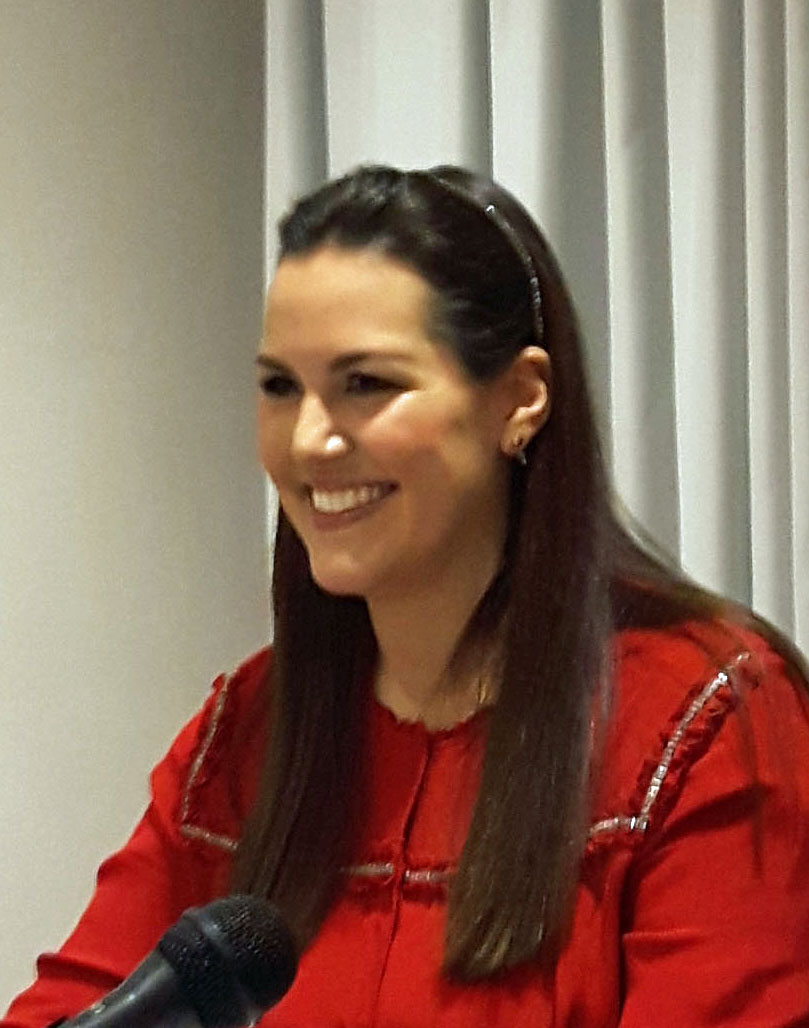
Image of Federica Lombardi

Federica Lombardi (born 19 April 1989) is an Italian operatic soprano.

== Biography ==
Born in Cesena, Lombardi studied at the Istituto Musicale Angelo Masini in Forlì, with Catina Florio. In 2015 she was a participant in the Salzburg Festival Young Singers Project. She made her debut at La Scala Milan in the title role of Donizetti's Anna Bolena in 2017. At La Scala she has also sung Musetta in La bohème and in 2019 appeared there as Elettra in Mozart's Idomeneo. Among other performances, she has sung the roles of Micaëla in Carmen and the Countess in Le nozze di Figaro at the Deutsche Oper Berlin, Fiordiligi in Così fan tutte at the Bavarian State Opera Munich, the role of Donna Elvira in Don Giovanni at the Vienna State Opera and the role of Donna Anna in the same opera at the Teatro Comunale di Bologna. Lombardi made her debut at the Metropolitan Opera New York as Donna Elvira in 2019. On May 20, 2023, she appeared as Donna Anna in the Metropolitan Opera Live in HD presentation.

She also has sung at the Royal Opera House (debut in 2022 as Countess in Le nozze di Figaro), Teatro Real, Teatro dell'Opera di Roma, Opéra national de Lorraine, Teatro Comunale di Bologna, Teatro Regio di Torino, Lyric Opera of Chicago, Berlin State Opera, Hamburg State Opera, Staatsoper Stuttgart and Cologne Opera.

== Recordings ==
- Giuseppe Verdi: Otello with Federica Lombardi as Desdemona, Jonas Kaufmann as Otello, Carlos Álvarez as Iago, the Orchestra dell'Accademia Nazionale di Santa Cecilia conducted by Antonio Pappano. 2 CDs (studio recording), Sony Cat:19439707932. Released 2020.
