= George Gagnidze =

Georgian operatic baritone

- Education: Tbilisi State Conservatoire, Georgia
- Occupation: Baritone
- Years active: 1996–present
- Children: 2
- Website: georgegagnidze.com

George Gagnidze (Georgian: გიორგი გაგნიძე) is a Georgian operatic baritone specializing in the Italian dramatic repertoire. He has performed at New York's Metropolitan Opera every season since 2008/09, including playing Giuseppe Verdi's Rigoletto.

== Early life and career ==
Gagnidze was born in Tbilisi and trained at the Tbilisi State Conservatoire.

He made his debut as Renato in Verdi's Un ballo in maschera at the Paliashvili State Opera in 1996. As an award-winner of the "Leyla Gencer Voice Competition" and the "Elena Obraztsova Competition", he entered and won the "Concorso Voci Verdiane" chaired by Katia Ricciarelli and José Carreras in 2005.

== International career ==
Following engagements in the ensembles of the opera houses of Osnabrück, and Weimar in 2008 Gagnidze performed the role of Scarpia in Giacomo Puccini's Tosca with the New York Philharmonic conducted by Lorin Maazel at Avery Fisher Hall at Lincoln Center in New York City. Anthony Tommasini praised his performance in The New York Times: "The Georgian baritone George Gagnidze was an exceptionally menacing Scarpia, singing with robust, earthy power and seductive lyricism when the villain turns on the charm".

Gagnidze made his Metropolitan Opera debut in 2009 in the title role of Verdi's Rigoletto. He performed Scarpia in Luc Bondy's new production of Tosca conducted by James Levine in 2009, including a performance that was broadcast in HD in cinemas around the world. He has since returned to the Met as the protagonist of Verdi's Macbeth, Alfio in Pietro Mascagni's Cavalleria rusticana, Tonio in Ruggero Leoncavallo's Pagliacci and Šakovlity in Modest Mussorgsky's Khovanshchina. In 2013 he participated in another HD cinema broadcast of Tosca at the Met.

Other opera companies where Gagnidze has performed lead roles include the Teatro alla Scala in Milan, the Opéra National de Paris, the Vienna State Opera, the Deutsche Oper Berlin, the Staatsoper Berlin, the Arena of Verona the Gran Teatre del Liceu in Barcelona, the Teatro Real in Madrid as well as the Aix-en-Provence Festival and Les Chorégies d'Orange.

He made his San Francisco Opera debut and role debut as Carlo Gérard in Umberto Giordano's Andrea Chénier in September 2016.

Particularly notable engagements in 2017 have included his U.K. debut as Šakovlity in Mussorgsky's Khovanshchina at the BBC Proms conducted by Semyon Bychkov and the title role of Nabucco in a new production at the Arena of Verona which was also telecast internationally by Arte.

In 2018 and 2019 he made his role debuts as Barnaba in Amilcare Ponchielli's La Gioconda at the Deutsche Oper Berlin and as Michele in the centennial production of Puccini's Il tabarro at the Metropolitan Opera, performed Giorgio Germont in La traviata and Iago in Otello at the Opéra Bastille of Paris. He also sang Iago at Deutsche Oper Berlin and Washington National Opera as well as the title role of Nabucco at the Deutsche Oper Berlin. Gagnidze made his house debut at the Teatro San Carlo in Naples, singing Alfio in Cavalleria rusticana in summer 2019, a role he repeated in performances at the Sassi di Matera which were telecast internationally. Gagnidze sang his 100th performance as Rigoletto in 2019 at the Metropolitan Opera, where he made his house debut in 2009 in the same role.

== Conductors ==
Gagnidze has worked with conductors James Levine, Lorin Maazel, Zubin Mehta, Fabio Luisi, James Conlon, Nicola Luisotti, Daniel Oren, Gianandrea Noseda, and Kirill Petrenko.

== Recordings ==
- 2010: Giacomo Puccini: Tosca, Metropolitan Opera New York, DVD, Virgin Classics
- 2015: Giuseppe Verdi: Aida, Teatro alla Scala, Milan, DVD/Blu-Ray, CMajor Entertainment
- 2018: Giuseppe Verdi: Nabucco, Arena di Verona, Verona, DVD/Blu-Ray, BelAir Classiques
