= Anita Rachvelishvili =

Georgian operatic mezzo-soprano

Anita Rachvelishvili ანიტა რაჭველიშვილი
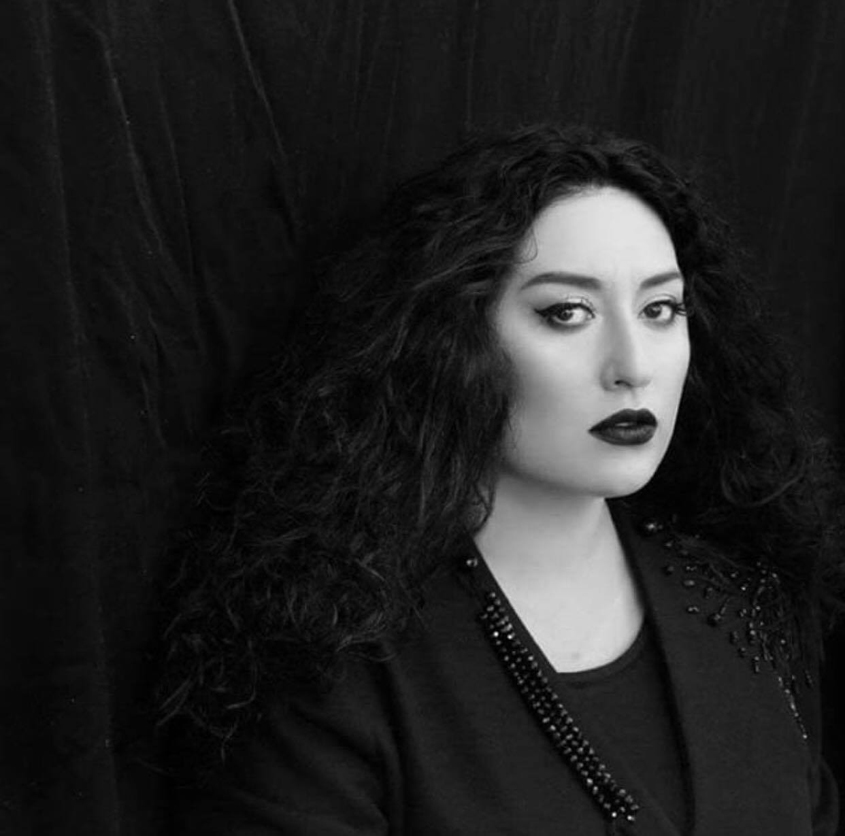
- Rachvelishvili in 2019

Background information
- Born: 28 June 1984 (age 42); Tbilisi, Georgia
- Genres: Classical music, Jazz, Crossover music
- Occupation: Mezzo-soprano

Anita Rachvelishvili (Georgian: ანიტა რაჭველიშვილი, ra-tch—veli-shvili; born 1984 in Tbilisi) is a Georgian operatic mezzo-soprano. She is especially known for singing Verdi; conductor Riccardo Muti said in 2018: "She is without doubt the best Verdi mezzo-soprano today on the planet. Without. Doubt." She is also well known for singing Bizet's Carmen. Opera News magazine has stated that "Rachvelishvili is a unique dramatic presence. Her dark, smoldering eyes and cascading black curls are striking, but what is unusual is the juxtaposition of fiery surface and an inward-focused quality, seeming to draw power from some secret space."

Earlier in her career she became the youngest singer ever to open a season at La Scala. A New York Times portrayal in late 2018 said that she had achieved the highest echelon of her profession during that year. American critic Alex Ross has said of her abilities: "The [opera house] should let her do whatever she wants: artists of this calibre are the reason opera exists."

== Early life ==
Rachvelishvili grew up in Tbilisi in what was then the Georgian Soviet Socialist Republic. Her mother did folk dance and ballet, her father was a composer and bass guitarist, and both did some singing. Young Anita grew up in difficult circumstances in the wake of the breakup of the Soviet Union, including some civil wars: "no electricity, no water, no food, nothing." She is fluent in Georgian, English, and several other languages.

As a girl she studied piano and for a time was at the Mukhran Machavariani School. Her musical tastes started with the likes of Led Zeppelin, Pink Floyd, and Whitesnake. She then enjoyed singing popular music on the order of Whitney Houston and Mariah Carey. Her voice was such that friends and family convinced her to try operatic singing, and beginning at age 16 she began to study for same.

== Training and career ==
Anita Rachvelishvili passed the entrance audition and entered the Tbilisi State Conservatoire where she trained as a singer under Manana Egadze. Financial support came in part from a stipend from the president's office Mikheil Saakashvili of Georgia. She made her debut at the Georgian National Opera Theater as Maddalena in Rigoletto while still a student. She won the Paata Burchuladze Prize in 2007.

She went on to further study at the highly regarded young singers’ academy at the Teatro alla Scala in Milan. Attempts to find funding for this studying were fruitless and her family went into debt in order that she have this opportunity. Her career breakthrough came when she was chosen by the then music director of La Scala, Daniel Barenboim, to sing the title role in a new production of Carmen at that theatre. This production of Carmen in 2009 with tenor Jonas Kaufmann as Don José was televised worldwide and brought Anita Rachvelishvili to international attention. Of this break she has said, "it was unbelievable and a fabulous challenge for me, something which changed a lot in my life."

Praised for her strong voice and striking stage presence, her Carmen came into significant demand. Rachvelishvili has performed the role of Carmen at leading opera houses including The Royal Opera, London, the Canadian Opera Company, the Metropolitan Opera New York, and others.

She is well regarded in her homeland; Georgian newspaper The Financial has stated: "Long, black curly hair, strict but at the same time very tender - a view of this beautiful Georgian lady would convince you that she is the best Bizet’s Carmen ever." Her 2016 wedding was streamed online by the director of the Georgian Philharmonic Orchestra. She has expressed the desire to promulgate Georgian music: "Yes, we have lots of beautiful operas in Georgian. I hope to sing Georgian opera in Europe or America someday!" She performs frequent charity concerts on Georgian television, including some jazz or folk songs in her repertoire. Overall she retains strong bonds with her home country and is emotionally invested in Georgia becoming prosperous and successful.

Other roles at leading opera houses include Orfeo in Orfeo ed Euridice, Dalila in Samson and Delilah, Dulcinée in Don Quichotte and Končakovna in Prince Igor. In 2016, Rachvelishvili appeared as Amneris in highly acclaimed performances of Aida at the Paris Opera and in 2018 at the Metropolitan Opera. A New York Times review of the last of these was highly praiseful, calling her performance "stupendous", especially highlighting her singing across titular star Anna Netrebko: "[both] sang ferociously as they hurled accusatory phrases at each other. Yet each found moments in the music to suggest the womanly longing that consumes them."

== Recorded works ==
She has appeared in DVDs of Orfeo ed Euridice and Prince Igor and streaming videos of Prince Igor, Carmen, Aida, and Adriana Lecouvreur at Met Opera on Demand. She also sang on an album by Italian progressive rock band Profusion.

== Albums ==
Year	Title	Label
2018	Anita	Sony Classical
2021	"Elegie"	Sony Classical
