= Kristine Opolais =

Latvian operatic soprano (born 1979)

Kristīne Opolais
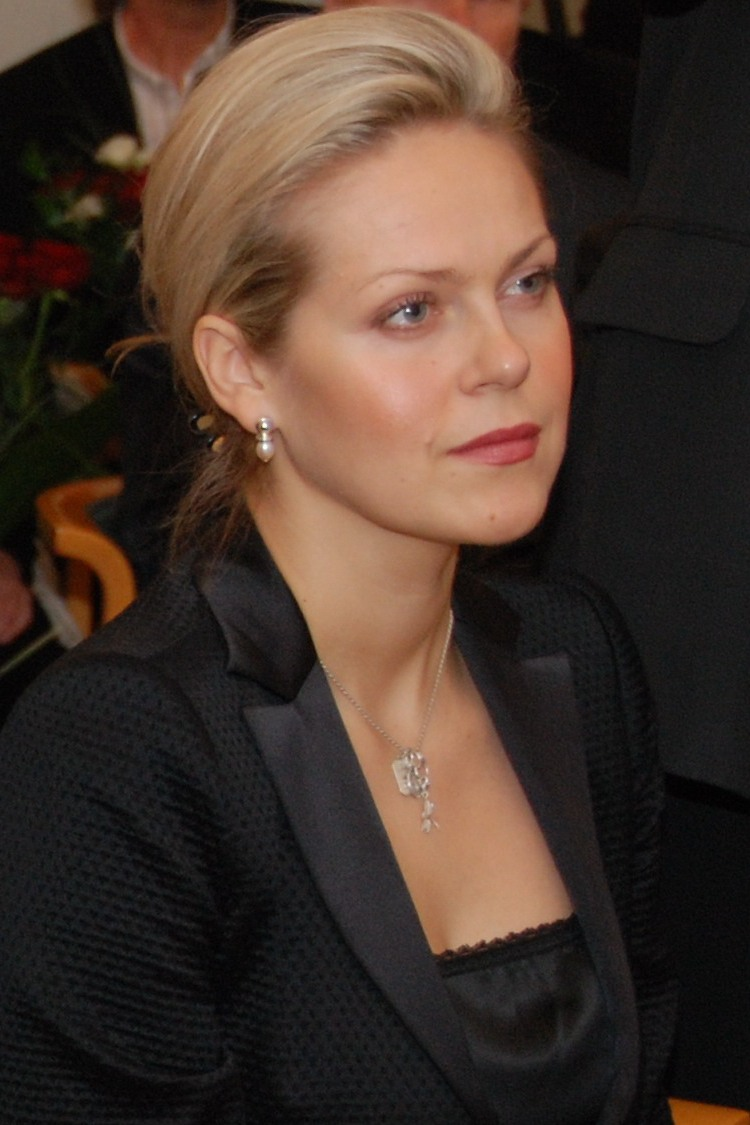
- Opolais in 2009
- Born: 12 November 1979 (age 46); Rēzekne, Latvian SSR
- Occupation: Opera singer
- Years active: 2001–present
- Spouse: Andris Nelsons (m. 2011; div. 2018)
- Children: 1
- Website: kristineopolais.com

Kristīne Opolais (born 12 November 1979) is a Latvian operatic soprano.

== Biography ==
Opolais was born in Rēzekne, Latvia, and studied at the Latvian Academy of Music.

Opolais started her career as a member of the chorus with Latvian National Opera in 2001, and in 2003 became a soloist. It was there that she met her future husband, the conductor Andris Nelsons.

She first achieved wider recognition in 2006, when she made her debut at the Staatsoper Unter den Linden in Berlin, followed by debuts at 2008 at La Scala in Milan and the Vienna State Opera in 2008, and in October 2010 the Bavarian State Opera in the title role of Dvořák's Rusalka in a new production directed by Martin Kušej.

In 2011, Opolais made her debut with London's Royal Opera, singing the title role in Puccini's Madama Butterfly, conducted by Nelsons. In 2013, she made her debut at The Proms in London's Royal Albert Hall, singing arias by Verdi and Tchaikovsky, with the City of Birmingham Symphony Orchestra.

On 5 April 2014, with just five and a half hours' notice, Opolais substituted as Mimì in Puccini's La bohème in the Metropolitan Opera's matinee performance. The substitution was necessitated by the scheduled Anita Hartig being too ill to perform. Although Opolais had performed the role several times in the past, including at the Vienna State Opera, she was currently in the title role of another opera, Puccini's Madama Butterfly, and had sung it there for the first time the previous evening. She had not fallen asleep until about 5am, but was woken by a 7:30am phone call asking her to sing again at the 1pm matinee, which was being broadcast around the world as part of the Met's Live in HD series. Opolais performed the part again at the Metropolitan Opera's 2014/15 season production.

Opolais' singing in Madama Butterfly at the Met has received positive reviews. The New York Observer noted her "soaring voice and penetrating theatrical presence", and that "she is the most compelling Met Cio-Cio-San since Diana Soviero last sang the role here nearly 20 years ago."

Opolais performed the title role in Puccini's Manon Lescaut at Covent Garden in the 2013/14 season and also at the New York Met in February and March 2016.

In February and March 2017, she appeared as Rusalka in the Metropolitan Opera's new production of Dvořák's opera.

== Personal life ==
Opolais married conductor Andris Nelsons, a fellow Latvian, in 2011 and they divorced in 2018. Their daughter was born in December 2011.
