= Kyle Ketelsen =

American bass-baritone opera singer

Kyle Ketelsen (born c. 1971) is an American bass-baritone opera singer.

== Early life and training ==
Kyle Ketelsen was born in Clinton, Iowa, and graduated from Clinton High School in 1989, after which, for a brief time, he took general education courses at Mount St. Clare College in Clinton. With the intention of becoming a helicopter pilot, he joined the Army National Guard, in which he served from 1990 to 1996. In 1991 he transferred to the University of Iowa. Having been musical since a young age, he sang for the vocal faculty, and they encouraged him to become a music major. He studied singing with Albert Gammon at the university, where he received a Bachelor of Music degree in 1995, and then, on Gammon's recommendation, with Giorgio Tozzi at Indiana University, Bloomington, where he graduated in 1999 with a Master of Music. Since 2008, he has studied with Scott McCoy.

== Career ==
Ketelsen has performed leading roles at the New York City Opera, the Metropolitan Opera in New York, the Bavarian State Opera, the Gran Teatre del Liceu in Barcelona, and the Festival d'Aix-en-Provence.

His repertoire includes Don Giovanni and Leporello (Don Giovanni), Figaro (Le nozze di Figaro), Escamillo (Carmen), Kaspar (Der Freischütz), Golaud (Pelléas et Mélisande), and Angelotti (Tosca).

== Personal life ==
Ketelsen lives in Sun Prairie, Wisconsin, with his wife Rebecca, daughter Melanie, and son Benjamin.

== Video recordings ==
- 2008: Mozart's Don Giovanni (Simon Keenlyside as Don Giovanni, Kyle Ketelsen as Leporello, Eric Halfvarson as the Commendatore, Marina Poplavskaya as Donna Anna, Joyce DiDonato as Donna Elvira, Ramón Vargas as Don Ottavio, Miah Persson as Zerlina, Robert Gleadow as Masetto), conducted by Charles Mackerras, and recorded live at the Royal Opera House on 8 and 12 September 2008
- 2010: Mozart's Don Giovanni (Bo Skovhus as Don Giovanni, Kyle Ketelsen as Leporello, Anatoli Kotscherga as the Commendatore, Marlis Petersen as Donna Anna, Kristine Opolais as Donna Elvira, Colin Balzer as Don Ottavio, Kerstin Avemo as Zerlina, David Bižić as Masetto), Freiburg Baroque Orchestra conducted by Louis Langrée, produced by Dmitri Tcherniakov and the Festival d'Aix-en-Provence, recorded live at the Théâtre de l'Archevêché in July 2010
- 2016: Debussy's Pelléas et Mélisande (Jacques Imbrailo as Pelléas, Corinne Winters as Mélisande, Kyle Ketelsen as Golaud, Brindley Sherratt as Arkel), Philharmonia Zurich conducted by Alain Altinoglu, produced by Dmitri Tcherniakov, and recorded live at the Zürich Opera in May 2016
- 2022: Kevin Puts's The Hours (Renée Fleming as Clarissa Vaughan, Kelli O'Hara as Laura Brown, Joyce DiDonato as Virginia Woolf, William Burden as Louis, Sean Panikkar as Leonard Woolf, Kyle Ketelsen as Richard, Brandon Cedel as Dan Brown), Metropolitan Opera Orchestra, Chorus, and Ballet, conducted by Yannick Nézet-Séguin, produced by Phelim McDermott, and recorded live at the Metropolitan Opera House on 10 December 2022
