= Ambrogio Maestri =

Italian operatic baritone (born 1970)

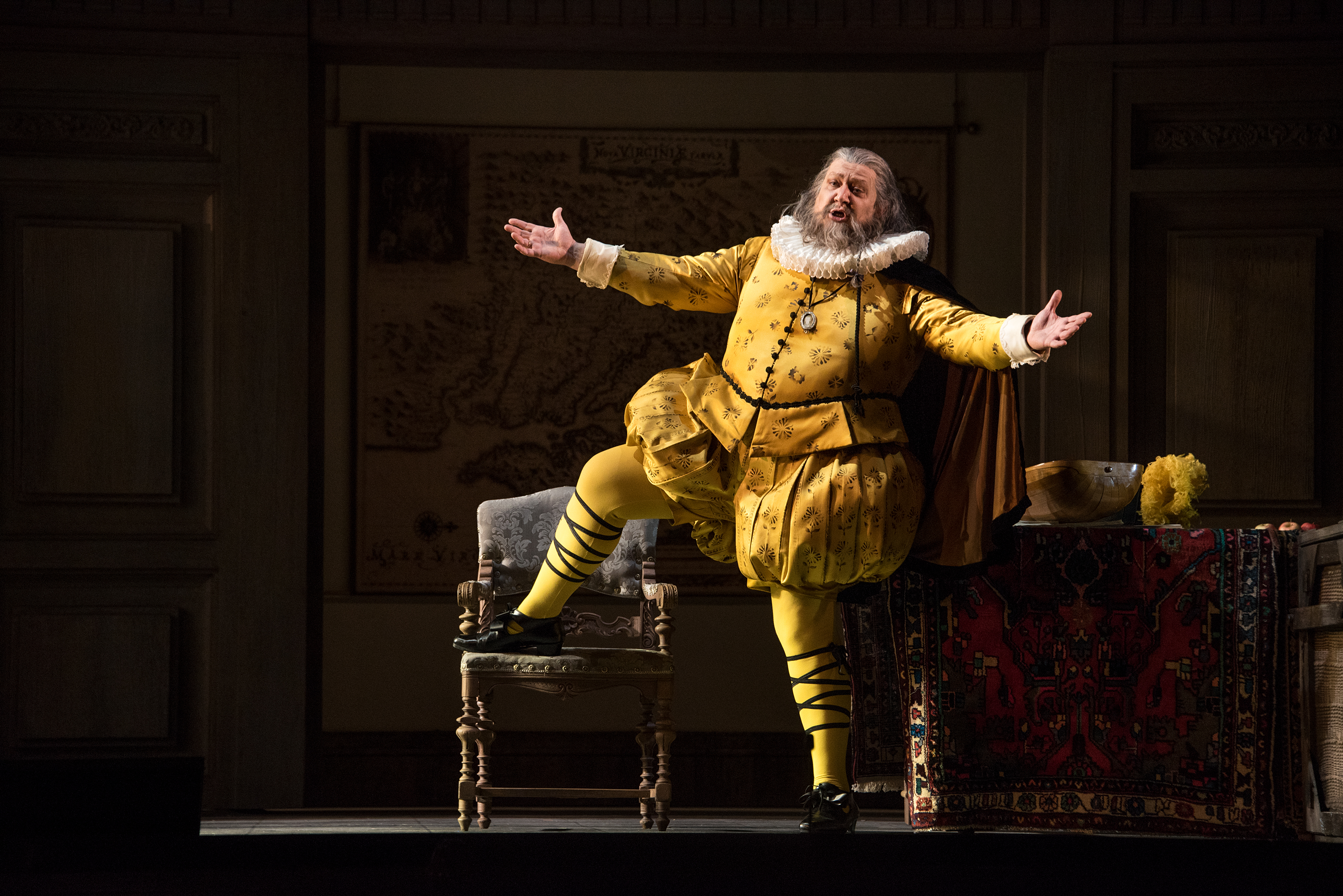
- Maestri as Falstaff, Vienna State Opera, 2016
- Born: 1970 (age 55–56); Italy
- Occupation: operatic baritone

Ambrogio Maestri (born 1970) is an Italian operatic baritone. He is especially known for his portrayal of the title character in Giuseppe Verdi's Falstaff. He studied piano and singing in his home town, Pavia. In Italy he has performed at the Teatro alla Scala in Milan, Teatro di San Carlo in Naples, Teatro Regio in Parma, Teatro dell'Opera di Roma, Teatro Regio in Turin, Teatro Verdi in Trieste and the Arena di Verona. Abroad he has performed at the Deutsche Oper Berlin, Teatro Nacional de São Carlos in Lisbon, the Royal Opera House in London, the Teatro Real in Madrid, the Metropolitan Opera in New York City, San Francisco Opera House, the Konzerthaus and the Staatsoper in Vienna, the Gran Teatre del Liceu in Barcelona and others.

He presents as a powerful, robust man on stage. Gramophone has described him as Italy's answer to Bryn Terfel, "fresh-voiced [and] emotionally sympathetic."

He has been critically praised by the likes of Riccardo Muti. Edward Seckerson of The Independent said of his performance as Falstaff at the Royal Opera House of London that he is "wonderfully real, animating all aspects of the text and making great play of the innate contradiction between a booming, boorish, authority and those mellifluous remnants of wily old airs and graces."

One of his earliest roles was Monterone in Rigoletto, in 1999; he was cast by then-director Placido Domingo at the Washington National Opera. In 2003 he played Rolando in La battaglia di Legnano at the Teatro di San Carlo. In 2012 he played the role of Dr Dulcamara in Gaetano Donizetti's L'elisir d'amore in Vienna, and at the Metropolitan Opera in September and October alongside Anna Netrebko. In December 2013 he gave his 200th performance of Falstaff in a new production by the Metropolitan Opera in New York.

He appears in complete opera streaming videos of Falstaff, L'elisir d'amore, and Adriana Lecouvreur at Met Opera on Demand.

Besides his involvement in opera, he is known for his published recipes for Italian food (particularly risottos), and for his cooking videos (some of which are posted to YouTube.)

== Repertory ==
- Giacomo Puccini: Tosca (Scarpia), Gianni Schicchi, Il tabarro (Michele)
- Alfredo Catalani: La Wally
- Gaetano Donizetti: L'elisir d'amore, Lucia di Lammermoor, Don Pasquale (title role)
- Ruggero Leoncavallo: Pagliacci
- Pietro Mascagni: Cavalleria rusticana
- Giuseppe Verdi: Falstaff, Aida, Il trovatore, La battaglia di Legnano, La forza del destino, La traviata, Nabucco, Otello, Rigoletto, Simon Boccanegra, Un ballo in maschera
