= Aigul Akhmetshina =

Bashkir operatic mezzo-soprano (born 1996)

Aigul Akhmetshina (Bashkir: Айгөл Әхмәтшина) is a Bashkir operatic mezzo-soprano.

== Early life and education ==
Akhmetshina was born in 1996 in the village of Kirgiz-Miyaki in the Republic of Bashkortostan in the Russian Federation.

In 2016 she graduated from Ufa State Institute of Arts.

Though a Russian citizen, she stated in an interview with The Times in 2024 that "I'm not Russian. I'm Bashkir, and half Tatar”, and expressed a desire to become a British citizen.

Her family were amateur singers and encouraged her talent. After being refused the opportunity to study music at a Moscow university, she gained a place on the Jette Parker Young Artists Programme at the Royal Opera House in London.

== Career ==
On New Year's Eve 2023, Akhmetshina appeared in the title role in Carmen at the Metropolitan Opera. She was described by Zachary Woolfe of the New York Times as "the only truly impressive aspect" of the production. In 2024, Akhmetshina appeared in the same opera and role at the Royal Opera House.

== Recordings ==
Akhmetshina's first album, titled Aigul, was released on 26 July 2024, on the Decca Classics label. It features arias from Carmen, Werther, I Capuleti e i Montecchi, La Cenerentola, The Barber of Seville; Daniele Rustioni conducting the Royal Philharmonic Orchestra. In a five star review in The Guardian, Erica Jeal wrote "Her debut solo recording perfectly showcases the glowing expansiveness, swagger and breathtaking poise of Akhmetshina’s arresting voice". The German magazine Oper! named the album CD of the month in its September issue.

== Awards ==
- 2017 – Grand Prix of International Hans Gabor Belvedere Singing Competition
- 2021 – Honored Artist of the Republic of Bashkortostan
- 2022 – Winner of "Casta diva" (Russian opera award)
- 2023 – Winner of International Opera Awards
