= Dmitry Belosselskiy =

Russian operatic bass singer

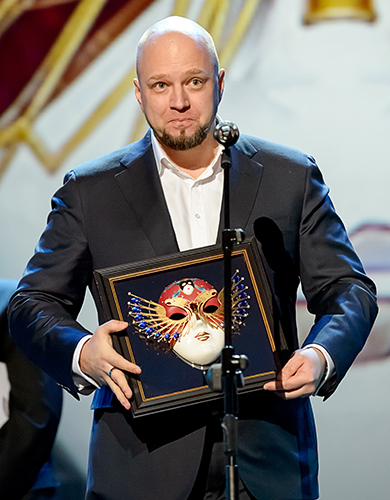
- Beloselsky receiving the 2015 Golden Mask Award
- Born: 16 July 1975 (age 51); Pavlograd, USSR
- Education: Gnessin State Musical College
- Occupation: Operatic bass
- Organizations: Bolshoi Theatre; Metropolitan Opera
- Awards: International Tchaikovsky Competition

Dmitry Stanislavovich Belosselskiy (Russian: Дмитрий Станиславович Белосельский; born 16 July 1975) is a Russian operatic bass singer.

Born in 1975 in Pavlograd, Ukrainian SSR, Belosselskiy studied at the Gnessin State Musical College in Moscow. He was a soloist with Vladimir Minin's Moscow Chamber Choir, singing on tours to France, Germany, Japan, the US. and Argentina. From 2005, he was a soloist with the choir of Moscow's Sretensky Monastery in Moscow, with tours to South America, the US, Canada and Australia.

He was a soloist of the Bolshoi Theatre in Moscow from 2010 to 2013, where his roles included Zaccaria in Verdi's Nabucco, King Rene in Tchaikovsky's Iolanta, Malyuta Skuratov in Rimsky-Korsakov's The Tsar's Bride, Escamillo in Bizet's Carmen, the title role of Mussorgsky's Boris Godunov, Philipp in Verdi's Don Carlos, and Méphistophélès in La damnation de Faust by Berlioz.

Belosselskiy appeared at the Bavarian State Opera in 2013 in the title role of Verdi's Macbeth, in 2014 in the title role of his Simon Boccanegra, and in 2017 as Boris Godunov. He made his debut at the Metropolitan Opera in New York City in 2011 as Zaccaria in Verdi's Nabucco, returning in 2018 to appear as Wurm in his Luisa Miller. He appeared at the Frankfurt Opera first in 2018 in the title role of Glinka's Iwan Sussanin in a 2015 production staged by Harry Kupfer, who moved the story to the time of World War II.

== Awards ==
Belosselskiy won second prize in the category male singers at the International Tchaikovsky Competition in 2007. In 2015, he was awarded the Golden Mask, a national theatre prize, for his interpretation of Philipp in Don Carlos at the Bolshoi Theatre.
