= Timur Zangiyev =

Russian footballer and manager

Personal information
- Full name: Timur Magomedovich Zangiyev
- Date of birth: 7 September 1972 (age 54)
- Height: 1.88 m (6 ft 2 in)
- Positions: Midfielder; defender

Senior career*
| Years | Team | Apps | (Gls) |
| 1994–1996 | FC Angusht Nazran | 69 | (1) |
| 1998–2006 | FC Angusht Nazran | 311 | (33) |
| 2009 | FC Angusht Nazran | 0 | (0) |

Managerial career
- 2009: FC Angusht Nazran (assistant)
- 2009: FC Angusht Nazran
- 2010: FC Angusht Nazran (assistant)
- 2010–2013: FC Angusht Nazran
- 2013–2014: FC Angusht Nazran (assistant)
- 2016–2017: FC Angusht Nazran (assistant)
- 2017: FC Angusht Nazran
- * Club domestic league appearances and goals

Timur Magomedovich Zangiyev (Russian: Тимур Магомедович Зангиев; born 7 September 1972) is a Russian professional football manager and a former player.
