= Ryan Speedo Green =

American bass-baritone opera singer (born 1986)

Ryan Speedo Green (born April 1, 1986) is an American bass-baritone opera singer.

== Life and career ==
Green was born in Suffolk, Virginia, and grew up in low-income housing and a trailer park. He has said his middle name was derived from his father: "I was born on April Fools' Day, and my father, who considers himself quite a funny man, thought he would name me – he's a bodybuilder – after his favorite sporting brand. I've kind of embraced it and made it my own." He was sent to juvenile detention at the age of 12 after he threatened to stab his mother and brother.

Green earned a Bachelor of Music degree at the Hartt School of Music and a Master of Music at Florida State University. He won several singing competitions. In March 2011, he was one of the five winners of the Metropolitan Opera National Council Auditions. Following an article by Daniel Bergner in The New York Times about Green and his win in that competition, HarperCollins expressed interest in publishing his biography. It was published in October 2016 with the title Sing for Your Life: A Story of Race, Music, and Family. In 2014 he received the George London Foundation Award, won first prize of the Gerda Lissner Foundation, was a finalist in Palm Beach Opera's singing competition, and graduated from the Metropolitan Opera's Lindemann Young Artist Development Program.

Green sang the Commendatore in Don Giovanni at the Juilliard School in New York and at Opera Colorado in Denver where he was Resident Artist in 2010–11. There he also sang Colline in La bohème and Don Magnifico in La Cenerentola. In 2012, he sang Colline for Central City Opera. In 2014 he sang Zuniga in Carmen for the Wolf Trap Opera Company in Vienna, Virginia.

He made his Metropolitan Opera debut in 2012–13 as Mandarin in Puccini's Turandot, followed by Parsifal as a Grail Knight. The following season at the Met saw him as the Bonze in Madama Butterfly and as the Jailer in Tosca. In 2014–15 he sang Rambo in The Death of Klinghoffer at the Met. Green returned to the Met in 2016 as Colline. In 2018, he sang Oroe in Semiramide. In 2025, he sang Queequeg in the Met's premiere production of Jake Heggie's Moby-Dick.

In 2014 Green became a member of the Vienna State Opera. His roles there included Angelotti in Tosca, Sparafucile in Rigoletto, Basilio in The Barber of Seville, a Jew in Salome, Fouquier-Tinville in Andrea Chénier, a Monk in Don Carlos, Titurel in Parsifal, the King in Aida, Timur in Turandot, and Varlaam in Boris Godunov. He appeared as guest artist in Opéra de Lille's 2016 production of in Il trovatore as Ferrando. Later that year, Green debuted at the Salzburg Festival in Die Liebe der Danae as one of the Kings.

In concerts, Green has sung in Handel's Messiah, in Mozart's Requiem and Coronation Mass, and in Verdi's Messa da Requiem. He sang several times in Beethoven's Symphony No. 9, first in 2014 with the Philadelphia Orchestra.

== Honors and awards ==
- 2011: Winner of the Metropolitan Opera National Council Auditions
- 2011: Sara Tucker Study Grant
- 2014: George London Foundation Award
- 2014: First prize from the Gerda Lissner Foundation
- 2014: Leonore Annenberg Fund for the Performing and Visual Arts Grant
- 2014: Richard Tucker Career Grant
