= Adam Plachetka =

Czech bass-baritone (born 1985)

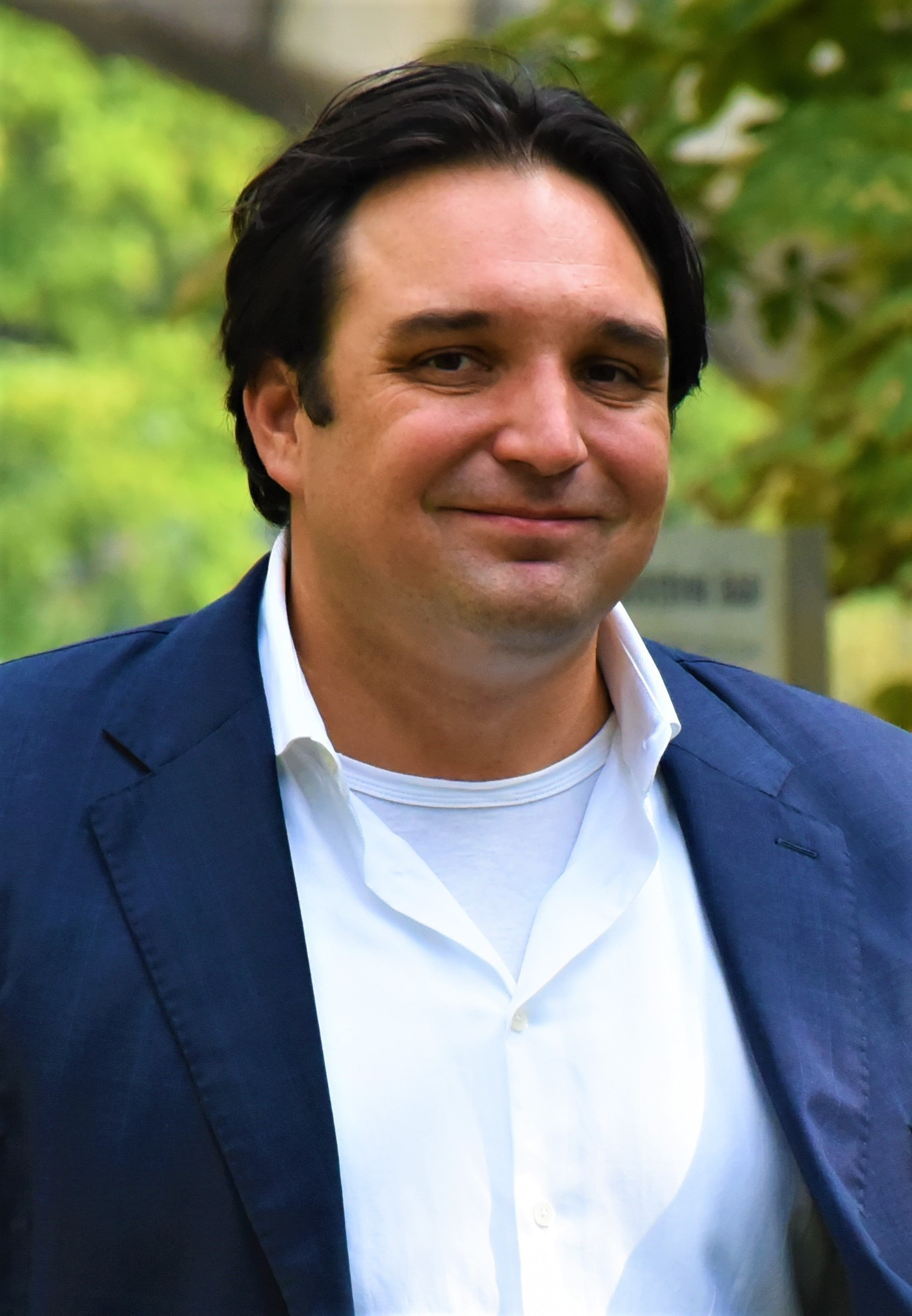

Adam Plachetka (born 4 May 1985) is a Czech bass-baritone. He was born in Prague, where he was also educated, and won several singing competitions in the Czech Republic. In 2005 he made his debut at the National Theatre in Prague, where his roles have included the title role in Don Giovanni, Figaro (Le nozze di Figaro), Guglielmo (Così fan tutte), Nardo (La finta giardiniera), Publio (La clemenza di Tito) and Argante (Rinaldo). For the Prague State Opera, he sang Papageno (Die Zauberflöte) and Don Basilio (Il barbiere di Siviglia).

In 2007 he made his debut at the Salzburg Festival as Pompeo in Benvenuto Cellini conducted by Valery Gergiev. He also appeared there as Hajný (Rusalka), Antonio (Le nozze di Figaro) and Masetto (Don Giovanni). In 2009 he took part in David Alden's production of La Calisto as Sylvano at the Bavarian State Opera in Munich. In September 2010 he became a member of the ensemble of the Vienna State Opera where he made his debut as Schaunard in La bohème.

On 28 October 2026, Plachetka was awarded by the Czech Republic's Medal of Merit for services to the state in the field of arts.
