= Greer Grimsley =

American bass-baritone

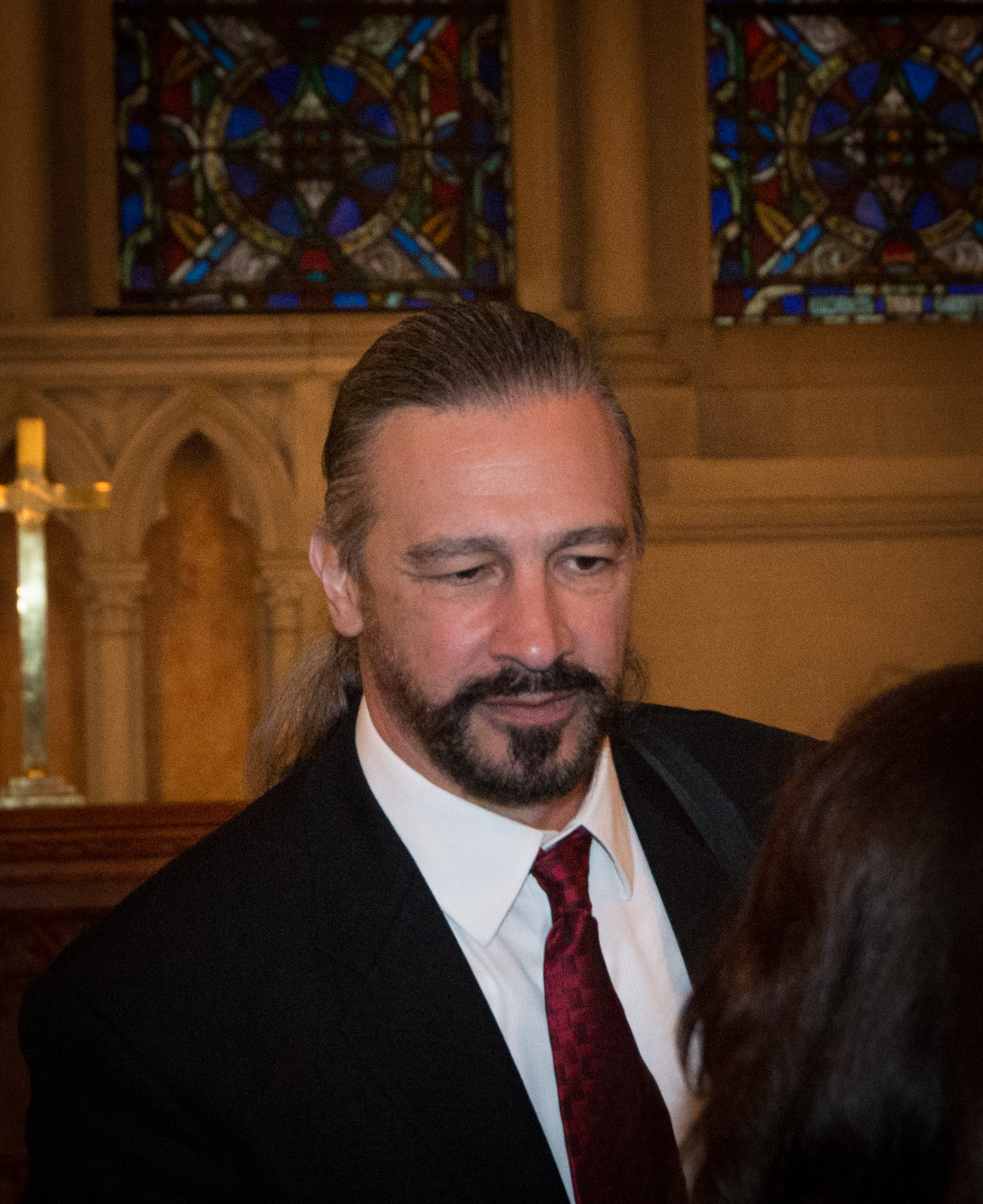
Greer Grimsley at Old South Church, Boston, Massachusetts

Greer Grimsley (born May 30, 1956) is an American bass-baritone who has had an active international opera career for the last three decades. He has sung leading roles with all of America's leading opera companies, including the Metropolitan Opera, the Lyric Opera of Chicago, the Seattle Opera, the San Francisco Opera, the Gran Teatre del Liceu of Barcelona, and the Houston Grand Opera. He has also performed on the stages of many important European opera houses.

Since 1987 he has been married to mezzo-soprano Luretta Bybee. From January 1983 to December 1985, he was married to the former Virginia Hancock. The couple married and divorced in Houston, Texas.

== Life and career ==
Born in New Orleans, Louisiana, Grimsley is a graduate of Brother Martin High School. He studied voice at Loyola University New Orleans and at the Juilliard School in New York City. He made his professional opera debut in 1980 at the Houston Grand Opera as one of the Armed Men in Wolfgang Amadeus Mozart's The Magic Flute.

Grimsley first drew wide attention in the mid 1980s when he portrayed Escamillo in the acclaimed international tour of the Tony Award winning adaptation of Georges Bizet's Carmen, La Tragédie de Carmen. The production was directed by Peter Brook. This was soon followed by his first portrayal of Jochanaan in Richard Strauss's Salome at the Scottish Opera in 1988; a role with which he is now closely associated.

His website, www.greergrimsley.com, says: "Grimsley is internationally recognized as an outstanding singing actor and one of the most prominent Wagnerian singers of our day. Continuing his reign as a leading interpreter of the god Wotan, he sang the eminent role for the Metropolitan Opera’s Ring Cycle in Robert Lepage’s landmark production, directly followed by Stephen Wadsworth’s production for Seattle Opera, his 3rd complete Cycle for the company in the last decade. The Huffington Post exclaimed: 'Grimsley commanded the stage in ‘Das Rheingold’ and ‘Die Walkure’ with his wide-ranging and handsome voice, and equally so in ‘Siegfried.’ He was fresh and powerful in all that he did. He sings…well…like a god... The world has waited for a very long time for a Wotan who can sing without barking or rasping, and he has arrived.' "
