= Anita Hartig =

Romanian operatic soprano

Anita Hartig (born 1983) is a Romanian operatic soprano.

Born in Bistrița, Hartig studied at the Gheorghe Dima Music Academy in Cluj-Napoca, graduating in 2006.

Hartig has had particular success in the role of Mimì in Puccini's La bohème. She first sang Mimì in 2006 at the Cluj-Napoca Romanian National Opera. She sang the role in Welsh National Opera's 2012 new production directed by Annabel Arden, and has since sung the role with The Royal Opera, London, the Metropolitan Opera, New York, and the Vienna State Opera. In 2012, London's The Daily Telegraph reported that she was "enjoying special success" as Mimì.

On 1 November 2014, Hartig made her Metropolitan Opera Live in HD debut as Micaëla in Carmen. Following the cancellation of Ailyn Pérez, Hartig made her debut at the Gran Teatre del Liceu, Barcelona in July 2015 as Violetta in La traviata . On 30 January 2016, she sang Liù from Turandot in another Metropolitan Opera Live in HD performance alongside Nina Stemme in the title role, Marco Berti as Calaf and Alexander Tsymbalyuk as Timur.

In the Metropolitan Opera's Spring 2019 production of La traviata, she once again played Violetta.
