= Jongmin Park =

South Korean opera singer (born 1986)

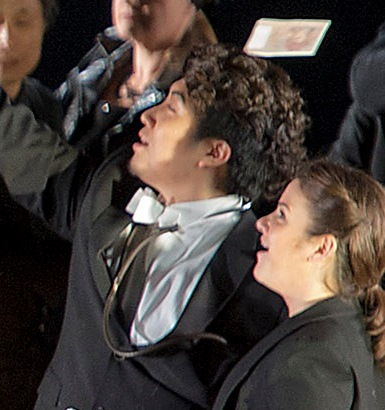
- Jongmin Park (left) as Dottore Grenvil with Rebecca Jo Loeb as Annina in La traviata at the Hamburg State Opera, 2013
- Born: 1986; Seoul, South Korea
- Education: Korea National University of Arts; Accademia del Teatro alla Scala
- Occupation: opera singer (bass)

Jongmin Park (Korean: 박종민, born 1986) is a South Korean opera singer who has sung leading bass roles in the opera houses of Germany, Austria, and the United Kingdom. Born in Seoul, he was the winner of the Song Prize at the 2015 BBC Cardiff Singer of the World competition Park also won First Prize (male singer) at the 2011 Tchaikovsky Competition and the Birgit Nilsson Prize for the German Repertoire of Richard Strauss and Richard Wagner at the 2011 Operalia Competition.

Park studied singing at the Korea National University of Arts and then at the Accademia del Teatro alla Scala in Milan before becoming a member of the Hamburg State Opera from 2010 to 2013. He made his Royal Opera House debut in 2014 as Colline in La bohème and sang at the Vienna State Opera in the 2013/2014 season where his roles included Zuniga in Carmen, Don Bartolo in Le nozze di Figaro, and Colline.
