= Johan Botha (tenor) =

South African operatic tenor (1965–2016)

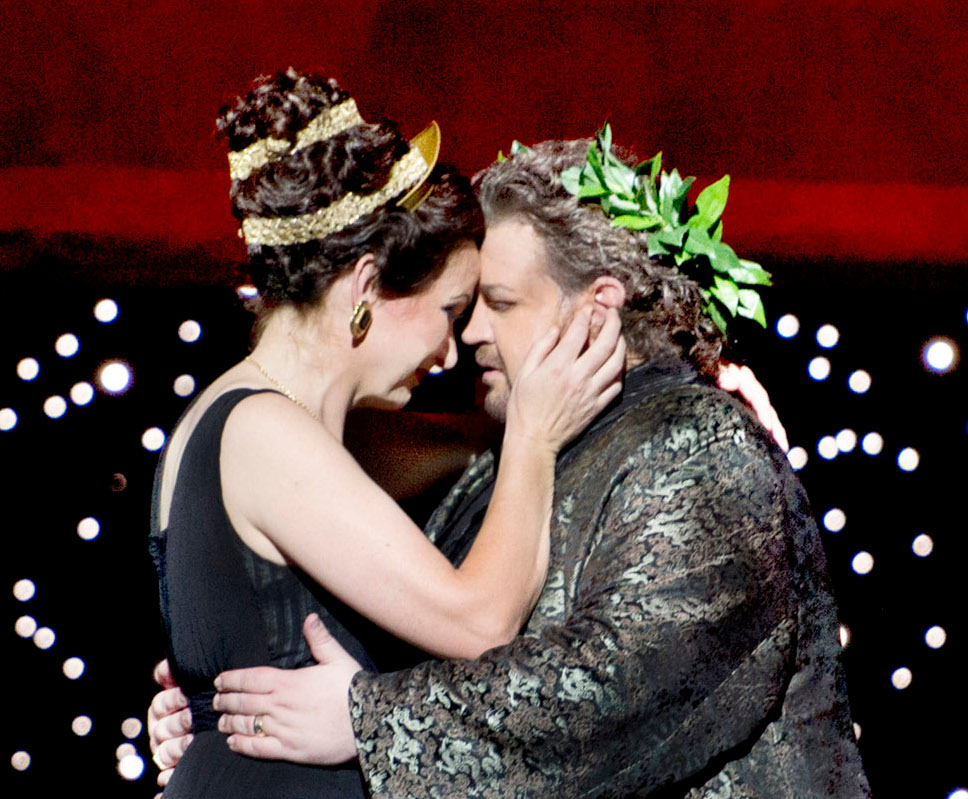
Botha as Tenor/Bacchus in Ariadne auf Naxos with Anne Schwanewilms, Hamburg State Opera, 2012

Johan Botha (19 August 1965 – 8 September 2016) was a South African operatic tenor.

== Life and career ==
Born in Rustenburg, South Africa, Botha began his vocal training with Jarmila Tellinger from the age of 10 through 17. He then served for two years in the South African Air Force before pursuing further studies in Pretoria with Eric Muller. His voice initially was trained as a bass-baritone and his first opera performance was portraying the title role in a student production of Verdi's Falstaff. As his studies progressed under Muller his voice moved towards that of a tenor. In 1990 he moved to Europe and became a longtime pupil of Irmgard Hartmann.

Botha made his professional stage debut at the municipal theatre in Roodepoort as Max in Der Freischütz in 1989. He then became a member of the opera chorus at the Bayreuth Festival in 1990. In 1991 he sang Riccardo in Un ballo in maschera at the Pfalztheater Kaiserslautern. This was followed by performances at opera houses in Dortmund, Hagen, Hildesheim and Bonn. His international breakthrough occurred in 1993 at the Opéra Bastille as Pinkerton in Puccini's Madama Butterfly. After that, he performed at leading opera venues around the world such as the Metropolitan Opera, Vienna State Opera which made him a Kammersänger in 2003, Opera Australia, Royal Opera House (London), La Scala and the Salzburg Festival.

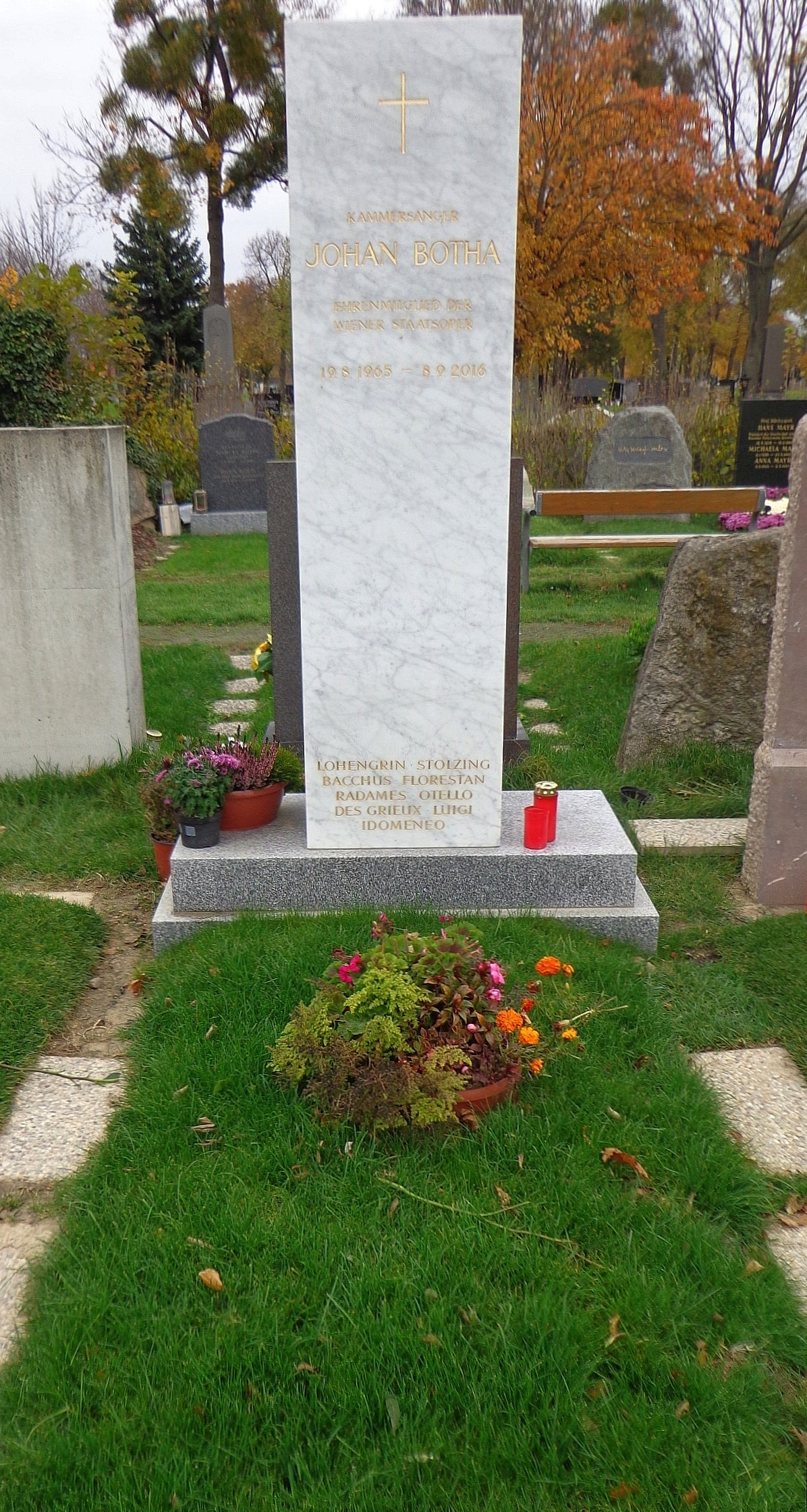
Botha's grave, Vienna Central Cemetery

He died of liver cancer on 8 September 2016 at the age of 51. At the time of his death Botha lived in Vienna, Austria, with his wife Sonja and two sons. A black flag was flown by the Vienna State Opera as a sign of mourning. He was buried at the Vienna Central Cemetery.

== Recordings ==
Johan Botha is the most recorded South African opera singer in history:

- d'Albert: Tiefland under Bertrand de Billy (2006) Oehms OC 312
- Dvořák: Stabat Mater (2001)
- Charles Koechlin: The Jungle Book (1994)
- The Puccini Experience (1995)
- Mahler Symphony No. 8 under Boulez and Bertrand de Billy
- Puccini: Turandot under Gergiev (DVD)
- Richard Strauss: Daphne under Bychkov
- Richard Strauss: Elektra under Barenboim
- Richard Strauss: Friedenstag under Sinopoli
- Richard Strauss: Taillefer
- Verdi: Aida under Gatti (DVD)
- Verdi: Requiem under Sinopoli
- Wagner: Lohengrin under Bychkov
- Wagner: Die Meistersinger von Nürnberg under Thielemann(DVD)
- Wagner: Tannhäuser under James Levine at Met (2015).
- Wagner: Tristan und Isolde under Barenboim
- Wagner: The Duet Scenes (Tristan und Isolde) under Bertrand de Billy
- Wagner: Die Walküre under Thielemann (CD and DVD)
- Ioan Holender Farewell Concert (Gala from the Vienna State Opera) (DVD)
- Italian Arias (2001)
- Wagner Tenor Arias
- Vienna State Opera Gala (DVD)
- Wiener Staatsoper Live: Beethoven | Wagner | Strauss (issued Feb 2017, Orfeo International CD)
