= Brian Jagde =

American operatic tenor

Brian Jagde (born 1979) is an American operatic tenor. He has performed roles at leading opera houses throughout the world, including the San Francisco Opera, the Metropolitan Opera, the Royal Opera House, Lyric Opera of Chicago, Houston Grand Opera, Santa Fe Opera, Deutsche Oper Berlin, Wiener Staatsoper, Teatro Massimo, Teatro di San Carlo and the Teatro alla Scala.

== Early years ==
Brian Jagde was born on Long Island, New York, on August 21, 1979 and raised in Rockland County. He currently resides in New York City. Jagde began studying voice in college at the Purchase College Conservatory of Music, where he went on to obtain both bachelor's and master's degrees in voice. Although initially accepted as a tenor, Jagde trained as a baritone during this point in his career, only to switch back to his tenor voice under the guidance of voice teacher Michael Paul many years later. After switching to the tenor voice, Jagde joined the Merola Young Artist Program with the San Francisco Opera, and went on to join the company's Adler Fellowship program for three years. In 2012, Jagde won second prize in Plácido Domingo's Operalia Competition, as well as receiving the Birgit Nilsson Prize for Wagner-Strauss repertoire. Jagde was awarded top prize at the Loren L. Zachary Competition in 2014.

== Career ==
Jagde made his house debuts at Covent Garden as Lt. Pinkerton in Madama Butterfly, at Lyric Opera of Chicago as Cavaradossi in Tosca, at the Teatro di San Carlo as Don José in Carmen, as the Prince in Rusalka at Houston Grand Opera, at the Palau de les Arts Reina Sofía as Ismaele in Nabucco, as Pinkerton at the Teatro Massimo in Palermo, at Palm Beach Opera as Bacchus in Ariadne auf Naxos, and with the Ópera de Bellas Artes as Rodolfo in La bohème. He has also performed at San Francisco Opera as Cavaradossi in Tosca, Don José, and Pinkerton, and as Narraboth in Salome at Santa Fe Opera and Opera San Antonio.

Other engagements include his debuts at the Metropolitan Opera as Count Elemer in Arabella, Don José in Carmen at Opéra de Limoges, Cavaradossi at Santa Fe Opera and Deutsche Oper Berlin, Alfredo in La traviata at Opera Grand Rapids and with the Orlando Philharmonic Orchestra, Bacchus in Ariadne auf Naxos and Matteo in Arabella with Minnesota Opera, Rodolfo in La bohéme with Lorin Maazel and the Münchner Philharmoniker, at the Castleton Festival, and Syracuse Opera, Pinkerton at the Virginia Opera and Minnesota Opera, and his European debut as the title role in Werther and Macduff in Macbeth at the Teatr Wielki Opera Poznan in Poland. Jagde made his tenor recital debut in Davis, California, at the Mondavi Center in 2015, accompanied by pianist Craig Terry.

He has also performed at Opera New Jersey, Chautauqua Opera, Opera Company of the Highlands, and Des Moines Metro Opera.

He is a member of the advisory board for Time In Kids, a New York City-based non-profit organization. He is also an ambassador for Opera for Peace, a nonprofit that promotes equality, social justice and cultural diplomacy, and is active in charity work for the Kaufman Music Center Special Music School. He is married to publicity manager Jenna Wolf.
