= Alexander Vinogradov (bass) =

Russian opera singer

- Александр Виноградов
- Born: 1976 (age 49–50); Moscow
- Education: Moscow Conservatory
- Occupation: Operatic bass
- Organizations: Bolshoi Theatre
- Website: alexandervinogradovbass.com

Alexander Vinogradov (Russian: Александр Виноградов), born in 1976 in Moscow, is a Russian operatic bass who made an international career.

== Life and career ==
Vinogradov was born in Moscow in 1976. He began his music education at the age of 7, starting with the piano and the clarinet. From 1994 to 1995 he was a student at the Moscow State Technical University, also known as the Russian MIT. Vinogradov became a student of the Moscow Conservatory in 1995. While still a student at the Conservatory, he made his debut with the Bolshoi Theatre at the age of 21 as Oroveso in Bellini's Norma.

Vinogradov has worked with many leading conductors including Daniel Barenboim, Kent Nagano, Vladimir Jurowski, Lorin Maazel, Mariss Jansons, Zubin Mehta, Plácido Domingo, Valery Gergiev, Philippe Jordan, Antonio Pappano, Semyon Bychkov, Yuri Temirkhanov, Dmitri Kitayenko, Helmuth Rilling, Myung-Whun Chung and Yannick Nézet-Séguin.

His engagements have included Staatsoper Berlin, Bolshoi Theatre in Moscow, Opera National de Paris, Teatro alla Scala, Metropolitan Opera, Teatro Real Madrid, Royal Opera House Covent Garden, Palau des les Arts in Valencia, Arena di Verona, Teatro La Fenice, Staatsoper Hamburg, Bayerische Staatsoper, Semperoper Dresden, Teatro Massimo di Palermo, Opernhaus Zurich amongst other acclaimed opera houses around the world and international music festivals.

His extensive repertoire includes Escamillo in Bizet's Carmen, Filippo II in “Don Carlo”, Procida in “I Vespri Siciliani”, Silva in “Ernani”, Zaccaria in “Nabucco”, Pimen in “Boris Godunov”, Sarastro in “Die Zauberflöte”, Oroveso in “Norma”, Raimondo in “Lucia di Lammermoor”, Don Basilio in “Il Barbiere die Siviglia”, Daland in “Der Fliegender Holländer”, Banquo in “Macbeth”, Leporello in “Don Giovanni”, Il Conte Walter in “Luisa Miller”, Padre Guardiano in “La Forza del Destino”, Selim in “Il Turco in Italia”, Orest in “Elektra”, Colline in “La Boheme”, Timur in “Turandot”, Mephistopheles in “Faust” and “La Damnation de Faust”, Prince Gremin in “Eugene Onegin”, Lanceotto Malatesta in Rachmaninov’s “Francesca da Rimini” and title roles in “Le Nozze di Figaro”, “Attila” and “Aleko”.

On the concert podium, he has performed with the Staatskapelle Berlin, Simon Bolivar Youth Orchestra, Bayerischer Rundfunk, Deutsches Symphonie Orchester, RAI Torino, Orchestra Filarmonica della Scala, LA Symphony, Chicago Symphony, Montreal Symphony, Russian National Orchestra, Baltimore Symphony, Gürzenich Orchestra Cologne, Radio Philharmonic Orchestra in Amsterdam, RTÉ Symphony Orchestra, Konzerthaus Vienna and Berlin among others.

Vinogradov has an extensive discography including Shostakovich's 13th and 14th Symphony with Vasily Petrenko, Rachmaninov Songs accompanied by Iain Burnside (Delphian), Mahler's 8th Symphony with Gustavo Dudamel (Deutsche Gramophone), Rossini's Petite messe solennelle with Dantone and the Orchestre de Chambre de Paris (Naïve), Verdi's Luisa Miller from the La Fenice (Naxos) and Carmen from the Berlin State Opera (Euro Arts).
