= Matthew Polenzani =

American lyric tenor (born 1968)

Matthew Polenzani (born 1968) is an American lyric tenor. He has appeared with the Metropolitan Opera, Seattle Opera, Royal Opera House, Bayerische Staatsoper, Lyric Opera of Chicago, Vienna State Opera, and San Francisco Opera, among others. He has also sung with numerous symphony orchestras. His younger sister is independent folk musician Rose Polenzani. His grandfather is Lynn Hauldren, known as the "Empire Guy".

== Early life ==
Born in Evanston, Illinois, Polenzani earned a bachelor's degree from Eastern Illinois University in 1991, and a master's from the Yale School of Music where he studied with Richard Cross and Doris Yarick-Cross (chair of Yale's opera department) in 1994. After graduating from Yale, he began studying with Margaret Harshaw. He then went on to be a member of the Lyric Opera Center for American Artists, now the Ryan Opera Center, with the Lyric Opera of Chicago. After Ms. Harshaw's death in 1997, he began studying with his current teacher, Laura Brooks Rice, another student of Ms. Harshaw, in 1998, with whom he continues to study today.

== Career ==
Polenzani made his debut at the Metropolitan Opera in 1997, in Boris Godunov. He has since gone on to give more than 300 performances in over 20 roles with that company, including Ferrando in Così fan tutte, Tamino in The Magic Flute, Il Duca in Rigoletto, David in Die Meistersinger von Nürnberg, Nemorino in L'elisir d'amore and the title role in Roberto Devereux.

Polenzani made his debut in the title role of Verdi's Don Carlos (sung in French) at the Metropolitan Opera on 28 February 2022 in a new production by David McVicar conducted by Yannick Nézet-Séguin with Sonya Yoncheva as Élisabeth, Jamie Barton as Eboli, Étienne Dupuis as Rodrigue, and Eric Owens as Philip II. Zachary Woolfe of The New York Times stated that Polenzani gave "a triumphant turn in the title role ... not the swaggering, trumpeting Franco Corelli-style tenor generally associated with the part — though he rises, stylishly, to fiery intensity — but rather a vocalist of refinement, inwardness and melancholy." The performance of 26 March 2022 was simulcast as part of the Met Opera Live in HD series and is available for streaming at Met Opera on Demand.

Making his European debut as Gérald in Delibes' Lakmé with Opéra national de Bordeaux in France in 1998, he has also appeared in productions of Don Pasquale and La traviata at the Teatro Comunale in Florence, on a tour of Japan with Turin’s Teatro Regio, I Capuleti e i Montecchi at the Paris Opera, L'elisir d’amore at the Vienna State Opera as well as the Bavarian State Opera, Naples' Teatro San Carlo and Rome Opera; Così fan tutte at Covent Garden with Sir Colin Davis and in Paris with Philippe Jordan; Lucia di Lammermoor at Frankfurt Opera and Paris Opera, La Damnation de Faust in Frankfurt and Berlin, "La Bohème" at Gran Teatre del Liceu and Manon at Covent Garden and La Scala.

Polenzani won the Richard Tucker Award in 2004, as well as the Beverly Sills Award in 2008. He is married to fellow Yale alumna mezzo-soprano Rosa Maria Pascarella and they have three children.
