= Lucas Meachem =

American lyric baritone (born 1978)

- Born: John Lucas Meachem; June 11, 1978 (age 48)
- Citizenship: United States
- Occupation: Lyric baritone
- Known for: performing the role of Figaro in 2016 Los Angeles Opera's Ghosts of Versailles
- Website: lucasmeachem.com

John Lucas Meachem (born June 11, 1978), known professionally as Lucas Meachem, is an American lyric baritone best known for performing the role of Figaro in 2016 Los Angeles Opera's Ghosts of Versailles which earned him a Grammy Award.

== Early life ==
Lucas Meachem was born and raised in Carthage, North Carolina and grew up singing karaoke before discovering opera. Meachem trained at the Adler Program artist residency at the San Francisco Opera from 2004 to 2005. He had his big break soon after that in 2006, when he was discovered at a karaoke bar in Paris by acclaimed mezzo-soprano Susan Graham, who suggested he step in for Gluck’s Iphigénie en Tauride at the Lyric Opera of Chicago from which the international star baritone Simon Keenlyside had withdrawn.

== Career ==
Meachem made his Metropolitan Opera debut as General Rayevsky in War and Peace in 2008, and has since performed at the Met as Mercutio in Roméo et Juliette, Silvio in Pagliacci, Marcello in La bohème. He most recently sang the role of Sharpless in Madama Butterfly.

In 2014, Meachem sang the title role in Rossini's Guillaume Tell with Wichita Grand Opera at Century II Performing Arts & Convention Center in Wichita, Kansas. The production also featured Michael Spyres as Arnold, Zvetelina Vassileva as Mathilde and Nayden Todorov as conductor.

In 2016, Meachem won a Grammy for Los Angeles Opera's Ghosts of Versailles as Figaro. Also in 2016, Meachem was voted as the inaugural Emerging Star by San Francisco Opera.

In 2021, Meachem performed the role of Figaro in an abridged English-language adaptation of The Barber of Seville for the San Francisco Opera. The production was held as an open-air, drive-in event at the Marin Center due to the COVID-19 pandemic.

== Personal life ==
Meachem is married to pianist/opera coach, Irina Meachem. They have a son, and live in Minneapolis.

== Discography ==
=== CD ===
Bernstein: A Quiet Place (Juno Award for Classical Album of the Year – Vocal or Choral Performance)

- Released: June 22, 2018
- Format: Audio CD
- Label: Decca Music Group Ltd.

The Ghosts of Versailles (GRAMMY WINNER, 59TH AWARDS: Best Opera Recording & Best Engineered Album, Classical)

- Released: February 19, 2016
- Format: Audio CD
- Label: Pentatone

Tchaikovsky: Iolanta (Slovenian Philharmonic Orchestra/ Emmanuel Villaume)

- Released: November 27, 2014
- Format: Audio CD
- Label: Deutsche Grammophon

Der Zigeunerprimas (Ohio Light Opera Orchestra)

- Format: Audio CD
- Label: Albany Records

=== DVD ===
Dido and Aeneas [Blu-ray] (Actors: Christopher Hogwood, Sarah Connolly, Lucas Meachem, Lucy Crowe, Sara Fulgoni)

- Released: November 17, 2009
- Format: DVD
- Label: Opus Arte
- Director: Wayne McGregor, Jonathan Haswell

== See also ==
- Ghosts of Versailles
- Grammy Award for Best Opera Recording
- 59th Annual Grammy Awards
- Phoenicia International Festival of the Voice
- Metropolitan Opera
- La bohème
