= Marco Armiliato =

Italian musician

- Born: 1967 (age 58–59); Genoa, Italy
- Education: Niccolò Paganini Conservatory
- Occupations: Conductor; Pianist
- Awards: Grammy Award

Marco Armiliato (born 1967) is an Italian opera conductor who has made an international career at leading opera houses.

== Life and career ==
Born in Genoa in 1967, Armiliato graduated in piano from the Niccolò Paganini Conservatory in Genoa. After working for a few years as a piano master in several opera houses, he debuted as a conductor in 1989 in Lima, with Gaetano Donizetti's opera L'elisir d'amore. He has since conducted in numerous opera houses around the world, including the Bayerische Staatsoper, Deutsche Oper Berlin, the Royal Opera House Covent Garden, Opéra National de Paris, Opernhaus Zürich, Teatro Real de Madrid, Liceu in Barcelona, Teatro Regio in Turin, Teatro dell'Opera in Rome, and Verona Arena. He has over 80 operas in his repertoire.

At the Metropolitan Opera in New York he has conducted over 500 performances, second only to former music director James Levine in the 21st century. He has conducted there works by Verdi (Il Trovatore, Aida, Rigoletto, Macbeth, and Stiffelio), Puccini (La Bohème, Madama Butterfly, and Turandot), Donizetti, and others since his debut in 1998.

At the San Francisco Opera he conducted La Bohème, Madama Butterfly, Turandot, La Traviata, Tosca, Aida, La Favorita, Il Trovatore and Cavalleria Rusticana.

At Vienna State Opera he conducted Saint-Saëns' Samson et Dalila and Il trovatore, after Fedora, Il barbiere di Siviglia, La Favorita, Jérusalem, Andrea Chénier, Cavalleria Rusticana, I Pagliacci, Verdi's Stiffelio, La Traviata, Puccini's Manon Lescaut, Tosca and Turandot, and Bizet's Carmen. He is an honorary member of the company. In 2019 he conducted the opening of the Vienna Opera Ball.

Armiliao conducted the Orchestra Sinfonica Di Milano Giuseppe Verdi accompanying Renée Fleming on her album, Verismo Arias, which won the Grammy Award for Best Classical Vocal Performance at the 52nd Annual Grammy Awards for 2009.

He is the younger brother of the tenor Fabio Armiliato.
