= Željko Lučić =

Serbian operatic baritone (born 1968)

- Born: 24 February 1968 (age 58); Zrenjanin, SR Serbia, Yugoslavia
- Occupation: Opera singer baritone

Željko Lučić (born 24 February 1968), is a Serbian operatic baritone who has had an active international career since 1993. He was a member of the Serbian National Theatre in Novi Sad from 1993 to 1998 and at the Frankfurt Opera from 1998 to 2008. He is particularly well known for his performances in the operas of Giuseppe Verdi; having portrayed a total of 23 leading roles from the great composer's works.

== Early life and education ==
Born in Zrenjanin, Lučić was a member of conductor Slobodan Bursać's Josif Marinković Mixed Choir in his native city while he was a teenager. Bursać encouraged him to pursue a career as a soloist and encouraged him to study singing with Dorotea Spasić in Belgrade. After studying for some years with Spasić, his teacher sent him to the voice studio of the famous mezzo-soprano Biserka Cvejić at the Music Academy in Novi Sad in 1991. Cvejić became his primary teacher and mentor, and in less than two years studying with her, he was offered a contract with the Serbian National Theatre in Novi Sad. In 1995 he won first prize at the international music competition in Bečej, and in 1997 he won first prize at the Francisco Viñas International Singing Competition in Barcelona.

== Career ==
Lučić made his professional opera debut in April 1993 as Silvio in Ruggero Leoncavallo's Pagliacci at the Serbian National Theatre in Novi Sad. He was soon seen at that theatre as Belcore in Gaetano Donizetti's L'elisir d'amore, Enrico in Donizetti's Lucia di Lammermoor, Germont in Giuseppe Verdi's La traviata, Lionel in Pyotr Ilyich Tchaikovsky's The Maid of Orleans, Valentin in Charles Gounod's Faust and the title role in Tchaikovsky's Eugene Onegin.

In 1998 Lučić joined the roster of principal artists at the Frankfurt Opera where he remained committed through 2008. There he sang a broad repertoire, but drew particular acclaim as a Verdi baritone. Some of the Verdi roles which he has sung in Frankfurt are Amonasro in Aida, the Count di Luna in Il trovatore, Ezio in Attila, Germont, Guy de Montfort in Les vêpres siciliennes, and Renato in Un ballo in maschera. Other roles which he has sung with that opera company are The Duke of Nottingham in Donizetti's Roberto Devereux, Count Almaviva in Wolfgang Amadeus Mozart's The Marriage of Figaro, Eugene Onegin, Lescaut in Giacomo Puccini's Manon Lescaut, Marcello in Puccini's La bohème, Michonnet in Francesco Cilea's Adriana Lecouvreur, Prince Ivan-Korolevich in Nikolai Rimsky-Korsakov's Kashchey the Deathless, Sharpless in Puccini's Madama Butterfly, and Simone in Mozart's La finta semplice among others.

Lučić has also appeared as a guest artist with numerous major opera houses internationally. He made his debut at the De Nederlandse Opera in 2002 in the roles of Guy de Montfort and Marcello. He sang Germont for his first appearance at the Aix-en-Provence Festival in 2003 and that same year sang the Count di Luna for his debut at the Teatro Comunale Florence.

In 2006 he made his debut at the Metropolitan Opera as Barnaba in Amilcare Ponchielli's La Gioconda with Violeta Urmana in the title role and Bertrand de Billy conducting. He has since returned to that house as Verdi's Germont, Michele in Puccini's Il tabarro, and in the title roles of Verdi's Macbeth and Verdi's Rigoletto. He was scheduled to return to the Met for the 2010–11 season as Rigoletto and the Count di Luna. In October 2015, he performed as Iago in Verdi’s Otello at the Met and more recently as Scarpia in Tosca. At the Vienna State Opera he sang Giorgio Germont, Simon Boccanegra, Don Carlo in La forza del destino, Nabucco and Scarpia.

He replaced Plácido Domingo in the 2019 Metropolitan Opera production of Macbeth after accusations of sexual harassment.
