= Maurizio Benini =

Italian conductor and composer

Maurizio Benini (born 1952) is an Italian conductor and composer. He made his debut in 1998 in L'elisir d'amore at the Teatro Comunale di Bologna. Gramophone notes his "spirit and finesse" at conducting. He has also conducted opera performances at La Scala, the Lyric Opera of Chicago, the Metropolitan Opera, the Paris Opera, The Royal Opera, the Vienna State Opera, and the Wexford Festival Opera among others.
