= Il trittico =

Collection of operas by Giacomo Puccini

- Triptych of one-act operas by Giacomo Puccini
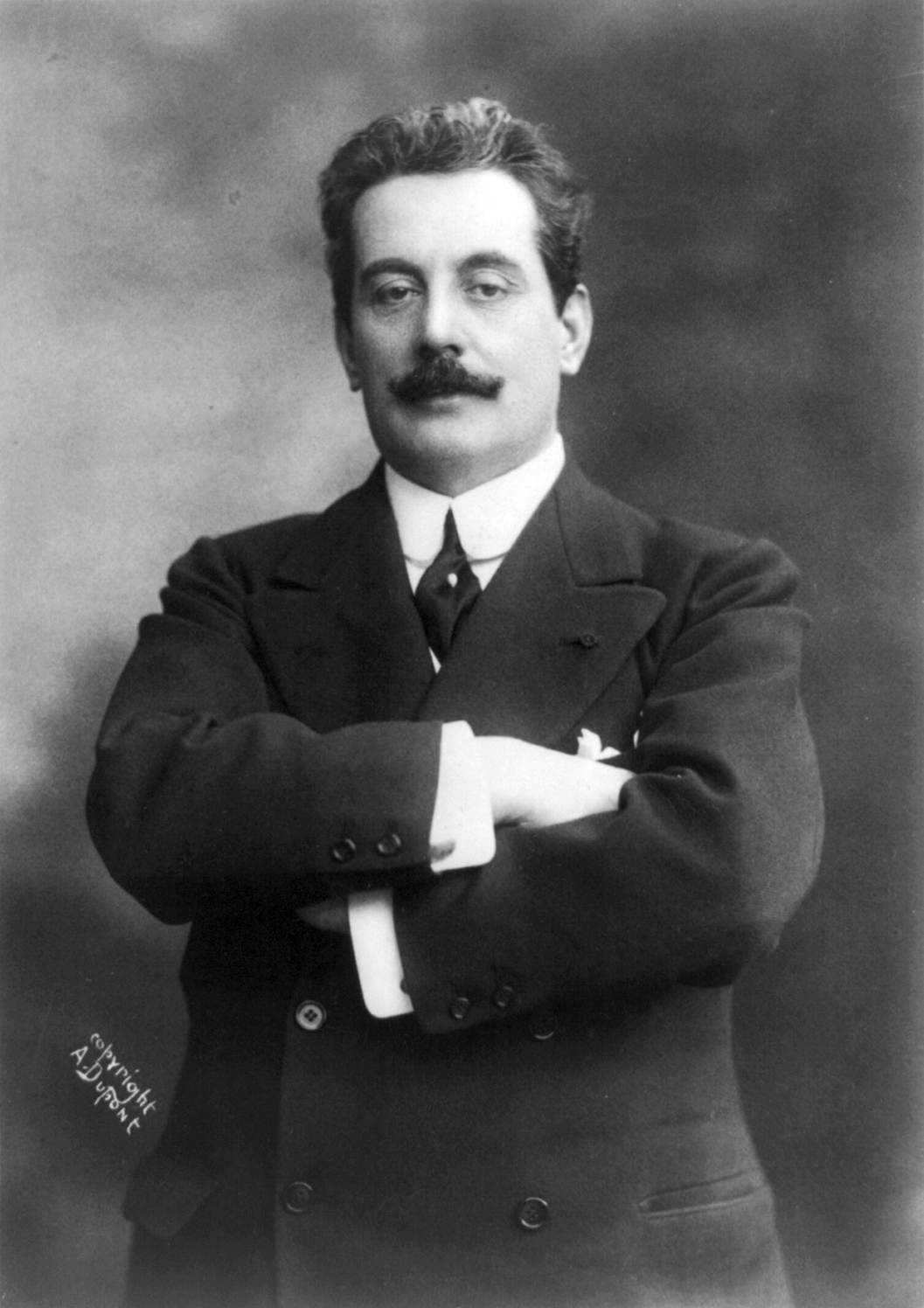
- The composer
- Language: Italian
- Premiere: 14 December 1918; Metropolitan Opera

Il trittico (The Triptych) is the title of a collection of three one-act operas, Il tabarro, Suor Angelica, and Gianni Schicchi, by Giacomo Puccini. The work received its world premiere at the Metropolitan Opera on 14 December 1918.

== Background ==
Around 1904, Puccini first began planning a set of one-act operas, largely because of the success of Pietro Mascagni's Cavalleria rusticana. Originally, he planned to write each opera to reflect one of the parts of Dante's Divine Comedy. However, he eventually based only Gianni Schicchi on Dante's epic poem. The link in the final work is that each opera deals with the concealment of a death.

Puccini also intended that the three should be performed as a set, and wrote to Casa Ricordi to complain about their giving permission in 1920 to The Royal Opera, London, "for Tabarro and Schicchi without Angelica". He reluctantly agreed that the two operas could be given in a programme with Serge Diaghilev's Ballets Russes, but when he heard that Il tabarro had also been dropped, he wrote to his friend Sybil Seligman to say "I very much dislike Trittico being given in bits – I gave permission for two operas, and not one, in conjunction with the Russian Ballet."

Today, it is quite common to see only one or two of the trittico operas performed in an evening, and sometimes one of them may be paired with another one-act opera by a different composer.

== Performance history ==
The operas premiered at the Metropolitan Opera on 14 December 1918. The critical reviews for Il trittico were mixed; most critics agreed that Gianni Schicchi was the best of the three operas.

Il trittico premiered in Rome on 11 January 1919. Puccini, who had not been present for the New York premiere, attended the production at the Rome Opera House. The Rome production, especially Gianni Schicchi, received positive reviews. Later that year, the triptych was staged at the Teatro Colón in Buenos Aires (25 June) with Tullio Serafin conducting and in Chicago (6 December). After these initial premieres, most opera companies began to perform the operas separately; Gianni Schicchi would eventually become the most frequently performed of the set.

A critically acclaimed production at the Metropolitan Opera opened on 20 April 2007, directed by Jack O'Brien and was broadcast on television by PBS's Great Performances at the Met series. In this production Il tabarro was moved from 1910 to 1927, Suor Angelica was moved from the 17th century to 1938, and Gianni Schicchi was moved from 1299 to 1959.

== Synopses ==
A complete synopsis of each opera may be found in their individual articles

=== Il tabarro ===
Place: A barge on the Seine in Paris.
Time: 1910.

The opera is dark and brooding, with the violence and grit associated with verismo opera.

=== Suor Angelica ===
Place: A convent near Siena.
Time: The latter part of the 17th century.

This second opera, Puccini's personal favorite (but usually the one to be omitted if only two of the operas are performed), is about religious redemption.

=== Gianni Schicchi ===
Place: Florence.
Time: 1299.

The third opera, a farce, is the most popular.
