= Nicola Luisotti =

Italian conductor

- Born: 26 November 1961 (age 64); Viareggio, Province of Lucca, Italy
- Occupation: Conductor
- Years active: 2002–present
- Labels: Deutsche Gramophone, EMI, Dynamic, Arte Nova
- Website: www.nicolaluisotti.com

Nicola Luisotti (born 26 November 1961, in Viareggio, Italy) is an Italian conductor. He currently holds the title "Director Principal Invitado" (principal guest conductor) of Madrid's Teatro Real.

== Biography ==
Luisotti grew up in Bargecchia. He began studying music as a child, with lessons on the church organ. A seminary student until age 14, he was the director of his village church choir by age 11. He later trained as a pianist, with secondary degrees in composition, trumpet and voice. Upon completing his formal study, he traveled between Milan, where he was a rehearsal pianist for La Scala, and Florence, where he was a member of the chorus of the Maggio Musicale Fiorentino. Subsequent posts allowed him to assist such conductors as Lorin Maazel and Riccardo Muti at La Scala. His earliest full-time position was as chorus master for La Fenice in Venice.

Luisotti's first professional opera conducting engagements were a 2000 production of Stiffelio in Trieste and a 2001 Staatstheater Stuttgart production of Il trovatore. Luisotti became Stuttgart's main conductor for the Italian repertory, conducting Tosca, Turandot, Madama Butterfly and Otello in 2006. His Stuttgart Il trovatore was met with critical acclaim, and within weeks he was offered a debut engagement at Paris Opera. Other early invitations came from the Canadian Opera Company (Un ballo in maschera in 2003), Genoa's Teatro Carlo Felice (Il viaggio a Reims in 2003 and Simon Boccanegra in 2004), and Munich's Bavarian State Opera (Tosca in 2004). He made his debut in Japan with a staged production of Tosca at Suntory Hall.

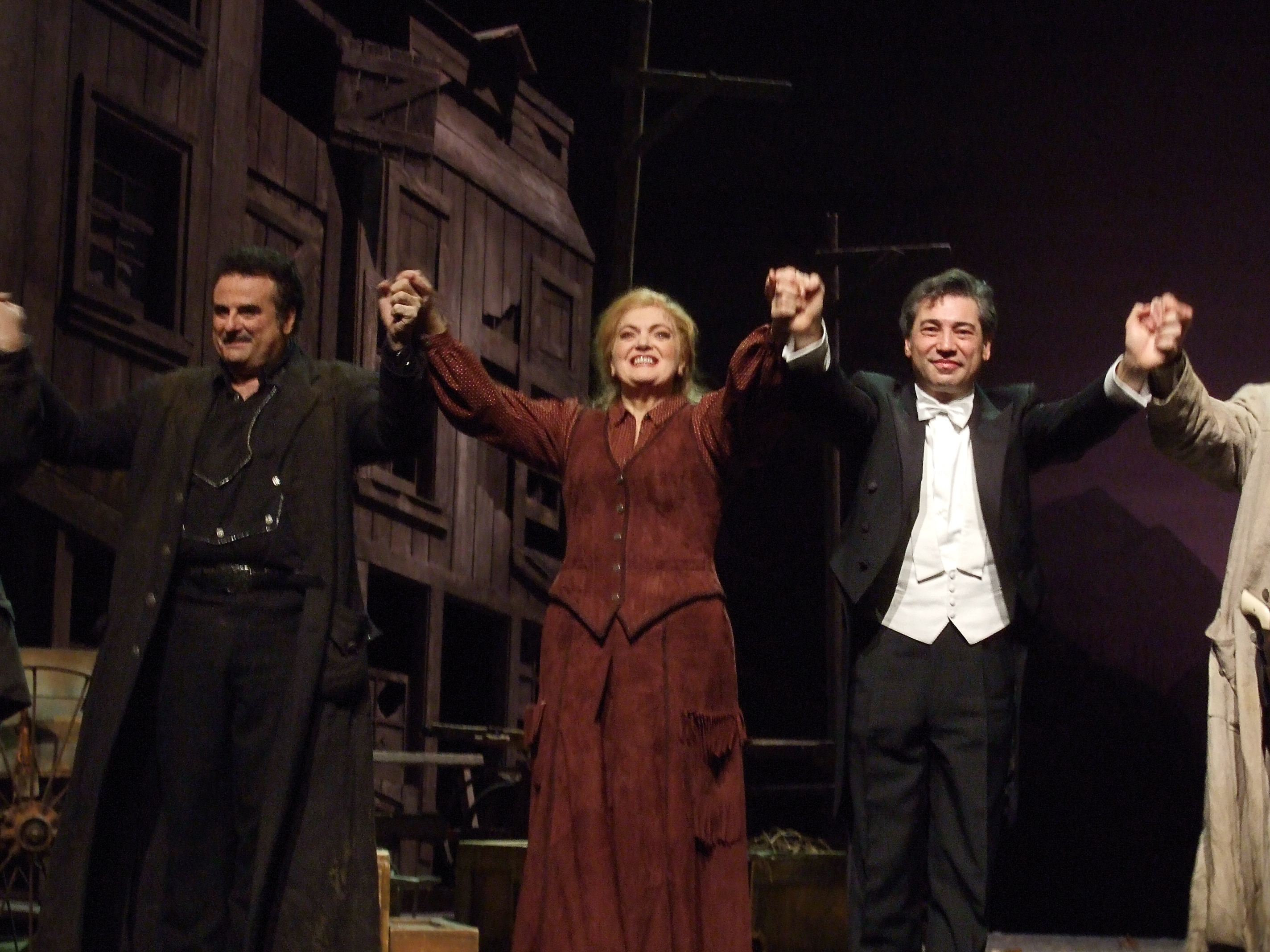
Marcello Giordani, Elisabete Matos, Nicola Luisotti - Curtain Call

Luisotti made his San Francisco Opera debut in 2005 conducting La forza del destino. In January 2007, the company announced his appointment as its third music director, effective with the 2009-2010 season, with an initial contract of 5 years. His work at San Francisco Opera has included conducting the premiere of Marco Tutino's La Ciociara (Two Women). In May 2016, the company announced that Luisotti was to conclude his music directorship of San Francisco Opera after the 2017-2018 season.

Luisotti led the 100th-anniversary performances of La fanciulla del West at the Metropolitan Opera and was presented with the Premio Puccini Prize by the Fondazione Festival Puccini. He served as music director of the Teatro di San Carlo in Naples from February 2012 to December 2014. He served as principal guest conductor of the Tokyo Symphony Orchestra from April 2009 to the spring of 2012.

Luisotti's discography includes a complete recording of Stiffelio and Duets, featuring Anna Netrebko and Rolando Villazón on the Deutsche Grammophon label. He is the conductor for a DVD recording of the Met's La bohème, starring Angela Gheorghiu and Ramón Vargas (EMI), and their centennial production of La fanciulla del West (Deutsche Grammophon).

Luisotti and his wife, Rita Simonini, have residences near Corsanico, Italy, where Simonini grew up and where the couple married, and in San Francisco.

Cultural offices
Preceded by Donald Runnicles	Music Director, San Francisco Opera; 2009–2018	Succeeded by Eun-sun Kim (designate, effective August 2021)
Preceded by Jeffrey Tate	Music Director, Teatro di San Carlo; 2012–2014	Succeeded by Juraj Valcuha
