= Bertrand de Billy =

French conductor

Bertrand de Billy (born Paris, 11 January 1965) is a French and Swiss conductor.

He attended a Jesuit school, but only started serious musical studies when he was around 14–15; he studied piano and violin.

After his career as an instrumental musician, de Billy began his conducting career in Paris. He later moved to Germany and built up his career as an opera conductor. His professional operatic conducting debut was for Verdi's La Traviata in Oviedo, Spain, in 1991, replacing a conductor at short notice. He was the Generalmusikdirektor (GMD) at the Anhaltisches Theater in Dessau from 1993 to 1995. At the Vienna Volksoper, he held the post of first conductor from 1996 to 1998. From 1999 to 2004, de Billy was chief conductor of the Gran Teatre del Liceu in Barcelona, after the reopening of the theatre.

De Billy conducts mostly from memory, although he usually has the score in front of him in case problems occur. He prefers the smaller opera theatres (Theater an der Wien, Châtelet, Garnier), where more intimacy can be found with the audience.

Since 2002, de Billy has served as chief conductor of the Vienna Radio Symphony Orchestra (RSO Wien). His performances with the orchestra have included opera productions at the OsterKlang festival and at the summer festival KlangBogen Wien. His recordings with the RSO Wien have included Eugen d'Albert's Tiefland. De Billy has had disputes with management over funding and the continuing status of the orchestra. In January 2009, the RSO Wien announced the appointment of Cornelius Meister as its seventh chief conductor, effective with the 2010–2011 season.

== Honors ==
=== France ===
- Officier de la Légion d'honneur
- Chevalier de l'ordre national du Mérite
- Chevalier de l'ordre des Arts et des Lettres

=== Austria ===
- Goldenes Ehrenzeichen für Verdienste um die Republik Österreich

== Discographie ==
CD symphonique https://debilly.com/cd-recordings/ [archive]

CD Opéra https://debilly.com/cd-opera-works/ [archive]

DVD https://debilly.com/dvd-blue-ray-releases/ [archive]

Cultural offices
Preceded by Uwe Mund	Music Director, Gran Teatre del Liceu; 1999–2004	Succeeded by Sebastian Weigle
Preceded by Dennis Russell Davies	Chief Conductor, Vienna Radio Symphony Orchestra; 2002–2010	Succeeded by Cornelius Meister
