= Quartet Skaz =

Russian musical ensemble

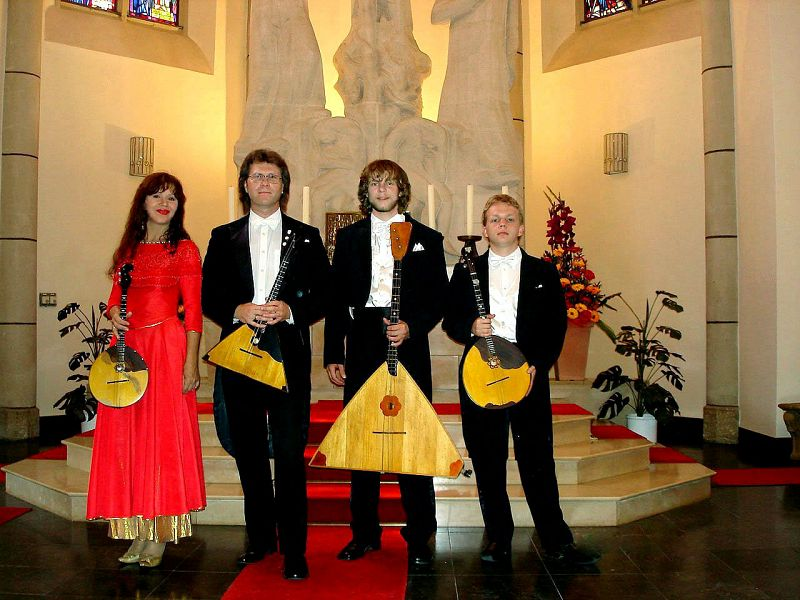

Background information
- Origin: Moscow, Russia
- Genres: Russian folk, classical, other
- Occupation: Chamber ensemble
- Years active: 1973–present
- Labels: Melodiya; PAN Records; Russian Disc; Masherbrum Art
- Website: www.skaz1.com

Quartet Skaz (Russian: Квартет «Сказ») is a concert quartet employing Russian folk instruments: the prima domra, prima balalaika, alto domra, and bass balalaika.

== History ==
Founded in 1973, Quartet Skaz pioneered instrumental chamber performance on Russian folk instruments in the USSR. Since then, the Quartet has actively promoted both Russian folk and classical music. Quartet Skaz’s recordings include several LP’s and three CD’s, as well as many recordings for radio and television. In 1989, the Quartet recorded Balastroika, the first CD in Soviet music, produced by PAN Records. In 1994, Quartet Skaz participated in the recording of the soundtrack of the film Catherine the Great (USA), with a symphony orchestra with musicians from Germany, Hungary and the US. Later in 1995, Skaz performed for the soundtrack of the film The Adventures of Young Indiana Jones: Travels with Father (USA). In 2000, Quartet Skaz recorded 14 pieces for an international folk dance project. Russian Disk produced the Quartet’s next CD, Skaz, Russian Folk Quartet, in 2009.

In the words of Irina Arkhipova, “through its creative and social efforts, the Quartet [Skaz] has achieved great recognition and popularity among a wide audience of music lovers." For Joseph Kobzon, Quartet Skaz is characterized by “a unique sound, impeccable taste, and extraordinary breadth and diversity of performance.”

== Awards ==
Quartet Skaz received the Lenin Komsomol Prize in 1985 "for great mastery in performance and promotion of folk-music creativity among the youth", and is a laureate of the First Moscow Competition for Performing Artists.

== Discography ==
=== Compact discs ===
- Quartet Skaz, "Balastroika", 1989, PAN Records, The Netherlands, PAN-139-CD.
- Quartet Skaz, "Skaz, Russian Folk Quartet", 2009, Russian Disc, Moscow, RD-CD-00858.
- Quartet Skaz, "Tea from a Samovar", 2017, Masherbrum Art, Addison, MA-54.

=== Other albums and recordings ===
- "The Losers’ Ensemble", Musical Film, 1976. Featured in the film are Alla Pugacheva, G. Leybel and V. Nikolsky, and Quartet Skaz.
- Quartet Skaz, "Oh, you night!" (Ах, Ты Вечер), LP, 1976, Melodiya, Moscow, C22-07257-58.
- "Snow House" (Снежный дом), dramatization of fairytale by A. N. Tolstoy, LP, 1977, Melodiya, Moscow.
- Quartet Skaz, "Russian Lubok" (Русский Лубок), LP, 1977, Melodiya, Moscow, C20-08997-8.
- Quartet Skaz, "Skaz: Quartet of Russian Folk Instruments" (Квартет русских народных инструментов "Сказ"), LP, 1979, Melodiya, Moscow, C20-11839/08998.
- Quartet Skaz, "Kalinushka" (Калинушка), LP, 1980, Melodiya, Moscow, C20—14835-36.
- "The Magic Apple" (Волшебное яблочко), dramatization of a story written and directed by O. Anofriev, with L. Larina and Quartet Skaz, LP, 1980, Melodiya, Moscow.
- Quartet Skaz, "Around the World" (Вокруг Света), LP, 1983, Melodiya, Moscow, C20-19457-003.
- Quartet Skaz, The Best of Quartet Skaz" (Лучшее Из Репертуара Квартета "Сказ"), LP, 1990, Melodiya, Moscow, C20 29229 001.
