= Michel Fokine =

Russian choreographer (1880–1942)

Michael Fokine
- Михаил Фокин
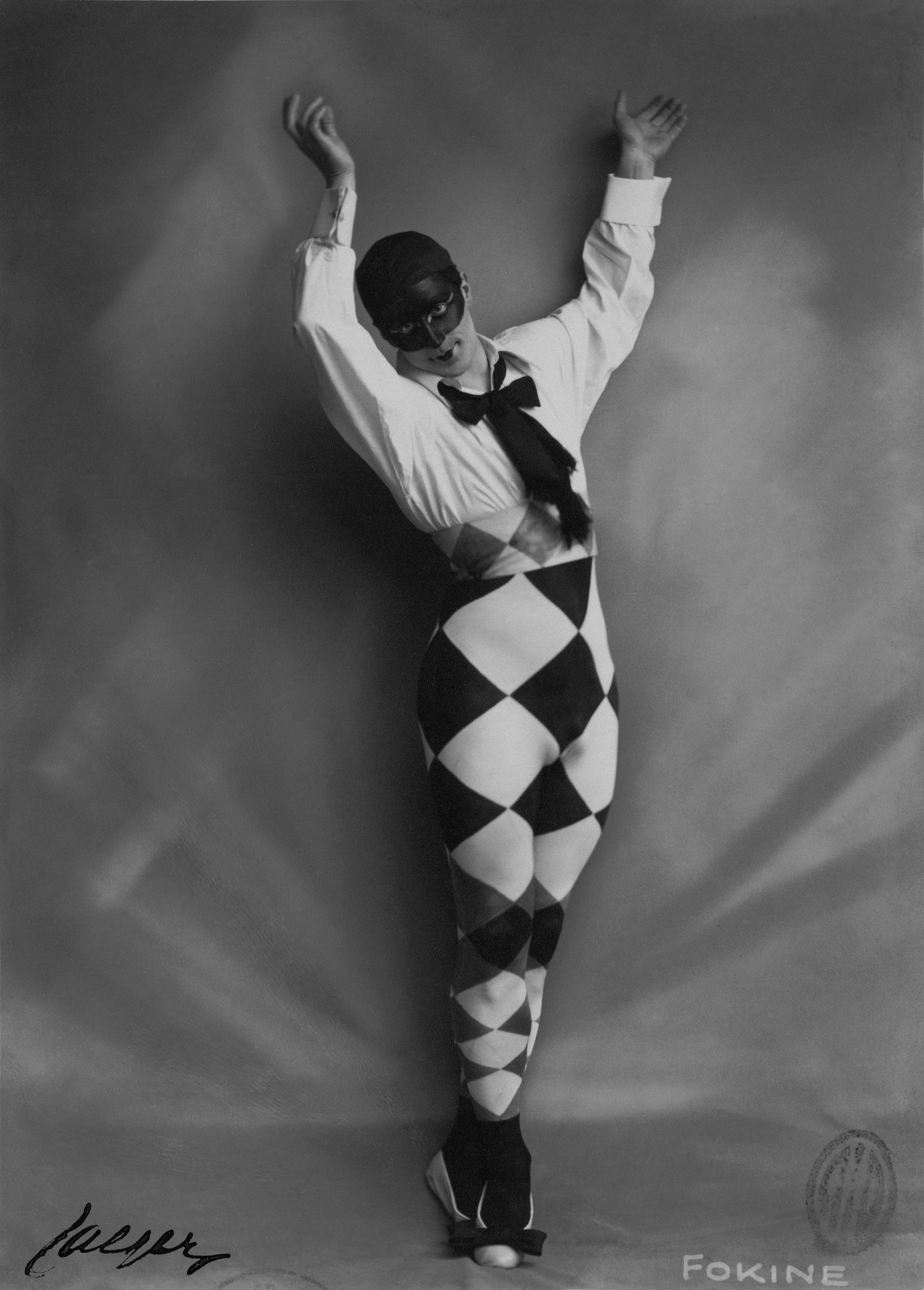
- Fokine in Arlequin, 1914
- Born: Mikhail Mikhaylovich Fokin; 23 April 1880; Saint Petersburg, Russia
- Died: 22 August 1942 (aged 62); New York City, U.S.
- Citizenship: Russian, naturalized U.S.
- Occupations: Ballet dancer; choreographer
- Spouse: Vera Fokina

Michael Fokine (Note: French transliteration Michel Fokine; English transliteration Mikhail Fokin; Russian: Михаил Михайлович Фокин, Mikhail Mikhaylovich Fokin) (23 April [O.S. 11 April] 1880 – 22 August 1942) was a Russian choreographer and dancer.

== Career ==
=== Early years ===
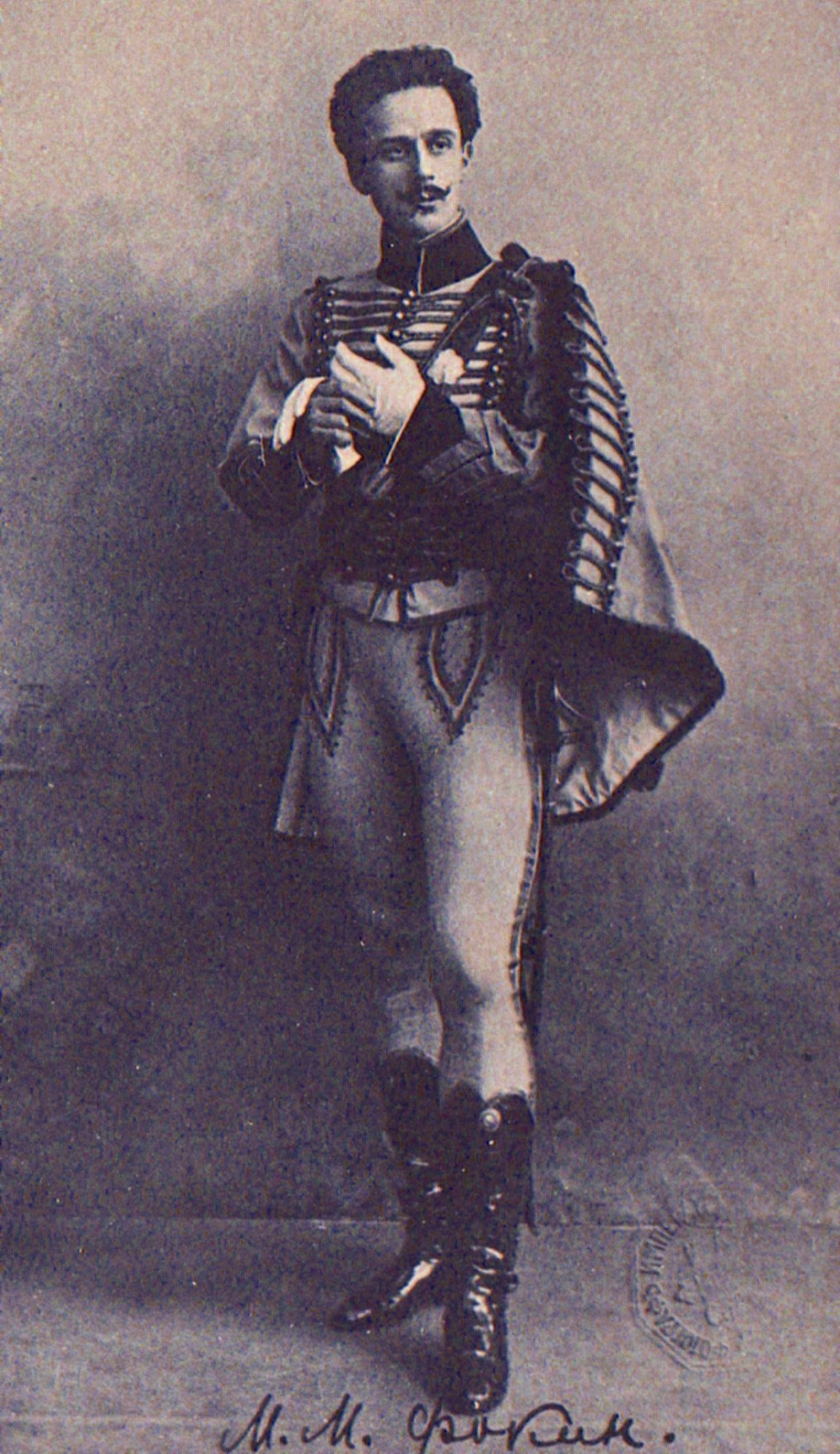
Fokine costumed for the role of Lucien d'Hervilly, in Marius Petipa's 1905 production of the ballet Paquita

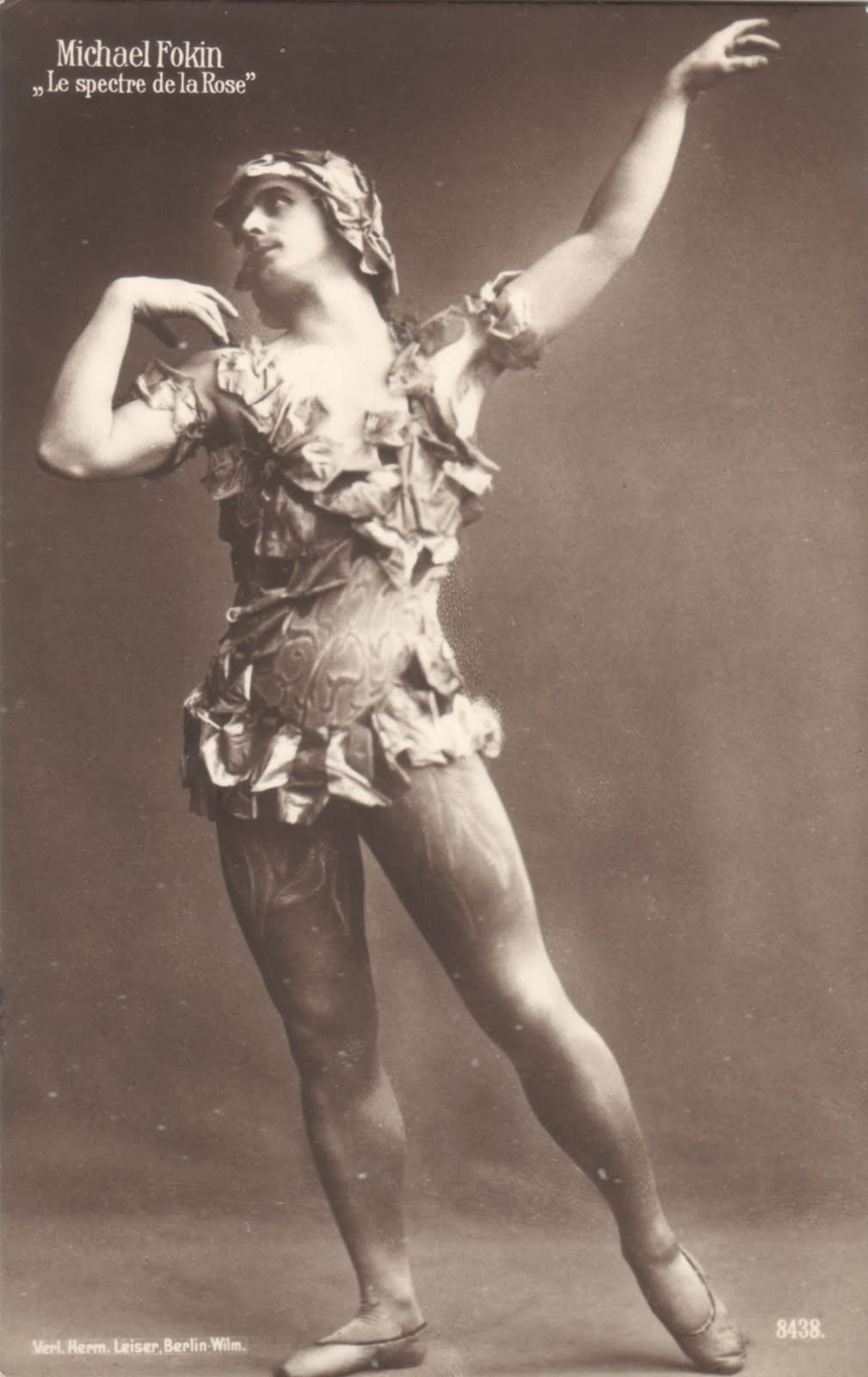
Fokine as the spectre in a 1914 production of the Ballets Russes' Le Spectre de la rose

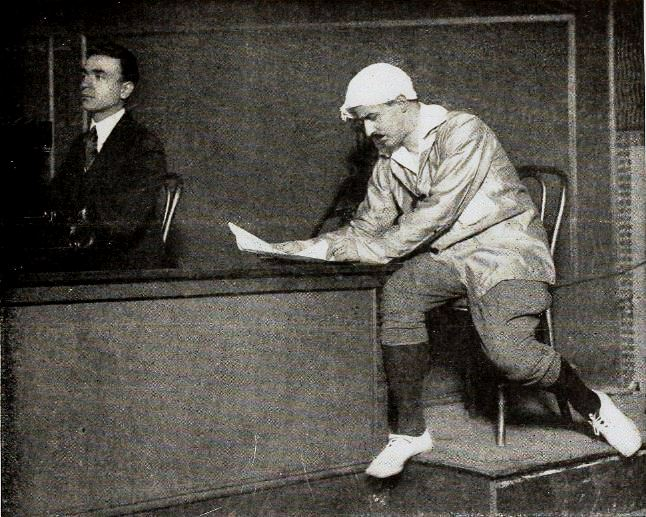
Fokine directing the rehearsals of the ballet Aphrodite in 1919

Fokine was born in Saint Petersburg to a prosperous merchant and at the age of 9 was accepted into the Saint Petersburg Imperial Ballet School. That same year, he made his performing debut in The Talisman under the direction of Marius Petipa. In 1898, on his 18th birthday, he debuted on the stage of the Imperial Mariinsky Theatre in Paquita, with the Imperial Russian Ballet. In addition to being a talented dancer, Fokine was also passionate about painting and displayed talent in this area as well. He also played musical instruments, including mandolin (played on stage in ensemble led by Ginislao Paris), domra, and balalaika (played in Vasily Andreyev's Great Russian Orchestra).

=== Transition to choreographer ===
He became frustrated with the life of a dancer and began considering other paths, including painting. In 1902, he was offered a teaching position at the Imperial Ballet School and was able to explore the artistic possibilities of choreography. In 1905, he created his first full-length ballet, Acis et Galatée, which was performed by his students and based on a Sicilian legend. Among his students were Desha Delteil and Bronislava Nijinska.

Some of Fokine's early works include the ballet Acis and Galatea (1905) and The Dying Swan (1907), which was a solo dance for Anna Pavlova choreographed to the music of Le Cygne. Acis and Galetea included an acrobatic dance with young boys playing fauns, one of whom was Vaslav Nijinsky. Fokine later featured Nijinsky in ballets including Chopiniana (1907), which was renamed Les Sylphides in 1909.

=== Ballets Russes ===
In 1909, Sergei Diaghilev invited Fokine to become the resident choreographer of the first season of the Ballets Russes in Paris. At Ballets Russes, he collaborated with other artists to create a ballet of Nikolai Rimsky-Korsakov's Scheherazade, which premiered in 1910. The ballet was inspired by symphonic poems composed by Rimsky-Korsakov and the tale of the 1001 Nights. The sets designed by Léon Bakst matched the sexualized choreography. Despite the lack of historical accuracy, the ballet was successful due to its brilliant colors, exoticism, and sexual overtones. The 1910 production featured Nijinsky in the role of the Golden Slave.

The Firebird (1910), with music composed by Igor Stravinsky was also created by a "committee," a process inspired by the Wagnerian notion of Gesamtkunstwerk, which is the synthesis of elements such as music, drama, spectacle, and dance to create a more cohesive artwork. Petrushka (1912), with music also composed by Stravinsky and set design by Alexandre Benois Petrouchka, was inspired by the Russian puppet which traditionally appeared at the Butter Week (Shrovetide) Fairs. In this ballet, Fokine included street dancers, peddlers, nursemaids, a performing bear, and a large ensemble of characters to complement the plot. The story was centered on the sinister Magician (Enrico Cecchetti) and his three puppets: Petrouchka (Nijinsky), the Ballerina (Tamara Karsavina) and the savage Moor (Alexander Orlov). Fokine's ballet Le Spectre de la Rose (1911) showcased Nijinsky as the spirit of the rose given to a young girl. Nijinsky's exit featured a grand jeté out of the young girl's bedroom window, timed so the audience would last see him suspended in mid-air. In 1912, Fokine created an adaptation of Daphnis et Chloé.

He left Ballets Russes in 1912. In 1914, Diaghilev convinced Fokine to return to Ballets Russes, where he then created the ballets Midas, Josephslegende, and Le Coq d'Or. The Paris premiere of The Golden Cockerel by Ballets Russes in 1914 was an opéra-ballet, guided by Fokine with set design by Natalia Goncharova.

=== American Ballet Company ===
The outbreak of the First World War in August 1914, disrupted the established touring circuit, which included countries now on opposing sides. Many dancers, including Fokine, returned to their home countries. He moved to Sweden with his family in 1918, and later established his home in New York City, where he founded a ballet school in 1921, and continued to appear with his wife, Vera Fokina. One of his pupils was Patricia Bowman. By 1924, he organized the American Ballet Company, which performed regularly at the Metropolitan Opera House and toured the United States. His first piece for the company was the comedy Bluebeard, set to a score by Jacques Offenbach.

His ballet Les Sylphides was the first production at the American Ballet Theatre on 11 January 1940. In 1937, Fokine joined Wassily de Basil's offshoot of the Ballets Russes, which was eventually named the Original Ballet Russe. Among the new works Fokine created during this period were Cendrillon (1938) and Paganini (1939). His choreography was featured with the company until 1941.

Fokine staged more than eighty ballets in Europe and the United States. His best-known works were Chopiniana, Le Carnaval (1910), and Le Pavillon d'Armide (1907). His pieces are still performed internationally. The Mariinsky Ballet performed a retrospective of Fokine's work at London's Covent Garden in July 2011.

=== Death ===
Fokine died in New York on 22 August 1942, aged 62. In tribute to his death, seventeen ballet companies around the world performed Les Sylphides simultaneously.

== Teaching methods and style ==
Fokine aspired to move beyond traditional ballet, toward a method of utilizing ballet to communicate the natural beauty of Man. He did not believe virtuoso ballet techniques to symbolize anything, and thought they could be substituted with forms that better expressed emotions and themes. Fokine was a strong believer in the communicative power of dance and pushed for creativity that broke tradition, believing that tradition is often distinct from reality and fails to capture the entire spectrum of human emotions. He believed that unless movements are expressive, they are irrational and neither delightful nor tolerable.

Fokine also sought to strip ballets of their artificial technicality and outdated costumes. He believed that many of the ballets of his time used costumes and techniques that did not reflect the themes of the ballets. Fokine studied Greek and Egyptian art, including vase painting and sculpture, and incorporated these into his ballets. As a choreographer, he took ballerinas out of their pointe shoes when pointe did not serve any "artistic purpose". He believed that pointe should be used when the dancing body desires to express a soaring and upward theme, rather than to flaunt the strength of dancers' feet. He presented this new idea to the Imperial Mariinsky Theater's management, but did not win their support. One of Fokine's requests was to have his dancers perform barefoot in his 1907 ballet Eunice. His request was denied, and Fokine had toes painted on the dancers' tights so they would appear to be barefoot.

He also experimented with shifting the emphasis of movement away from the lower body and towards the whole body, with freer use of the arms and torso and using each muscle with clear intention. In doing so, Fokine sought to unify motion with emotion and the body with the soul, bringing new life to the ballet as a language and an art.

In 1923, he choreographed the ballet Ajanta Frescoes for Anna Pavlova after she had been inspired by her visit to the Ajanta Caves.

== Cultural depiction ==
- Nijinsky (film), film by Herbert Ross - portrayed by Jeremy Irons (1980)
- Anna Pavlova, film by Emil Loteanu - portrayed by Sergey Shakurov (1983)

Tribute To Ballet, with Prefatory poem To M. Michel Fokine, by John Masefield (1938)

== See also ==
- List of dancers
- List of Russian ballet dancers
