= Quartet =

Ensemble of four singers or instrumental performers

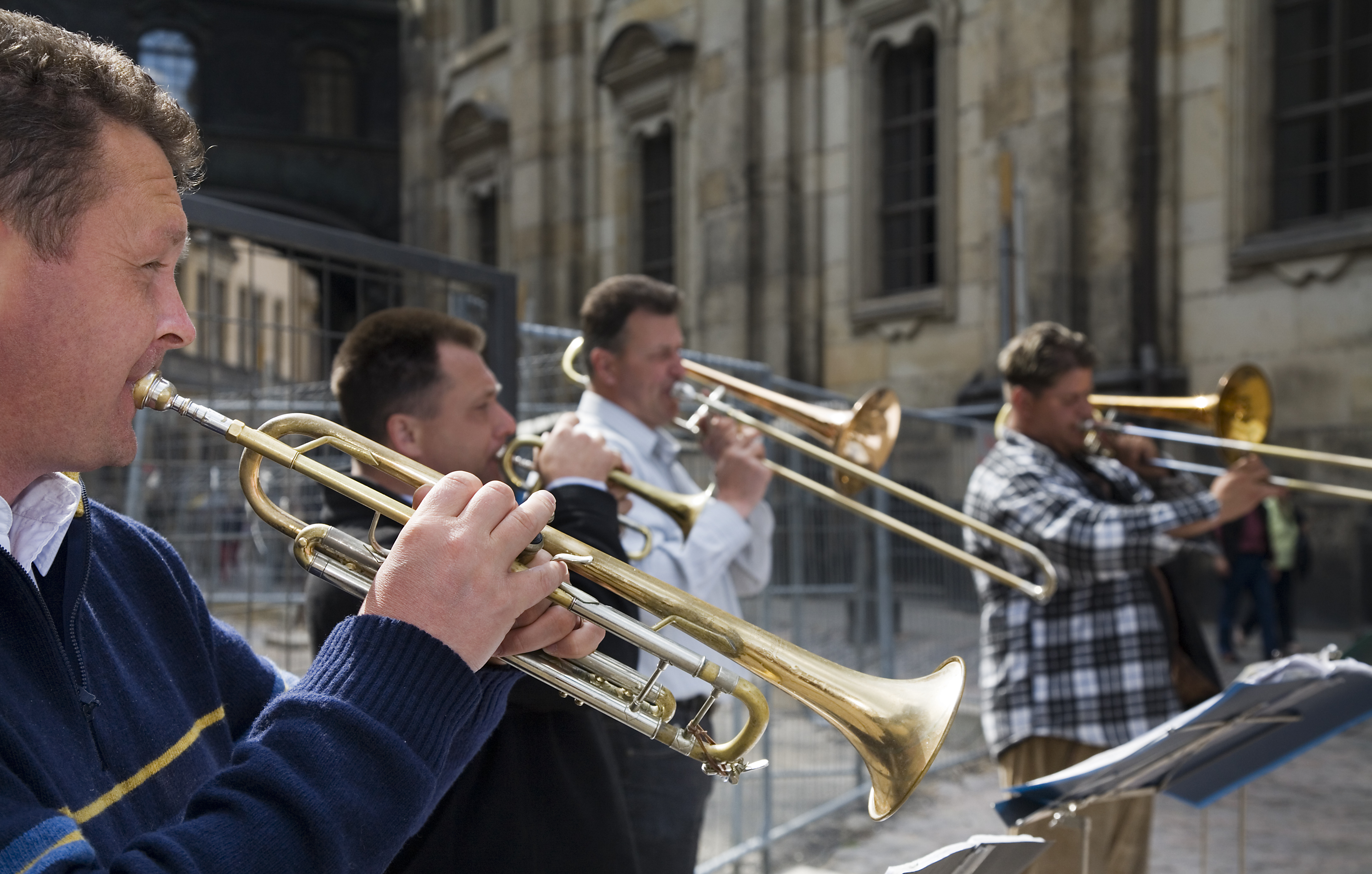
A street brass quartet

In music, a quartet (French: quatuor, German: Quartett, Italian: quartetto, Spanish: cuarteto, Polish: kwartet) is an ensemble of four singers or instrumental performers.

== Classical ==
=== String quartet ===
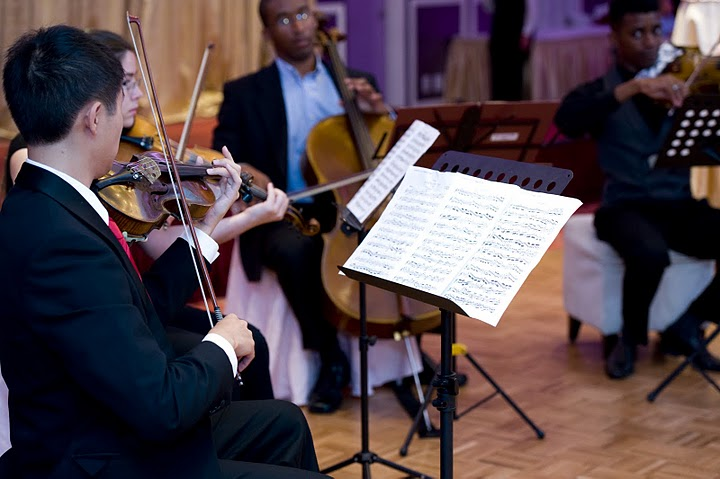
A string quartet in performance. From left to right - violin 1, violin 2, cello, viola

In classical music, one of the most common combinations of four instruments in chamber music is the string quartet. String quartets most often consist of two violins, a viola, and a cello. The particular choice and number of instruments derives from the registers of the human voice: soprano, alto, tenor and bass (SATB). In the string quartet, two violins play the soprano and alto vocal registers, the viola plays the tenor register and the cello plays the bass register.

Composers of notable string quartets include Joseph Haydn (68 compositions), Wolfgang Amadeus Mozart (23), Ludwig van Beethoven (16), Franz Schubert (15), Felix Mendelssohn (6), Johannes Brahms (3), Antonín Dvořák (14), Alexander Borodin (2), Béla Bartók (6), Elizabeth Maconchy (13), Darius Milhaud (18), Heitor Villa-Lobos (17), and Dmitri Shostakovich (15). The Italian composer Luigi Boccherini (1743–1805), wrote 91 string quartets.

Less often, string quartets are written for other combinations of the standard string ensemble. These include quartets for one violin, two violas, and one cello, notably by Carl Stamitz (6 compositions) and others; and for one violin, one viola, and two cellos, by Johann Georg Albrechtsberger and others.

=== Piano quartet ===
Another common standard classical quartet is the piano quartet, usually consisting of violin, viola, cello, and piano. Romantic composers Beethoven, Brahms, and Mendelssohn each wrote three important compositions in this form, and Mozart, Dvořák, and Gabriel Fauré each wrote two. Olivier Messiaen's Quartet for the End of Time substitutes clarinet for viola.

=== Other instrumental quartets ===
Wind quartets are scored either the same as a string quartet with the wind instrument replacing the first violin (i.e. scored for wind, violin, viola and cello) or are groups of four wind instruments. Among the latter, the SATB format woodwind quartet of flute, oboe, clarinet, and bassoon is relatively common.

An example of a wind quartet featuring four of the same types of wind instruments is the saxophone quartet, consisting of soprano saxophone, alto saxophone, tenor saxophone and baritone saxophone. Often a second alto may be substituted for the soprano part or a bass saxophone may be substituted for the baritone.

=== Vocal quartet ===
Compositions for four singers have been written for quartets a cappella; accompanied by instruments, such as a piano; and accompanied by larger vocal forces, such as a choir. Brahms and Schubert wrote numerous pieces for four voices that were once popular in private salons, although they are seldom performed today. Vocal quartets also feature within larger classical compositions, such as opera, choral works, and symphonic compositions. The final movement of Beethoven's Ninth Symphony and Giuseppe Verdi's Messa da Requiem are two examples of renowned concert works that include vocal quartets.

Typically, a vocal quartet is composed of:

- Soprano, alto (or mezzo-soprano), tenor, and bass (or baritone), for mixed ensembles; or
- 1st tenor, 2nd tenor, baritone, and bass, for male groups; or
- 1st soprano, 2nd soprano, mezzo-soprano, and contralto, for female groups; or
- Tenor, lead, baritone, and bass, for barbershop style (both male and female).

=== Baroque quartet ===
The baroque quartet is a form of music composition similar to the trio sonata, but with four music parts performed by three solo melodic instruments and basso continuo. The solo instruments could be strings or wind instruments.

Examples of baroque quartets are Georg Philipp Telemann's Paris quartets.

== Jazz ==
Quartets are popular in jazz and jazz fusion music. Jazz quartet ensembles are often composed of a horn (eg., saxophone, trumpet, clarinet, cornet, etc.), a chordal instrument (e.g., piano, electric guitar, Hammond organ, vibraphone, etc.), a bass instrument (e.g., double bass, tuba or bass guitar) and a drum set. This configuration is sometimes modified by using a second horn replacing the chordal instrument, such as a trumpet and saxophone with string bass and drum kit, or by using two chordal instruments (e.g., piano and electric guitar). A quartet involving a Hammond organ might not include a bass player, since the organist can cover bass duties.

== Popular music ==
=== Rock and pop ===
The quartet lineup is also very common in pop and rock music. A standard quartet formation in pop and rock music is an ensemble typically consisting of a vocalist, an electric guitar, a bass guitar, and a drum kit. This configuration is sometimes modified so that the vocalist also plays guitar, or sometimes a keyboard instrument (e.g., organ, piano, synthesizer) or soloing instrument (e.g., saxophone) may be used.

=== Vocal quartet ===
In the 20th century Western popular music, the term "vocal quartet" usually refers to ensembles of four singers of the same gender. This is particularly common for barbershop quartets and Gospel quartets.

Some well-known female US vocal quartets include The Carter Sisters; The Forester Sisters; The Chiffons; The Chordettes; The Lennon Sisters; Blackpink the South Korean girl group; and En Vogue. Some well-known male US vocal quartets include The Oak Ridge Boys; The Statler Brothers; The Ames Brothers; The Chi-Lites; Crosby, Stills, Nash & Young; The Dixie Hummingbirds; The Four Aces; The Four Freshmen; The Four Seasons; Four Tops; The Statesmen Quartet; The Blackwood Brothers; Cathedral Quartet; Ernie Haase & Signature Sound; Golden Gate Quartet; The Hilltoppers; The Jordanaires; and The Mills Brothers. The only known U.S. drag quartet is The Kinsey Sicks. Some mixed-gender vocal quartets include ABBA, The Pied Pipers; The Mamas & the Papas; The Merry Macs; and The Weavers.

== Folk music ==
=== Russian ===
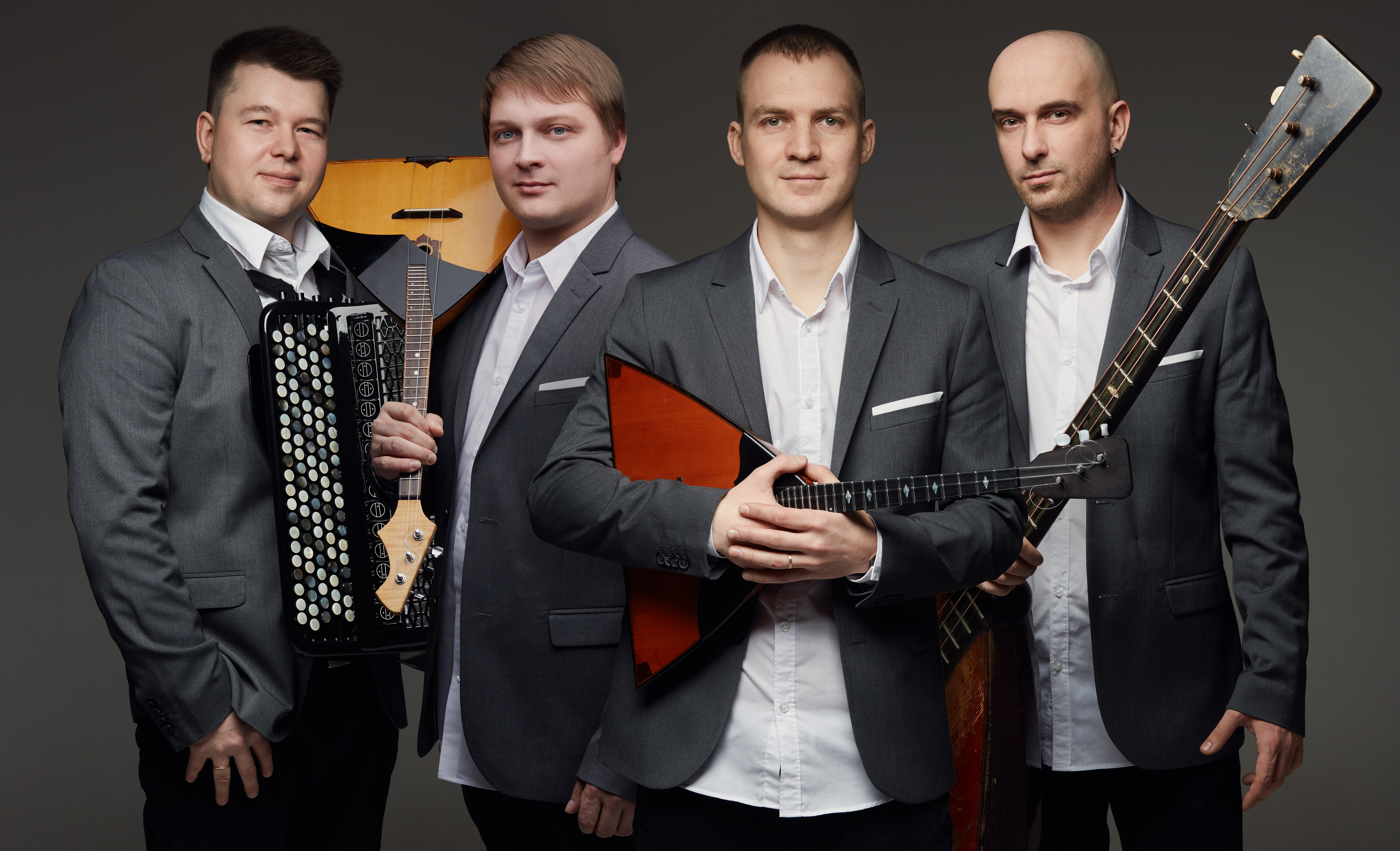
Style Quartet from Saint Petersburg: • Alexander Smertin, artistic director, bayan, • Alexander Barbolin, Prima Balalaika, • Alexey Busin, Viola Balalaika, • Evgeny Redkin, Contrabass Balalaika.

A Russian folk-instrument quartet commonly consists of a bayan, a prima balalaika, a prima or alto domra, and a contrabass balalaika (e.g., Quartet Moskovskaya Balalaika). Configurations without a bayan include a prima domra, a prima balalaika, an alto domra, and a bass balalaika (Quartet Skaz); or two prima domras, a prima balalaika, and a bass balalaika.
