= Ginislao Paris =

Italian composer and musician (1852 – after 1917)

- Ginislao Cesare Antonio Paris
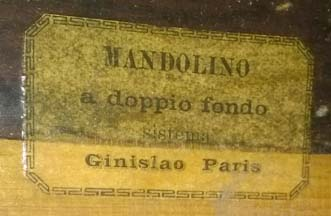
- Born: March 15, 1852; Naples, Kingdom of the Two Sicilies
- Died: unknown, after 1917
- Occupations: Trombonist, Mandolinist

Ginislao Paris (1852 – after 1917) was an Italian composer and musician in the Russian Empire who played trombone with the Russian Imperial Opera Orchestra in St. Petersburg. He also played mandolin, founding the first mandolin orchestra in Russia, The society of amateur Mandolinists and Guitarists in the 1880s. That orchestra was important because it inspired Vassily Andreev, to form the first orchestra based on Russian instruments.

Paris invented a specialized mandolin which was named for him (Sistema Ginislao Paris) and built by the workshops of Luigi Embergher. The Paris Ginislao mandolins feature a double top (a second hollow space within the instrument, created by a false back between the soundboard and the instrument's back). The double top is a feature that mandolin makers are now experimenting with in the 21st century, to get better sound. Mandolinists such as Avi Avital and Joseph Brent use them, and they are custom instruments, today.

In 1905, Roman luthier Luigi Embergher made several mandolin family instruments based on Ginislao Paris' own design, featuring double top and special bracing system. Only four instruments of “Sistema Ginislao Paris” forming the mandolin family quartet are known presently. One is an Embergher Artistico mandolin model No. 8, held in the Theatre Museum of St Petersburg. Another is a Liuto cantabile (known as the Russian Embergher) of model 5 bis, another mandolin No.5 bis and a mandola model 5 bis, held in private collections.

== Ginislao Paris' history ==
Ginislao Paris was born Ginislao Cesare Antonio Paris in Naples, 15 March 1852. In Russian he was known as Джинислао Францевич Парис (Djenislav Frantzevich).

From 1868 to 1872 Paris served as a volunteer in Italian military forces. He began his career as a trombonist in the orchestra of the Russian Imperial Opera in St. Petersburg at the Mariinsky Theatre Orchestra on 1 January 1876. He married Maria Alexandrovna Strasser in St. Petersburg in 1879. They had daughters: Violetta-Tamara (b.1882) and Margherita (b.1893). In the 1880s Ginislao Paris led the Society of Amateur Mandolinists and Guitarists of St. Petersburg (Circolo), which eventually became the first mandolin orchestra in Russia. According to Flaviy Sokolov's book, Vasily Andreyev was inspired by the Ginislao Paris orchestra to turn from his solo balalaika performances to creation of a full orchestra of Russian folk instruments.

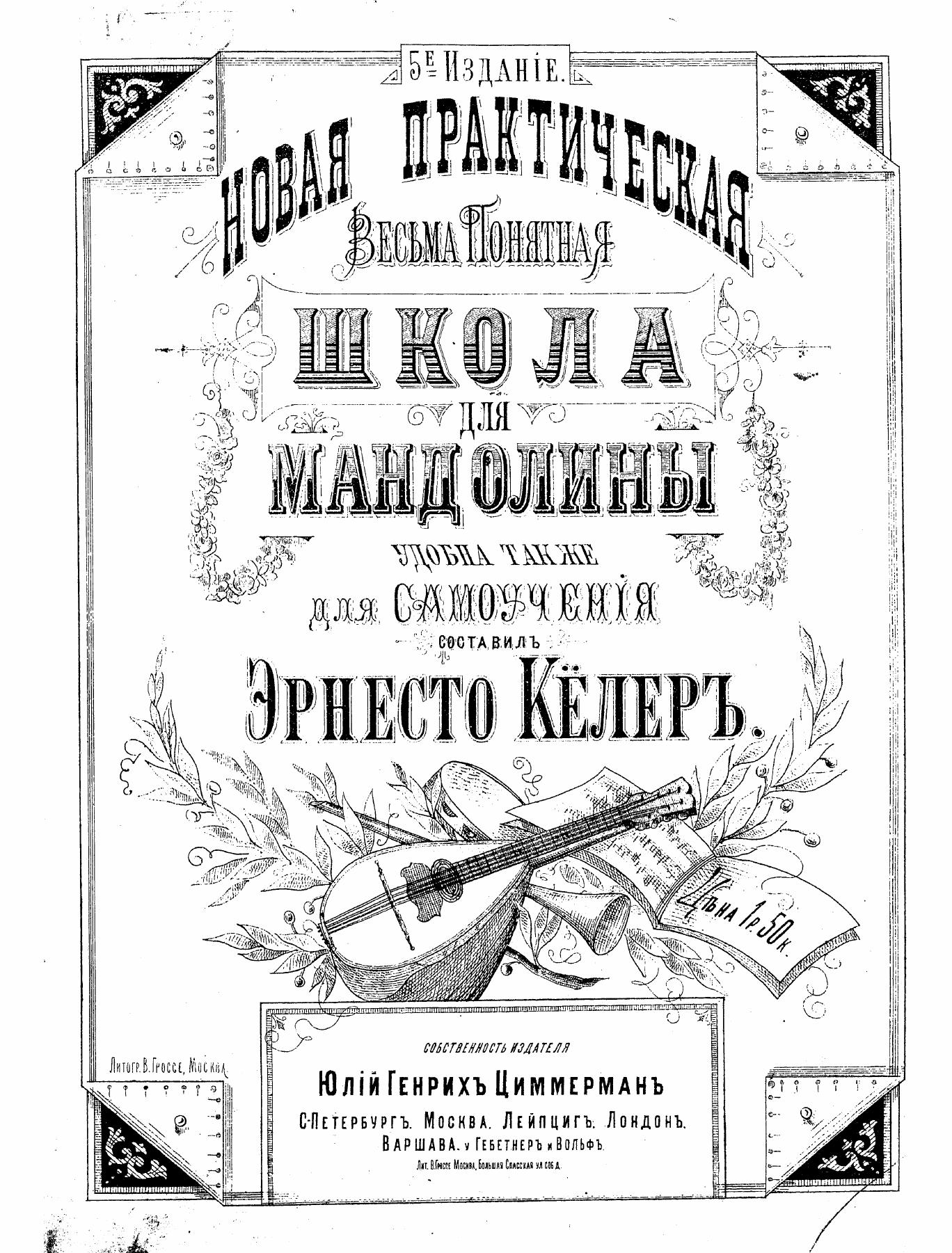
Cover of A New and Practical School for Mandolin (Новая практическая весьма понятная школа для мандолины) by Ernesto Köhler, with dual German-Russian entries. Version market to Germans was published c. 1887.

Carlo Graziani-Walter, noted Italian mandolinist and composer of his time dedicated his rendition of Rimembranze from Gounod’s Faust for mandolin to Ginislao Paris. The dedication says "All’ Egregio Signor Ginislao Paris, Professore nei Teatri Imperiali, Maestro Direttore del Circolo Mandolinisti di Benificenza a Pietroburgo" (To Mr. Ginislao Paris, Professor at the Imperial Theaters, Master Director of the Benedictine Mandolinist Circle in Petersburg). Along with violin maker Pietro Bozzolo (1840–1907), Paris was a member of the Revisionary Commission of the Italian Charitable Society of St. Petersburg. Proceeds from the concerts were given to that charity. Russian (and later American) ballet dancer Michel Fokine, Anna Pavlova's friend and colleague, in his memoirs recalls playing mandolin in Ginislao Paris' ensemble and later joining Andreyev's Russian orchestra on domra before giving up playing on stage in favour of his ballet career.

Ginislao Paris played in the same orchestra with another Italian, flautist Ernesto Köhler, who also played mandolin and wrote the first mandolin method book in Russia, (First edition published by J.H. Zimmermannin 1887). He was probably also involved in Ginislao Paris circolo. According to the Imperial Theatres director Telyakovski's diaries, together with Riccardo Drigo, Ginislao Paris wrote music to "Son Uslady" (The Dream of Uslada) performed in January 1903.

Ginislao Paris became a Russian citizen in 1899. He retired from the Orchestra in 1900 for health reasons and was granted special merits pension by imperial decree. All Petersburg reference book continued to list Ginislao Paris details until 1917. His further whereabouts and death details are unknown. In 2023 a small garden in Montecalvario, Naples has been named after Ginislao Paris.
