= Ildar Abdrazakov =

Russian opera singer (born 1976)

Ildàr Abdrazàkov
- Ильдар Абдразаков
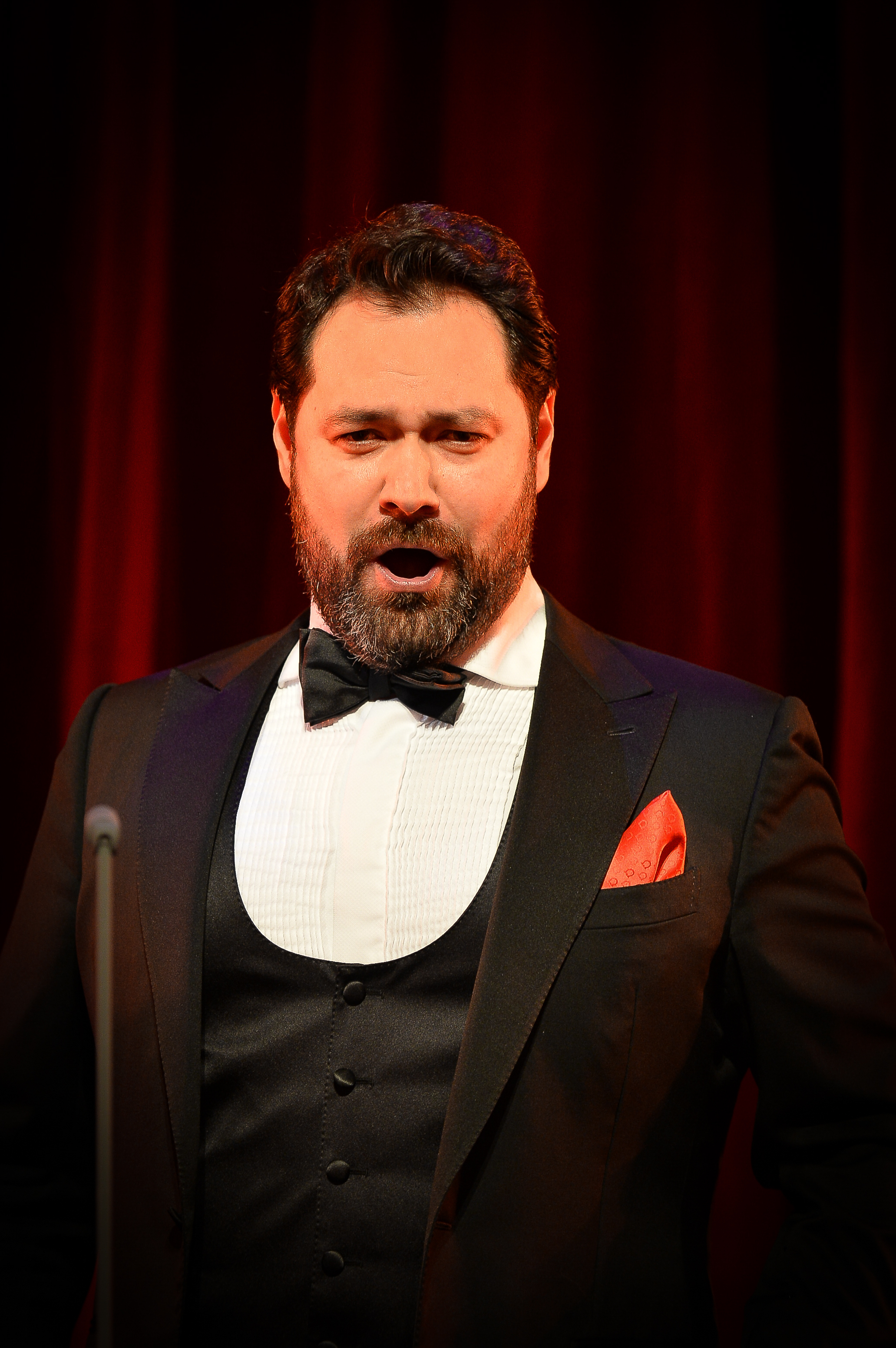
- Ildar Abdrazakov Gala Russe Monaco, 2018
- Born: 26 September 1976 (age 50); Ufa, Russian SFSR, Soviet Union
- Education: Ufa State Institute of Arts
- Occupation: Operatic bass
- Years active: 1996–present
- Spouse: Marika Gvilava (m. 2016)
- Website: ildarabdrazakov.com

Ildàr Amìrovich Abdrazàkov (Russian: Ильда́р Ами́рович Абдраза́ков; Bashkir: Абдразаҡов Илдар Әмир улы, Abdrazaqov İldar Ämir ulı; born 26 September 1976) is a Russian operatic bass. Honoured Artist of Russia (2021).

== Early life and career ==
Abdrazakov was born in Ufa, the capital of the Republic of Bashkortostan, Russia. His elder brother, Askar Abdrazakov, is also a professional operatic bass; they have performed together, most notably at the Washington National Opera. His parents were both artists: his mother a painter, and his father (deceased) a director. Joined the Bashkirian Opera and Ballet Theatre after graduating from the Ufa State Institute of Arts. He won a number of vocal competitions in the late 1990s including the Moscow Grand Prix, the Glinka International Vocal Competition, the Rimsky-Korsakov International Competition and the Elena Obraztsova International Competition of Young Opera Singers. Abdrazakov's 2000 win at the Maria Callas International Television Competition in Parma led to his recital debut at La Scala in 2001.

== Opera and concert work ==
Abdrazakov made his Metropolitan Opera debut in 2004 in Don Giovanni under James Levine and has since appeared there regularly. In 2008–09 he headlined a new production of Verdi's Attila, and in 2011 he made his role debut as Henry VIII in a new, season-opening production of Donizetti's Anna Bolena with Anna Netrebko. In the 2004–05 season, Abdrazakov joined Riccardo Muti in concert for the reopening of the Teatro alla Scala and sang the role of Moses in a production of Rossini's Moïse et Pharaon. The production was recorded and released on CD and DVD. In 2009, Abdrazakov made his Salzburg Festival debut in the same role; the new production was also led by Muti. Abdrazakov first appeared at London's Royal Opera House in 2009, performing Verdi's Requiem in concert with Antonio Pappano, and he has since returned there to sing Don Basilio in Rossini's Il barbiere di Siviglia. In the 2012–13 season, Abdrazakov performs the title roles in Don Giovanni at Washington National Opera and the Metropolitan Opera, as well as that of Le nozze di Figaro at the Met.

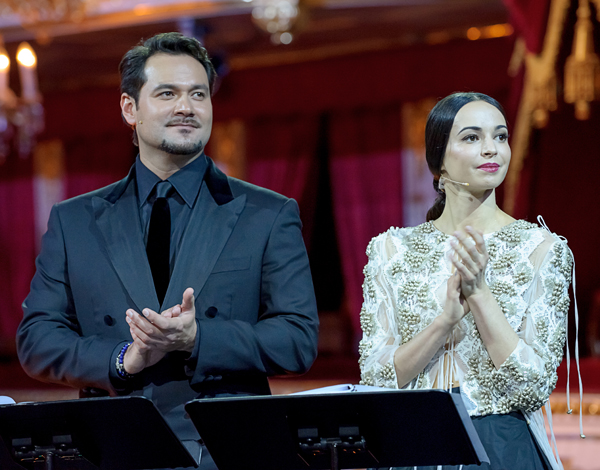
Ildar Abdrazakov and Diana Vishneva

At the Mariinsky Theater, Abdrazakov has performed the title character and Leporello in Mozart's Don Giovanni; Méphistophélès in Gounod's Faust and Berlioz's The Damnation of Faust; Oroveso in Bellini's Norma; Selim in Rossini's Il turco in Italia; and Assur in Semiramide. In addition to Attila, Abdrazakov's other Verdi roles include Banquo in Macbeth, Walter in Luisa Miller, and the title character in Oberto. Abdrazakov has also performed at Barcelona's Liceu, Madrid's Teatro Real, the Opéra Bastille in Paris, the San Francisco Opera, the Washington National Opera, and the Los Angeles Opera. On the concert stage, he has given recitals in Russia, Italy, Japan, and the United States, and performed with orchestras including the Chicago Symphony, the Vienna Philharmonic, the Leipzig Gewandhaus Orchestra, the Bayerischer Rundfunk, the Rotterdam Philharmonic, the Orchestre National de France, the Orchestra Filarmonica della Scala, and Rome's Accademia Nazionale di Santa Cecilia. He has collaborated with conductors such as Riccardo Muti, Valery Gergiev, James Levine, Gianandrea Noseda, Bertrand de Billy, Riccardo Frizza, Riccardo Chailly, and Antonio Pappano. In 2017 he returned to the Rossini Opera Festival in Pesaro to perform at a concert with conductor Ivan Lopez-Reynoso. Has interpreted the title character in Verdi's Attila at the opening of the season 2018/2019 of the Teatro alla Scala, under the direction of Riccardo Chailly and with David Livermore as stage director.

== Other activities ==
Since 2015 Ildar Abdrazakov has directed the Elena Obraztsova International Academy of Music in St Petersburg.

In 2016 he established the Ildar Abdrazakov Foundation of young artists support to promote young talented musicians. Since 2018 he is annually organizing festivals in Russia, inviting renowned singers to give concerts and masterclasses there.

In 2023, Abdrazakov appeared on a list of 700 sports, political and cultural figures who nominated Russian president Vladimir Putin as an independent candidate for reelection.

Since March 2026, Abdrazakov has been the artistic director of the Mikhailovsky Theater.

== Appearances on film and television ==
Ildar Abdrazakov has appeared as Feodor Chaliapin in several films and television series. In 2014 he performed in the comedy film Yolki 1914 and in 2022 in "Karamora", a TV series directed by Danila Kozlovsky, an action-packed large-scale thriller that presents an alternative history of the pre-revolutionary Russian Empire.

In 2020, together with Svetlana Zakharova, he was a host on the third season of the Russian ballet competition television show "Bolshoi Ballet" which aired on Russia-K.

In 2022, Ildar won third season of The Masked Singer Russia, as a "Drakon" (Dragon).

In 2026, he was featured as a coach on fourteenth season The Voice Russia. Abdrazakov was the winning coach when his final artist, Elmira Karakhanova, won the season.

== Repertoire ==
- Hector Berlioz: La Damnation de Faust (Méphistophélès)
- Georges Bizet: Carmen (Escamillo)
- Arrigo Boito: Mefistofele (Mefistofele)
- Alexander Borodin: Prince Igor (Prince Igor)
- Luigi Canepa: Riccardo III (Riccardo III)
- Gaetano Donizetti: Lucia di Lammermoor (Raimondo), Anna Bolena (Enrico)
- Charles Gounod: Faust (Méphistophélès)
- Wolfgang Amadeus Mozart: Don Giovanni (Don Giovanni, Leporello) Le Nozze di Figaro (Figaro)
- Modest Mussorgsky: Khovanshchina (Dosifei)
- Jacques Offenbach: Les contes d'Hoffmann (Lindorf, Coppélius, Dappertutto, Dr. Miracle)
- Giacomo Puccini: La bohème (Colline), Turandot (Timur)
- Gioachino Rossini: Il barbiere di Siviglia (Don Bartolo), Moïse et Pharaon (Moïse), L'Italiana in Algeri (Mustafà), La Cenerentola (Alidoro) Semiramide (Assur)
- Giuseppe Verdi: Nabucco (Zaccaria), Attila (Attila), Rigoletto (Sparafucile), La forza del destino (Padre Guardiano), Aida (Ramfis), Oberto, conte di San Bonifacio (Oberto) Macbeth (Banquo), Don Carlos (Philippe II), I vespri siciliani (Giovanni da Procida)

== Recording career ==
Abdrazakov has recorded works under several record labels. For Decca, he has recorded Rossini with the Symphony Orchestra of Milan, and Verdi's Requiem with the Chicago Symphony Orchestra; for EMI Classics, he recorded Cherubini's Mass with the Bayerischer Rundfunk; and for Chandos, he has recorded Shostakovich's Suite on Verses of Michelangelo Buonarroti and Rachmaninoff's The Miserly Knight, both with the BBC Philharmonic. His DVD releases include Moïse et Pharaon from La Scala, Oberto from Bilbao, Norma from Parma, Mefistofele from San Francisco, and Lucia di Lammermoor from the Metropolitan Opera.

The recording of Verdi's Requiem featuring Abdrazakov, by the Chicago Symphony Orchestra under Riccardo Muti, received two Grammy Awards in 2010.

In the spring of 2017 the singer concluded an exclusive recording contract with Deutsche Grammophon. In 2019 the singer released his first solo album Verdi featuring arias from Verdian operas which was recorded together with the Orchestre Métropolitain de Montréal under Yannick Nézet-Séguin and which also featured Rolando Villazón.
