= Javier Camarena =

Mexican operatic tenor

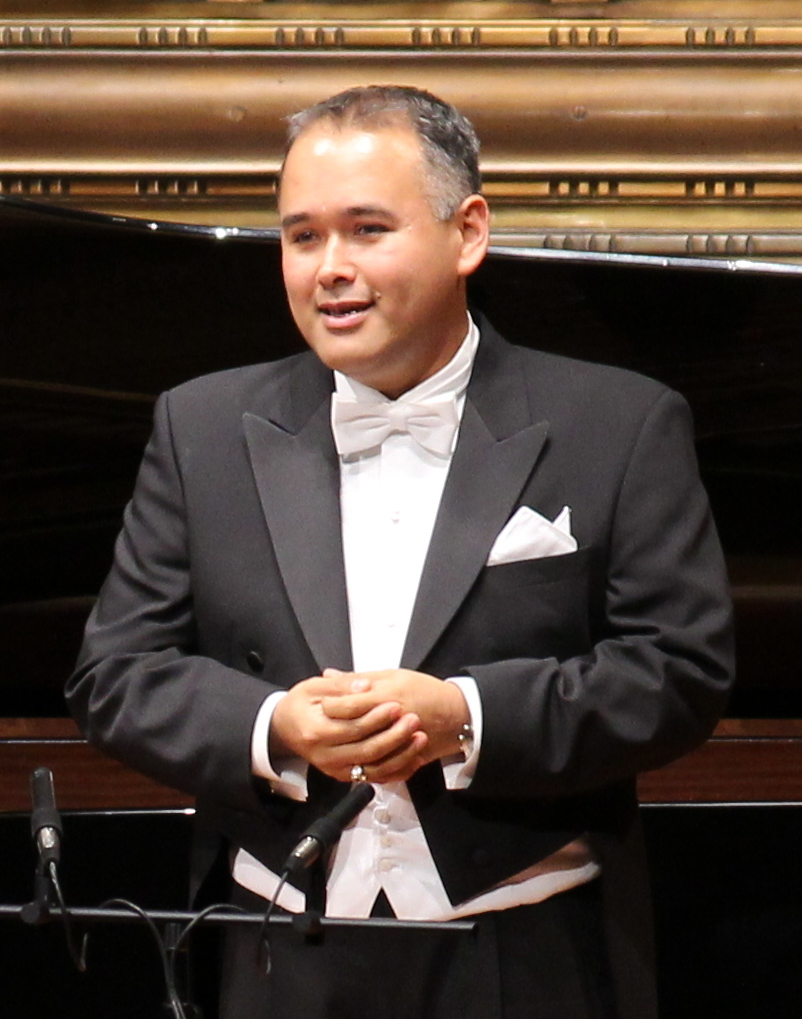
Camarena in 2011

Javier Camarena (born March 26, 1976) is a Mexican operatic tenor.

== Early life ==
Camarena was born in Xalapa, Veracruz. His father was a nuclear plant technician.

== Career ==
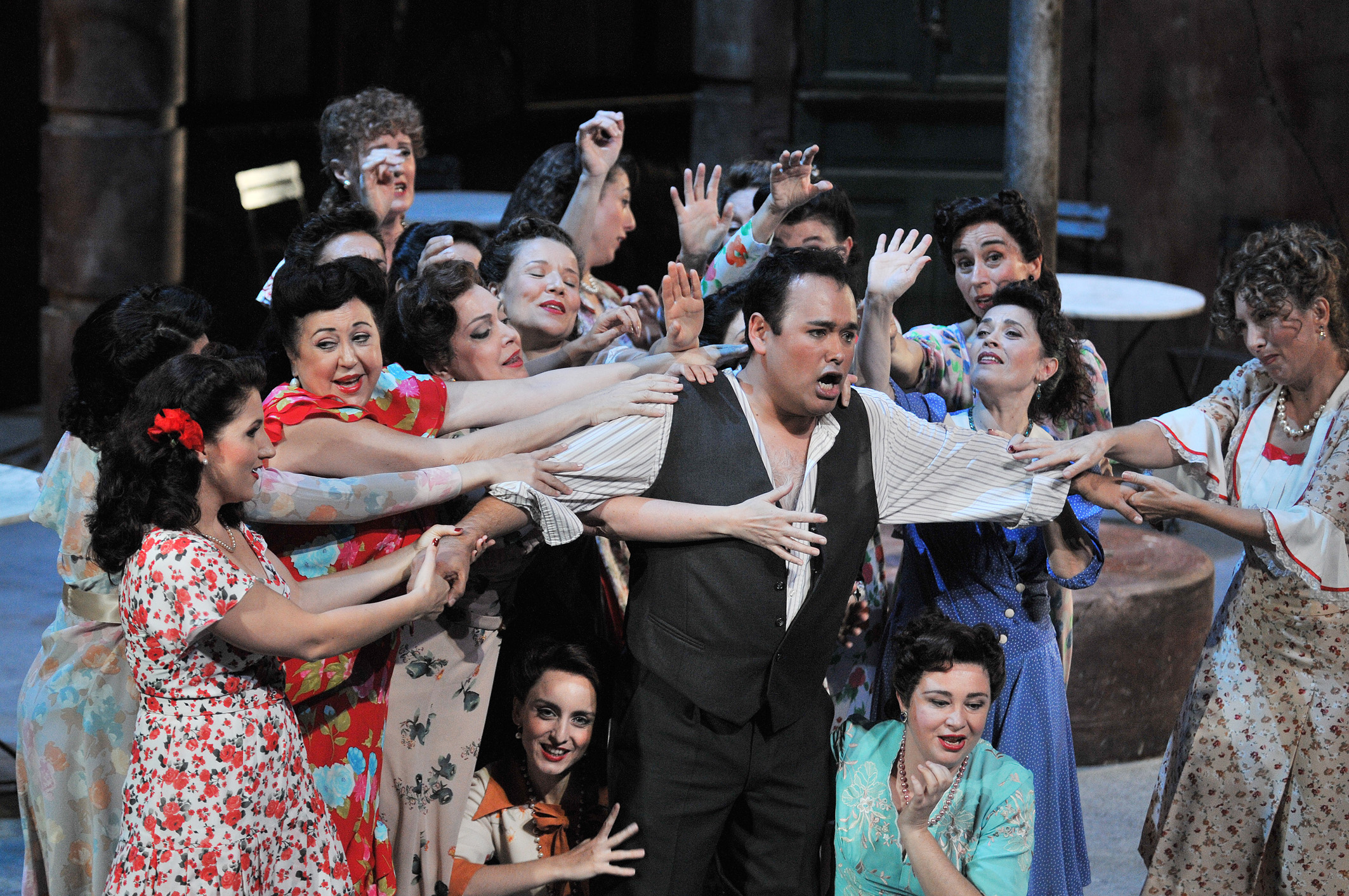
Camarena performing in Donizetti's L'elisir d'amore in 2012

Camarena specializes in roles from the bel canto era of Rossini, Bellini and Donizetti operas such as Edgardo in Lucia di Lammermoor, Arturo in I puritani and Conte Almaviva in Il barbiere di Siviglia. He has also sung leading tenor roles in Mozart and Verdi operas.

Camarena has performed at many of the world's leading opera houses and festivals including the Zurich Opera, where he was a company member for a number of years, the Royal Opera London, the Salzburg Festival, Deutsche Oper Berlin, Palacio de Bellas Artes Mexico City, Paris Opéra, the Bayerische Staatsoper Munich, the Liceu Barcelona and the Staatsoper Wien.

His performance in the role of Edgardo in Lucia di Lammermoor at the Teatro Real Madrid in 2018 won praise for his "voice of gobsmacking beauty, thrillingly secure high notes and delicious timbre", where he also offered a concert with the Orquesta Sinfónica de Madrid and conductor Ivan Lopez-Reynoso in January 2021.

=== Metropolitan Opera ===
He made his debut at the Metropolitan Opera in October 2011 in Il barbiere di Siviglia, singing the role of Count Almaviva. On April 25, 2014, Camarena became only the third singer in seventy years at the Metropolitan Opera to perform an encore onstage, and on March 12, 2016, became the second singer to perform multiple encores.

Camarena is a recipient of the Opera News awards for 2020.

== Select discography ==
- La colombe, Gounod. Opera Rara CD Cat: ORC53
- Contrabandista, recital album, Decca CD Cat: 4834099
