= Iván López Reynoso =

Mexican classical musician

Iván López Reynoso (Note: In this Mexican name, the surname is López and the second or maternal family name is Reynoso. In some contexts, the surnames are hyphenated.) (born 19 April 1990) is a Mexican opera and symphonic conductor, pianist, violinist and countertenor.

== Early life ==
López Reynoso was born in 1990 in Guanajuato, Mexico, to mechanical engineer Gustavo López and computer engineer Guadalupe Reynoso. He studied violin, piano, choir conducting and he graduated summa cum laude in orchestra conducting.

== Career ==
López Reynoso is the musical director of the Orchestra of Teatro Bellas Artes hosted at Palacio de Bellas Artes in Mexico City. He started as assistant conductor at Opera de Bellas Artes, located at Palacio de Bellas Artes at the age of 20. He would later make his opera debut as opera conductor with The Marriage of Figaro.

A special relationship connects López Reynoso to the Rossini Opera Festival (ROF) in Pesaro where he made his opera debut in 2014 with the opera Il viaggio a Reims, invited by Alberto Zedda. It then followed an invitation to conduct the concert with Ildar Abdrazakov. López Reynoso also conducted Damiano Michieletto's production of Rossini's opera La scala di seta on tour at the Royal Opera House Muscat.

He currently is Principal Guest Conductor of the Oviedo Filarmonia and was Associate Conductor of Orquesta Filarmónica de la UNAM (OFUNAM) in 2019 and 2020 in Mexico City. During the seasons 2017-18 and 2018-19 López Reynoso held the position of Erster Kapellmeister at the Staatstheater Braunschweig where he collaborated with opera directors Jürgen Flimm, Andrea Moses and Brigitte Fassbaender among others.

== Opera repertoire ==
- Vincenzo Bellini: I puritani
- Georges Bizet: Les pecheurs de perles
- Gaetano Donizetti: La fille du régiment
- Gaetano Donizetti: L'elisir d'amore
- Gaetano Donizetti: Viva la mamma
- Wolfgang Amadeus Mozart: Die Zauberflöte ("The Magic Flute")
- Giacomo Puccini: Tosca
- Giacomo Puccini: La Bohéme
- Giacomo Puccini: Madame Butterfly
- Gioachino Rossini: Il barbiere di Siviglia
- Gioachino Rossini: Il turco in Italia
- Gioachino Rossini: La scala di seta
- Gioachino Rossini: Il viaggio a Reims
- Gioachino Rossini: La Cenerentola
- Gioachino Rossini: Le comte Ory
- Giuseppe Verdi: Aida
- Dmitri Shostakovich: Moscow, Cheryomushki
- Franz Lehár: Die lustige Witwe
- Xavier Montsalvatge: El gato con botas

== Chronology ==
Year	Work	Place
2014	Il viaggio a Reims	Teatro Rossini: Rossini Opera Festival: Pesaro, Italy
2014	Die Zauberflöte	Opera de Bellas Artes: Mexico City
2014	Atzimba	Opera de Bellas Artes: Mexico City
2015	Viva la mamma: Le convenienze ed inconvenienze teatrali	Opera de Bellas Artes: Mexico City
2015	L'elisir d'amore	Centro Cultural Universitario de la Universidad Nacional: Mexico City
2016	Il viaggio a Reims	Opera de Bellas Artes: Mexico City
2017	Hansel and Gretel	Staatstheater Braunschweig: Germany
2017	Tosca	Staatstheater Braunschweig: Germany
2017	Werther	Staatstheater Braunschweig: Germany
2017	Don Carlo	Staatstheater Braunschweig: Germany
2017	Concert Ildar Abdrazakov	Teatro Rossini: Rossini Opera Festival: Pesaro, Italy
2017	Rigoletto	Staatstheater Braunschweig: Germany
2018	Die lustige Witwe	Staatstheater Braunschweig: Germany
2018	La Boheme	Staatstheater Braunschweig: Germany
2018	Der fliegende Holländer	Staatstheater Braunschweig: Germany
2018	Il turco in Italia	Teatro Campoamor: Oviedo, Spain
2018	Carmen	Staatstheater Braunschweig: Germany
2018	Cheryomushki	Staatstheater Braunschweig: Germany
2018	La clemenza di Tito	Staatstheater Braunschweig: Germany
2018	La porta della legge	Staatstheater Braunschweig: Germany
2018	Die sieben Todsünden	Staatstheater Braunschweig: Germany
2019	Il barbiere di Siviglia	Gran Teatro Nacional de Lima: Peru
2019	La scala di seta	Royal Opera House Muscat: Oman
2019	The turn of the screw	Staatstheater Braunschweig: Germany
2020	Così fan tutte	Teatro de la Maestranza: Seville, Spain
2020	I puritani	Teatro Campoamor: Oviedo, Spain
2020	La fille du régiment	Opera de Bellas Artes: Mexico City
2021	Concert with Javier Camarena	Teatro Real: Madrid
2021	La vida breve	Teatro Campoamor: Oviedo, Spain
2021	La Tempranica	Teatro Campoamor: Oviedo, Spain
