= Reynoso =

Reynoso may refer to:

- 21605 Reynoso, a minor planet
- Juan Reynoso (disambiguation)
- Alonso de Reinoso (1518–1567), Spanish Conquistador
- Emanuel Alberto Reynoso (born 1983), Argentine footballer
- Emanuel Reynoso (footballer, born 1995), Argentine footballer
- Yolanda Reynoso (born 1946), Mexican volleyball player
