= Ufa State Institute of Arts =

Art school in Ufa, Russia

Zagir Ismagilov Ufa State Institute of Arts
- Zağir İsmeğilev isemendeğe Öfö Deület Senğet İnstitutı
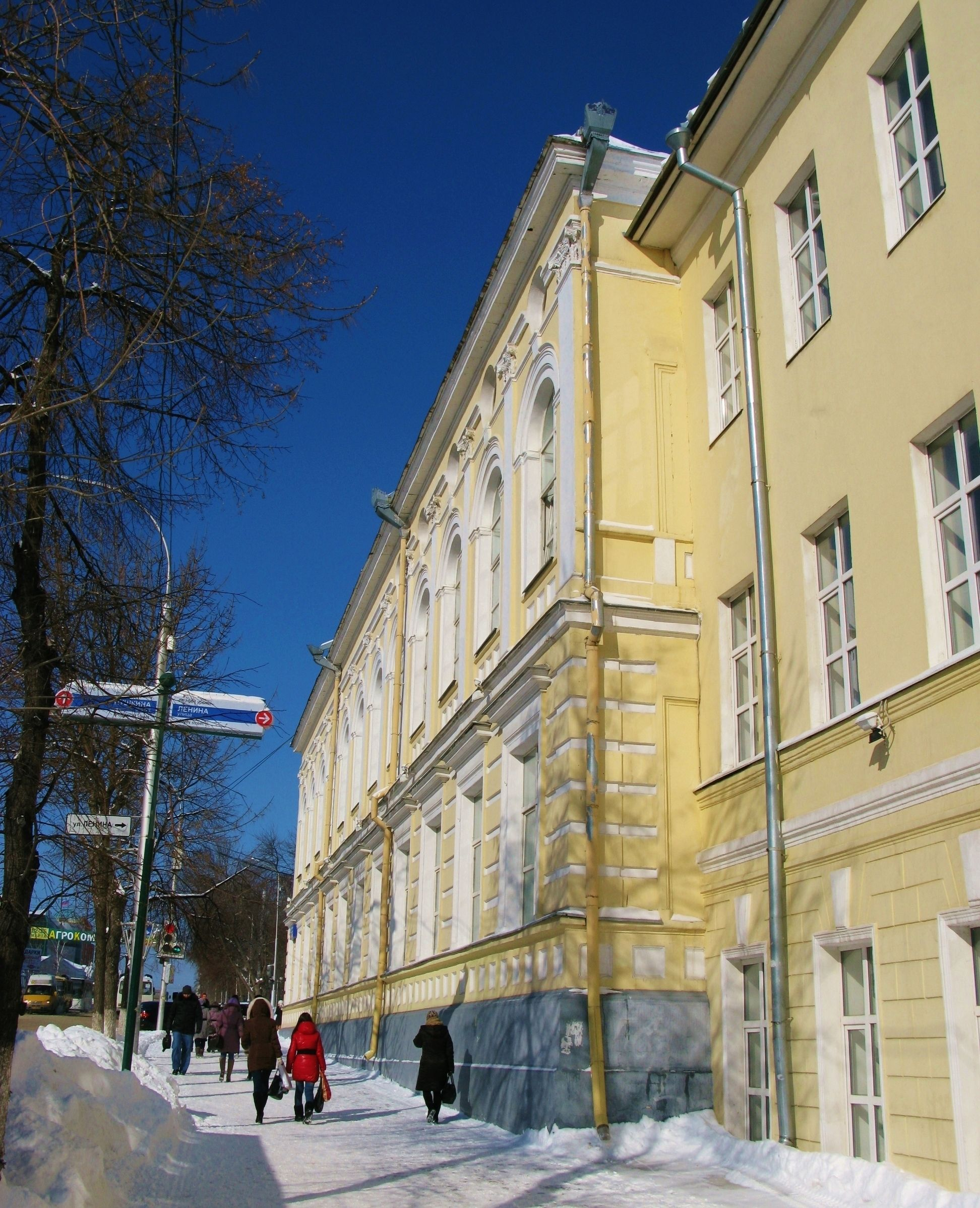
- Main building of Ufa State Institute of Arts
- Former names: branch of the Gnesins State Musical-Pedagogical Institute; (1950–1968); Ufa Institute of Arts; (1968-2003); Ufa State Academy of Arts; (2003-2015); Zagir Ismagilov Ufa State Institute of Arts; (since 2015)
- Type: Public
- Location: Ufa, Bashkortostan, Russia
- Campus: Urban
- Website: en.ufaart.ru

Zagir Ismagilov Ufa State Institute of Arts (Bashkir: Zağir İsmeğilev isemendeğe Öfö Deület Senğet İnstitutı) is one of the leading academic institutions of higher education of Russia. At the same time it is a unique educational institution of Bashkortostan, graduating professionals in the field of music, theatre and art.

Ufa State Institute of Arts comprises four faculties and 21 departments, where teachers train students for 33 specialties. Training students is carried out by full-time and part-time programs on both free and commercial basis.

== History ==
The institute was opened in 1968 as a branch of the Gnesins State Musical-Pedagogical Institute (now is the Gnessin State Musical College). Today it has the status of a state institution of the Ministry of Culture of the Russian Federation.

== Notable alumni ==
- Askar Abdrazakov, opera singer
- Ildar Abdrazakov, opera singer
- Aigul Akhmetshina, soloist of the Royal Opera House Covent Garden (London)
- Alfiya Karimova, the leading soloist of the Astana Opera (Kazakhstan)

== Gallery ==
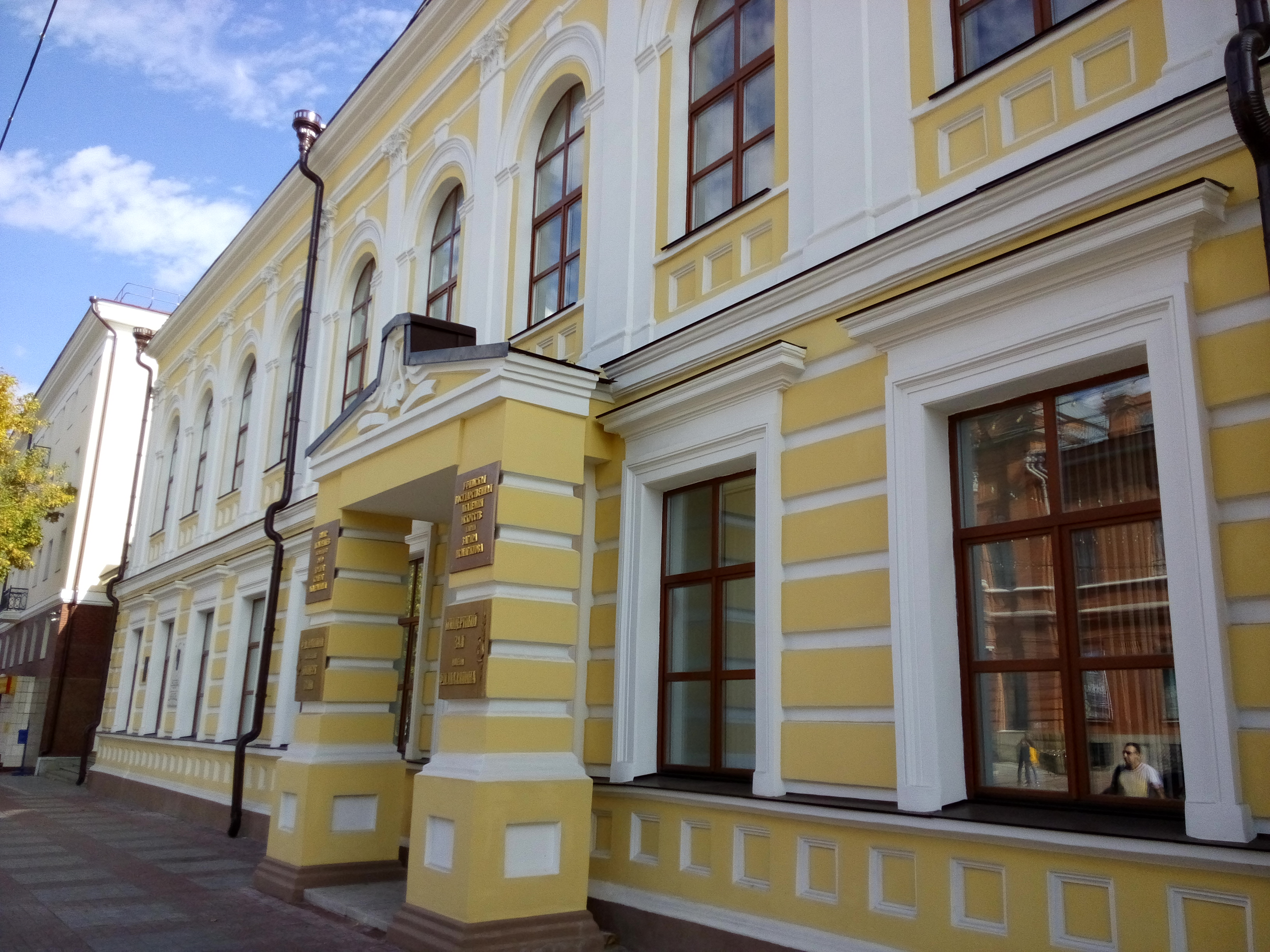
Former Ufa Gentry Assembly Building (built in 1844–1856). Now is Institute's rectory.

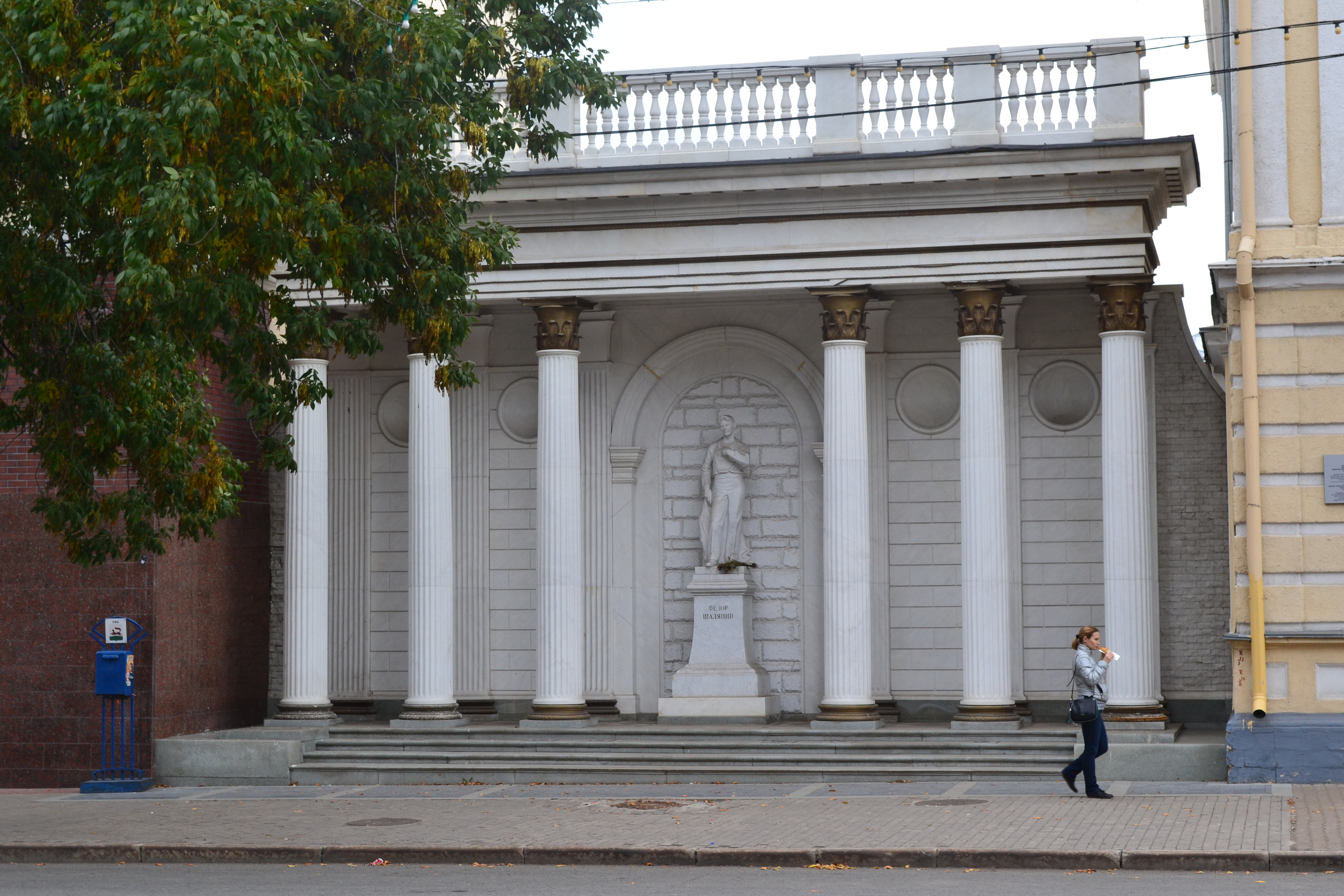
Rotonda in front of the institute. "Feodor Chaliapin performed here"
