= Tamara Volskaya =

Russian musician

Tamara Volskaya is a Ukrainian born Russian performing musician whose principal instrument is the domra. She was born in Kyiv and graduated the Conservatory of Music there, is a Merited Artist of Russia, a Laureate of USSR music competitions, and a professor at the Mussorgsky Ural State Conservatory of Yekaterinburg, Russia.

She also performs on the mandolin. She is a recognized authority in the mandolin world, a regular guest artist and instructor of the Classical Mandolin Society of America and BDAA (Balalaika and Domra Association of America and Canada). She regularly appears as a domra and mandolin soloist with orchestras across the US, the former USSR, and Canada, and has performed in Europe, Australia, Israel, and Japan.

Tamara teaches as well as performs. She organized and headed the Folk Instrument Faculty at the Conservatory’s School for Gifted Students in Yekaterinburg, Russia. She has taught classes on the domra and mandolin worldwide and is the author of several scholarly works on the domra.

In America, Tamara worked to popularize Russian Folk instruments in the cultural world of New York City. Together with her husband, Anatoliy Trofimov, a bayan player and arranger, they form the "Russian Duo." They also organized “Russian Carnival,” a Russian folk instruments ensemble in New York City.

Tamara’s repertoire, both on domra and mandolin, spans a wide range of musical periods and styles, from classical to modern, as well as folk music based on Russian, Gypsy, Jewish, and Eastern European themes. It includes violin classics such as “Introduction and Rondo Capriccioso” (Saint-Saëns), “Zigeunerweisen” (Sarasate), as well as Vivaldi’s Concertos, “Russian Dance” from Swan Lake (Tchaikovsky), “Rhapsody in Blue” (Gershwin) and selections by Scarlatti, Beethoven, Chopin, Kreisler, Shostakovich.
