= Atzimba =

1900 opera by Ricardo Castro

- Opera by Ricardo Castro Herrera
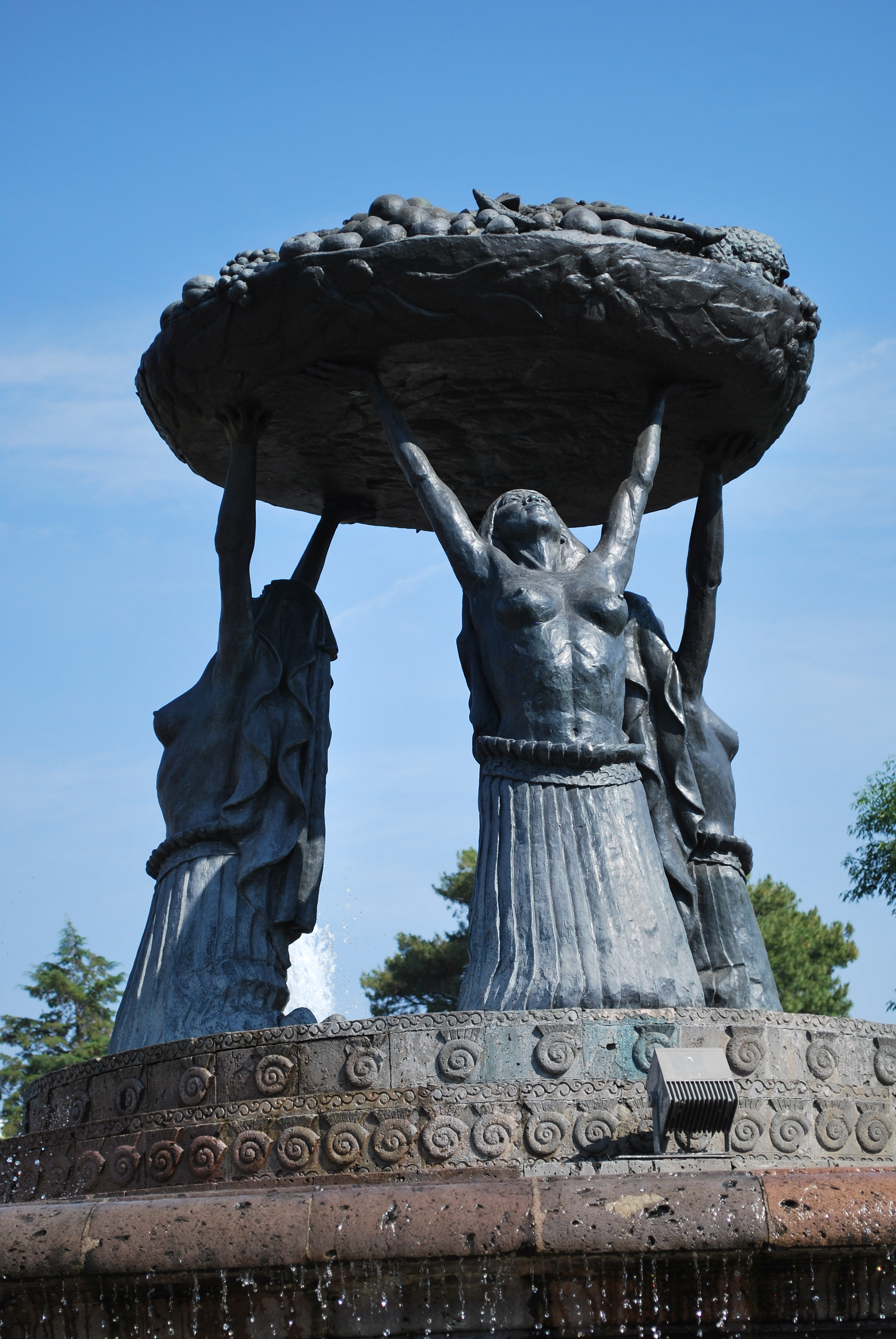
- Fuente de las Tarascas in Morelia, Michoacán. The figures are believed to depict Atzimba and two other Tarascan princesses.
- Librettist: Alberto Michel & Alejandro Cuevas
- Based on: Spanish conquest of the Tarascan Empire
- Premiere: 10 November 1900; Teatro Renacimiento, Mexico City

Atzimba is an opera in three acts by Mexican composer Ricardo Castro Herrera (1864–1907) with a libretto by Alberto Michel and Alejandro Cuevas. Set in the Tarascan Empire (Note: Alternatively known as the Purépecha Empire.) at the time of the Spanish conquest of Mexico, it tells the story of the ill-fated love between Atzimba, a Tarascan princess, and Jorge de Villadiego, a Spanish conquistador. The poet Amado Nervo described it as "a kind of Tarascan Aida".

== Roles and synopsis ==
| Role | Voice type |
|---|---|
| Atzimba, Tarascan princess | Soprano |
| Jorge de Villadiego, Spanish captain | Tenor |
| Sirunda, friend to Atzimba | Mezzo-soprano |
| Huépac, high priest | Bass |
| Hirepan, Tarascan general | Baritone |
| Tzimzitcha, Tarascan king | Bass |
Source: Operalounge

Based on a Purépecha legend collected by Eduardo Ruiz Álvarez, the opera narrates the tragic love between the princess Atzimba and the Spanish captain Jorge de Villadiego. When de Villadiego is captured and his sacrifice ordered, Atzimba takes the high priest's knife and ends her own life.

== Production history ==
With a score by Ricardo Castro and a libretto by Alberto Michel and Alejandro Cuevas, Atzimba premiered as a zarzuela at Mexico City's Teatro Arbeu on 21 January 1900. (Note: The 18th-century building that housed the Teatro Arbeu was expropriated by the federal government in 1959. It currently houses the Miguel Lerdo de Tejada Library.) The composer subsequently reworked it as a formal opera, which made its début on 10 November 1900 at the Teatro Renacimiento. The Palacio de Bellas Artes – at the time still under construction – housed a production in 1928.

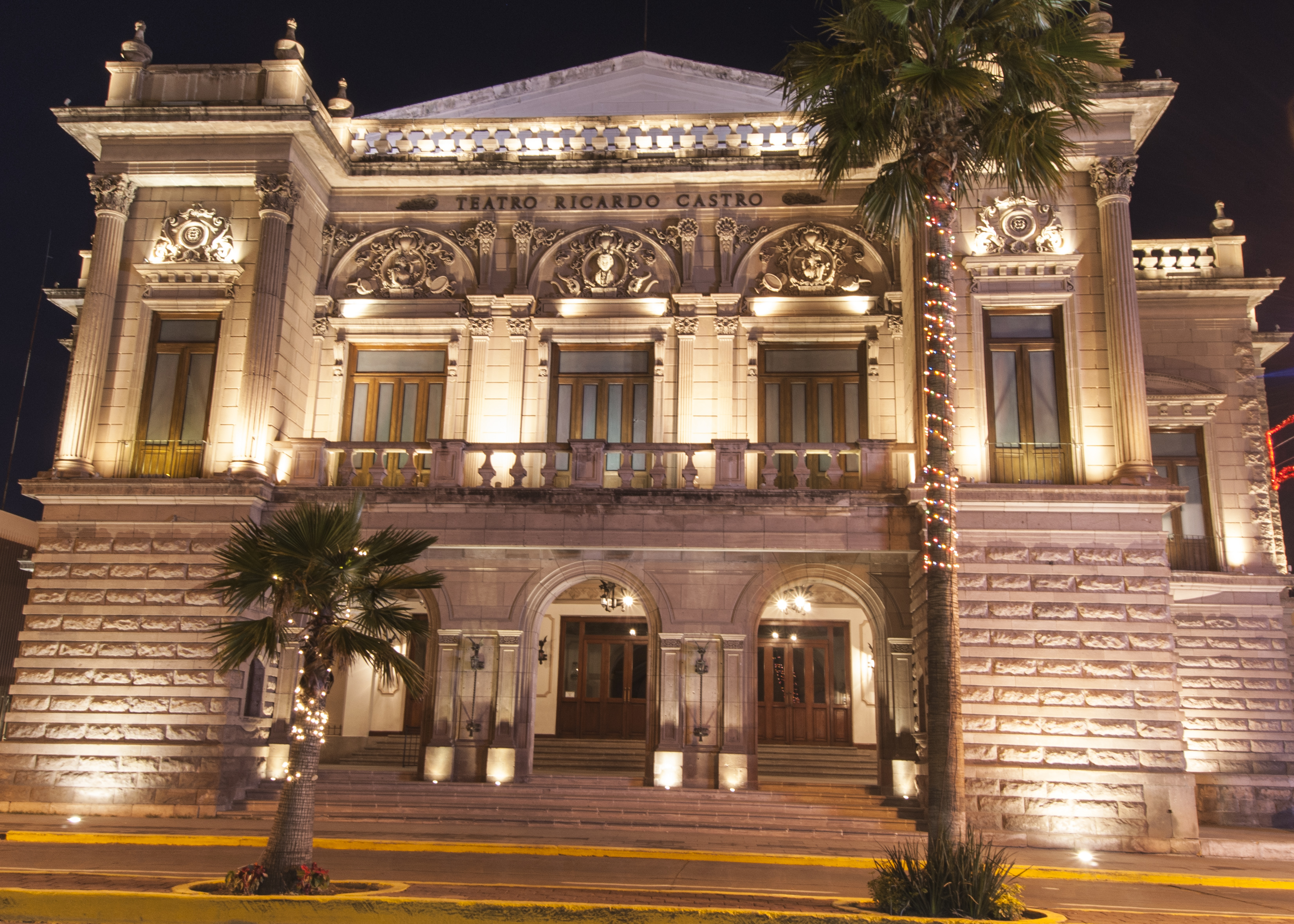
Teatro Ricardo Castro, Durango

Atzimba was staged again at Bellas Artes in 1952, (Note: With Rosa Rimoch in the title role.) following which the score for the second act was lost. In 2014, working from a recording of a radio broadcast of the 1952 production, composer Arturo Márquez Navarro reconstructed the orchestration for the second act. The reconstructed opera premiered at the Teatro Ricardo Castro in Victoria de Durango on 7 February 2014, to celebrate the 150th anniversary of the composer's birth, and was staged at Cuernavaca's Teatro Ocampo and at the Palacio de Bellas Artes in Mexico City later that year.

In 2020, during the COVID-19 pandemic, the National Institute of Fine Arts and Literature (INBAL) made a recording of the 2014 production available on its YouTube channel.

== Reception ==
The audience at the opera's 1900 production demanded an encore of the second act's intermezzo. The poet Amado Nervo described it as "a kind of Tarascan Aida... Luis G. Urbina said that Aida smells of Egypt. We would say that Atzimba smells of Michoacán."

For the 2014 revival, the conductor Enrique Patrón de Rueda described Márquez's reconstruction work as "very respectful of Ricardo Castro's melodies and ideas". He said that Márquez had studied the opera very closely and that the result was homogeneous and a true homage to Castro's work.
