= Benigno Montoya Muñoz =

Mexican artist (1865–1929)

- Born: 1865
- Died: 1929 (aged 63–64)
- Other name: Benigno Montoya
- Occupations: architect, painter, sculptor

Benigno Montoya Muñoz (1865–1929), also known as Benigno Montoya, was a Mexican architect, painter, and sculptor. He is best known for his funerary art and sculpture in Durango, Mexico. In 2002, his work at the Pantéon de Oriente was honored with the establishment of the Museo de Arte Funerario Benigno Montoya.

== Biography ==
Benigno Montoya Muñoz (1865–1929) was a Mexican architect, sculptor and painter. A skilled quarry master whose sculptures and funerary works are considered to be distinguished and unique, Montoya Muñoz started an apprenticeship working alongside his father at the age of twelve. After joining the family business, it soon became apparent that Montoya Muñoz had a talent for creating sculptures in the Neo-classical and Neo-gothic style (he favored the neo-gothic style) that were popular in Mexico at the time. Throughout his life, Montoya Muñoz would work primarily on religious buildings, turning to funerary work after the Mexican Religious Revolution of the early 1900s prevented his ability to work on cathedrals and temples.

=== Early life ===
Born to Jesús Montoya and Hesiquia Muñoz Montoya, Benigno Montoya Muñoz was born in the Mexican state of Zacatecas on February 13, 1865. Soon after his birth, Montoya Muñoz’s father, Jesus Montoya, moved the family to the neighboring state of Durango to the west, a place that Montoya Muñoz would consider his hometown. The Montoya family had a long history of stonemason and quarry sculpture artists. Benigno Montoya Muñoz joined his family in this tradition when he turned twelve and began to learn the art of stone sculpture under his father, Jesús.

=== Family ===
Parents were Jesús Montoya and Hesiquia Muñoz Montoya. It is known that Montoya Muñoz had at least one sister, Teresa Montoya Muñoz. He married Virginia De La Cruz Salazar and had at least one son with her, Francisco Montoya De La Cruz, an artist as well.

=== Career ===
Benigno Montoya Muñoz's career was centered primarily in the state of Durango and he would occasionally travel to nearby states for commissioned work. Working predominantly in religious stone work, Montoya Muñoz's work is largely styled after the Neo-classical design, a style that was very popular in Mexico at the time. Montoya Muñoz also enjoyed working in the Neo-gothic style, favoring this style above others. Before the Mexican Revolution of 1910-1920, Montoya Muñoz would work on temples and cathedrals, but during the Mexican Revolution it would become harder to find commissioned work with the Catholic Church. Financial hardship had Montoya Muñoz looking elsewhere for work and he began taking commissions in funerary work, where he continued to excel in his career, until his death in 1929.

== Notable works ==
=== Temples and cathedrals ===
1. Palacio del Arzobispado, 1885: Chapel and Facade.
2. Templo San Juan Bautista de Analco in the city of Durango, ca. 1890: Tower and Altar.
3. Templo de San Agustin, Victoria de Durango, ca. 1890: Facade and Main Altar.
4. Lajas Hacienda, 1895: Ornamentation.
5. San Agustin Temple, 1896: Built the canopy on the Main altar and worked on the West portal.
6. Commissioned by Mrs. Ángela Flores to work on Nuestra Señora de los Ángeles, 1897.
7. Teatro Ricardo Castro, 1900: Portions of the facade.
8. Santiago Apóstol in Valle de Allende, Chihuahua: Reconstruction of the parish with his father, Jesús Montoya.
9. San Miguel: Built a new altar with his father, Jesus Montoya and his uncle, Matías Montoya.

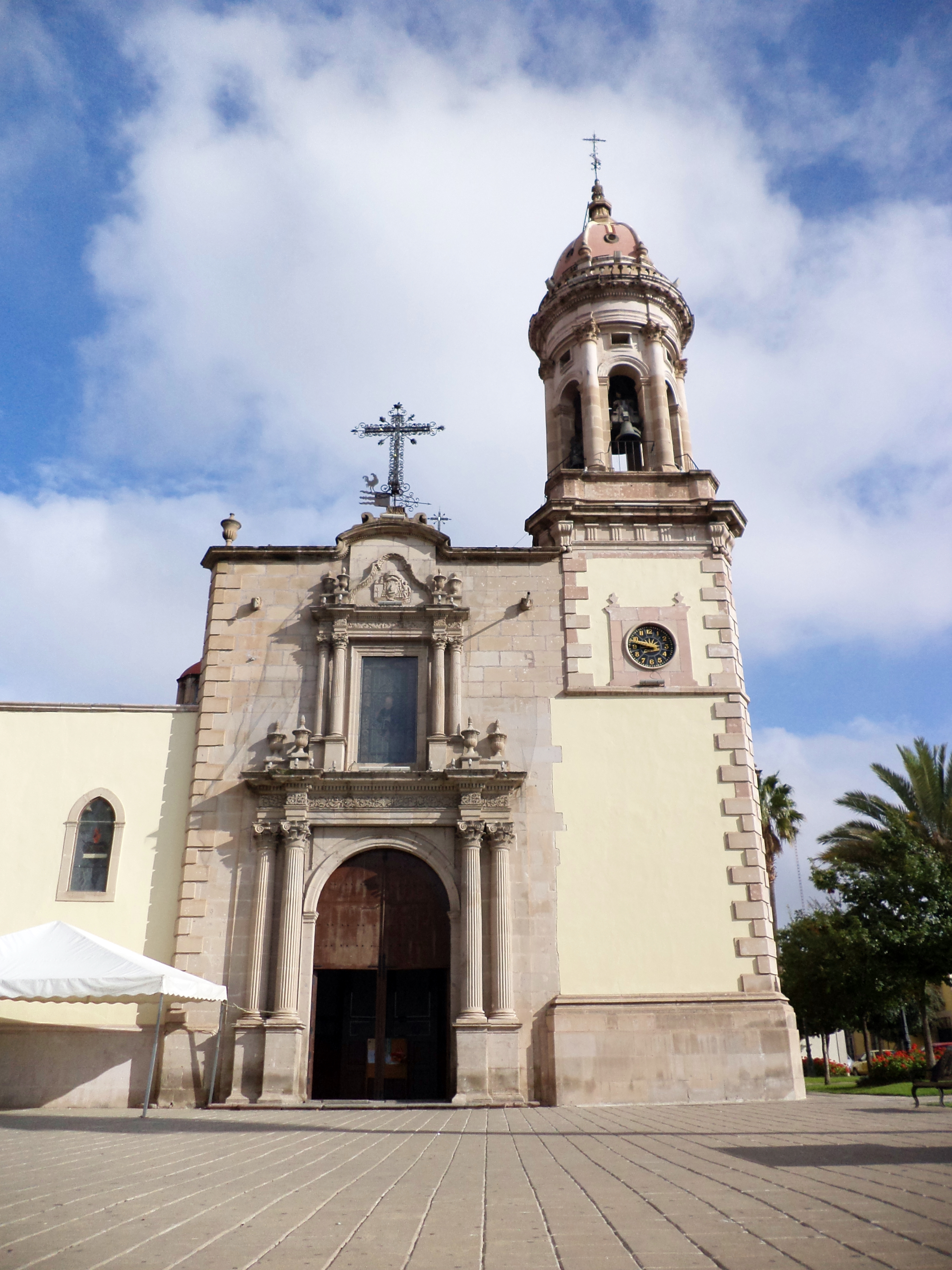
Benigno Montoya Muñoz worked on Templo San Agustin's facade, ca. 1890.

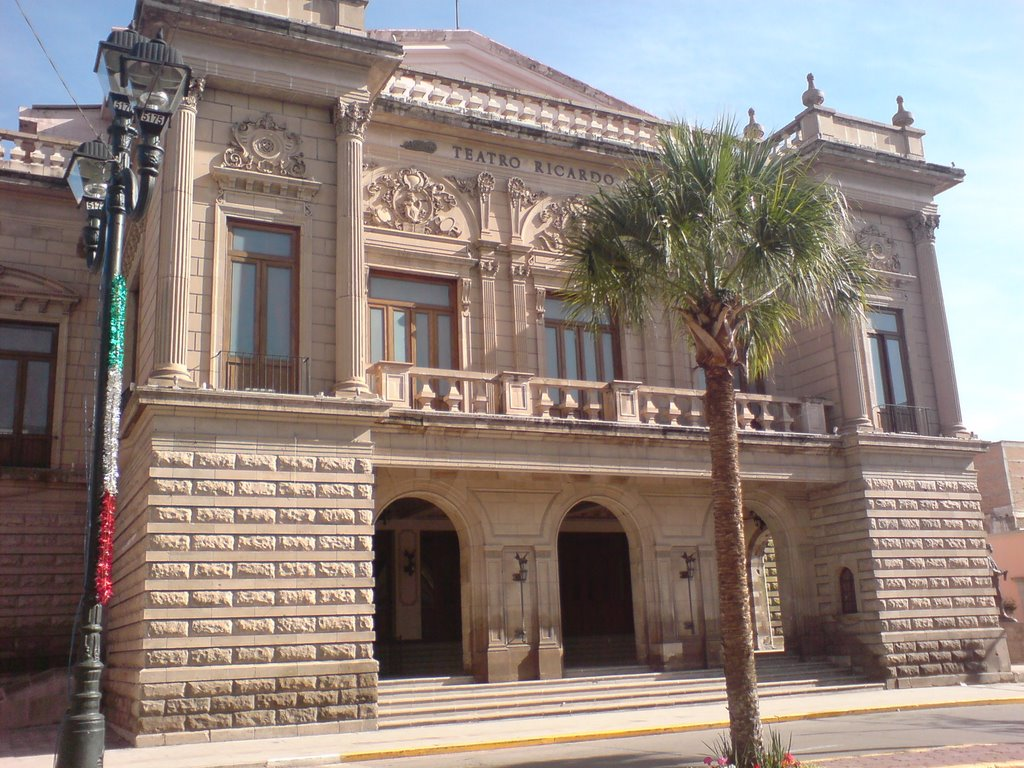
Montoya Muñoz worked on portions of the Teatro Ricardo Castro's facade in the year 1900.

=== Museo de Arte Funerario Benigno Montoya ===
In 2002, Pantéon de Oriente, a cemetery in Durango, Mexico, had dedicated the Museo de Arte Funerario Benigno Montoya. The museum was established to honor Benigno Montoya Muñoz and his more than 300 works (monuments, gravestones and sculptures) that still exist today. Many of the stone works that have been maintained and best represent the original work of Montoya Muñoz belong to the 19th century elite class of Durango: the family chapels. Montoya Muñoz's work at Pantéon de Oriente consists mainly of angels, many of which are carved to a true representation of the person buried underneath. Although Montoya Muñoz completed more than 300 sculptors in Pantéon de Oriente, each one is distinct and personal to the deceased.
