= Askar Abdrazakov =

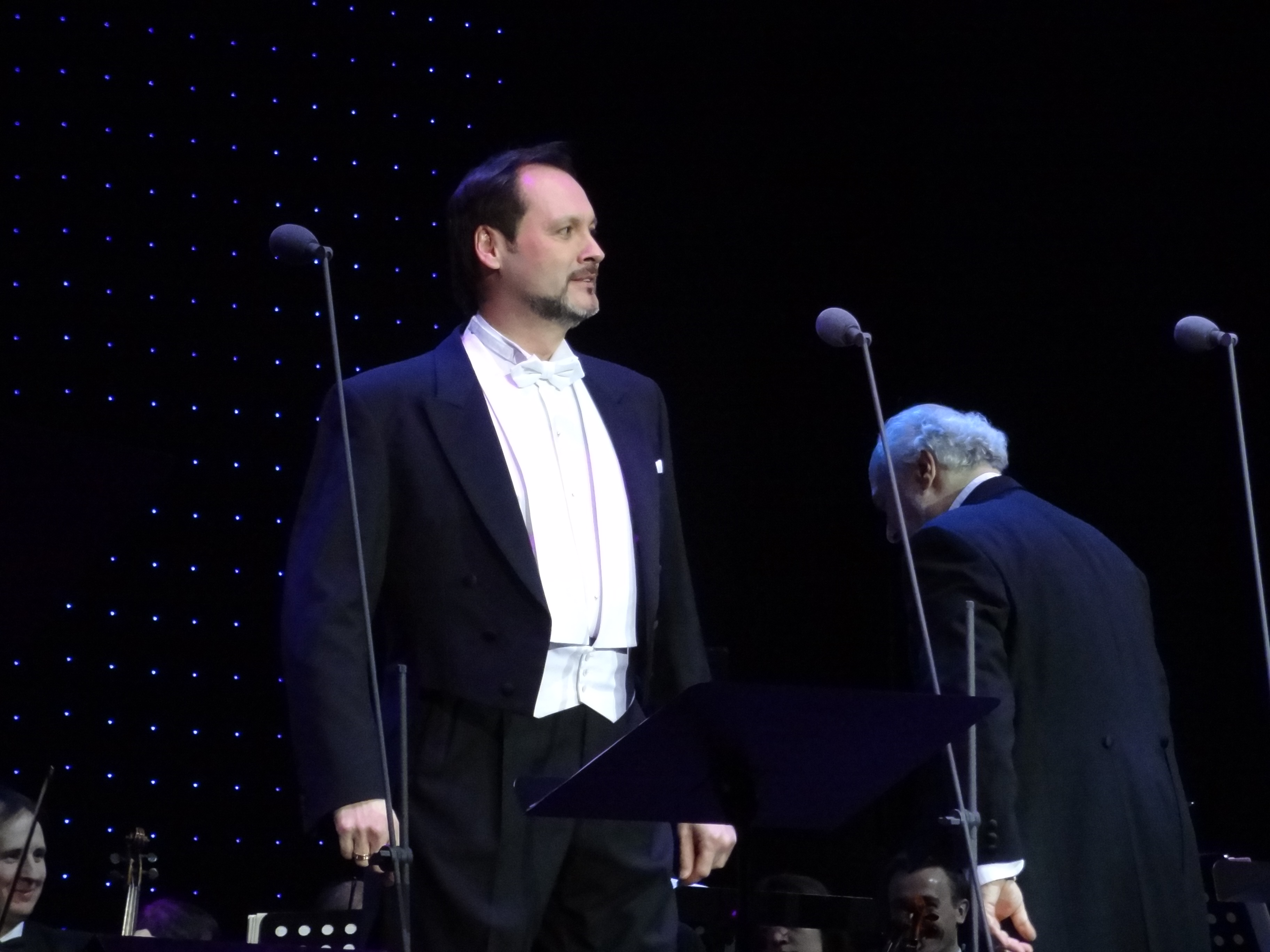
Askar Abdrazakov

Askar Abdrazakov (born July 11, 1960) is a Russian bass and opera director. He is currently artistic director of the Bashkir State Opera and Ballet Theater; a post he has served in since 2019.

== Biography ==
Askar Abdrazakov was born in Ufa on July 11, 1960. He was trained as an opera singer at the Ufa State Institute of Arts where he studied voice with Milyasha Murtazina. He pursued further vocal studies with Irina Arkhipova at the Moscow Conservatory.

In 1990 Abdrazakov became a member of the Bashkir State Opera and Ballet Theater (BSOBT); remaining as a principal artist there until 2010. Some of the roles he performed at the BSOBT included Basilio in The Barber of Seville, Count Walter in Luisa Miller, The Grand Inquisitor in Don Carlos, Kochubey in Mazeppa, Konchak in Prince Igor, Prince Gremin in Eugene Onegin, Raimondo Bidebent in Lucia di Lammermoor, Ramfis in Aida, Ruslan in Ruslan and Lyudmila, Sparafucile in Rigoletto, Vasily Stepanovich Sobakin in The Tsar's Bride, Zaccaria in Nabucco, Zuniga in Carmen, and the title roles in Attila and Boris Godunov.

In 1994 Abdrzakov portrayed the King in Aida at the South African State Theatre, and 1995 he portrayed the Ballad Singer in The Legend of the Invisible City of Kitezh and the Maiden Fevroniya at the Bregenz Festival. He appeared as a guest artist at the Teatro Lirico Giuseppe Verdi as Prince Gremmin (1996) and as The Grand Inquisitor (1997). In 1997 he performed the role of Bonze in The Nightingale at the Palais Garnier under Pierre Boulez, and repeated the King in Aida at the Arena di Verona Festival. He subsequently toured in The Nightingale for performances with the BBC Symphony Orchestra in Brussels, London, Rome, Seville and Berlin. He reprised the role of The Grand Inquisitor at the Teatro Comunale di Bologna in 1998.

In the 1998-1999 season Abdrzakov portrayed Figaro in Mozart's The Marriage of Figaro at the Mariinsky Theatre (MT). He later returned to the MT in 2013 in the title role of Massenet's Don Quichotte. He has since returned frequently to the MT as a guest artist; including reprising parts he had sung earlier in his career like Don Basilio, Konchak, Prince Gremin, Ruslan, and Sparafucile. Other roles he has sung at the MT include The King of Clubs in The Love for Three Oranges, Lorenzo in I Capuleti e i Montecchi, Méphistophélès in Faust, Narbal in Les Troyens, Philip II in Don Carlo, Sarastro in The Magic Flute, and the title roles in Don Giovanni and The Tale of Tsar Saltan.

In 1999 Abdrzakov created the title role in the world premiere of Sergei Slonimsky’s Visions of Ivan the Terrible which was conducted by Mstislav Rostropovich in Samara. He was artistic director of the Chaliapin Dacha Festiva held at the Chaliapin Memorial Dacha Museum from 2015 to 2018. Since 2019 he has served as artistic director of the BSOBT; a position he remains in as of 2026.

In 2021 he was named a Honoured Artist of Russia.
