= Juan Reynoso =

Juan Reynoso may refer to:

- Juan Reynoso (footballer) (born 1969), Peruvian footballer
- Juan Reynoso Portillo (1912–2007), Mexican violinist
