= Vasily Andreyev =

Russian musician (1861–1918)

Vasily Vasilievich Andreyev
- Василий Васильевич Андреев
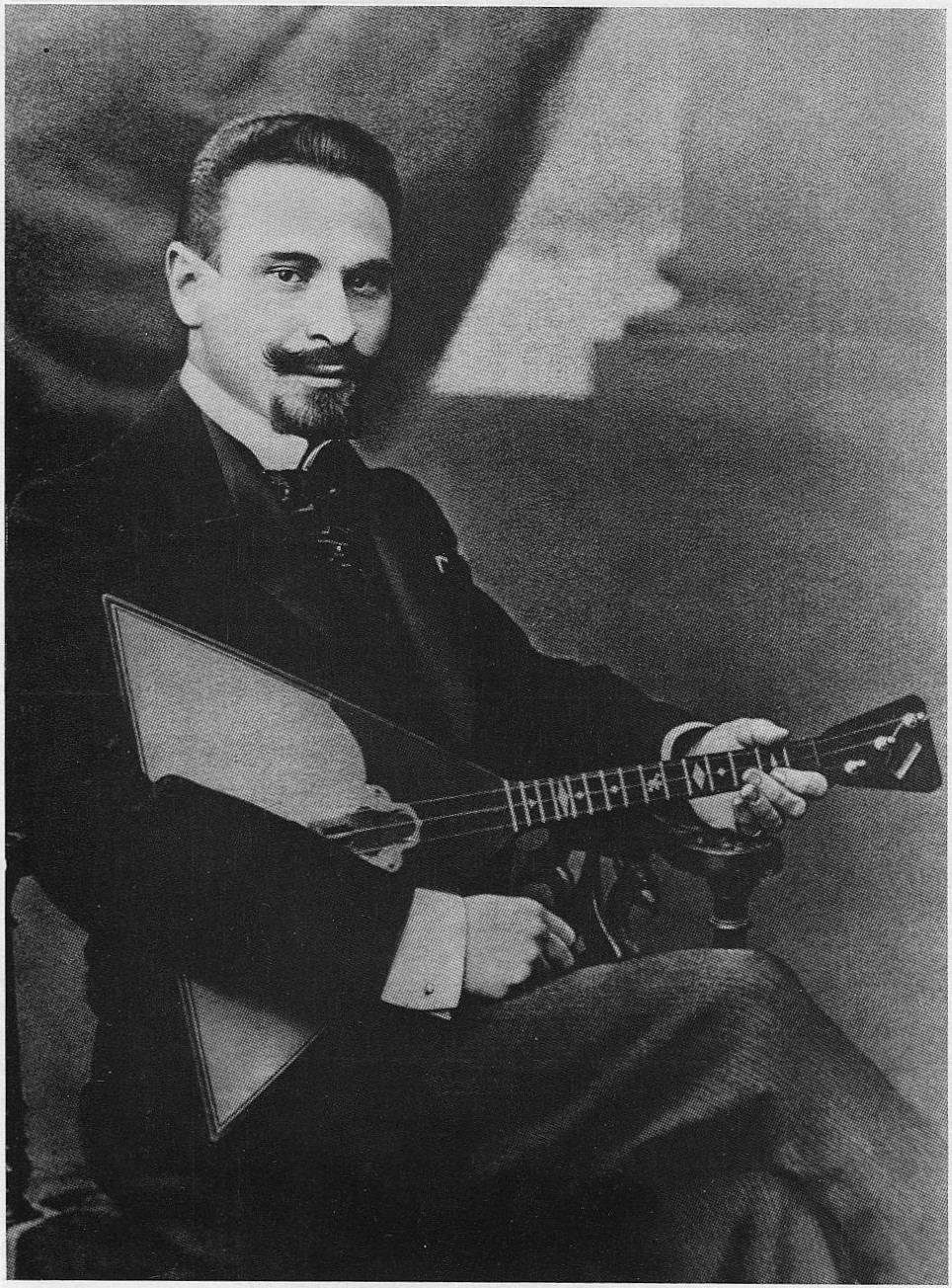
- Vasily Andreyev in 1880
- Born: January 15[O.S. January 3], 1861; Bezhetsk, Tver Governorate, Russian Empire
- Died: December 26, 1918 (aged 57)
- Occupations: Composer, orchestra leader

Vasily Vasilievich Andreyev (Russian: Васи́лий Васи́льевич Андре́ев; 15 January [O.S. 3 January] 1861 – 26 December 1918) was a Russian musician responsible for the modern development of the balalaika and several other traditional Russian folk music instruments, and is considered the father of the academic folk instrument movement in Eastern Europe.

His accomplishments included:

- developing in the 1880s a standardized balalaika made with the assistance of violin maker V. Ivanov.
- reviving the domra, a three-stringed long-necked melody instrument with a melon-shaped body, which he developed in prima, alto, tenor, and bass sizes.
- reviving the gusli, an autoharp chorded with piano-type keys.
- arranging many traditional Russian folk songs and melodies for the orchestra
- composing many tunes of his own.

== Biography ==
Vasily Andreyev was born in Bezhetsk, Tver Governorate, Russian Empire to the family of an honorary citizen of Bezhetsk and merchant of the first guild, Vasily Andeyevich Andreyev and his wife, the noblewoman Sophia Mikhaylovna Andreyeva. When the boy was one year old, his father died. The family moved to Saint Petersburg, where the boy was brought up by his stepfather, Nil Seslavin. At the age of ten, Vasily began playing the balalaika and other folk instruments.

Initially, Andreyev was studying to play the violin and working as a musician in the various salons catering to European tourists to the Russian capital. On numerous occasions, he was asked about performing traditional Russian music, and he started collecting examples. He once came upon a peasant playing a balalaika and had the instrument copied. His solo performances were very popular, and a group of players developed around him. He also developed an ensemble playing different sized balalaikas that proved to be very successful. Ultimately, the group grew into a full orchestra.

In 1887 Andreyev was inspired by Ginislao Paris' mandolin orchestra. Paris' orchestra was the first mandolin orchestra in Russia, and, similarly, Andreyev put together the first orchestra based on Russian instruments.

The popularity of Andreyev's group grew significantly after their performance in Paris, France at the world Exhibition, where they became celebrities.

== The Great Russian Orchestra ==
In 1881 Andreyev organized his Great Russian orchestra that included string instruments: four types of domras, six types of balalaika, gusli, woodwind instruments: zhaleikas; percussion instruments: makras (a sort of timpani), bubens. Many instruments were heavily customized to work in an orchestra setting. In a few years, the orchestra became famous, generating thousands of followers as well as causing an explosion of balalaika compositions.

== Criticism ==
Still many members of the intelligentsia criticized the orchestra and its instruments for being not Russian (as the name implies) but Turkish. More recently, Iurii Boiko pointed out in 1984 that the orchestra's technique of playing a melody in the form of a sustained tremolo on one string – much copied and widely thought of as "Russian" in style (witness Maurice Jarre's film score for David Lean's Doctor Zhivago) – is in fact not a Russian manner of playing at all; rather, it was a technique borrowed by Andreyev from the Neapolitan mandolin orchestra.

This new form of folk music gained international popularity after Andreyev's many concert tours in Great Britain between 1900 and 1910.
