= Ricardo Castro =

Ricardo Castro may refer to:

- Ricardo Castro (composer) (1864-1907), Mexican composer and pianist
- Ricardo Castro (footballer) (born 1955), Mexican footballer
- Ricardo Castro Beeche (1894-1967), Costa Rican lawyer, politician and writer
- Ricardo Castro Ríos (1920-2001), Spanish-Argentine film actor
- Ricardo L. Castro (born 1942), Colombian-Canadian architectural photographer, critic, and educator
