= Irina Arkhipova =

Russian opera singer (1925–2010)

Irina Arkhipova Ирина Архипова
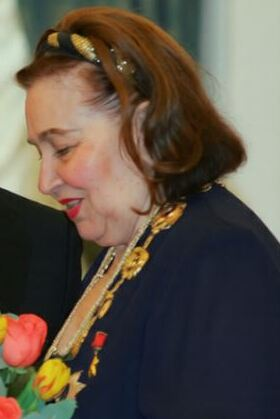
- Arkhipova in 2005

Background information
- Born: Irina Konstantinovna Vetoshkina; 2 January 1925; Moscow, Russian SFSR, Soviet Union
- Died: 11 February 2010 (aged 85) Moscow, Russia
- Occupations: Singer (mezzo-soprano, contralto)

Irina Konstantinovna Arkhipova (Note: Russian: Ирина Константиновна Архипова, romanized: Irina Konstantinovna Arkhipova) (née Vetoshkina, (Note: Russian: Ирина Константиновна Ветошкина, romanized: Irina Konstantinovna Vetoshkina) 2 January 1925 – 11 February 2010) was a Soviet and Russian mezzo-soprano, and later contralto, opera singer. She sang leading roles first in Russia at the Sverdlovsk Opera and the Bolshoi Theatre, and then throughout Europe and in the United States. People's Artist of the USSR (1966) and Hero of Socialist Labour (1984).

== Biography ==
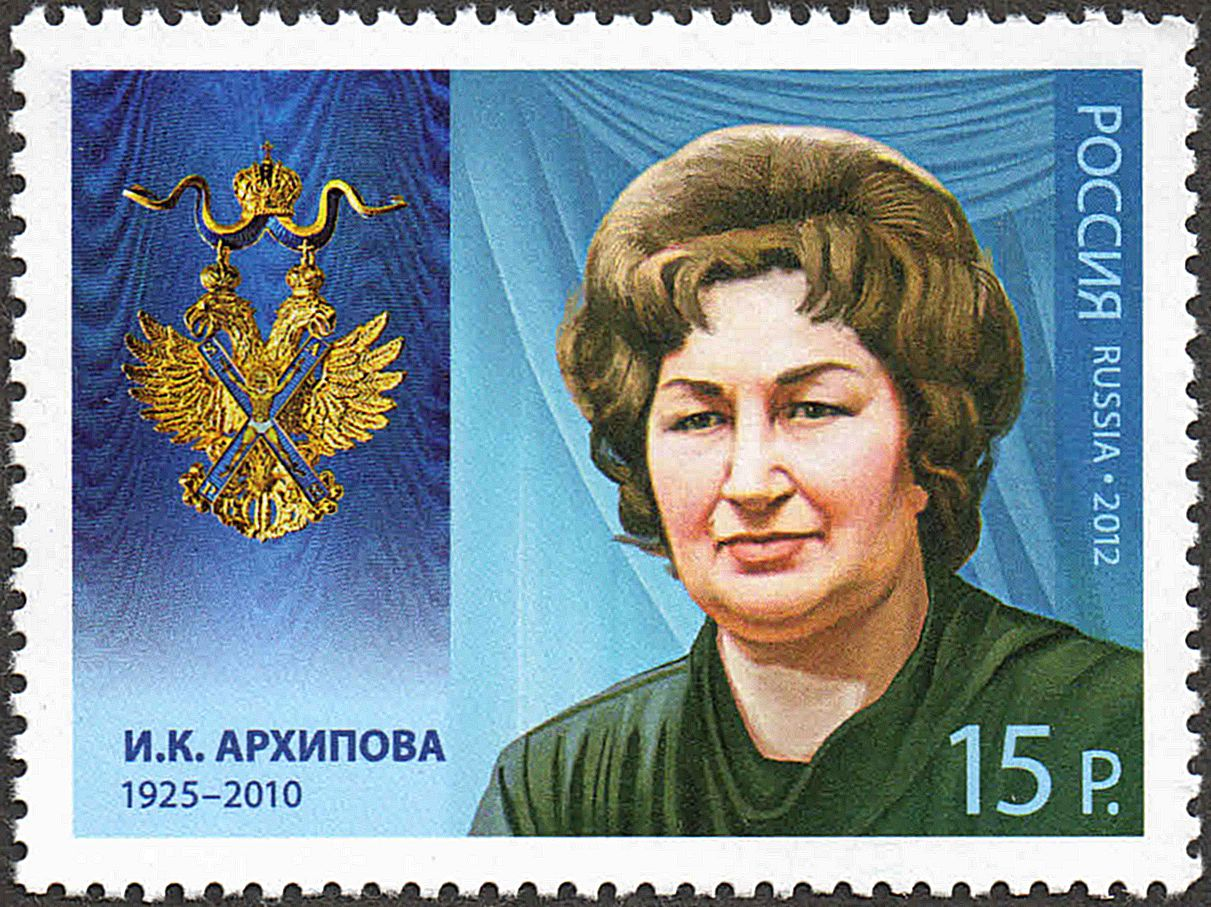
Arkhipova on a 2012 Russian stamp

Irina Arkhipova was born in Moscow. Before switching to voice, she studied architecture at the Moscow Architectural Institute, graduating in 1948. She then studied at the Moscow Conservatory. In 1954 she debuted in Sverdlovsk, and was made a member of the Bolshoi Theatre in 1956. She became a member of the Communist Party of the Soviet Union in 1963 and was named a People's Artist of the USSR in 1966.

Arkhipova was at the height of her career in the 1960s and 1970s, during which time she was an international star, interpreting both Russian and Italian repertoire. Her technique was irreproachable, and she had great expressive power. She has been compared with Christa Ludwig. One of her most celebrated roles is as Marfa in Khovanshchina by Modest Mussorgsky, as recorded with Boris Khaykin in 1972. At the age of 72, Arkhipova finally made a belated Metropolitan Opera debut in March 1997 as Filipyevna in Eugene Onegin. She was also a voice teacher in Moscow where one of her students was Askar Abdrazakov.

She died in Moscow on 11 February 2010, at age 85, and is buried at Novodevichy Cemetery in Moscow.

== Repertoire ==
- Giuseppe Verdi
  - Aida (Amneris)
  - Don Carlos (Eboli)
  - Il trovatore (Azucena)
  - Un ballo in maschera (Ulrica)
  - Falstaff (Meg Page)
- Pyotr Ilyich Tchaikovsky
  - Eugene Onegin (Filippyevna)
  - The Maid of Orleans (Joan of Arc)
  - The Queen of Spades (Countess)
  - Mazeppa (Lyubov)
  - The Enchantress (Princess Yevpraksiya Romanovna)
- Nikolai Rimsky-Korsakov
  - The Tsar's Bride (Lyubasha)
  - Sadko (Lyubava Buslayevna)
  - The Snow Maiden (Spring Beauty)
- Sergei Prokofiev
  - War and Peace (Hélène)
  - The Story of a Real Man (Klaudiya Michailovna)
- Modest Mussorgsky
  - Boris Godunov (Marina)
  - Khovanshchina (Marfa)
- Alexander Dargomyzhsky
  - The Stone Guest (Laura)
- Richard Wagner
  - Das Rheingold (Fricka)
- Georges Bizet
  - Carmen (Carmen)
- Jules Massenet
  - Werther (Charlotte)
- Pietro Mascagni
  - Cavalleria rusticana (Santuzza)
- Christoph Willibald Gluck
  - Iphigénie en Aulide (Clytemnestra)
- Tikhon Khrennikov
  - Mother (Nilovna)
- Vano Muradeli
  - October (Countess)

== Honours and awards ==
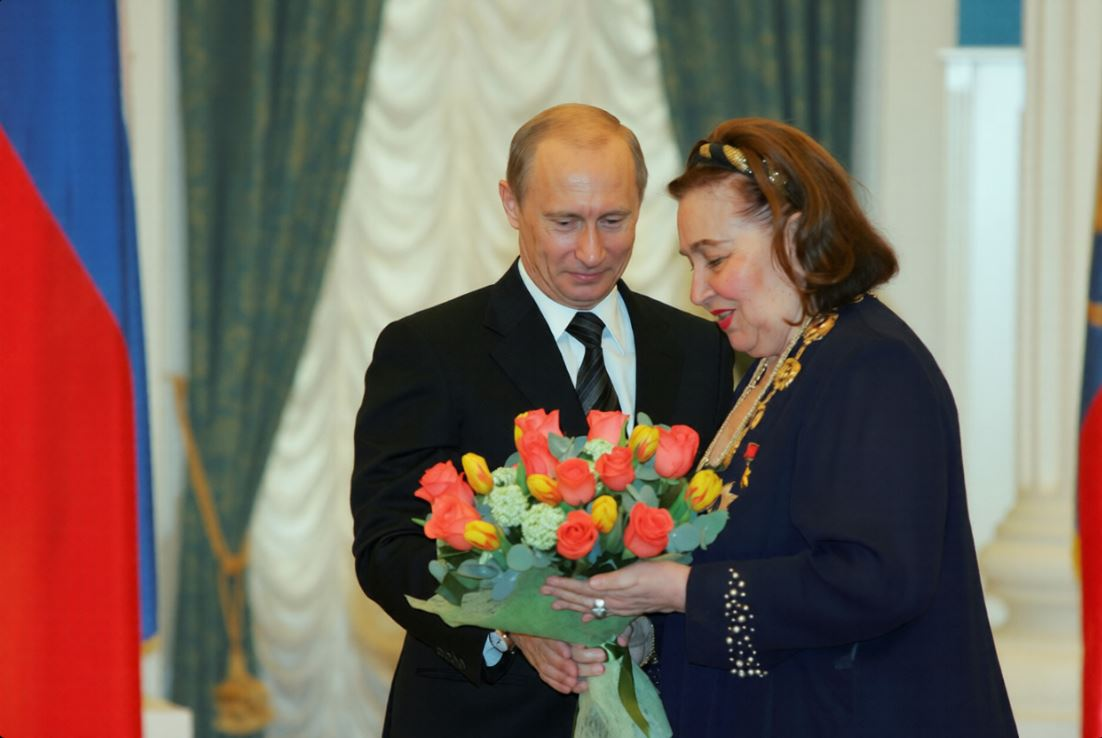
Arkhipova receiving the Order of St. Andrew

- Hero of Socialist Labour (Decree of the Presidium of the Supreme Soviet of 29 December 1984)
- Order of St. Andrew (2 January 2005) – for outstanding contributions to the development of domestic and world music, many years of creative and social activities
- Order "For Merit to the Fatherland", 2nd class (30 December 30, 1999) – for outstanding achievements in the field of culture and great contributions to the development of a national songwriting [8]
- Three Orders of Lenin (1971, 25 May 1976)
- Order of the Red Banner of Labour (1971)
- Medal of Pushkin (4 June 1999) – to mark the 200th anniversary of Pushkin for services in the field of culture, education, literature and art
- Medal "In commemoration of the 100th anniversary of the birth of Vladimir Ilyich Lenin" (1970)
- Diploma of the President of the Russian Federation (2 January 2010) – for great contribution to music education [10]
- Order of Saint Olga, 2nd class (Russian Orthodox Church, 2000)
- Order of the Republic (Moldova) (2000)
- Cross of Saint Michael of Tver (2000)
- Badge of Honour "For mercy and charity" (2000)
- Badge of Honour "For services to Polish culture"
- Honour of St. Luke – culture of the Yaroslavl region.
- Lenin Prize (1978) – for her performances as Azucena in Verdi's opera "Il Trovatore," and Lyubava in Rimsky-Korsakov's "Sadko," as well as concerts in recent years
- State Prize of the Russian Federation (1996)
- Russian opera prize "Casta diva" (1999)
- Prize in Moscow (2000)
- Prizes and medals Rachmaninov
- World of Art Award (established by the corporation "Marisha Art Management International") – "Diamond Lira" and the title "Goddess of Art" (1996)
- Honored Artist of the RSFSR (1959)
- People's Artist of the RSFSR (1961)
- People's Artist of the USSR (1966)
- People's Artist of the Republic of Kyrgyzstan
- People's Artist of the Republic of Bashkortostan (1994)
- Honored Artist of Udmurtia
- Honorary Doctor of the Moldovan National Academy of Music (1998)
- Honorary Doctor of RCTU (2001)
- Professor of Moscow State Conservatory

Arkhipova was entered into the Russian Book of Records as the most titled Russian singer. Minor planet number 4424 was named "Arkhipova," in 1995.

== Sources ==
- Rosenthal, H. and Warrack, J. (eds.), "Arkhipova, Irina", The Concise Oxford Dictionary of Opera, 2nd Edition, Oxford University Press, 1979. p. 18.
