= Domra =

Russian string musical instrument

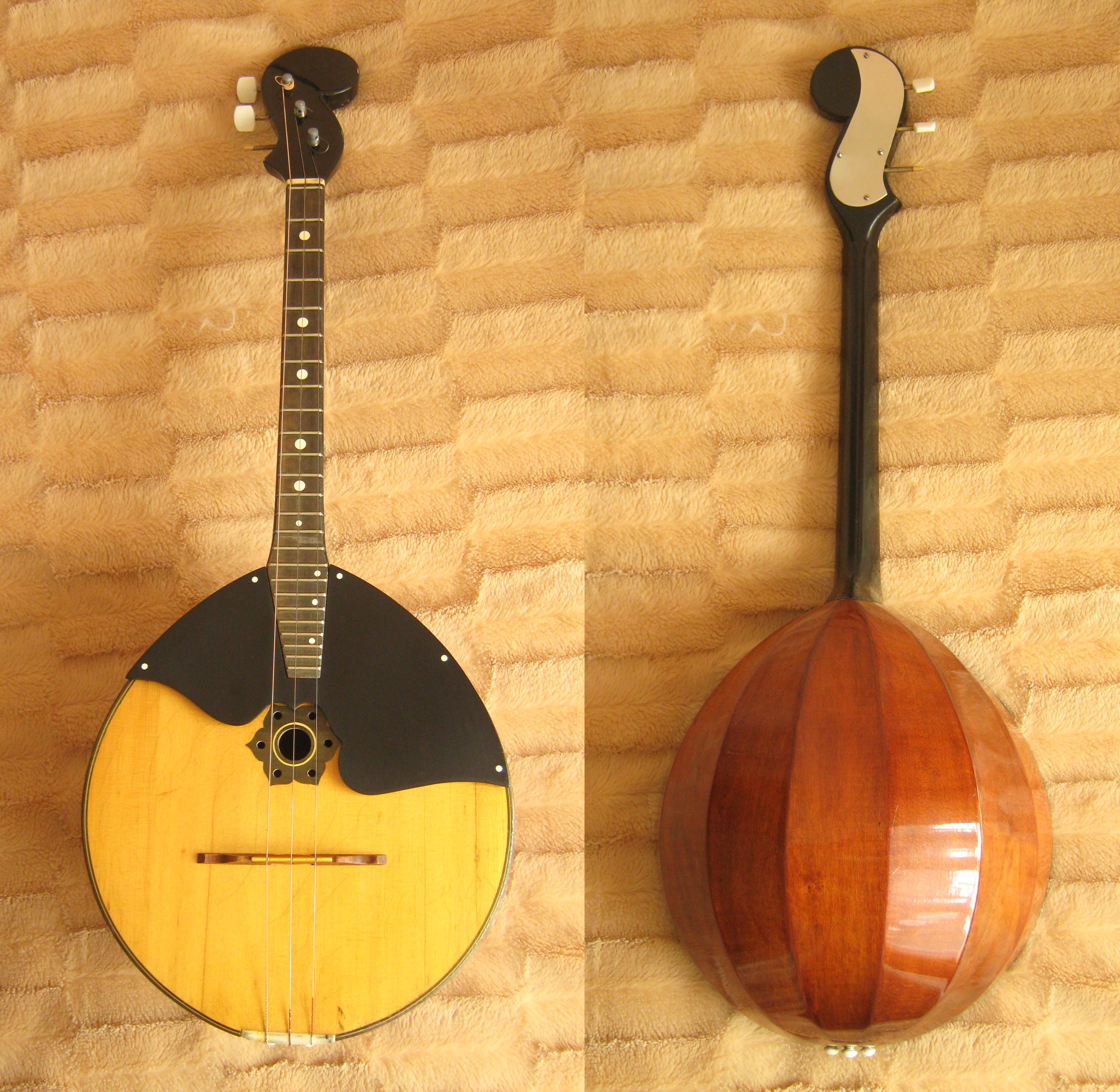

String instrument
- Classification: Plucked string instrument
- Hornbostel–Sachs classification: 321.321 (Composite chordophone)

Playing range

Related instruments
- Balalaika, mandolin

The domra (Russian: домра, Russian pronunciation: [ˈdɔmrɑ], pl. домры, domry) is a long-necked Russian folk string instrument of the lute family. It has a round body and three or four metal strings.

== Name ==
According to A. S. Famintsyn, domra is the russified form of Arabic tanbura.

== History ==
The first known written mention of the domra is in Admonitions of Metropolitan Daniel (1530). This musical instrument gained great popularity in the 16th–17th centuries, replacing the gusli. There are numerous mentions of the domra in historic documents of this period. For instance, Alphabet (1654), in the Moscow Synodal Library, says: "As to what musikiia is: Musikiia, playing, that is, the sounding of gusli and kiniry, or lyres, and domry, and similar things".

In addition, medieval Russian illuminated manuscripts of the Psalter contain images of musicians with necked plucked-string instruments, and some of those miniatures are clearly captioned "depiction of domras". Judging by those images, late medieval Russian domry can be divided into two types: lute-shaped, which had five to six strings, a large body and а pegbox angled back, and tanbur-shaped, which had three to four strings, a small body and a straight pegbox.

After the pious Tsar Alexis of Russia issued an edict ordering the persecution of Russian folk musicians and destruction of their instruments (1648), the domra gradually came into disuse and was replaced by the balalaika, which was much easier to make and play. According to the edict:

Whenever domras appear, they should be confiscated and, after those objects of demonic games are broken, burned. And people who play them should be beaten and sent to the end of our state.

In 1896, a student of Vasily Vasilievich Andreyev found a broken instrument in a stable in rural Russia. It was thought that this instrument may have been an example of a domra, although at that time no illustrations or examples of the traditional domra were known to exist (the traditional domra was only known through numerous mentions in folklore, though examples existed of the dombra, a related Turkic instrument). A three-stringed version of this instrument was later redesigned in 1896, patented, and introduced into the orchestra of Russian folk instruments.

== Orchestral instruments ==
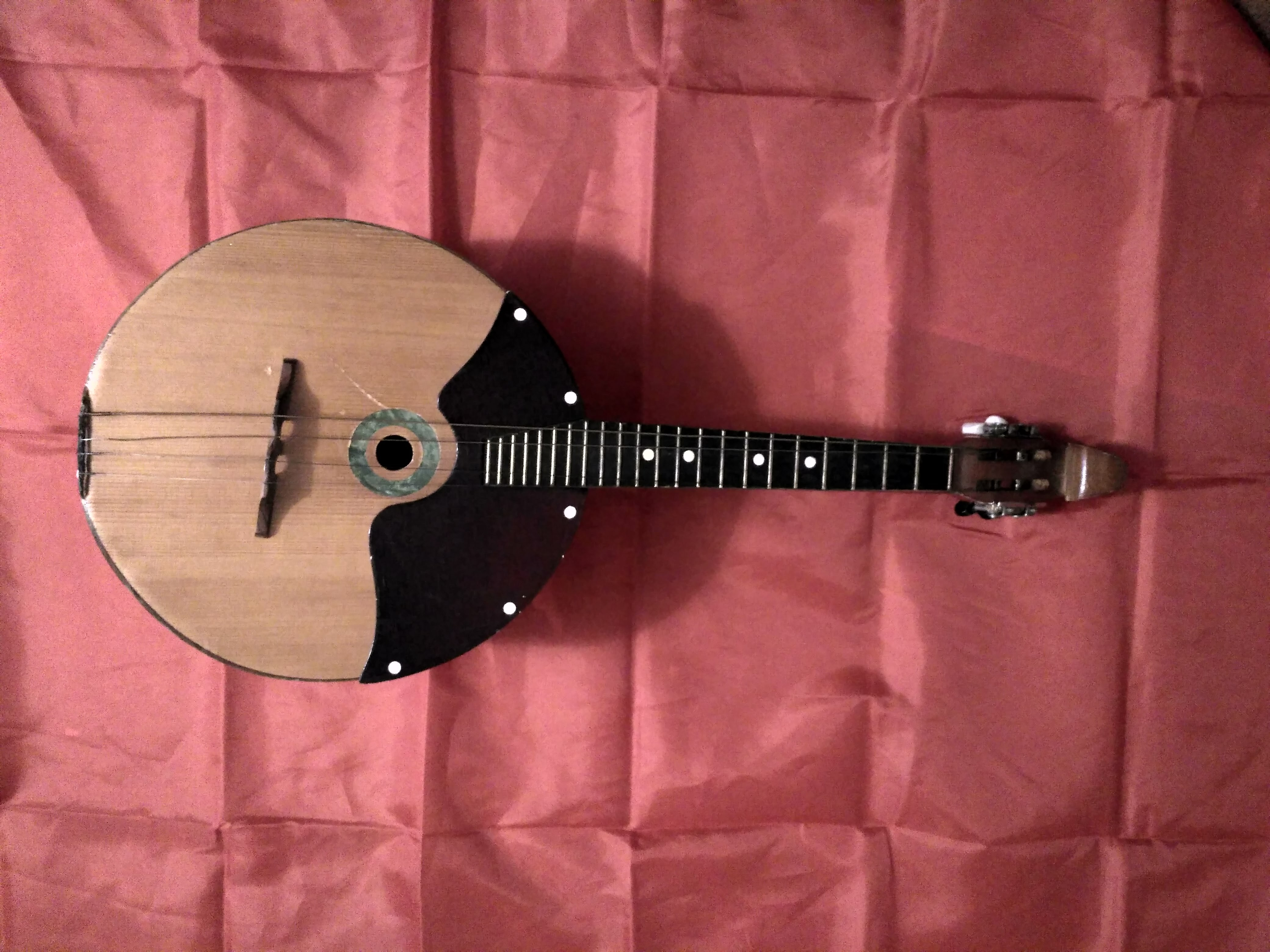
A Soviet-made 4 string Ukrainian domra

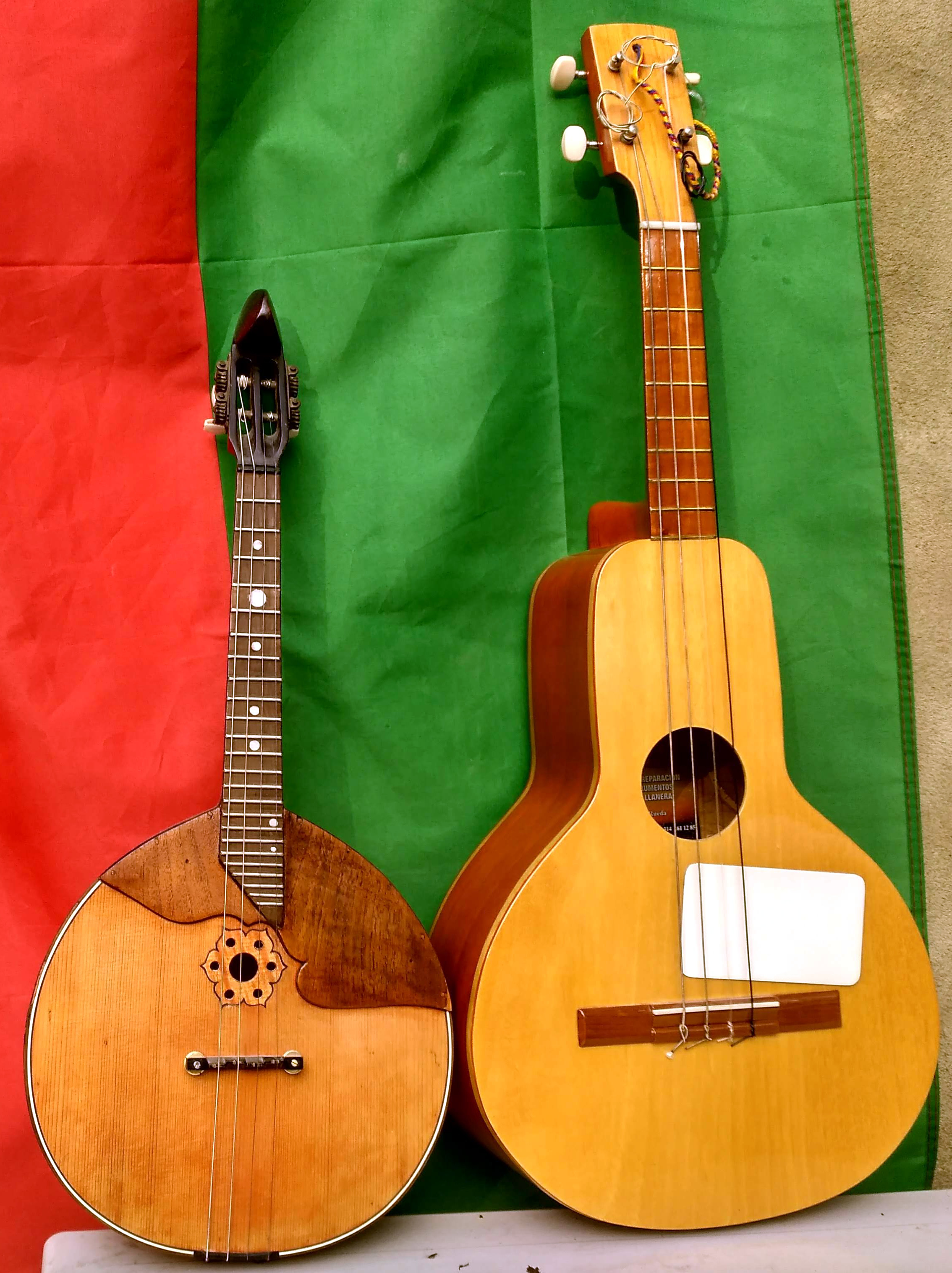
Domra (left) and Bandola Llanera (right)

The basic domra is tuned as follows:

- Three strings: EAD tuning.
- Four strings: GDAE tuning (like the mandolin or the violin) which makes it essentially a four-string acoustic mandolin.

The four-string electric mandolin is essentially an electrified four-string domra prima due to the number of strings and tuning.

Instruments are made in various sizes including piccolo, prima, alto, tenor, bass, and contrabass.

- Piccolo: b1 e2 a2
- Prima: e1 a1 d2
- Mezzo-soprano: b e1 a1
- Alto: e a d1
- Tenor: B e a
- Bass: E A d
- Contrabass (minor): 1E 1A D
- Contrabass (major): 1A D G

== Performers ==
Tamara Volskaya is considered to be one of the leading contemporary performers on the domra.

Aleksandr Tsygankov is considered to be one of the leading contemporary performers, teachers, and composers of the 3 string domra.

== See also ==
- Balalaika
- Mandolin

== Bibliography ==
- "Домра" . Brockhaus and Efron Encyclopedic Dictionary (in Russian). 1906.
- Findeizen, Nikolai (7 February 2008). History of Music in Russia from Antiquity to 1800, Volume 1: From Antiquity to the Beginning of the Eighteenth Century. Indiana University Press. ISBN 978-0-253-02637-8.
- Imkhanitskii, Mikhail I. (2018). Istoriia ispolnitel'stva na russkikh narodnykh instrumentakh (The history of performance on Russian folk instruments). Moscow: Gnessin State Musical College.
