= Anduaga =

Anduaga is a surname. Notable people with the surname include:

- Baltasar Anduaga y Espinosa (1817–1861), Spanish politician, jurist, writer, and translator
- Xabier Anduaga (born 1995), Spanish operatic tenor
