= Operalia =

Classical music competition

- Operalia Foundation, Inc.
- Nickname: Operalia
- Established: 1993; 33 years ago
- Founder: Plácido Domingo
- Founded at: Calabasas, California
- Type: Nonprofit organization
- Registration no.: 95-4857653
- Legal status: Foundation
- Board of directors: Plácido Domingo (Chairman); Don E. Franzen (Secretary); Alvaro Domingo (Note: son of Plácido Domingo) Treasurer
- Key people: Mihela Douet (Office Manager); Dominic Domingo (Note: grandson of Plácido Domingo) (Program Assistant)
- Revenue: $ 1.900.749 (2018)
- Expenses: $ 933.114 (2018)
- Website: operaliacompetition.org

Plácido Domingo's Operalia, The World Opera Competition is an annual international competition for opera singers, founded by Plácido Domingo in 1993.

== Overview ==
The competition's parent organization, Operalia Foundation, is a nonprofit organization based in Beverly Hills, California, with postal address in New York City's Upper West Side. The competition itself takes place in different cities each year. Cities which have hosted the competition include Paris at both the Palais Garnier and Théâtre du Châtelet, Mexico City in one of the Televisa Recording Studios, Madrid at the Teatro de la Zarzuela, Bordeaux at the Grand Théâtre, Tokyo at the Kan'i Hoken Hall, Hamburg at the Laeiszhalle, Puerto Rico at the Luis A. Ferré Performing Arts Center, Los Angeles at both UCLA's Royce Hall and the Dorothy Chandler Pavilion, Washington, D.C. at George Washington University's Lisner Auditorium, Austria, Germany and Switzerland, Madrid at the Teatro Real, Valencia at the Palau de les Arts Reina Sofía, Québec at the Palais Montcalm and Grand Théâtre de Québec, Astana at Astana Opera, Lisbon at the Teatro Nacional de São Carlos and Prague at the National Theatre.

== Rules ==
The competition is open to singers of all voice types between the ages of 18 and 32 who are already performing professionally. Applicants are required to submit two recent video recordings of them singing with piano or live orchestra. Based on these submissions, 40 singers get selected for the competition. According to Operalia, the organization receives 800 to 1.000 submissions each year, other sources speak of "hundreds" of applications.

The jury is presided over by Domingo, although he himself does not judge the competition. Among jury members are Domingo's wife Marta Domingo, singers, opera directors, casting directors, artistic directors and consultants of renowned opera houses.

Competitors must prepare four arias. Two additional zarzuela arias are required for the optional zarzuela competition. In the first round each of the 40 singers gets to choose one aria they want to sing, the jury selects a second aria and the zarzuela aria from the contestant's list. Twenty singers are eliminated in the first round. The second round involves the performance of one aria chosen by the jury, after which ten singers proceed to the final round. For the final round, singers choose one aria and one zarzuela from their list.

While the jury deliberates the numerous winners, the audience votes for their favorite female and male singers. The final round is performed with orchestra, quarter and semi finals are with piano accompaniment.

== Prizes ==
In the general competition 1st prize, 2nd prize, and 3rd prize are awarded. Winners of the zarzuela competition receive the Plácido Domingo Ferrer Prize or Pepita Embil Prize, named after Domingo's parents. The audience prize is a wristwatch by the competition's main sponsor. The San Juan, Puerto Rico based nonprofit organization CulturArte de Puerto Rico is sponsoring the CulturArte Prize. Performers of German repertoire by Richard Strauss or Richard Wagner can receive the Birgit Nilsson Prize. Prizes can be shared, in the past by up to 4 singers for one prize. It is also possible for a singer to receive several awards. Up to 17 prizes have been awarded in a single year. Since 2017, finalists who didn't win a prize receive an Encouragement Award.

== Chances of winning ==
In the 27 competitions from 1993 to 2019, 219 singers received prizes. 151 received one prize, 52 two, 15 three, and one singer received four prizes at the Lisbon competition in 2018. The most prizes had been awarded at the competition in 2009, with 17 prizes for 10 singers. Without counting the Encouragement Award, one out of five singers received a prize.

== List of winners ==
Year, place	Prize(s)	Name	Voice type	Country
2024, Mumbai	1st Prize	Kathleen O’Mara	soprano	United States
2024, Mumbai	1st Prize	Le Bu	bass	China
2024, Mumbai	2nd Prize	Elmina Hasan	mezzo-soprano	Azerbaijan
2024, Mumbai	2nd Prize	Angel Romero	tenor	United States
2024, Mumbai	3rd Prize	Sun-Ly Pierce	mezzo-soprano	United States
2024, Mumbai	3rd Prize	Meridian Prall	mezzo-soprano	United States
2024, Mumbai	3rd Prize	Polina Shabunina	soprano	Russia
2024, Mumbai	3rd Prize	Vladislav Chizhov	baritone	Russia
2024, Mumbai	Zarzuela Prize	Elmina Hasan	mezzo-soprano	Azerbaijan
2024, Mumbai	Zarzuela Prize	Angel Romero	tenor	United States
2024, Mumbai	CulturArte Prize	Eliza Boom	soprano	New Zealand
2024, Mumbai	Birgit Nilsson Prize	Kathleen O’Mara	soprano	United States
2024, Mumbai	Birgit Nilsson Prize	Le Bu	bass	China
2024, Mumbai	Audience Prize	Elmina Hasan	mezzo-soprano	Azerbaijan
2024, Mumbai	Audience Prize	Jack Lee	baritone	United Kingdom
2023, Cape Town	1st Prize	Julie Roset	soprano	France
2023, Cape Town	1st Prize	Stephano Park	bass	South Korea
2023, Cape Town	2nd Prize	Eugénie Joneau	mezzo-soprano	France
2023, Cape Town	2nd Prize	Luke Sutliff	baritone	United States
2023, Cape Town	3rd Prize	Elena Villalón	soprano	United States
2023, Cape Town	3rd Prize	Navasard Hakobyan	baritone	Armenia
2023, Cape Town	Zarzuela Prize	Eugénie Joneau	mezzo-soprano	France
2023, Cape Town	Zarzuela Prize	Navasard Hakobyan	baritone	Armenia
2023, Cape Town	CulturArte Prize	Nombulelo Yende	soprano	South Africa
2023, Cape Town	Birgit Nilsson Prize	Eugénie Joneau	mezzo-soprano	France
2023, Cape Town	Audience Prize	Elena Villalón	soprano	United States
2023, Cape Town	Audience Prize	Taehan Kim	baritone	South Korea
2022, Riga	1st Prize	Juliana Grigoryan	soprano	Armenia
2022, Riga	1st Prize	Anthony León	tenor	United States
2022, Riga	2nd Prize	Serena Sáenz	soprano	Spain
2022, Riga	2nd Prize	Duke Kim	tenor	United States
2022, Riga	2nd Prize	Nils Wanderer	countertenor	Germany
2022, Riga	3rd Prize	Maire Therese Carmack	mezzo-soprano	United States
2022, Riga	3rd Prize	Youngjun Park	baritone	South Korea
2022, Riga	3rd Prize	Jongwon Han	bass-baritone	South Korea
2022, Riga	Zarzuela Prize	Serena Sáenz	soprano	Spain
2022, Riga	Zarzuela Prize	Anthony León	tenor	United States
2022, Riga	CulturArte Prize	Anthony Ciaramitaro	tenor	United States
2022, Riga	Birgit Nilsson Prize	Serena Sáenz	soprano	Spain
2022, Riga	Audience Prize	Juliana Grigoryan	soprano	Armenia
2022, Riga	Audience Prize	Youngjun Park	baritone	South Korea
2021, Moscow	1st Prize	Victoria Karkacheva	mezzo-soprano	Russia
2021, Moscow	1st Prize	Iván Ayón-Rivas	tenor	Peru
2021, Moscow	2nd Prize	Mané Galoyan	soprano	Armenia
2021, Moscow	2nd Prize	Bekhzod Davronov	tenor	Uzbekistan
2021, Moscow	2nd Prize	Jonah Hoskins	tenor	United States
2021, Moscow	3rd Prize	Emily Pogorelc	soprano	United States
2021, Moscow	3rd Prize	Dmitry Cheblykov	baritone	Russia
2021, Moscow	3rd Prize	Jusung Gabriel Park	bass-baritone	South Korea
2021, Moscow	Zarzuela Prize	Mané Galoyan	soprano	Armenia
2021, Moscow	Zarzuela Prize	Iván Ayón-Rivas	tenor	Peru
2021, Moscow	CulturArte Prize	Ekaterina Sannikova	soprano	Russia
2021, Moscow	Birgit Nilsson Prize	Victoria Karkacheva	mezzo-soprano	Russia
2021, Moscow	Audience Prize	Mané Galoyan	soprano	Armenia
2021, Moscow	Audience Prize	Iván Ayón-Rivas	tenor	Peru
2019, Prague	1st Prize	Adriana González	soprano	Guatemala
2019, Prague	1st Prize	Xabier Anduaga	tenor	Spain
2019, Prague	2nd Prize	Maria Kataeva	mezzo-soprano	Russia
2019, Prague	2nd Prize	Gihoon Kim	baritone	South Korea
2019, Prague	3rd Prize	Christina Nilsson	soprano	Sweden
2019, Prague	3rd Prize	Aryeh Nussbaum Cohen	countertenor	United States / Germany
2019, Prague	Zarzuela Prize	Adriana Gonzalez	soprano	Guatemala
2019, Prague	Zarzuela Prize	Xabier Anduaga	tenor	Spain
2019, Prague	CulturArte Prize	Anna Shapovalova	soprano	Russia
2019, Prague	Birgit Nilsson Prize	Felicia Moore	soprano	United States
2019, Prague	Birgit Nilsson Prize	Christina Nilsson	soprano	Sweden
2019, Prague	Audience Prize	Maria Kataeva	mezzo-soprano	Russia
2019, Prague	Audience Prize	Gihoon Kim	baritone	South Korea
2018, Lisbon	1st Prize	Emily D'Angelo	mezzo-soprano	Canada / Italy
2018, Lisbon	1st Prize	Pavel Petrov	tenor	Belarus
2018, Lisbon	2nd Prize	Migran Agadzhanyan	tenor	Russia
2018, Lisbon	2nd Prize	Samantha Hankey	mezzo-soprano	United States
2018, Lisbon	3rd Prize	Arseny Yakovlev	tenor	Russia
2018, Lisbon	3rd Prize	Rihab Chaieb	mezzo-soprano	Canada
2018, Lisbon	Zarzuela Prize	Emily D'Angelo	mezzo-soprano	Canada / Italy
2018, Lisbon	Zarzuela Prize	Pavel Petrov	tenor	Belarus
2018, Lisbon	Zarzuela Prize	Luis Gomes	tenor	Portugal
2018, Lisbon	CulturArte Prize	Josy Santos	mezzo-soprano	Brazil
2018, Lisbon	Birgit Nilsson Prize	Emily D'Angelo	mezzo-soprano	Canada / Italy
2018, Lisbon	Birgit Nilsson Prize	Samantha Hankey	mezzo-soprano	United States
2018, Lisbon	Audience Prize	Luis Gomes	tenor	Portugal
2018, Lisbon	Audience Prize	Emily D'Angelo	mezzo-soprano	Canada / Italy
2017, Astana	1st Prize	Levy Sekgapane	tenor	South Africa
2017, Astana	1st Prize	Adela Zaharia	soprano	Romania
2017, Astana	2nd Prize	Kristina Mkhitaryan	soprano	Russia
2017, Astana	2nd Prize	Davide Giusti	tenor	Italy
2017, Astana	3rd Prize	Maria Mudryak	soprano	Kazakhstan
2017, Astana	3rd Prize	Leon Kim	baritone	South Korea
2017, Astana	Zarzuela Prize	Marco Ciaponi	tenor	Italy
2017, Astana	Zarzuela Prize	Adela Zaharia	soprano	Romania
2017, Astana	CulturArte Prize	Sooyeon Lee	soprano	South Korea
2017, Astana	Birgit Nilsson Prize	Oksana Sekerina	soprano	Russia
2017, Astana	Birgit Nilsson Prize	Boris Prýgl	bass-baritone	Czech Republic
2017, Astana	Audience Prize	Maria Mudryak	soprano	Kazakhstan
2017, Astana	Audience Prize	Leon Kim	baritone	South Korea
2016, Guadalajara	1st Prize	Elsa Dreisig	soprano	France
2016, Guadalajara	1st Prize	Konu Kim	tenor	South Korea
2016, Guadalajara	2nd Prize	Bogdan Volkov	tenor	Russia
2016, Guadalajara	2nd Prize	Marina Costa-Jackson	soprano	United States/Italy
2016, Guadalajara	3rd Prize	Olga Kulchynska	soprano	Ukraine
2016, Guadalajara	3rd Prize	Rame Lahaj	tenor	Kosovo
2016, Guadalajara	Zarzuela Prize	Marina Costa-Jackson	soprano	United States/Italy
2016, Guadalajara	Zarzuela Prize	Juan Carlos Heredia	baritone	Mexico
2016, Guadalajara	Zarzuela Prize	Nicholas Brownlee	bass-baritone	United States
2016, Guadalajara	CulturArte Prize	Elena Stikhina	soprano	Russia
2016, Guadalajara	Birgit Nilsson Prize	Brenton Ryan	tenor	United States
2016, Guadalajara	Audience Prize	Elena Stikhina	soprano	Russia
2016, Guadalajara	Audience Prize	Konu Kim	tenor	South Korea
2015, London	1st Prize	Lise Davidsen	soprano	Norway
2015, London	1st Prize	Ioan Hotea	tenor	Romania
2015, London	2nd Prize	Darren Pene Pati	tenor	New Zealand
2015, London	2nd Prize	Hera Hyesang Park	soprano	South Korea
2015, London	3rd Prize	Edward Parks	baritone	United States
2015, London	3rd Prize	Noluvuyiso Mpofu	soprano	South Africa
2015, London	Zarzuela Prize	Hera Hyesang Park	soprano	South Korea
2015, London	Zarzuela Prize	Ioan Hotea	tenor	Romania
2015, London	CulturArte Prize	Kiandra Howarth	soprano	Australia
2015, London	Birgit Nilsson Prize	Brian Rex Fernandez	Countertenor	Philippines
2015, London	Audience Prize	Lise Davidsen	soprano	Norway
2015, London	Audience Prize	Darren Pene Pati	tenor	New Zealand
2014, Los Angeles	1st Prize	Rachel Willis-Sørensen	soprano	United States
2014, Los Angeles	1st Prize	Mario Chang	tenor	Guatemala
2014, Los Angeles	2nd Prize	Amanda Woodbury	soprano	United States
2014, Los Angeles	2nd Prize	Joshua Guerrero	tenor	United States/Mexico
2014, Los Angeles	3rd Prize	Andrey Nemzer	countertenor	Russia
2014, Los Angeles	3rd Prize	Mariangela Sicilia	soprano	Italy
2014, Los Angeles	3rd Prize	John Holiday	countertenor	United States
2014, Los Angeles	3rd Prize	Anaïs Constans	soprano	France
2014, Los Angeles	Zarzuela Prize	Rachel Willis-Sørensen	soprano	United States
2014, Los Angeles	Zarzuela Prize	Mario Chang	tenor	Guatemala
2014, Los Angeles	CulturArte Prize	Joshua Guerrero	tenor	United States/Mexico
2014, Los Angeles	Birgit Nilsson Prize	Rachel Willis-Sørensen	soprano	United States
2014, Los Angeles	Audience Prize	Amanda Woodbury	soprano	United States
2014, Los Angeles	Audience Prize	Mario Chang	tenor	Guatemala
2013, Verona	1st Prize	Ao Li	bass-baritone	China
2013, Verona	1st Prize	Aida Garifullina	soprano	Russia
2013, Verona	2nd Prize	Julie Fuchs	soprano	France
2013, Verona	2nd Prize	Simone Piazzola	baritone	Italy
2013, Verona	3rd Prize	Kathryn Lewek	soprano	United States
2013, Verona	3rd Prize	Zach Borichevsky	tenor	United States
2013, Verona	Zarzuela Prize	Hae Ji Chang	soprano	South Korea
2013, Verona	Zarzuela Prize	Benjamin Bliss	tenor	United States
2013, Verona	CulturArte Prize	Vladimir Dmitruk	tenor	Belarus
2013, Verona	Birgit Nilsson Prize	Claudia Huckle	contralto	United Kingdom
2013, Verona	Birgit Nilsson Prize	Tracy Cox	soprano	United States
2013, Verona	Audience Price	Simone Piazzola	baritone	Italy
2013, Verona	Audience Price	Kathryn Lewek	soprano	United States
2012, Beijing	1st Prize	Anthony Roth Costanzo	countertenor	United States
2012, Beijing	1st Prize	Enkhbatyn Amartüvshin	baritone	Mongolia
2012, Beijing	1st Prize	Janai Brugger	soprano	United States
2012, Beijing	2nd Prize	Guanqun Yu	soprano	United States
2012, Beijing	2nd Prize	Brian Jagde	tenor	United States
2012, Beijing	2nd Prize	Yunpeng Wang	baritone	China
2012, Beijing	3rd Prize	Nadezhda Karyazina	mezzo-soprano	Russia
2012, Beijing	3rd Prize	Roman Burdenko	baritone	Russia
2012, Beijing	Zarzuela Prize	Janai Brugger	soprano	United States
2012, Beijing	Zarzuela Prize	Yunpeng Wang	baritone	China
2012, Beijing	CulturArte Prize	Antonio Poli	tenor	Italy
2012, Beijing	Birgit Nilsson Prize	Brian Jagde	tenor	United States
2012, Beijing	Audience Prize	Janai Brugger	soprano	United States
2012, Beijing	Audience Prize	Yunpeng Wang	baritone	China
2011, Moscow	1st Prize	Pretty Yende	soprano	South Africa
2011, Moscow	1st Prize	René Barbera	tenor	United States
2011, Moscow	2nd Prize	Olga Busuioc	soprano	Moldova
2011, Moscow	2nd Prize	Konstantin Shushakov	baritone	Russia
2011, Moscow	3rd Prize	Olga Pudova	soprano	Russia
2011, Moscow	3rd Prize	Jaesig Lee	tenor	South Korea
2011, Moscow	Zarzuela Prize	Pretty Yende	soprano	South Africa
2011, Moscow	Zarzuela Prize	Olga Busuioc	soprano	Moldova
2011, Moscow	Zarzuela Prize	René Barbera	tenor	United States
2011, Moscow	CulturArte Prize	Javier Arrey	baritone	Chile
2011, Moscow	Birgit Nilsson Prize	Jongmin Park	bass	South Korea
2011, Moscow	Audience Prize	Pretty Yende	soprano	South Africa
2011, Moscow	Audience Prize	René Barbera	tenor	United States
2010, Milan	1st Prize	Sonya Yoncheva	soprano	Bulgaria
2010, Milan	1st Prize	Ștefan Pop	tenor	Romania
2010, Milan	2nd Prize	Rosa Feola	soprano	Italy
2010, Milan	2nd Prize	Giordano Lucà	tenor	Italy
2010, Milan	2nd Prize	Ievgen Orlov	bass	Ukraine
2010, Milan	3rd Prize	Dinara Aliyeva	soprano	Azerbaijan
2010, Milan	3rd Prize	Chae Jun Lim	bass	South Korea
2010, Milan	Zarzuela Prize	Nathaniel Peake	tenor	United States
2010, Milan	Zarzuela Prize	Rosa Feola	soprano	Italy
2010, Milan	CulturArte Prize	Sonya Yoncheva	soprano	Bulgaria
2010, Milan	Birgit Nilsson Prize	Ryan McKinny	bass-baritone	United States
2010, Milan	Audience Prize	Rosa Feola	soprano	Italy
2010, Milan	Audience Prize	Ștefan Pop	tenor	Romania
2009, Pécs/Budapest	1st Prize	Julia Novikova	soprano	Russia
2009, Pécs/Budapest	1st Prize	Alexey Kudrya	tenor	Russia
2009, Pécs/Budapest	2nd Prize	Angel Blue	soprano	United States
2009, Pécs/Budapest	2nd Prize	Jordan Bisch	bass	United States
2009, Pécs/Budapest	2nd Prize	Dimitrios Flemotomos	tenor	Greece
2009, Pécs/Budapest	3rd Prize	Kostas Smoriginas	bass-baritone	Lithuania
2009, Pécs/Budapest	3rd Prize	Auxiliadora Toledano	soprano	Spain
2009, Pécs/Budapest	3rd Prize	Anita Watson	soprano	Australia
2009, Pécs/Budapest	3rd Prize	Wenwei Zhang	bass	China
2009, Pécs/Budapest	Zarzuela Prize	Angel Blue	soprano	United States
2009, Pécs/Budapest	Zarzuela Prize	Dimitrios Flemotomos	tenor	Greece
2009, Pécs/Budapest	CulturArte Prize	Arnold Rutkowski	tenor	Poland
2009, Pécs/Budapest	Audience Prize	Dimitrios Flemotomos	tenor	Greece
2009, Pécs/Budapest	Audience Prize	Julia Novikova	soprano	Russia
2009, Pécs/Budapest	Special Prize	Alexey Kudrya	tenor	Russia
2009, Pécs/Budapest	Special Prize	Kostas Smoriginas	bass-baritone	Lithuania
2009, Pécs/Budapest	Special Prize	Auxiliadora Toledano	soprano	Spain
2008, Quebec City	1st Prize	María Alejandres Katzarava	soprano	Mexico
2008, Quebec City	1st Prize	Joel Prieto	tenor	Spain / Puerto Rico
2008, Quebec City	2nd Prize	Thiago Arancam	tenor	Brazil
2008, Quebec City	2nd Prize	Oksana Kramaryeva	soprano	Ukraine
2008, Quebec City	3rd Prize	Elena Xanthoudakis	soprano	Greece/Australia
2008, Quebec City	3rd Prize	Károly Szemerédy	baritone	Hungary
2008, Quebec City	Zarzuela Prize	Ketevan Kemoklidze	mezzo-soprano	Georgia
2008, Quebec City	Zarzuela Prize	María Alejandres Katzarava	soprano	Mexico
2008, Quebec City	Zarzuela Prize	Joel Prieto	tenor	Spain / Puerto Rico
2008, Quebec City	Zarzuela Prize	Thiago Arancam	tenor	Brazil
2008, Quebec City	CulturArte Prize	Joel Prieto	tenor	Spain / Puerto Rico
2008, Quebec City	Audience Prize	Thiago Arancam	tenor	Brazil
2008, Quebec City	Audience Prize	Oksana Kramaryeva	soprano	Ukraine
2007, Paris	1st Prize	Ekaterina Lekhina	soprano	Russia
2007, Paris	1st Prize	Tae Joong Yang	baritone	South Korea
2007, Paris	2nd Prize	Olga Peretyatko	soprano	Russia
2007, Paris	2nd Prize	David Bižić	baritone	Serbia
2007, Paris	2nd Prize	Dmytro Popov	tenor	Ukraine
2007, Paris	3rd Prize	Marco Caria	baritone	Italy
2007, Paris	3rd Prize	Lisette Oropesa	soprano	United States
2007, Paris	Zarzuela Prize	Rachele Gilmore	soprano	United States
2007, Paris	Zarzuela Prize	Carine Sechehaye	mezzo-soprano	Switzerland
2007, Paris	Zarzuela Prize	Aurelio Gabaldon	tenor	Spain
2007, Paris	Zarzuela Prize	Lisette Oropesa	soprano	United States
2007, Paris	CulturArte Prize	Carmen Solis Gonzalez	soprano	Spain
2007, Paris	Audience Prize	Marco Caria	baritone	Italy
2007, Paris	Orchestra Prize	Dmytro Popov	tenor	Ukraine
2006, Valencia	1st Prize	Maija Kovaļevska	soprano	Latvia
2006, Valencia	1st Prize	David Lomeli	tenor	Mexico
2006, Valencia	2nd Prize	Ailyn Pérez	soprano	United States
2006, Valencia	2nd Prize	Sébastien Guèze	tenor	France
2006, Valencia	3rd Prize	Maria Teresa Alberola Banuls	soprano	Spain
2006, Valencia	3rd Prize	Trevor Scheunemann	baritone	United States
2006, Valencia	Zarzuela Prize	David Lomeli	tenor	Mexico
2006, Valencia	Zarzuela Prize	Maria Teresa Alberola Banuls	soprano	Spain
2006, Valencia	CulturArte Prize	Karen Vuong	soprano	United States
2006, Valencia	Audience Prize	Sébastien Guèze	tenor	France
2006, Valencia	Audience Prize	Maria Teresa Alberola Banuls	soprano	Spain
2005, Madrid	1st Prize	Susanna Phillips	soprano	United States
2005, Madrid	1st Prize	Vasily Ladyuk	baritone	Russia
2005, Madrid	2nd Prize	Joseph Kaiser	tenor	Canada
2005, Madrid	2nd Prize	Diógenes Randes	bass	Brazil
2005, Madrid	3rd Prize	David Menendez Diaz	baritone	Spain
2005, Madrid	3rd Prize	Joshua Langston Hopkins	baritone	Canada
2005, Madrid	Zarzuela Prize	Arturo Chacón Cruz	tenor	Mexico
2005, Madrid	Zarzuela Prize	Kinga Dobay	mezzo-soprano	Germany
2005, Madrid	CulturArte Prize	Arturo Chacón Cruz	tenor	Mexico
2005, Madrid	Audience Prize	Susanna Phillips	soprano	United States
2004, Los Angeles	1st Prize	Woo Kyung Kim	tenor	South Korea
2004, Los Angeles	2nd Prize	Nataliya Kovalova	soprano	Ukraine
2004, Los Angeles	3rd Prize	Dmitry Voropaev	tenor	Russia
2004, Los Angeles	4th Prize	Mikhail Petrenko	bass	Russia
2004, Los Angeles	4th Prize	Maria Jooste	soprano	South Africa
2004, Los Angeles	4th Prize	Vitaly Bilyy	baritone	Ukraine
2004, Los Angeles	4th Prize	Dmitry Korchak	tenor	Russia
2004, Los Angeles	Zarzuela Prize	Dmitry Korchak	tenor	Russia
2004, Los Angeles	Zarzuela Prize	In-Sung Sim	baritone	South Korea
2004, Los Angeles	CulturArte Prize	Irina Lungu	soprano	Russia
2004, Los Angeles	Audience Prize	Nataliya Kovalova	soprano	Ukraine
2003, Bodensee (St. Gallen, Bregenz, Friedrichshafen, Mainau)	1st Prize	Adriana Damato	soprano	Italy
2003, Bodensee (St. Gallen, Bregenz, Friedrichshafen, Mainau)	2nd Prize	Jozef Gjipali (Giuseppe Gipali)	tenor	Albania
2003, Bodensee (St. Gallen, Bregenz, Friedrichshafen, Mainau)	3rd Prize	Israel Lozano	tenor	Spain
2003, Bodensee (St. Gallen, Bregenz, Friedrichshafen, Mainau)	3rd Prize	Jesus Garcia	tenor	United States
2003, Bodensee (St. Gallen, Bregenz, Friedrichshafen, Mainau)	Zarzuela Prize	Sabina Puértolas	soprano	Spain
2003, Bodensee (St. Gallen, Bregenz, Friedrichshafen, Mainau)	Zarzuela Prize	Jennifer Check	soprano	United States
2003, Bodensee (St. Gallen, Bregenz, Friedrichshafen, Mainau)	Zarzuela Prize	Mario Cassi	baritone	Italy
2003, Bodensee (St. Gallen, Bregenz, Friedrichshafen, Mainau)	Zarzuela Prize	Israel Lozano	tenor	Spain
2003, Bodensee (St. Gallen, Bregenz, Friedrichshafen, Mainau)	Audience Prize	Israel Lozano	tenor	Spain
2002, Paris	1st Prize	Carmen Giannattasio	soprano	Italy
2002, Paris	1st Prize	Elena Manistina	mezzo-soprano	Russia
2002, Paris	2nd Prize	Stéphane Degout	baritone	France
2002, Paris	2nd Prize	John Matz	tenor	United States
2002, Paris	3rd Prize	Maria Fontosh	soprano	Russia
2002, Paris	Zarzuela Prize	Anna Kiknadze	mezzo-soprano	Georgia
2002, Paris	Zarzuela Prize	Jae Hyoung Kim	tenor	South Korea
2002, Paris	Zarzuela Prize	John Matz	tenor	United States
2002, Paris	CulturArte Prize	Kate Aldrich	mezzo-soprano	United States
2002, Paris	Audience Prize	Carmen Giannattasio	soprano	Italy
2001, Washington, D.C.	1st Prize	Guang Yang	mezzo-soprano	China
2001, Washington, D.C.	2nd Prize	Alessandra Rezza	soprano	Italy
2001, Washington, D.C.	2nd Prize	Hyoung-Kyoo Kang	baritone	South Korea
2001, Washington, D.C.	3rd Prize	Maya Dashuk	soprano	Russia
2001, Washington, D.C.	Zarzuela Prize	Valeriano Lanchas	bass	Colombia
2001, Washington, D.C.	Zarzuela Prize	Jossie Perez	mezzo-soprano	United States
2001, Washington, D.C.	Zarzuela Prize	Antonio Gandia	tenor	Spain
2001, Washington, D.C.	Zarzuela Prize	Eugenia Garza	soprano	Mexico
2001, Washington, D.C.	CulturArte Prize	Lasha Nikabadze	tenor	Georgia
2001, Washington, D.C.	Audience Prize	Elisaveta Martirosyan	soprano	Georgia
2000, Los Angeles	1st Prize	Isabel Bayrakdarian	soprano	Canada
2000, Los Angeles	2nd Prize	He Hui	soprano	China
2000, Los Angeles	2nd Prize	Daniil Shtoda	tenor	Russia
2000, Los Angeles	3rd Prize	Robert Pomakov	bass	Canada
2000, Los Angeles	3rd Prize	Konstyantyn Andreyev	tenor	Ukraine
2000, Los Angeles	Zarzuela Prize	Arnold Kocharyan	baritone	Armenia
2000, Los Angeles	Zarzuela Prize	Isabel Bayrakdarian	soprano	Canada
2000, Los Angeles	Zarzuela Prize	Andrei Breous	baritone	Russia
2000, Los Angeles	Zarzuela Prize	Virginia Tola	soprano	Argentina
2000, Los Angeles	Zarzuela Prize	Konstyantyn Andreyev	tenor	Ukraine
2000, Los Angeles	Audience Prize	Virginia Tola	soprano	Argentina
2000, Los Angeles	Special prize	Virginia Tola	soprano	Argentina
1999, San Juan	1st Prize	Orlin Anastassov	bass	Bulgaria
1999, San Juan	2nd Prize	Rolando Villazón	tenor	Mexico
1999, San Juan	2nd Prize	Giuseppe Filianoti	tenor	Italy
1999, San Juan	3rd Prize	Yali-Marie Williams	soprano	Puerto Rico
1999, San Juan	Zarzuela Prize	Mariola Cantarero	soprano	Spain
1999, San Juan	Zarzuela Prize	Rolando Villazón	tenor	Mexico
1999, San Juan	CulturArte Prize	Vitalij Kowaljow	bass	Ukraine
1999, San Juan	CulturArte Prize	Joseph Calleja	tenor	Malta
1999, San Juan	Audience Prize	Rolando Villazón	tenor	Mexico
1998, Hamburg	1st Prize	Erwin Schrott	bass	Uruguay
1998, Hamburg	2nd Prize	Ludovic Tézier	baritone	France
1998, Hamburg	2nd Prize	Joyce DiDonato	mezzo-soprano	United States
1998, Hamburg	3rd Prize	Maki Mori	soprano	Japan
1998, Hamburg	Zarzuela Prize	Andión Fernández	soprano	Philippines
1998, Hamburg	Zarzuela Prize	Carlos Cosías	tenor	Spain
1998, Hamburg	CulturArte Prize	Bae Jae-chul	tenor	South Korea
1998, Hamburg	Audience Prize	Erwin Schrott	bass	Uruguay
1997, Tokyo	1st Prize	Chang Yong Liao	baritone	China
1997, Tokyo	1st Prize	Carla Maria Izzo	soprano	Italy
1997, Tokyo	2nd Prize	Jung-Hack Seo	baritone	South Korea
1997, Tokyo	2nd Prize	Aquiles Machado	tenor	Venezuela
1997, Tokyo	3rd Prize	Xiu Wei Sun	soprano	China
1997, Tokyo	Zarzuela Prize	Angel Rodriguez Rivero	tenor	Spain
1997, Tokyo	Zarzuela Prize	Aquiles Machado	tenor	Venezuela
1997, Tokyo	Audience Prize	Carla Maria Izzo	baritone	Italy
1996, Bordeaux	1st Prize	John Osborn	tenor	United States
1996, Bordeaux	1st Prize	Lynette Tapia	soprano	United States
1996, Bordeaux	2nd Prize	Phyllis Pancella	mezzo-soprano	United States
1996, Bordeaux	2nd Prize	Eric Owens	bass	United States
1996, Bordeaux	3rd Prize	Vittorio Vitelli	baritone	Italy
1996, Bordeaux	3rd Prize	Carlos Moreno	tenor	Spain
1996, Bordeaux	Zarzuela Prize	Nancy Fabiola Herrera	mezzo-soprano	Spain
1996, Bordeaux	Zarzuela Prize	Oziel Garza-Ornelas	baritone	Mexico
1996, Bordeaux	Audience Prize	Lynette Tapia	soprano	United States
1995, Madrid	1st Prize	Miguel Angel Zapatero	bass	Spain
1995, Madrid	1st Prize	Sung Eun Kim	soprano	South Korea
1995, Madrid	2nd Prize	Elizabeth Futral	soprano	United States
1995, Madrid	2nd Prize	Dīmītra Theodosiou	soprano	Greece
1995, Madrid	3rd Prize	Carmen Oprisanu	mezzo-soprano	Romania
1995, Madrid	Zarzuela Prize	Ana María Martínez	soprano	Puerto Rico
1995, Madrid	Zarzuela Prize	Rafael Rojas	tenor	Mexico
1995, Madrid	Audience Prize	Dimitra Theodossiou	soprano	Greece
1994, Mexico City	Winner	Brian Asawa	countertenor	United States
1994, Mexico City	Winner	José Cura	tenor	Argentina
1994, Mexico City	Winner	Bruce Fowler	tenor	United States
1994, Mexico City	Winner	Simone Alberghini	bass	Italy
1994, Mexico City	Winner	María Cecilia Díaz	mezzo-soprano	Argentina
1994, Mexico City	Winner	Masako Teshima	mezzo-soprano	Japan
1994, Mexico City	Winner	Oxana Arkaeva	soprano	Ukraine
1994, Mexico City	Audience Prize	José Cura	tenor	Argentina
1993, Paris	Winner	Ainhoa Arteta	soprano	Span
1993, Paris	Winner	Inva Mula	soprano	Albania
1993, Paris	Winner	Nina Stemme	mezzo-soprano	Sweden
1993, Paris	Winner	Kwangchul Youn	bass	South Korea
1993, Paris	Audience Prize	Ainhoa Arteta	soprano	Spain

== See also ==
- List of classical music competitions
