= Rafael Rojas =

Rafael Rojas may refer to:

- Rafael Rojas (actor)
- Rafael Rojas (tenor)
