= Maria Katzarava =

Mexican opera singer

María Katzarava
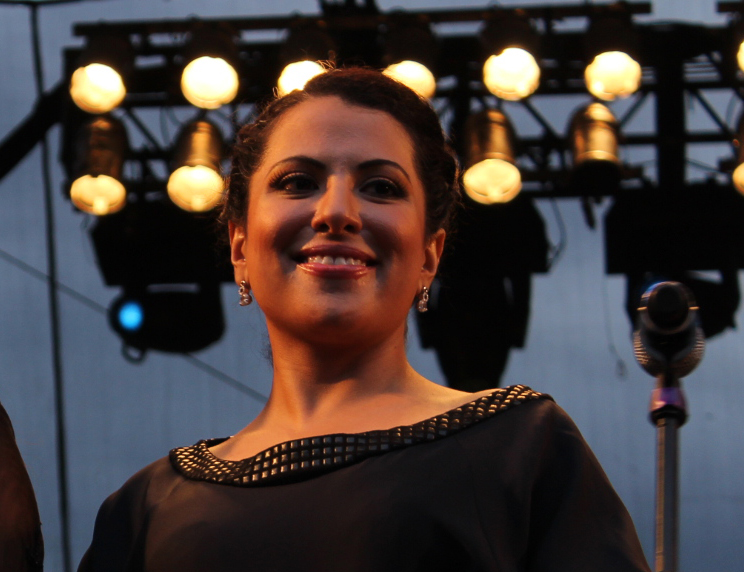
- Born: María Alejandra Katzarava Hernández; 1984; Mexico City
- Occupation: Operatic soprano
- Years active: 2002–present
- Website: mariakatzarava.com

Maria Katzarava (born 1984) is an opera singer from Mexico who achieved international fame by winning first place in the Operalia competition in the opera and zarzuela categories. Prior to this, she came to the attention of notable Mexican tenor Ramón Vargas, who helped her get a scholarship, and then won Mexico's Carlo Morelli national singing competition in 2005, which earned her a debut at the Palacio de Bellas Artes. Since winning the Operalia competition, Katzarava has performed in Europe, where she currently lives, Asia and the Americas. She currently trains with soprano Mirella Freni.

== Life ==
Born and raised in Mexico City, Katzarava's full name is María Alejandra Katzarava Hernández. She comes from a family of musicians and doctors, the granddaughter of a professional baritone and the daughter of professional violinists. Her father, Archil Katzarava, is from Georgia and her mother, Velia Hernández, Mexican. While pregnant with Maria, her mother attended all the concerts of Mexico's national orchestra, Orquesta Sinfónica Nacional, of which she was a violinist along with her husband.

At age three, her father began to teach her to play the violin, and later she began to learn piano along with her older sister Lela. At age eight she had her first concert as a violinist with the Orquestra Juvenil de la Escuela Nacional de Música. Katzarava continued to study the violin for 20 years, but in 2013, gave up the instrument because of the demands of her singing career, as she played only for her own pleasure. She continues to play the piano as part of her singing practice.

In her childhood and adolescence she did not have many friends, as her violin studies and her studies at the Liceo Franco Mexicano school took up all of her time. Katzarava states that this prepared her for later life on the road. She says that she has been very sure of herself since she was a child and never thinks about failure when she is on the stage. She learned to overcome stagefright with her first rehearsal thinking of a stage appearance as a party.

Despite the time spent in her childhood in music, Katzarava wanted to be a doctor growing up and began to prepare herself for this career in high school, but that changed when she began to study singing. She had always liked to sing as a child and one of her idols was singer Ana Torroja of the pop group Mecano. Her interest in operatic singing was initially sparked by seeing her first opera, La bohème, at age 12, after which she asked her mother for singing lessons. However, she had to wait three years for her voice to mature, and age at 15 began studying under Veracruz soprano Rosario Andrade. She maintained her interest during these three years because she felt she could not express herself sufficiently with the violin, she was intrigued by the development of her own voice and opera attracted her because of the acting component. When she sang her first aria, she fell in love with the “gymnastics” of it. At age 17, she began to study with Maritza Alemán at the Escuela Superior de Música and later with baritone Gabriel Mijares and American maestro James Demster.

Her parents have been supportive of her career, which has taken her out of Mexico to live since 2008. She currently lives in Barcelona.

Katzarava spends most of her time traveling, but she does not complain as her career allows her to visit many countries. In addition to Spanish, she speaks Georgian, English, French, Italian and Russian. During the off-season she likes to travel, go to the theater, see her friends and family and likes just to spend time at home. She also likes to camp, mountain bike, swim and go to the gym.

She originally performed under the name of María Alejandres but returned to her real last name in 2014.

== Career ==
Katzarava first major recognition of her talent was being named Revelación Juvenil at the Carlo Morelli National Singing Competition in 2002. In 2004, she debuted with the opera La Serva Padrona with the Chihuahua Symphony Orchestra and with the Oaxaca Chamber Orchestra. That same year, she placed first at the Maritza Alemán Competition and was a finalist at the Francisco Viñas International Competition.

Her first major break also came in 2004, when she was granted an audition organized by magazine Pro Ópera. There her voice sufficiently impressed tenor Ramón Vargas to not only offer a scholarship, but an offer to mentor her himself.

In 2005 Katzarava returned to the Carlo Morelli competition, the most important singing competition in Mexico. This time, she placed first, which earned her the opportunity to have her debut at age 21 at the Palacio de Bellas Artes in Mexico City, performing as Stephano in Romeo and Juliet with established artists Anna Netrebko and Rolando Villazón. She later returned to Bellas Artes for its 80th anniversary celebration.

Her first international break came in 2007, when Plácido Domingo heard her at a gala in Acapulco and invited her to audition in Los Angeles. In 2008, she was accepted as a resident into the Domingo-Thorton Young Artist Program of the Los Angeles Opera, to study and work with Gabriel Mijares and Luisa Besrokova.

This was followed by her participation in the 2008 Operalia competition in Canada, where she won first place in the opera and operetta category, competing against 1,000 other participants from 200 countries. She became only the third Mexican to win this competition along with tenor Rolando Villazón and Arturo Chacón Cruz, and it brought her international attention and standing.

Other awards that Katzarava has earned include the Carlo Bergonzi Prize, the Francisco Viñas international competition, the Oscar Della Lirica at the Arena di Verona in 2012, and she was named best singer by the Miami Life Awards.

Katzarava has performed in Europe, Asia and the Americas. In 2009, she debuted in Europe performing the role of Juliet in France. Since then she was performed in various Italian venues, such as the Teatro dell'Opera di Roma, the Genoa Theater and is one of the few Mexican singers to have appeared at La Scala in Milan. She has performed at Royal Opera House in London, and in 2013, she made the Teatro Alla Scala Tournée in Verdi's Rigoletto. She made her debut at Teatro Manzoni, Bologna under baton of Michele Mariotti singing " Vier letzte Lieder " which had a huge success. Katzarava frequently performs in her native Mexico, as she states that she needs to come home regularly. Here she has performed with Orquestra Sinfónica de Minería in Morelia, the Palacio de Bellas Artes, the National Autonomous University of Mexico, the Festival Cultural de Zacatecas and has appeared at the Festival Internacional Cervantino on various occasions since 2007.

Later on, Maria Katzarava sang the first Violetta of her career at the Grand Théâtre de Genève in 2013, for which she earned critical acclaim. In the spring of 2013 she returned to the Florida Grand Opera for their production of La traviata. During the 2012/13 season Katzarava also made her debut at the Teatro Petruzzelli in Bari as Isabella in Daniel Auber's rarely performed piece La muette de Portici. In July 2013 she debuted at the Teatro Lirico di Cagliari singing her first Suzel in Mascagni's L'amico Fritz. She also joined the Teatro alla Scala on their tour to Japan where she sang Gilda in Verdi's Rigoletto.

Engagements for the 2013/2014 season included debuts in roles like Nedda in Leoncavallo's Pagliacci at the Fondazione Sinfonica Petruzzelli in Bari; Manon in Massenet's opera at Palacio de Bellas Artes; Liù in Puccini's Turandot at Teatro Lirico di Cagliari and Mimì in Puccini's La bohème.

== Artistry ==
Katzarava has performed solo, accompanied by pianists, in operas and accompanied by symphony and chamber orchestras such as the Los Angeles Opera company, Orchestra del Teatro Comunale di Bologna, Sinfónica del Teatro Petruzzelli and the Orquestra del Teatro de Bellas Artes among others. She has performed with other singers such as tenor Francisco Araiza. She currently performs with Ramón Vargas, Plácido Domingo, Andrea Bocelli, Rolando Villazón, Piotr Beczala, Leonardo Capalbo among others. She says her main model is soprano Mirella Freni.

In her opinion, because opera must compete with more popular forms of entertainment, singers must break the stereotype of rotund performers and for this reason, she works to maintain her figure as a way to make her work as an artist more appealing. During the Operalia competition in Canada, Opera Canada had this to say about her performance:

Some contestants stood out right from the quarter-finals, such as the young Mexican soprano Maria Katzarava, whose flawless voice was matched by perfect stage presence, musicality and grace.
