= Alexey Kudrya =

Russian operatic lyric tenor (born 1982)

- Born: Alexei Kudrya; 1982 (age 43–44); Soviet Union
- Occupations: Flute player, tenor singer, conductor
- Years active: 2004–present

Alexey Kudrya (born 1982) is a Russian operatic lyric tenor. He began his musical career playing flute.

Noting on his tenor style, Benjamin Ivry in The New York Sun commented: "Russia's Alexey Kudrya, who has won medals in several vocal competitions, has a refined lyric voice ideal for recordings and smaller opera houses." His first engagements in his native Russia took him to the Stanislavsky Theatre in Moscow, also known as Stanislavski and Nemirovich-Danchenko Moscow Academic Music Theatre.

In 2006, he also sang under the baton of Teodor Currentzis in concert performances in Moscow and Novosibirsk to mark the 250th anniversary of Mozart's birth.

CommandOpera said in 2010 that "Alexey Kudrya is the most exciting Russian Tenor on the planet today: his vocal instrument positively ‘weeps’ in the most Italianate fashion."

== Performances and competitions ==
In October 2005, Kudrya received second prize at the international singing competition Neue Stimmen. In 2006, sang at the Galina Vishnevskaya International Opera Artists Competition, receiving second prize.

In 2009, he won first prize, along with Russian soprano Julia Novikova, in the Operalia competition held in Hungary, as well as the special prize offered by the Hungarian State Opera.

From December 2010 to January 2011, he debuted at the Vienna State Opera, playing Almaviva in The Barber of Seville. He played Libenskof in the Opéra national de Bordeaux's production of Il viaggio a Reims by Gioachino Rossini for a week in March 2010. In 2011, he played Arturo at the Grand Théâtre de Genève's production of I puritani by Vincenzo Bellini, with musical director Jesús López Cobos. During the 2011/12 season, he sang with the Bavarian State Opera, playing Ferrando in Così fan tutte and Marzio in Mitridate, re di Ponto.
