= Maija Kovaļevska =

Latvian soprano opera singer (born 1979)

Maija Kovalevska (born 21 September 1979) is a Latvian soprano opera singer. She is a student of Italian soprano Mirella Freni.

Born in Riga, Kovalevska rose to international prominence in 2006 after winning the Operalia singing competition. She made her Metropolitan Opera debut in 2006, starring first as Mimì in Franco Zeffirelli's production of Puccini's La bohème conducted by Plácido Domingo, and later as Euridice in Gluck's Orfeo ed Euridice. She made her Vienna State Opera debut in 2011 as Tatjana in Eugene Onegin, later as Mimì in La bohème, Micaëla in Carmen, Contessa in Le nozze di Figaro, Amelia in Simon Boccanegra and Violetta in La traviata.

In 2011, Kovalevska sang Micaëla in the Royal Opera House's 3D film production (3D Blue-Ray Opus Arte 3D7096) of Bizet's Carmen. Kovalevska made her Australian debut at the Sydney Opera House in 2014/15 as Mimì for Opera Australia.
