= Maki Mori (soprano) =

Maki Mori (森 麻季, born August 19, 1970) is a Japanese soprano.

== Life and career ==
Mori was trained as an opera singer at the Tokyo University of the Arts, the Milan Conservatory, and the University of Music and Theatre Munich. In 1998 she won third prize in Plácido Domingo's Operalia competition with Joyce DiDonato taking second prize and Erwin Schrott placing first. That same year she made her opera debut at the Washington National Opera (WNO) as Blonde in Die Entführung aus dem Serail with Heinz Fricke conducting. In 1999 she alternated in the role of Gilda with Anna Netrebko in the WNO production of Giuseppe Verdi's Rigoletto. She returned to the WNO in 2001; alternating in the role of Olympia with Sumi Jo in the WNO production of The Tales of Hoffmann. The Virginia Gazette stated in its review, "In the area of technical brilliance, soprano Maki Mori as Olympia, the mechanical doll, was stunning. Her virtuoso singing in the stratospheric range and her very mechanical doll-like movements were flawless."

In 2002 Mori performed in concert with The Three Tenors in Japan; performing "Libiamo ne' lieti calici" from La traviata with Luciano Pavarotti, Plácido Domingo, and José Carreras. In January 2003 she portrayed Sophie in Werther at the Los Angeles Opera. The following May she gave a recital at Weill Recital Hall in New York. In September 2003 she returned to the WNO as Adele in Die Fledermaus. In 2007-2008 she portrayed Sophie in Der Rosenkavalier at the Semperoper in Dresden; a production which was filmed and released on DVD.

In 2009 Mori portrayed Almirena in a concert version of Rinaldo that was given at the 2009 Edinburgh Festival, by the Bach Collegium Japan conducted by Masaaki Suzuki. In 2010 she performed at the Teatro Regio, Turin as Musetta in La bohème. In 2012 she performed a recital at the John F. Kennedy Center for the Performing Arts's Terrace Theater which commemorated Japan's 1912 gift of thousands of cherry trees which are planted in the Tidal Basin.

In 2023 Mori was the soprano soloist in Carmina Burana at Royal Albert Hall which was performed for the BBC Proms.
