= Anthony León =

American-born, Cuban and Colombian operatic tenor (born 1997)

- Born: 14 February 1997 (age 29)
- Occupation: Operatic tenor
- Website: anthonyleontenor.com

Anthony León (born 14 February 1997) is an American-born, Cuban and Colombian operatic tenor. He has won prestigious competitions such as the Metropolitan Opera Laffont Competition in 2023 and the Operalia Competition in 2022, where he received both the first prize and the Zarzuela prize.

== Early life and education ==
Growing up in a musical family influenced by opera, he embraced singing late after initially focusing on instruments like piano and saxophone. In high school he joined a choir which rekindled his passion for singing, leading to more serious training. He graduated in Vocal Performance at La Sierra University, where he entered and won numerous competitions such as the Redlands Bowl Young Artist Competition in 2016 and was finalist in the 2018 Palm Springs Opera Guild Vocal Competition. In 2021 he completed his master's degree in music and vocal performance from the New England Conservatory of Music, where he had received the President's Scholarship.

== Career ==
In 2021 he was an Apprentice Artist at Santa Fe Opera and also performed the role of Count Almaviva in Opera Theatre St. Louis' production of The Barber of Seville. In 2021 he received a Career Development Grant from the Sullivan Foundation. In 2022 he was contracted as a member of the Domingo-Colburn-Stein Young Artist Program at the Los Angeles Opera. At the LA Opera he performed minor roles in operas such as Donizetti's Lucia di Lammermoor, Puccini's Tosca and Verdi's Otello. At the LA Opera he also performed the role of Don Ottavio in Mozart's Don Giovanni, which received considerable praise from critics. He was included in OperaWire's "Top 10 Rising Stars of 2022".

In the summer of 2023 he made his debut at both the Festival d'Aix-en-Provence and the Salzburg Festival. In 2024 he was recipient of the Richard Tucker Career Grant.

== Awards ==
- 2022 – First prize and the Zarzuela prize at the Operalia Competition
- 2023 – Winner at the Metropolitan Opera Laffont Competition
