= Carlos Cosías =

Spanish operatic tenor

Carlos Cosías is a Spanish operatic tenor born in Barcelona, Spain.

Cosías studied music and piano at the Conservatori Superior de Música del Liceu in Barcelona. He specialised in singing, studying with Jaume Francisco Puig and Eduard Giménez, and working with his regular accompanist, Marco Evangelisti.

His repertoire includes works such as Verdi's Requiem and La bohème, and leading roles in bel canto operas such as Il giovedi grasso, Don Pasquale, L'elisir d'amore, Anna Bolena and Lucia di Lammermoor, which he performed at the Gran Teatre del Liceu in Barcelona and in Cagliari (Italy). He has also performed in La vida breve, Macbeth, Cançó d'amor i de guerra, Il matrimonio segreto, Gianni Schicchi (Teatro Arriaga, Bilbao), Juana de Arco en la hoguera (Granada Festival), La bohème (Nice and Teatro Campoamor, Oviedo), La traviata (Teatro Gayarre, Pamplona and Gran Teatre del Liceu) and Rigoletto (in Korea). In the sacred music repertoire, he has performed as a soloist in Rossini's Petite Messe Solennelle and Mozart's Coronation Mass.

Amongst his performances in the 2008/2009 season were role debuts as the Duke of Mantua in Rigoletto at the Croatian National Theater, and as Don Ottavio in Don Giovanni at the Teatre de La Farándula in Sabadell.

== Awards ==
- Manuel Ausensi Singing Competition in Barcelona (1998)
- Plácido Domingo-Pepita Embil Prize for the Best Zarzuela Singer at Operalia, The World Opera Competition (1998)
- Second place at the International Competition Francesc Viñas
- The Best Singer of Donizetti and Best Spanish Singer at the International Competition Francesc Viñas
