= Olga Kulchynska =

Ukrainian soprano opera singer

- Ольга Кульчинська
- Born: 12 July 1990 (age 35); Rivne, Rivne Oblast, Ukrainian SSR
- Education: Ukrainian National Tchaikovsky Academy of Music
- Occupation: Operatic soprano
- Website: www.olgakulchynskasoprano.com

Olga Serhiivna Kulchynska (Ольга Сергіївна Кульчинська; born July 12, 1990) is a Ukrainian soprano opera singer.

== Early life ==
Olga Kulchynska was born in Rivne, Rivne Oblast into a family of musicians. Her grandfather, Yaroslav Kulchynskyi, is an Honored Artist of Ukraine and a singer in the Rivne Philharmonic. Her grandmother Hanna was a contralto, her mother Alina is a cellist, and her father Serhiy is a pianist and worked as the artistic director of the Rivne Philharmonic. Both Olga and her sister Khrystyna became involved with music from an early age; Khrystyna is now a cellist.

== Education ==
At the age of five, Kulchynska began studying at a music school, learning piano and singing in the children's choir. She did not enjoy performing as a pianist as much as she enjoyed singing, and by the time she was thirteen, she had begun to dream of singing solo and had already received her first solo singing lessons from her grandfather, who was teaching at the Rivne Institute of Culture.

Kulchynska later entered the Rivne Music School in the theoretical faculty, as there was no vocal faculty. As a third-year student, she then transferred to the R. Glier Kyiv Institute of Music and graduated as a theorist.

She then entered the vocal faculty of the Pyotr Tchaikovsky National Music Academy of Ukraine, studying with Mariia Stefiuk. In 2011, Kulchynska studied with Dmitry Hvorostovsky in a master class held by the National Philharmonic of Ukraine as part of the "Descents to Heaven" festival.

== Career ==
Kulchynska pursued her passion for theater, rather than solely chamber performances, and was accepted to the Youth Program of the Bolshoi Theater in Moscow. After a year of studies with the program, she was designated the third soloist for the part of Marfa in The Tsar's Bride; three days before the first performance, Kulchynska was chosen to sing the premier. She became a full-time soloist for the theater (from 2014 to 2017) and was the first performer to do so after having only one year of studies with the program.

Kulchynska has performed at Opernhaus Zürich, the Gran Teatre del Liceu in Barcelona, Bayerische Staatsoper in Munich, Opera Bastille in Paris, and the Metropolitan Opera in New York, as well as many other notable theaters across Europe.

Her 2024/25 season included her debut at the Salzburger Festspiele, where she also made her role debut as Cleopatra in Giulio Cesare, Susanna at the Metropolitan Opera, her house debut at role debut as Mathilde in Rossini's Wilhelm Tell at Opéra de Lausanne, Mimi in La Bohème at the Royal Ballet and Opera House, and Fiordiligi in Cosi fan Tutte at the Bayerische Staatsoper.

== Awards ==
- 2011 — Grand Prix at the Ivan Alchevsky International Singing Competition in Kharkiv
- 2012 — Third prize at the VI Bulbul International Vocalist Competition
- 2012 — First prize at the Mykola Lysenko International Music Competition in Kyiv
- 2015 — First prize at the Francisco Viñas International Vocal Competition in Barcelona
- 2016 — Third prize at the International Singer Competition "Operalia" Competition in Guadalajara (Mexico)
