= Santo Tomé, Santa Fe =

Santo Tomé
- City
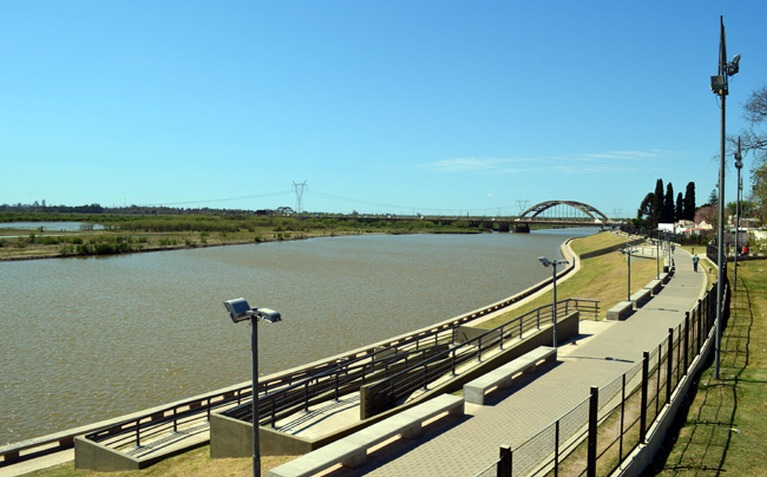

- Location of Santo Tomé in Argentina
- Coordinates: 31°40′S 60°46′W
- Country: Argentina
- Province: Santa Fe
- Department: La Capital

Government
  - Intendant: Miguel Weiss Ackerley (PRO)

Area
  - Total: 79 km^{2} (31 sq mi)
- Elevation: 19 m (62 ft)

Population (2010 census)
  - Total: 65,684
  - Density: 830/km^{2} (2,200/sq mi)
- Demonym: santotomesino
- Time zone: UTC−3 (ART)
- Dialing code: +54 342
- Website: https://www.santotome.gob.ar/

Santo Tomé is a city in the province of Santa Fe, Argentina. It is located only 9 km from the capital city (Santa Fe). It has a population of about 65,684 inhabitants (2010 census [INDEC])and estimated at 80,000 inhabitants based on population growth rate provided by the INDEC, and is classified as a second-category municipality.

== History ==
The town of Santo Tomé was founded in 1872 by the provincial government, and became a city on 12 April 1962.

== Notable people ==
- Virginia Tola, operatic soprano
- Spreen, number one streamer by Argentina and top international
