= Ekaterina Sannikova =

Ukrainian operatic soprano (born 1992)

- Born: 1992 (age 33–34)
- Education: Saint Petersburg Conservatory
- Occupation: Operatic soprano
- Organization: Mariinsky Theatre

Ekaterina Sannikova (Ukrainian: Екатерина Санникова; born 1992) is a Ukrainian operatic soprano who made an international career.

== Life and career ==
Sannikova was born in Ternopil in 1992. She studied voice and acting at the Tver music academy and further at the Saint Petersburg Conservatory with Olga Kondina. She has been a member of the Music Hall State Theatre in Saint Petersburg from 2016, where she performed as Micaela in Bizet's Carmen and as Kupava in Rimsky-Korsakov's The Snow Maiden. In 2017 she appeared in the title role of Tchaikovsky's Iolanta at both the Zazerkalie theatre and the Montenegro opera festival. She joined the Atkins Young Artists Program at the Mariinsky Theatre in 2017, training until 2021. She performed at the theatre first as Fiordiligi in Mozart's Così fan tutte, as Iolanta and as Mimi in Puccini's La bohème. Further roles there included Kupava, Oksana in Rimsky-Korsakov's Christmas Eve, conducted by Valery Gergiev, and the title role in Ariadne auf Naxos by R. Strauss. She performed the title role of Tchaikovsky's The Maid of Orleans in the theatre's new production for the Stars of the White Nights festival.

She appeared as Tatyana in Tchaikovsky's Eugene Onegin at the Deutsche Oper am Rhein and the Opernhaus Zürich, Liza in Tchaikovsky's Pique Dame at the Staatstheater Wiesbaden, and the title role of Puccini's Tosca at the Teatro Massimo Bellini in Catania.

She received prizes at competitions including the 2021 CulturArte Prize of the Operalia competition and won the 2022 the Monte-Carlo Voice Masters.
