= Olga Busuioc =

Moldovan soprano

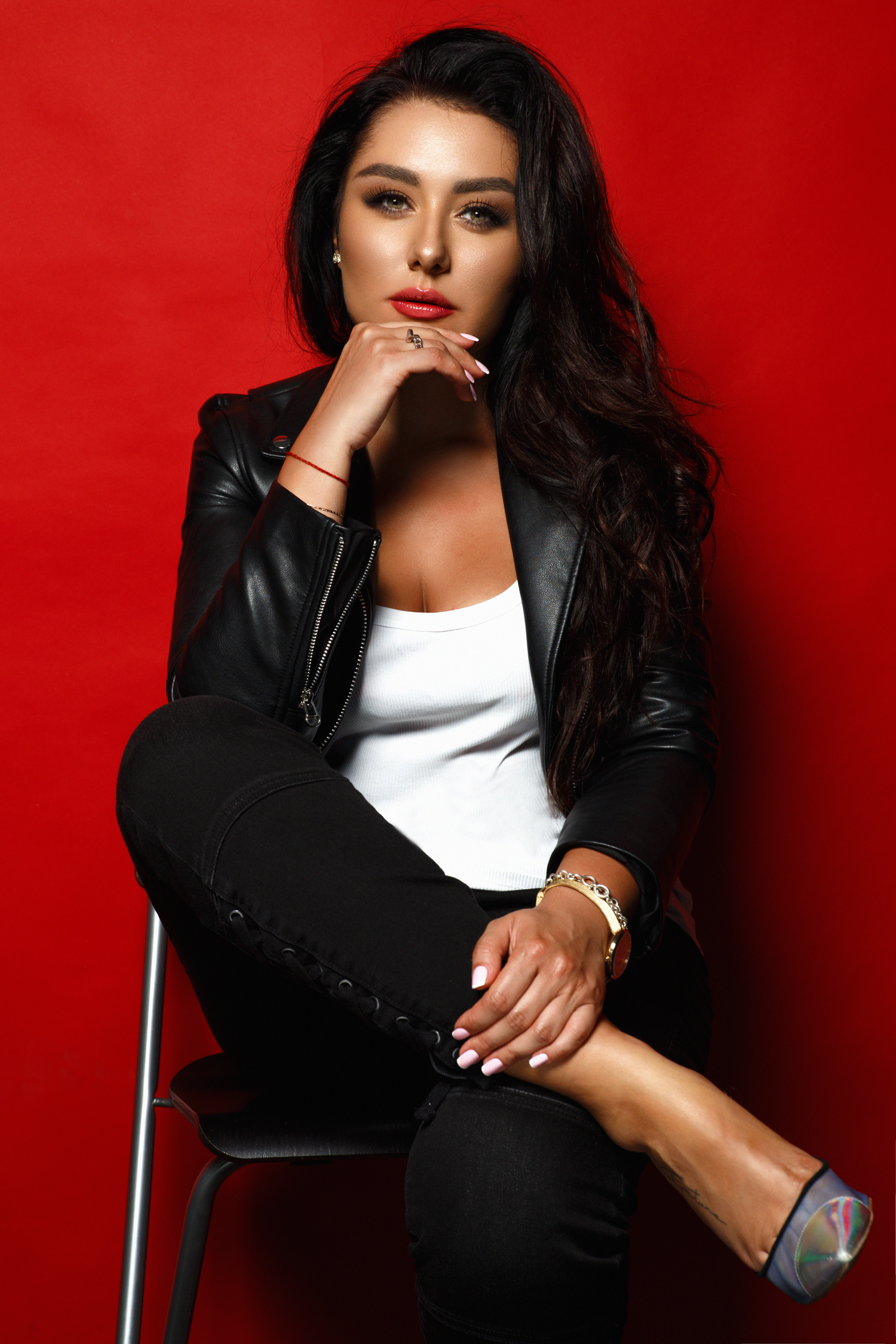
- Born: 1986 (age 39–40); Moldova
- Occupations: Musician; Soprano
- Years active: 2011–present
- Website: olgabusuioc.com

Olga Busuioc (born 1986) is a Moldovan soprano, currently based in Germany.

== Biography ==
Busuioc was born into a musical family. Her mother Tatiana is a soloist with the Chisinau National Opera, who often took her young daughter with her to performances. Her father is the tenor Nicolae Busuioc. She attended the Stefan Neaga as a chorus conductor, her professor was Oleg Constantinov. Music Academy and the State Academy of Music, Theatre and Fine Arts in Chisinau, where she studied singing with her mom Tatiana Busuioc. After graduating in 2010, she completed a two-year post-graduate course at the Bel Canto Academy in Modena, Italy where she studied with Mirella Freni.

== Awards ==
In 2011, she reached second place in the Operalia competition held in Moscow, where she was also awarded the Zarzuela Prize.

She was a finalist at the Hans Gabor Belvedere competition in Vienna. She won the Francesc Viñas Singing Competition in Barcelona in January 2012. In July she featured as one of the special prize winners at the Premi Extraordinari Festival Castell de Perelada in Barcelona, Spain. In 2013 she was awarded first place in Stanisław Moniuszko Singing Competition in Warsaw.

DVDs \ Recordings 2018 Madama Butterfly ( Glyndebourne Festival ) DVD Opus Arte

== Repertoire ==
G. Puccini

- La Bohème, Mimi
- Manon Lescaut, title role
- Turandot, Liu
- Madama Butterfly, title role

G. Verdi

- Don Carlos, Elisabeth
- Otello, Desdemona
- Simon Boccanegra, Amelia
- Requiem

A. Boito

- Mefistofele, Margherita/Elena

P. I. Tchaikovsky

- Iolanta, title role
- Eugene Onegin, Tatyana

G. Bizet • Carmen, Micaela

Fr. Cilea

- Adriana Lecouvreur, title role

W. A. Mozart

- Le nozze di Figaro, Contessa Almaviva

J. Offenbach

- Les contes d’Hoffmann, Antonia/Giulietta

J. Massenet

- Manon, title role

Fr. Poulenc

- Gloria

Felicien David

- Herculanum
