= Iván Ayón-Rivas =

Peruvian operatic tenor (born 1993)

- Born: 17 February 1993 (age 33); Piura, Peru
- Education: Conservatorio Nacional de Música (Peru)
- Occupation: Operatic tenor

Iván Ayón-Rivas (born 17 February 1993) is a Peruvian operatic tenor. A former student of the Conservatorio Nacional de Música in Lima, he perfectioned his artistry in Italy under the guidance of Roberto Servile. He achieved widespread fame in October 2021, as the winner of first prize at Plácido Domingo's international opera competition Operalia 2021.
