= Kathryn Lewek =

American opera singer (born 1983)

- Born: August 2, 1983 (age 43); East Lyme, Connecticut
- Education: Eastman School of Music; Music Academy of the West
- Occupation: Opera singer (soprano)
- Website: www.kathrynlewek.com

Kathryn Louise Blomshield Lewek (born August 2, 1983) is an American coloratura soprano singer.

== Early life and education ==
Lewek began playing piano and singing at a very young age but only during high school realized that she could turn it into a career. She did her studies at the Eastman School of Music before coming to Diana Soviero who set her forth. In 2009, she became a fellow at the Music Academy of the West in Montecito, California where she continued her coloratura soprano studies with Marilyn Horne.

== Career ==
From 2011 to 2017 Lewek sang Handel's Messiah with the Oratorio Society of New York at Carnegie Hall. During those years, she also performed both Mozart's and Verdi's Requiems, as well as Mass in B minor and Christmas Oratorio by Johann Sebastian Bach.

In 2013, regarding her Carnegie Hall debut in Handel’s Messiah, Corinna da Fonseca-Wollheim of The New York Times praised her “Communicative verve and thrilling beauty.” She also commented on her rendition of “Rejoice greatly, O daughter of Zion,” especially the tempo and embellishment choices, describing ‘He shall speak peace’ as “lovingly ornamenting the cadence in a way that was both original and entirely subservient to the music.”

She was advised not to sing the Queen of the Night in The Magic Flute, yet Lewek has performed the role hundreds of times in the finest opera houses in Europe and the United States, holding the record for most performances in the role at the Metropolitan Opera. She has sung at Aix-en-Provence and in Barcelona. In 2017 she appeared as Ginevra in Cecilia Bartoli's Ariodante at the Salzburg Festival. She has also portrayed the title role in Lucia di Lammermoor.

In 2017, she and Susanna Phillips sang the Mass in C-minor of Wolfgang Amadeus Mozart.

Since 2013, Lewek has performed Queen of the Night in The Magic Flute at the Metropolitan Opera every season.

In 2018, she sang as Zerbinetta in Ariadne auf Naxos with the patronage of the Deutsche Oper Berlin. The same year, she was scheduled to perform Cunegonde in Leonard Bernstein's Candide with Washington National Opera but pulled out due to pregnancy and was replaced by Emily Pogorelc.

In 2019, Lewek accused critics of insulting her figure, who called her body shape "buxom" and "stocky".

In 2024 Kathryn Lewek starred as Olympia, Antonia, and Giulietta in the Salzburg Festival production of The Tales of Hoffmann.
