= Hera Hyesang Park =

South Korean soprano (born 1988)

- Born: October 15, 1988 (age 37); South Korea
- Genres: Classical music, Opera
- Occupation: Soprano
- Years active: 2014–present
- Label: Deutsche Grammophon
- Website: herahyesangpark.com

Hera Hyesang Park (Korean: 박혜상; born October 15, 1988) is a South Korean soprano.

== Early life and education ==
Hera Park began her voice studies at Seoul National University, where she earned a Bachelor of Music degree in Vocal Performance. Before moving to the United States, she made her professional opera debut as Violetta in La traviata with Korea National Opera. She then attended the Juilliard School in New York City, graduating in 2017 with an Artist Diploma in Opera Studies. While at Juilliard, she performed Amina in La sonnambula and Fiorilla in Il turco in Italia.

== Career ==
=== Metropolitan Opera ===
Park was accepted into the Lindemann Young Artist Development Program at the Metropolitan Opera and made her Met debut as the First Wood Sprite in Dvořák's Rusalka in 2017, conducted by Sir Mark Elder. During the program, she also sang Barbarina in Le nozze di Figaro conducted by Harry Bicket and the Dew Fairy in Hansel and Gretel conducted by Sir Donald Runnicles.

She returned to the Met stage in 2019 as Amore in Gluck's Orfeo ed Euridice and has since performed several principal roles there, including Pamina in The Magic Flute (2021–2022), Nannetta in Falstaff (2023), and Zerlina in Don Giovanni (2025) under the baton of Yannick Nézet-Séguin.

=== Other opera engagements ===
Park has performed at many of the world's leading opera houses. At the Deutsche Staatsoper Berlin, she has sung Adina in L'elisir d'amore across multiple seasons. She made her Opéra national de Paris debut in Marina Abramovic's Seven Deaths of Maria Callas and later returned as Despina in Così fan tutte.

At Glyndebourne, she has performed Susanna in Le nozze di Figaro, Rosina in Il barbiere di Siviglia, and Despina in Così fan tutte. She also made her Bayerische Staatsoper debut as Despina, and performed Musetta in Barrie Kosky's production of La bohème and the title role of Paul Abraham's Dschainah at Komische Oper Berlin. At Korea National Opera she has sung Juliette in Roméo et Juliette and Violetta in La traviata.

In 2025 Hera Park made her debut in the title role of the Vixen in Janáček's The Cunning Little Vixen at Des Moines Metro Opera broadcast on PBS and at the Edinburgh International Festival in La clemenza di Tito. She returns to Edinburgh in 2026 as Zerlina in Don Giovanni in 2026.

In 2026, she sings Susanna in Le nozze di Figaro on tour across the United Kingdom and performs the role of Ilia in Mozart's Idomeneo with Boston Baroque, conducted by David Bates. She also performs as a soloist in Orff's Carmina Burana making her debut at the Verbier Festival.. In 2026 Hera Park will also make her debut as Mimmi in Puccini's La Boheme.

Park has been a frequent guest of major festivals, including Glyndebourne, the Verbier Festival, and the Edinburgh International Festival.

=== Concert career ===
Hera Hyesang Park is a distinguished concert and chamber music artist who has sung a wide repertoire in more than seven languages with some of the world's most prestigious orchestras. Highlights include Beethoven's Symphony No. 9 with Gustavo Dudamel and the Los Angeles Philharmonic, a gala concert with the New York Philharmonic (2024), Mahler's Symphony No. 4 with the Vienna Symphony, Brahms's Ein deutsches Requiem at Carnegie Hall, Mozart's Mass in C minor with the London Philharmonic Orchestra, Handel's Messiah with the St. Paul's Chamber Orchestra, and Haydn's Missa in tempore belli at the Tongyeong International Music Festival.

In 2025, she made her BBC Proms debut as a soloist in Mendelssohn's Symphony No. 2 "Lobgesang" with the Royal Northern Sinfonia conducted by Dinis Sousa at The Glasshouse in Gateshead.

In the 2025–26 season, she performs Richard Strauss's Four Last Songs and Vier Lieder on tour with orchestras in Asia, Europe, and South America, and made her debut at the Berlin Philharmonie singing Mendelssohn's Elijah with the Deutsches Symphonie-Orchester Berlin under Maxim Emelyanychev.

She is an avid recital singer and has appeared on stages including Vocal Arts DC, Alice Tully Hall, and Madrid's Auditorio Nacional de Música. She has toured with the Takács Quartet and the Metropolitan Opera ensemble.

In 2026, she is participating in multiple concerts across the world with distinguished artists such as Placido Domingo, Elina Garança, Larry Brownlee, Xavier Anduaga, and Angel Blue.

=== Recordings ===
In May 2020, Park became a Deutsche Grammophon exclusive recording artist. Her debut album I am Hera was released in November 2020, followed by her second album Breathe, which was awarded the Opus Klassik Award for Videoclip of the Year in 2024.

=== Teaching ===
In addition to her performing career, Park is a voice faculty member at the Solti Accademia and gives masterclasses around the world.

== Awards and competitions ==
- 2024 – Opus Klassik Award, Videoclip of the Year (for Breathe)
- 2016 – Gerda Lissner Foundation International Competition, First Prize
- 2015 – Montreal International Musical Competition, Second Prize and Audience Choice Award
- 2015 – Operalia, Second Prize
- 2015 – Operalia, Zarzuela Prize
- 2014 – Queen Elizabeth International Music Competition, Fifth Place
- 2010 – Korea National Opera Competition, First Place
- 2010 – Sejong Center for the Performing Arts Competition, First Place
- Korea Minister for Culture Prize

== Personal life ==
She resides in New York City.
