= He Hui =

Chinese opera singer (born 1972)

He Hui (Chinese: 和慧; born 1972 in Ankang, China), is a Chinese operatic lirico-spinto soprano known in the West and on record covers as Hui He.

He Hui trained vocally at the Conservatory in Xi'an under Professor Rao Yujian (饶余鋻). One of the winners (2nd place) of the Operalia Competition in 2000 and the Verdi Competition in Busseto Voci Verdiane in 2002 (1st place), she began as a mezzo-soprano and made her operatic debut in Shanghai, China in Mozart's Cosi fan tutte as Dorabella. Her first operatic acclaim in Europe came when performing the role of Cio Cio San in Puccini's Madama Butterfly. She was also chosen to sing Cio Cio San in the Italian production of Madama Butterfly which celebrated the centenary of the opera's first performance and which was seen throughout Italy.

She was the first Chinese soprano to assume the Verdian role of Aida, she debuted this role in Vienna (2008), New York (2010), and Chicago (2012). She has remained associated with this role and has recorded it twice on video. She is also known for singing the title role in Puccini's opera Tosca, which brought her her first major breakthrough in European opera houses. Her operatic repertoire comprises some 12 Verdian soprano roles and 12 verismo operatic roles, 7 of which belong to Puccini. In 2013 the 200th year of Verdi's birth, she performed Verdi's Requiem at the Arena di Verona and Aida in La Scala. She also takes up the Elsa in Richard Wagner's Lohengrin in 2013. He Hui resides at Verona, Italy. She was also featured in the 2017-2018 season at the Metropolitan Opera of New York as Cio Cio San in the opera Madama Butterfly. She continues to sing this role in New York in the season 2019-2020.

== Connections in China ==
He Hui maintains a close relationship with Chinese classical music circles and performed at the National Opera House Beijing in Verdi's 'Un Ballo Di Maschera' in 2012.

In December 2013, a scheduled recital of Verdian opera excerpts at Xi'an had to be cancelled when the soprano reported a loss of voice after a heated row with the management of the performance venue over rehearsal arrangements.

In January 2015, she sang the title role of Aida under Zubin Mehta at the Beijing National Centre for the Performing Arts.

== Discography ==
CD

- Hui He Sings Verdi & Puccini - Arias from Aida, Un Ballo in Maschera, Il Trovatore, Atilla, Manon Lescaut, Madam Butterfly, Tosca & Turandot. Oehms.

DVD

- Verdi: Aida - Maggio Musicale Fiorentino, Zubin Mehta, Florence 2011
- Verdi: Aida - Arena di Verona, Daniel Oren, Verona 2012 - released on Opus Arte
- Madame Butterfly - The Trace of the Butterfly - Documentary including highlights from Puccini Festival performance in Torre del Lago.
