= Adela Zaharia =

Romanian operatic soprano (born 1987)

- Born: 1987 (age 38–39); Arad, Romania
- Genre: Opera
- Occupation: Opera singer (soprano)
- Years active: 2000–present

Adela Zaharia (Romanian pronunciation: [adel'a zaha'ria]; born 1987) is a Romanian operatic soprano. She has enjoyed a high-profile career since moving to Germany where she initially worked at Komische Oper Berlin. In 2017 she won first place at the Operalia, The World Opera Competition.She is currently a soloist at the Deutsche Oper am Rhein, Düsseldorf.

== Early life and education ==
Born in Arad, Romania, Zaharia studied piano from the age of six and later, music theory. She first sang with her church and high school choir.

Silvia Demian the former director of the Sabin Drăgoi College of Art Zaharia studied claimed, the soprano's "lucky star" was meeting Mariana Nicolesco when Zaharia won the National Music Olympiad.

Zaharia earned her bachelor's degree and master's degree, from Gheorghe Dima Music Academy studying voice and piano with Marius Budoiu.

== Career ==
Zaharia made her debut in 2010 with the Romanian National Opera, Cluj-Napoca as Gilda in Rigoletto, followed by Norina in Don Pasquale, Musetta in La bohème, and Michaela in Carmen.

From 2012 to 2014 Zaharia was an ensemble member of the Komische Oper Berlin, where she performed as Musetta (La bohème), Pamina (The Magic Flute), Donna Anna (Don Giovanni), Helena (A Midsummer Night's Dream) and Micaëla (Carmen). Other roles include Donna Anna (Don Giovanni), Norina's (Don Pasquale) and Gilda's (Rigoletto) repertoire. Since the 2015/16 season, Zaharia has been a member of the Deutsche Oper am Rhein, where she performed as Snow Queen in The Snow Queen, Najade in Ariadne auf Naxos Lucia di Lammermoor, Konstanze (Mozart's The Abduction from the Seraglio), (Mozart's Don Giovanni) among others. In the 2017/18 season she will perform as Le Feu in L'enfant et les sortilèges, Gilda, Lucia and Konstanze. Guest engagements include Zaharia as Pamina at the Komische Oper Berlin; Gilda in Rigoletto and Violetta in La traviata at the Los Angeles Opera.

In December 2017 she gave her debut as Lucia at the Bavarian State Opera in Munich, Germany, substituting for Diana Damrau, who withdrew due to illness. As of 2018, she continues to collaborate with Komische Oper Berlin and has been debuting on stages such as Gran Teatre del Liceu Barcelona, Bolshoi Theatre Moscow, Edinburgh International Festival and Shanghai Grand Theatre.

Additional 2017/18 season include her debut as Elisabetta in Roberto Devereux at the Frankfurt's Opera and Play House, her debut at the George Enescu Festival with the mad scene from Iain Bell’s A Harlot's Progress and a three-week tour in Japan, where she will play Pamina in Die Zauberflöte. Zaharia is also scheduled to perform with Plácido Domingo at a concert with the Jalisco Philharmonic Orchestra in Guadalajara.

== Prizes ==
She was a winner of the Hariclea Darclée Festival and International Voice Competition in 2012. In 2017, she won first prize and the Zarzuela Prize of the Operalia, The World Opera Competition, held that year in Astana, Kazakhstan. Euronews, in an article about Placido Domingo's Operalia 2017, praised Zaharia as being "the true revelation of the competition".
