= Seo Jung-hack =

South Korean baritone singer

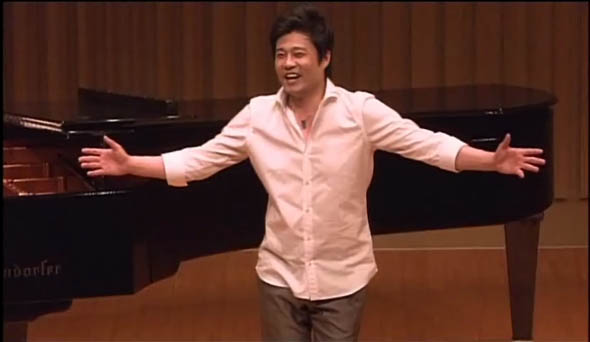
- Jung-hack during his first solo Concert in Japan on April 10, 2009, at Ginza Oji Hall Tokyo, Japan Under the title of "REINCARNAZIONE" Vol1. La Confession.

Korean name
- Hangul: 서정학
- Hanja: 徐廷學
- RR: Seo Jeonghak
- MR: Sŏ Chŏnghak

Seo Jung-hack (Korean: 서정학) is a South Korean baritone singer.

== Career ==
=== 1990s and 2000s ===
South Korean Baritone to Perform with the Metropolitan Opera Company (1997–98).

After graduating from Seoul National University, Jung-Hack Seo entered the Curtis Institute of Music.

He debuted with the San Francisco Opera in 1993 where he was the First Asian singer to win the Schwabache Family Award.

In 1996, Seo went on to win the Metropolitan Opera Competition and enter the Metropolitan Opera Young Artist Development Program.

In 1997, he performed the title role in "Ill Barbiere di Siviglia" and other programs with the Metropolitan Opera Company.

In 1997, he entered the Operalia, The World Opera Competition and placed second.

He has performed with numerous world class opera companies besides the Metropolitan Opera, such as the Wiener Staatsoper. The Opera Company of Philadelphia, the Connecticut Grand Opra, Tulsa Opera, the Dallas Opera, The San Francisco Opera and the Opera of the Pacific.

He studied under In-Young Lee, Marlena Malas, Renata Scotto, Robert Merill.

=== 2000s - present ===
2006 Don Carlo at Seoul Arts Center

2004 Oct. Lucia Di Lanmermoor at Seoul Arts Center

=== Performance in Japan ===
2010 June 11 "REINCARNAZIONE" Vol.3 Finale The Road To Music at Bunkamura Orchard Hall
performed with Tokyo Philharmony Orchestra, Conducted by Mr. Park Sang-Hyun
2009 July 17 Solo Concert "REINCARNAZIONE" Vol.2 l'Indicatore stradale poi l'amore at Ginza Oji Hall
2009 July 14 Solo Concert "REINCARNAZIONE" Vol.2 l'Indicatore stradale poi l'amore at Kyoto Concert Hall
2009 April 10 Solo Concert "REINCARNAZIONE" Vol.1 La Confession at Ginza Oji Hall
2009 March 6 Solo Concert "REINCARNAZIONE" Prelude Svegliando at Saloon Tezzerra
2008 March and May Gala Concert>br> 2004 December 19 "Beethoven No.9 At Tokorozawa"

== Recordings ==
The American Russian Youth Orchestra in Concert

== Notes and references ==
- METROPOLITAN OPERA NATIONAL COUNCIL WINNERS See 1996 Winner Seo, Jung-Hack PDF Files
- Seoul National University Seoul National University
- Seoul National University College of MusicCollege of Music
- Seoul Arts Center
- The Licia Albanese-Puccini Foundation International Vocal Competition 1996 The Licia Albanese-Puccini Foundation - 1996 Winners
- Romeo et Juliette Role: Paris Dated on March 28, 1998
- Ill Barbiere di Siviglia Role: Fiorello (title role) Dated on Dec. 20, 1997
- 1996 Met Competition.
- Search of Jung-Hack Seo News *Online&sp-i=1
- Merola Opera Merola Opera Highlights 1996
- "Jung-Hack Seo". The New York Times.
