= Maria Mudryak =

Kazakh operatic soprano (born 1994)

- Мария Мудряк
- Born: April 6, 1994 (age 32); Pavlodar, Kazakhstan
- Citizenship: Kazakh, Italian
- Education: Milan Conservatory
- Occupation: Opera singer (soprano)
- Years active: 2014–present
- Website: mariamudryak.com

Maria Mudryak (born April 6, 1994) is a Kazakh operatic soprano.

== Childhood and education ==
Born in Pavlodar, Kazakhstan, on April 6, 1994, Mudryak showed a strong interest in music and singing in her early childhood.

She first sang in front of an audience when she was three years old and recorded a CD of children's songs at the age of six.

She then turned her attention to opera and moved to Italy to start her vocal training at the age of ten. One year later she was admitted into the Children Chorus of the Teatro alla Scala; at fourteen she was accepted into the Giuseppe Verdi Conservatory of Milan, from which she graduated with honors at the age of 18. At the same time she attended the “Scuola musicale di Milano” where she studied with Maestro Carlo Gaifa. In the summer of 2014 she was accepted into the “Young Singers Project” at the Salzburg Festival.

== Competitions and first engagements ==
After winning several voice competitions (including the Concorso per giovani cantanti d'Europa As.li.co and "The Opera Ball" in Kazakhstan), Mudryak made her operatic debut as Susanna in Mozart's Le nozze di Figaro at the Teatro Carlo Felice of Genoa in March 2014, Giulietta in Les Contes d’Hoffman in Italian Theaters like Teatro Donizetti di Bergamo, Teatro Ponchielli di Cremona, Teatro Sociale di Como, Teatro Fraschini di Pavia, and in same theaters as Norina in Don Pasquale of Donizetti . In 2017 at age of 23 years old she was winner of third place and Audience Prize by Rolex in Plácido Domingo's Operalia competition.

== Career from 2015 to present ==
In the years 2015 to 2017 Mudryak's engagements included Adina in Donizetti's L'elisir d'amore and Musetta in La bohème at the Teatro Alighieri in Ravenna, Musetta at the NCPA Mumbai, Mimì in La bohème at the Teatro Carlo Coccia in Novara, at the Teatro del Maggio Musicale Fiorentino in Florence and at the Astana Opera, Norina in Don Pasquale in Bergamo, Como, Jesi and Pavia, Susanna in Le nozze di Figaro at the Teatro Petruzzelli in Bari, Giulia in Rossini's La scala di seta in Liège, Violetta in La traviata at the Astana Opera, at the Teatro del Maggio Musicale Fiorentino in Florence and in open air performances at the Palazzo Pitti in Florence, the Teatro Carlo Felice Genoa, Teatro San Carlo Naples, Liù in Puccini's Turandot for the inauguration of the Shaanxi Grand Theatre in China, Oscar in Verdi's Un ballo in maschera at the NCPA Opera Festival Beijing. She also sang excerpts as Gilda in Verdi's Rigoletto and Luisa in Luisa Miller at gala concerts in Modena and Piacenza celebrating baritone Leo Nucci's career. She made her role debut as Gilda in Verdi's Rigoletto in December 2017 with Leo Nucci in the title role, in February 2018 she returned to the Teatro San Carlo in Naples in the title role of a new production of La traviata and in July 2018 she made her house debut at the Bolshoi Theatre of Moscow as Mimì in La bohème

In November 2021, it was announced that Mudryak will perform with Bulgarian baritone Vladimir Stoyanov at the Astana Opera House as part of a concert called “For You, My Kazakhstan.” The concert is being held to mark the 30th anniversary of the Independence of Kazakhstan and the Day of the First President.

== Collaboration with conductors and stage directors ==
Mudryak has worked with several prestigious conductor and stage directors, among them conductors Daniel Oren, Riccardo Muti Carlo Rizzi, Renato Palumbo, Stefano Ranzani and Gabriele Ferro and stage directors Marta Domingo, Leo Nucci, Hugo De Ana, Ferzan Ozpetek and Chiara Muti.

== Repertoire ==
- Violetta Valéry, La traviata (Verdi)
- Marguerite, Faust (Gounod)
- Adina, L'elisir d'amore (Donizetti)
- Giulia, La scala di seta (Rossini)
- Giulietta, Les contes d'Hoffmann (Offenbach)
- Liù, Turandot (Puccini)
- Mimì, La bohème (Puccini)
- Musetta, La bohème (Puccini)
- Susanna, Le nozze di Figaro (Mozart)
