= Rame Lahaj =

Kosovan operatic tenor (born 1983)

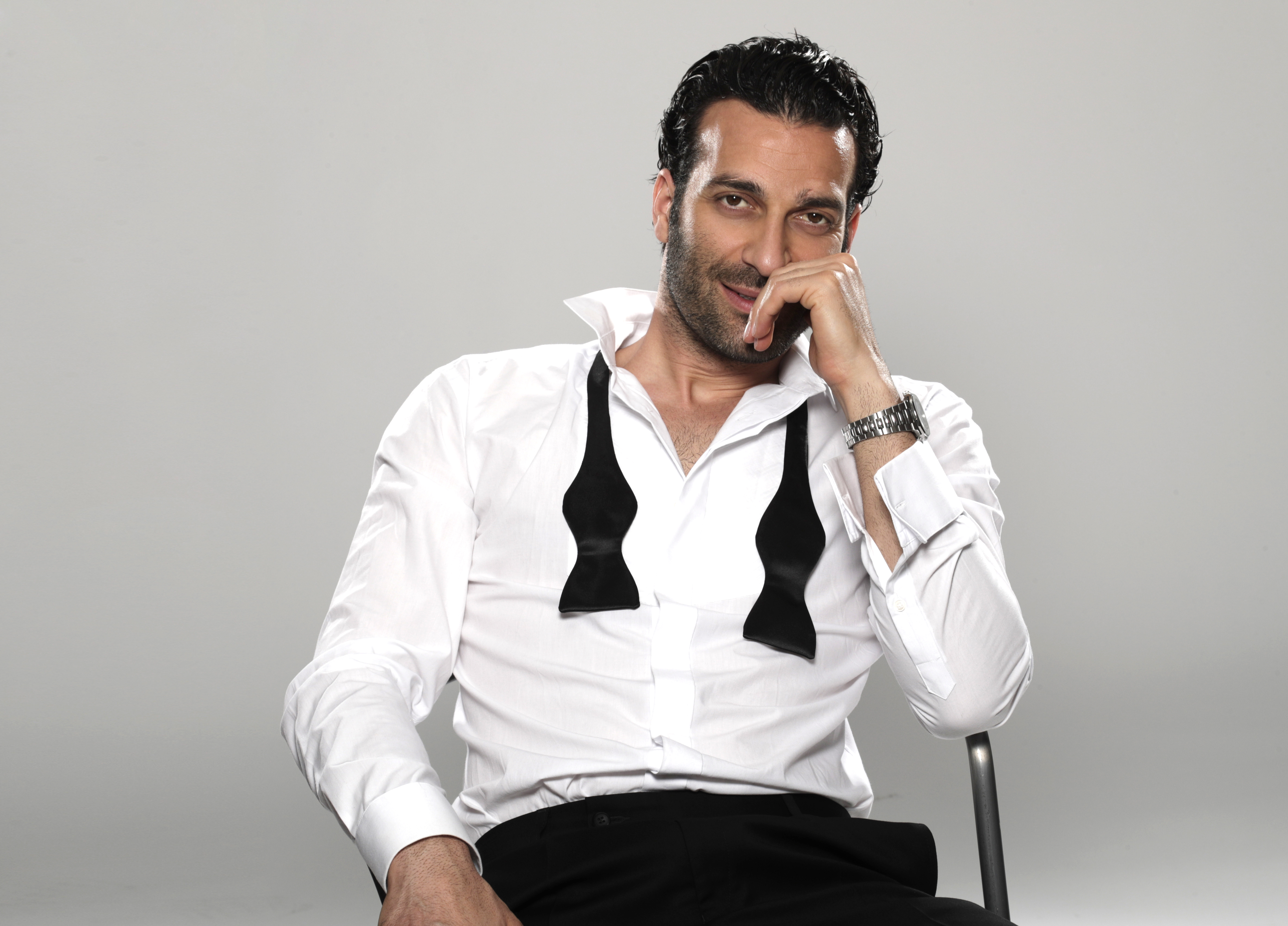
- Portrait of Rame Lahaj
- Born: November 3, 1983 (age 42); Istog, Kosovo
- Occupation: Operatic tenor
- Years active: 2010-present

Rame Lahaj (Albanian pronunciation: [ˈɾamɛ ˈlahaj]; born 3 November 1983) is a Kosovar operatic tenor. Among his notable roles are Alfredo (La Traviata), Duke of Mantua (Rigoletto), and Rodolfo (La Bohème).

Lahaj is considered as one of the first Kosova opera artists to have performed in the world's most prominent opera houses, sharing stage with opera legends such as Placido Domingo, who later on honored him with The World Opera Competition's prize, "Operalia".

During his first decade in the profession, Lahaj appeared on the most prestigious stages of opera houses. Including in this case Royal Opera House Covent Garden, Paris National Opera, Bolshoi Theater Moscow, Gran Teatre del Liceu, Arena di Verona, Opera Australia Sydney, Los Angeles Opera, Teatro Real-Madrid, Deutsche Oper Berlin, StaatsoperBerlin, Haus Für Mozart-Salzburg, Semperoper Dresden, Royal Albert Hall, Opera Tel Aviv, Teatro Massimo di Palermo and many others.

== Early life and musical training ==
Rame Lahaj was born in Istog, Kosova. He grew up in a non-musical family of eight children. Lahaj was 15 years old when the war in Kosova broke out. He dedicates all his success to his mother Hale Lahaj.

Music wasn't part of Lahaj's life until very late. He graduated from the University of Arts in Tirana in 2008. After graduation, Lahaj worked as an artistic director at the RTV 21 channel in Kosova from 2009 to 2010, while being inactive in music then. At the age of 21, he began his professional musical training in f and later on in Tirana, Albania.

Lahaj's first ever debut was Alfredo from La Traviata in the Eutin Festspiele 2010. Lahaj is currently working with Jean Bernard Thomas, who specializes on the Garcían school of vocal training.

== Career ==
Lahaj made his professional debut at the Eutin Festspiele as Alfredo Germont in La Traviata. His next appearance was as Macduff in Macbeth in the following production, which took place in 2011 at the Hungarian State Opera in Budapest.

Lahaj began building his repertoire in the German scene as well, with multiple premiere performances. The tenor arrived in Dortmund with another significant role for his repertoire, Rodolfo in La bohème. In 2012 he received an invitation to perform at the National Opera of Lyon in France as part of the Puritani opera production. In the same year, he performed Rodolfo in La Bohème at the National Opera de Montpellier. After debuting the role of Duca di Mantova (Rigoletto) at Teatro Massimo di Palermo, his career in Italy began. The 2013/14 season placed him in houses such as Semperoper Dresden and Deutsche Oper Berlin as Duca di Mantova (Rigoletto), and as Alfredo (La Traviata) at the Hamburg State Opera. Lahaj's performance as Rodolfo (La Bohème) on The Royal Albert Hall, during the 2014/15 season. The tenor was featured in media outlets and radio such as the BBC channel.

He played the role of Duca di Mantova (Rigoletto) in La Monnaie Opera in Brussels and Haus für Mozart in Salzburg. He was considered to be an ideal cast for Duca, not only vocally but also visually. Warsaw National Opera was also on his schedule, with his two favorite roles at the time, Duca and Alfredo. Pinkerton (Madama Butterfly) was one of the artist's next debuts, performed at the Puccini Festival in Torre Del Lago, Italy. A season later, he was invited to perform the same role at Opera Las Palmas in Spain.

During 2015, Lahaj expanded his international performances including Sydney Opera House in Australia, where he performed the character of Alfredo (La Traviata). In his Australian debut Lahaj reportedly “cut a dashing figure as Alfredo. Not only was his voice strong enough to carry far into the back of the auditorium, but it was also smooth and flexible enough to deliver the nuances of his wildly fluctuating moods.”

In 2016 he was named a lyric singer in the world's largest operatic competition, Placido Domingo's Operalia, which was held in Mexico. This season also marked his Paris National Opera debut as Edgardo (Lucia di Lammermoor), where he also performed Alfredo (La Traviata) alongside Plácido Domingo and Marina Rebeka. During the 2017/18 season, he performed Alfredo (La Traviata) at the Bolshoi in Moscow, where Lahaj also performed Rodolfo (La bohème). Lahaj continued with Alfredo to Berlin State Opera and Opéra national de Paris. Next was Duca (Rigoletto) at the Finnish National Opera in Helsinki with Kasper Holten in Malmö. He took part in the Verdi Opera Night Concert in Arena di Verona as well as international concert tours, among others with Angela Gheorghiu in South Korea.

Lahaj's engagements in 2018/19 include his house premiere as Pinkerton (Madame Butterfly) at the Gran Teatre de Liceu de Barcelona. Alfredo (La Traviata) at the Los Angeles Opera directed by Marta Domingo and conducted by James Conlon. Lahaj, as Alfredo was “perceived to be a convincing and ardent suitor who cycles through turbulent emotions.

This season, Lahaj again returned to the Bolshoi as Alfredo (La Traviata) and a new production of La bohème (Rodolfo). He went on to perform as Alfredo in Berlin's Staatsoper Unter den Linden. Lahaj marked this season by performing Bruckner’s Te Deum at the Borusan Istanbul Philharmonics and in the Latvian National Opera’s 100th-anniversary celebration. During this season he also performed the melodrama by Gaetano Donizetti, L'elisir d'amore, at the Teatro Real Madrid.

Following the pandemic, he began 2020/21 season at Opera Australia Sydney as Alfredo, where “he masterfully captured the naiveté of a young man who would fall heedlessly in love with a society woman”. This production is now broadcast in many cinemas around the world. In 2021, after 10 years on stage, Lahaj made his debut in the new role of Mario Cavaradossi in Giacomo Puccini's Tosca, at Teatro Petruzzelli, where he shared the stage together with Ailyn Pérez, Franco Vassallo and others and Giampaolo Bisanti as a conductor. He also reunited again on the stage during the 2022/23 season with Placido Domingo in Elbphilharmonie, Hamburg.

== Opera roles ==
- Alfredo, La traviata (Verdi)
- Duke of Mantua, Rigoletto (Verdi)
- Macduff, Macbeth (Verdi)
- Rodolfo, La Bohème (Puccini)
- Mario Cavaradossi, Tosca (Puccini)
- Pinkerton, Madama Butterfly (Puccini)
- Rinuccio, Gianni Schicchi (Puccini)
- Edgardo, Lucia di Lammermoor (Donizetti)
- Nemorino, L'elisir d'amore (Donizetti)
- Faust, Faust (Charles Gounod)
- Ferrando, Così fan tutte (Wolfgang Amadeus Mozart)
- Werther, Werther (Jules Massenet)

== Other work ==
The “Rame Lahaj International Opera Festival" was established in 2021 with the intention to connect the Kosovar scene to the international one. The concert „Rame Lahaj & Friends” was created upon the thought of evolving into a Festival and Foundation focused especially on younger artists, their art, and Kosovar culture overall. Its main goal was however to promote the Kosovar state and its performers to a wider international public. Rame Lahaj International Opera Festival became the first regional and local event based solely on operatic nature. It is hosted in a country that does not possess any opera houses nor a very large opera tradition. With the help of Rame Lahaj Foundation, Lahaj aims to support emerging talents and best students from the RLIOF festival by offering them masterclasses abroad or bursaries for their studies.

== Awards and honours ==
Rame Lahaj has won various accolades, the most notable of which is Operalia. Furthermore, he was awarded the 10th Independence Anniversary Medal by the President of the Republic of Kosova, with the objective "Drawing Kosova Closer to the International Arena Through the Art of Opera." Notably, he was both honored by the Prime Minister of Kosova and proclaimed a Global Ambassador of Kosova around the world.
