= Dmitry Voropaev =

Azerbaijani singer

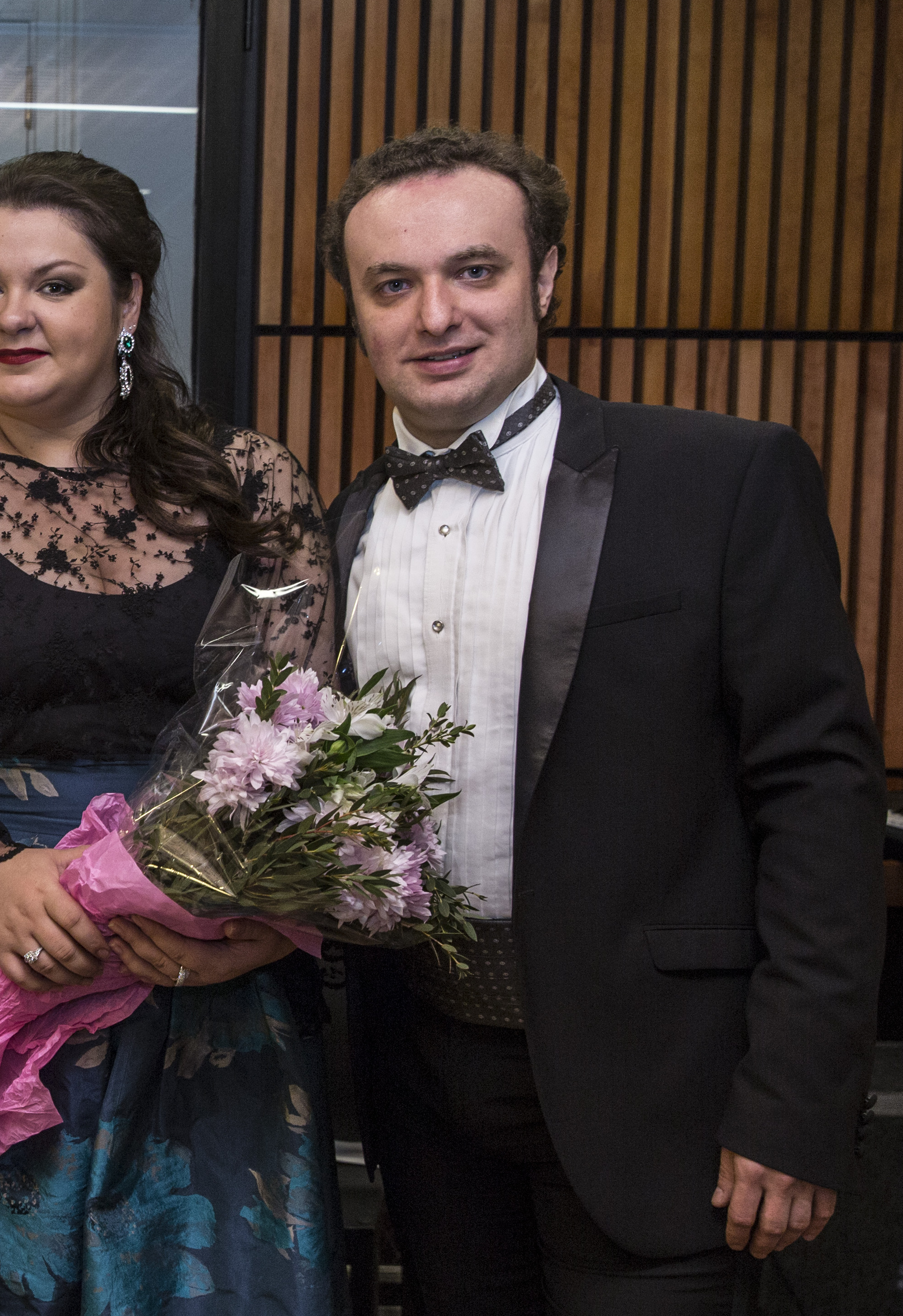
- Voropaev in 2015
- Born: Baku, Azerbaijan

Dmitry Voropaev is а tenor singer.

== Biography ==
Voropaev was born in Baku. In 1998 he graduated from Saint Petersburg Academic Capella and five years later got a diploma from Saint Petersburg Conservatory. The same year, he made his first appearance at the Mariinsky Theatre's The Barber of Seville where he played the role of Count Almaviva. Prior to it, in 2000, he was a soloist at the Mariinsky Academy of Young Singers and was also Young Opera Singers’ Competition winner. In 2004 he participated at the Mirjam Helin International Singing Competition in Helsinki and won third prize at the Operalia Competition.

He performed Das Lied von der Erde at the Oper Graz, and then had various performances at French opera houses such as Grand Théâtre de Bordeaux and Théâtre du Châtelet, as well as British Wigmore Hall and Concertgebouw in the Netherlands. He also worked with conductors like Valery Gergiev, Pierre Boulez, Eri Klas, Aleksandr Titov, Aleksandr Dmitriyev and Gianandrea Noseda and was a performer of Franz Schubert's Stabat Mater in G minor and Mass No. 2. He also did many works of Bach including Magnificat, Christmas Oratorio, and Coffee Cantata as well as Mozart's Requiem, George Frideric Handel's Messiah, Beethoven's Christ on the Mount of Olives and Igor Stravinsky's works such as The Fable of the Vixen, the Cock, the Cat and the Goat and Pulcinella.

== Repertoire at the Mariinsky Theatre ==
- Eugene Onegin — Lensky
- Sadko — Indian merchant
- Boris Godunov — Simpleton
- The Tsar's Bride — Ivan Lykov
- The Nightingale — fisherman
- The Barber of Seville — Count Almaviva
- The Tale of Tsar Saltan — Guidon
- Il viaggio a Reims — Belfiore
- La traviata — Alfredo
- Falstaff — Fenton
- Pagliacci — Beppe
- Don Giovanni — Don Ottavio
- Così fan tutte — Ferrando
- Idomeneo — Idomeneo
- The Magic Flute — Monostatos
- L'elisir d'amore — Nemorino
- Tristan und Isolde — sailor
- Les Troyens — Hylas
- Salome — First Jew
