= Enkhbatyn Amartüvshin =

Mongolian singer

Enkhbatyn Amartuvshin, (Mongolian: Энхбатын Амартүвшин; born 23 March 1986), is a Mongolian operatic baritone and People's Artist of Mongolia. Also known as Amartuvshin Enkhbat, he has been a soloist in the State Academic Opera and Ballet Theatre of Mongolia since 2008.

== Education ==
Amartüvshin was born on 23 March 1986 in Sukhbaatar in Mongolia. In 2009 he graduated from State University of Arts and Culture, Ulaanbaatar, Mongolia (class of Professor Mrs. Tserenpil Eruu).

== Competitions and awards ==
Amartüvshin won numerous national and international opera competitions, including the Mongolian National Competition for Young Opera Singers (2009, II Prize), international opera competition BAIKAL in Ulan-Ude, Russia (2011, I prize), XIV Tchaikovsky Competition in St. Petersburg, Russia (2011, II prize and a public award for the best male singer), Operalia Competition, Beijing, China (2012, I prize). He also won the Dame Joan Sutherland Audience Prize at the 2015 BBC Cardiff Singer of the World competition. He won the "Premio Ettore Bastianini 2024" assigned by the Associazione Internazionale Culturale Musicale Ettore Bastianini. Amartüvshin was twice awarded the prize "Best Opera Baritone" at the International Opera Awards, unofficially called the "Opera Oscars", in 2021 and 2023.

== Repertoire ==
His stage roles have included Escamillo in Carmen, Tonio in Pagliacci, Aleko in Aleko (Rachmaninoff), Genghis Khan in Genghis Khan by Byambasuren Sharav, Onegin in Eugene Onegin, Prince Yeletsky in The Queen of Spades, Amonasro in Aida, Count di Luna in Il Trovatore, Giorgio Germont in La Traviata as well as the title roles in Nabucco and Rigoletto.
