= Elena Manistina =

Russian operatic mezzo-soprano (born 1973)

- Елена Манистина
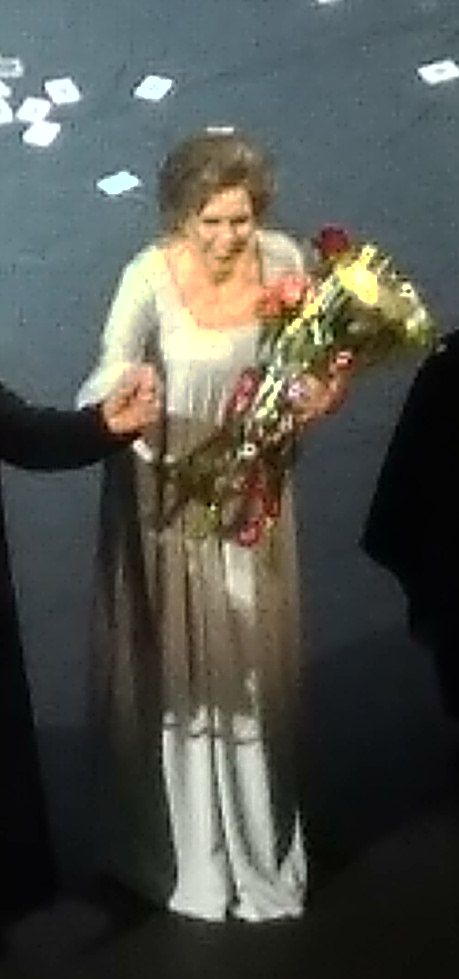
- Born: Elena Aleksandrovna Manistina; 16 November 1973 (age 52); Saratov, Soviet Union
- Education: Saratov Conservatory; Moscow Conservatory
- Occupation: Operatic mezzo-soprano
- Organization: Bolshoi Theatre

Elena Aleksandrovna Manistina (Russian: Елена Александровна Манистина, born 1973) is a Russian operatic mezzo-soprano. She is a member of the Bolshoi Theatre and has appeared in many operas internationally. She also appeared as Verdi's Azucena at the Metropolitan Opera, the Deutsche Oper Berlin and Opéra Bastille, and as Amneris at the Arena di Verona.

== Early life ==
Manistina was born in Saratov in 1973 and studied at the Saratov Conservatory. Her parents were both singers: her mother was a soprano and her father was a bass soloist. While a student at the conservatory, she performed at the Saratov Opera, and made her debut as Marfa in Mussorgsky's Khovanshchina. After graduation, she studied at the Moscow Conservatory, and graduated in 2000.

== Career ==
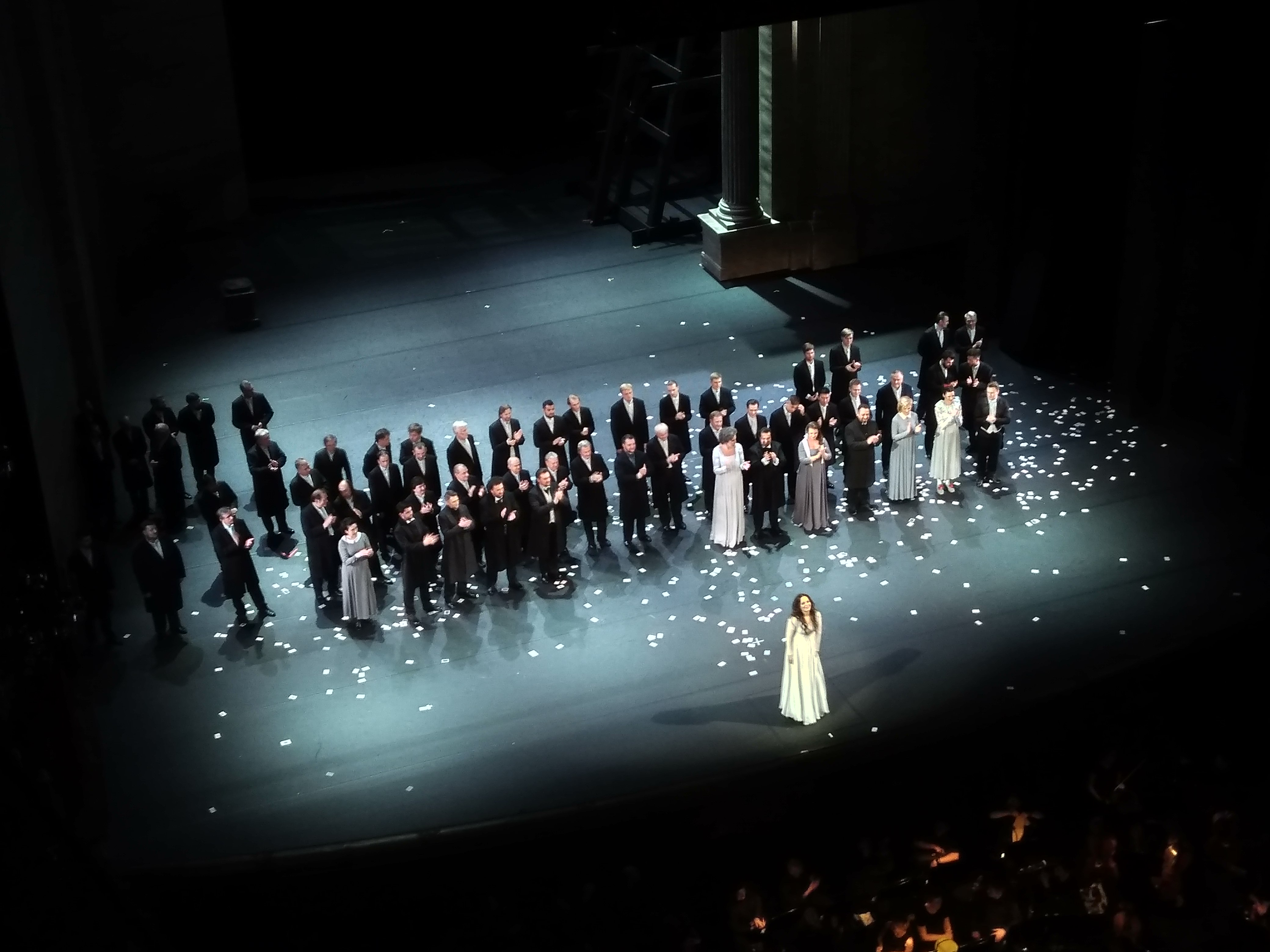
The Queen of Spades at the Bolshoi Theatre, Moscow (The Countess — Elena Manistina), July 2019

In 2002 she competed in the Operalia competition and won first prize: the competition was also known as the 10th International Placido Domingo competition. In 2003 she was a finalist in the BBC Cardiff Singer of the World competition.

In 1999 she became a member of the Stanislavski and Nemirovich-Danchenko Theatre in Moscow, and the following year was accepted to the troupe of the Bolshoi Theatre. Her roles have included Helene Bezukhova in Prokofiev's War and Peace, Marina in Mussorgsky's Boris Godunov, Princess Evpraksia Romanovna in Tchaikovsky's The Enchantress, Epanchina in Weinberg's The Idiot, and Ježibaba in Dvořák's Rusalka.

She has performed at the Royal Opera House in London, the Bavarian State Opera, La Monnaie in Brussels, and the Teatro Municipal in Santiago de Chile. She appeared as Azucena in Verdi's Il trovatore at the Metropolitan Opera, and she appeared in the same role at the Deutsche Oper Berlin, the Washington National Opera, and the Opéra Bastille in Paris. She performed as Amneris in Verdi's Aida at the Arena di Verona.

In 2022, when a castmember became ill, Manistina was flown in from Moscow to sing the part of Princess for the first performance of Tchaikovsky's The Enchantress at the Oper Frankfurt. While the assistant director played the part onstage, Manistina sang from the side with a powerful voice and "explosive singing".

In concert, she has appeared in Mahler's Symphony No. 3 with the Royal Scottish Symphony Orchestra and his Symphony No. 8 at the Hollywood Bowl, conducted by Esa-Pekka Salonen.
