= Emily Pogorelc =

American operatic soprano

- Born: July 1996 (age 29); Milwaukee, Wisconsin, U.S.
- Education: Curtis Institute of Music; Studio of the Lyric Opera of Chicago
- Occupation: Operatic soprano
- Organizations: Bavarian State Opera
- Website: www.emilypogorelc.com/about/

Emily Pogorelc (born July 1996) is an American operatic soprano. She is a member of the Bavarian State Opera in Munich, and has performed leading roles internationally.

== Life and career ==
Born in Milwaukee, Wisconsin Pogorelc studied at the Curtis Institute of Music in Philadelphia, graduating in 2018. She won the Ginette Theano Prize for Most Promising Talent at the first Glyndebourne Festival Opera competition in 2018. Pogorelc made her debut as Cunegonde in Bernstein's Candide at the Washington National Opera. She then took part in the Mozart Académie of the Aix-en-Provence Festival, and at the Britten-Pears Young Artist Programme of the Aldeburgh Festival. She performed at the Glimmerglass Festival, as Romilda in Handel's Serse, as Berenice in Rossini's L'occasione fa il ladro, and as Johanna in Sondheim's Sweeney Todd. Pogorelc was a member of the Ryan Opera Center at the Lyric Opera of Chicago, where she covered Ilia in Mozart's Idomeneo, Zerlina in Don Giovanni, and the Voice of the Forest Bird and Woglinde in Wagner's Der Ring des Nibelungen. She performed several small roles at the Lyric Opera.

Pogorelc became a member of the Bavarian State Opera in 2020, where her first role was Zaunschlüpfer in Die Vögel by Walter Braunfels, followed by Gretel in Humperdinck's Hänsel und Gretel, Sofia in Rossini's Il signor Bruschino, Pamina in Mozart's Die Zauberflöte, Adina in Donizetti's L'elisir d'amore, Musetta in Puccini's La bohème, and Ilia in Mozart's Idomeneo. She appeared as Cherubino in Mozart's Le nozze di Figaro as part of the 2021 Munich Opera Festival. She performed there as Lauretta in a 2021 revival of a 2017 production of Puccini's Gianni Schicchi, directed by Lotte de Beer and conducted Bertrand de Billy, alongside Ambrogio Maestri in the title role. She won a third prize at the Operalia competition in 2021. In 2023, she made her house and role debut as Amina in Bellini's La sonnambula at the Semperoper Dresden, in a new production by Rolando Villazón.

Pogorelc made her Metropolitan Opera debut as Lisette in Puccini’s La rondine in March 2024, subsequently performing Musetta and Pamina there as well. In 2025, she made her house and role debuts as Sophie in Der Rosenkavalier by R. Strauss at the Opernhaus Zürich and as Nannetta in Verdi's Falstaff at the Vienna State Opera.
