= Rafael Rojas (tenor) =

Mexican tenor opera singer (1962–2022)

Rafael Rojas (15 September 1962 – 18 January 2022) was a Mexican tenor opera singer, who won the Domingo Prize at the 1995 Operalia Competition, and was later critically acclaimed for his performances of Puccini and Verdi.

== Biography ==
Rojas was born in Guadalajara on 15 September 1962. He studied at the University of Guadalajara, and subsequently studied opera at the Royal Scottish Academy of Music and Drama‚ before moving to the Royal Northern College of Music, where he studied between 1992 and 1994. As a student he performed the role of Rodolfo in the British Youth Opera’s production of La Bohème.

In 1995 he entered the Operalia Competition and was awarded the Domingo Prize, which resulted in him being invited to perform El Gato Montes at the Washington National Opera. He sang in other prestigious houses, including at the Seattle Opera and at Boston Opera House.

In 1999 he made his European professional debut, performing at Bregenz Festival as Gustavo in Un Ballo in Maschera. He later performed at venues across the continent, including the Deutsche Oper Berlin, Welsh National Opera, Oper Leipzig, Oper Saarbrücken and Oper Graz. He also performed in Australia and New Zealand. He also performed across the United Kingdom, and made his debut at Opera North in 2002, performing the role of Cavaradossi in Tosca.

During his career he built his reputation on critically acclaimed performances of works by Puccini and Verdi. He founded and sponsored the Guadalajara Youth Symphony Orchestra.

Rojas died at his home in Mexico on 19 January 2022, at the age of 59. He had been ill for two months prior.
