= Xabier Anduaga =

Spanish operatic tenor

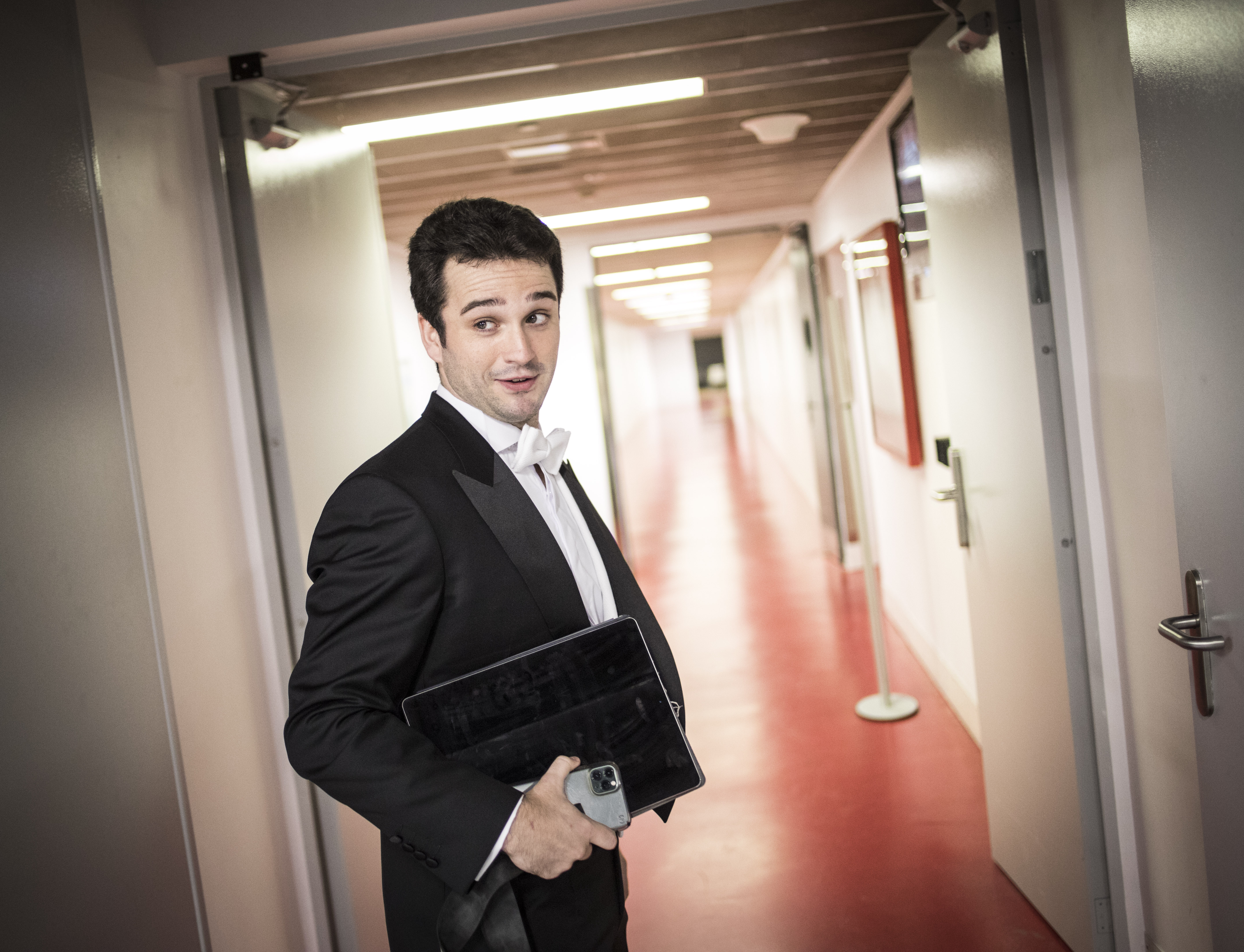
Xabier Anduaga, 2020

Xabier Anduaga is a Spanish operatic tenor. He was both joint first prize winner of the Operalia competition held in Prague in 2019 and joint recipient of the prize for zarzuela there.

== Biography ==
Xabier Anduaga was born in 1995 in San Sebastián, Spain and studied at the Musikene College of Music. In 2016 he participated in the Accademia Rossiniana in Pesaro where he appeared in the featured role of Cavalier Belfiore in Rossini's opera Il viaggio a Reims. He made his professional debut in staged opera at the Teatro Arriaga, Bilbao as the Prince in Rossini's La Cenerentola in 2016. He subsequently appeared in Rossini's Le siège de Corinthe and other roles at the Rossini Opera Festival Anduaga has performed the leading role of the Conte Almaviva in Il Barbiere di Siviglia of Rossini in St. Petersburg, Rouen, Beijing, Parma, Paris and Naples. On 14 April 2023, Anduaga made his house debut at the Metropolitan Opera as Nemorino in L'Elisir d'Amore and on 23 February 2024 as Ernesto in Don Pasquale at the Vienna State Opera.
