= Julia Novikova (soprano) =

Russian coloratura soprano (born 1983)

- Юлия Борисовна Новикова
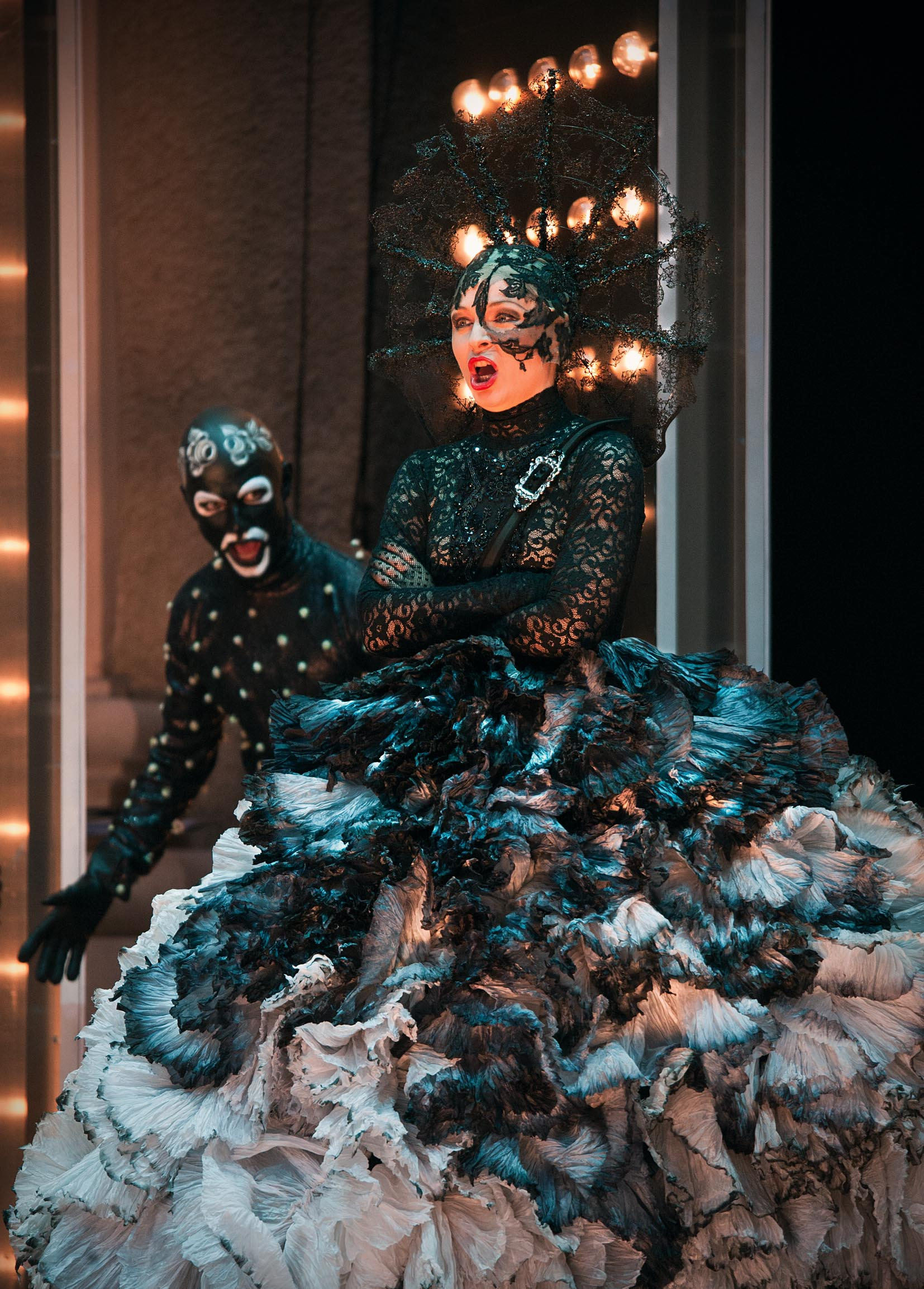
- Novikova performing at the 2012 Salzburg Festival
- Born: Julia Borisovna Novikova; 5 October 1983 (age 43); Leningrad, Russian SFSR, Soviet Union
- Education: Saint Petersburg Conservatory
- Occupation: Coloratura soprano
- Years active: 2000s–present
- Style: Opera
- Website: julianovikova.com

Julia Borisovna Novikova (Russian: Юлия Борисовна Новикова; born 5 October 1983) is a Russian coloratura soprano.

She was born in Leningrad. As a child, her parent took her to see performances at the Mariinsky Theatre. In 2006, she graduated from Saint Petersburg Conservatory, having studied opera singing under Professor Olga Kondina.

She garnered international attention after performing in the 2010 RADA film production of Verdi's Rigoletto a Mantova, opposite Plácido Domingo. The production was conducted by Zubin Mehta and televised live in 148 countries.

== Awards ==
- 2006: Wilhelm Stenhammar International Music Competition, Sweden
- 2007: Concours de Geneve, Switzerland and Neue Stimmen, Germany
- 2008: Emmerich Smola Förderpreis – in the context of Musikdebüt project of SWR Fernsehen
- 2009: Operalia – First Prize for best female voice, Audience Prize winner, Budapest
