= Arturo Chacón Cruz =

Mexican tenor

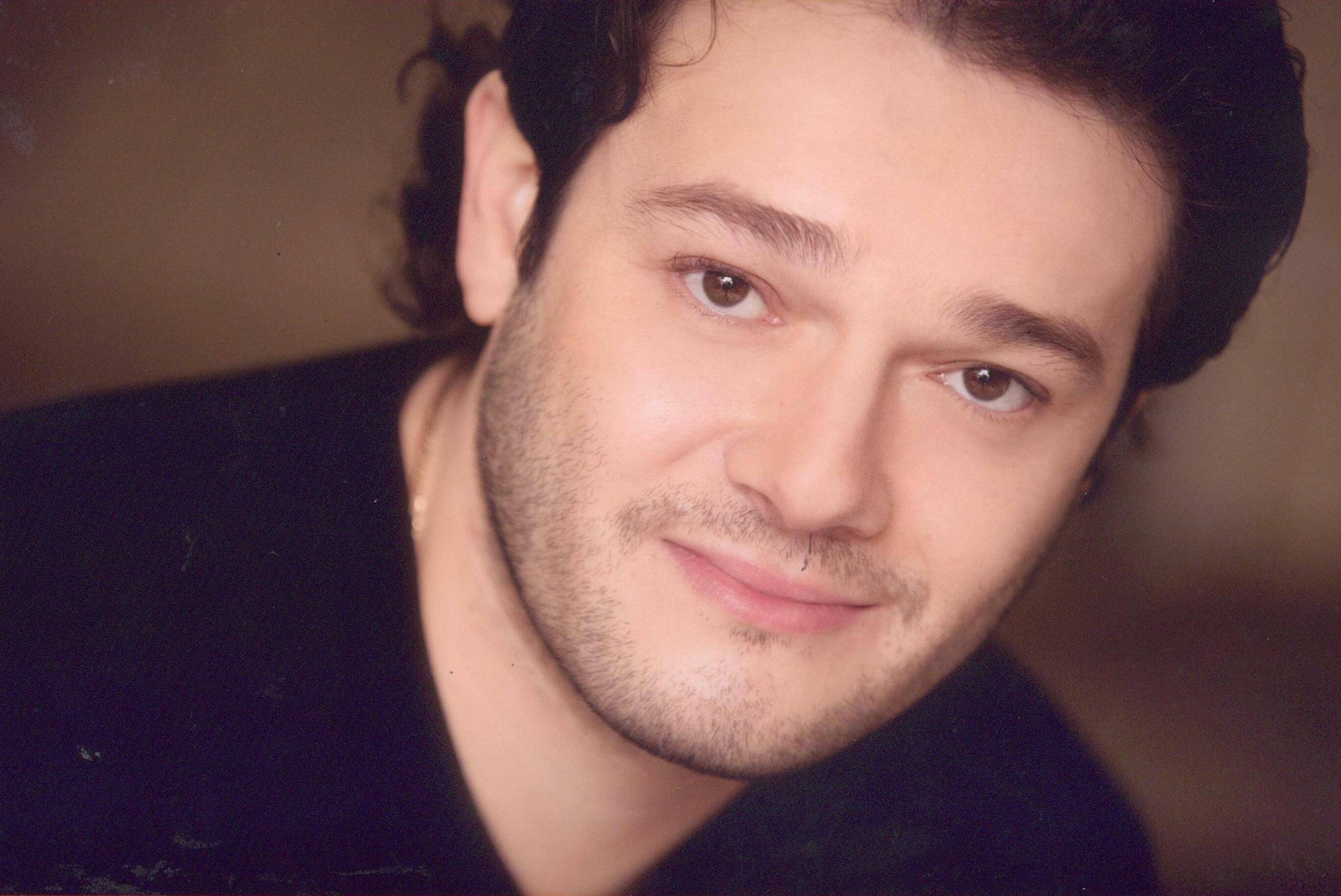
Arturo Chacón-Cruz

Arturo Chacón Cruz (August 20, 1977) is a Mexican American operatic tenor. A winner of the Operalia competition in 2005, he went on to sing leading roles at many North American opera theatres, including The Metropolitan Opera, Los Angeles Opera, Washington National Opera, San Francisco Opera, Carnegie Hall, and Houston Grand Opera. He has also appeared in many European opera houses, including the Teatro Real in Madrid, La Fenice in Venice, Bolshoi Theatre, Arena di Verona, Teatro alla Scala, the Theater an der Wien in Vienna and the Berlin State Opera.

== Career ==
Arturo Chacón-Cruz (August 20, 1977), hailing from Sonora, Mexico, is considered one of the foremost operatic tenors of his generation. He has established himself as a leading man, gracing the most renowned theaters and concert halls worldwide. Arturo's repertoire boasts over 60 roles performed in 30 countries. He has had the honor of delivering private recitals for Their Majesties Queen Sofia and King Juan Carlos of Spain, as well as a concert for all the leaders of Iberoamerica and His Majesty King Felipe of Spain. Arturo has been featured on major news and entertainment outlets, including CNN, FOX, Telemundo, Univision, TV Azteca, Televisa, Vanity Fair, GQ, Esquire, Opera News, People, and more.

Noteworthy performances include: The Duke in "Rigoletto" (Houston, Verona, Mexico City, Napoli, Budapest, Hamburg, Strasbourg, Aix en Provence, San Francisco, Verona, Brussels, Los Angeles, Florence) Rodolfo in "La Boheme" (San Francisco, Los Angeles, Washington D.C., Miami, Munich, Stockholm, Graz, Cologne, Hamburg, Las Palmas, Bordeaux, etc.) Alfredo in "La Traviata" (Seville, Beijing, Munich, Valencia, Moscow, Rome, Barcelona, Padova, Mexico City, Washington D.C., Detroit, Los Angeles, Verona, Oman) Ruggero in Puccini's "La Rondine" (Genova, Venice, Detroit, Zagreb) Hoffmann in Offenbach's "The Tales of Hoffmann" (Turin, Vienna, Milan, Malmo, Munich, Las Palmas, Tokyo, Nagoya, Moscow) Faust in Berlioz's "La Damnation de Faust" (Mexico City's Bellas Artes, Teatro Colón in Buenos Aires, Bolshoi Theater in Moscow) Verdi Requiem (Mexico City, Los Angeles, Guadalajara, San Sebastián, Ljubljana, Miami, Denver) Werther (Barcelona, Lyon, Moscow, Budapest, Stuttgart) Des Grieux in Massenet's "Manon" (Monte-Carlo, Mexico City) Don Jose in "Carmen" (Hamburg, Tel Aviv, Parma, Lyon, Tampere, Palermo, Zurich, Liege) Jacopo in "I Due Foscari" (Vienna, Munich, Paris) Macduff in Verdi's "Macbeth" (Los Angeles, Vienna, Verona)

Arturo has also collaborated with acclaimed film directors Sofia Coppola ("La Traviata," featuring exclusive Valentino Garavani designed costumes) and Woody Allen ("Gianni Schicchi," available on DVD and Blu-ray by Sony). These productions received international acclaim with sold-out performances in Los Angeles, Valencia, and Rome.

In his 2022/2023 season, Arturo was seen in a concert on the steps of the Lincoln Memorial with the new Italian/American music outreach company "Opera Italiana is in the Air." He presented a Zarzuela concert at the Vienna State Opera and took on the role of Gabriele Adorno in "Simon Boccanegra" at Palermo's Teatro Massimo di Palermo, the same theater seen in "The Godfather 3." Additionally, he sang in a Zarzuela concert conducted by Placido Domingo in the same historic Sicilian venue.

Other recent appearances include Manrico in "Il Trovatore" in San Francisco Opera, Hoffmann in "The Tales of Hoffmann" in Las Palmas de Gran Canaria, Oronte in Verdi's "I Lombardi" in Montecarlo, Jacopo Foscari in Verdi's "I due Foscari" in Paris, and the title role in Verdi's "Don Carlo" with the Maryland Lyric Opera at the prestigious Strathmore Hall. He reprised one of his signature roles, the eponymous role in Massenet's "Werther" at Stuttgart's State Opera. Arturo portrayed Edgardo di Ravenswood in Simon Stone's production of "Lucia di Lammermoor" in Los Angeles, Riccardo in Verdi's "Un Ballo in Maschera" in Maryland, Cavaradossi in "Tosca" with Florida Grand Opera in Miami and Fort Lauderdale (offering a historic "Bis" for "E lucevan le stelle" during their 4th performance).

On November 17, 2024, Arturo stepped into the role of Manrico in the Metropolitan Opera's production of Il trovatore midway through the performance, as tenor Michael Fabiano had fallen ill.

Upcoming performances include "Un Ballo in Maschera" in Barcelona, "La Bohéme" in Las Palmas and in Bordeaux, "Carmen" in Liege, among many more.

Recordings: In addition to his extensive operatic discography, Arturo released his first solo album, "Arturo Chacón le canta a México," featuring some of the most beautiful Mexican music ever written, accompanied by the Orquesta Filarmónica de Sonora. Arturo's Mariachi recordings, "De México para el Mundo" and "De mi Casa a tu Casa," were recently released, including a duet with his wife, Venetia-Maria Stelliou. His first-ever English language recording, "A Christmas Wonderland," was released in 2021 and is available on all digital platforms, as well as physically on Amazon. Recent releases include singles such as "Can't Help Falling in Love," "Let It Be," "Hallelujah," "Volver," "Cien Años," "Gracias a la Vida," and "Caruso." They are all available on digital platforms like iTunes, Spotify, Apple Music, Amazon Music, YouTube, and more.

Early Life and Education: In his late teens, before committing to a full-time artistic career, Arturo pursued a degree in Industrial and Mechanical Engineering. He spent six semesters in his native Sonora, Mexico, alternating between mathematics and physics and taking private operatic voice lessons, all while performing with Mariachis on the weekends. In 1998, he decided to fully devote himself to a bachelor's degree in Voice Performance and Arts at the University of Sonora. On his fifth semester, he received a full scholarship, eventually the Placido Domingo scholarship, to attend the SIVAM foundation workshops at the Escuela Superior de Música in Mexico City. There, he spent three years working with top teachers and coaches from Mexico, Italy, and the Metropolitan Opera, while performing in various concerts and operas throughout Mexico and Greece. In the fall of 2001, he received a full scholarship to pursue a Performance Diploma at Boston University's Opera Institute, graduating in 2003. He then participated in San Francisco Opera's Merola Young Artists program (2003) and the Houston Grand Opera Studio (2003–2005), where he spent two years studying and performing leading and supporting roles on the main stage of HGO.

Arturo's "big break" came in 2005 when he won the prestigious "Operalia" competition in Madrid, garnering the attention of many major figures in the opera world. This marked the launch of a successful international career.

Mentorship: Arturo serves as a mentor to aspiring young singers, aiming to pass on the valuable lessons and experiences he gained during his own early career. He has been a guest teacher at several institutions such as: Peabody Conservatory, Boston University, EOBA, San Francisco Opera's Adler Program, New World School for the Arts, in Miami, to name a few.

Passions, Giving Back, and Family: Among Arturo's other passions is languages. He is fluent in Spanish, English, Italian, and French, and continues to study German, Portuguese, Russian, and Greek.

Arturo is a spokesperson for Beyond Celiac, an organization dedicated to finding a cure for Celiac Disease.

Since 2017, he has been a brand ambassador for Tommy Hilfiger’s formal attire.

In 2010, Arturo became a US Citizen through the "Einstein Exceptional Ability Green Card" granted to him in 2005.

When he's not on the road, Arturo resides in Miami with his wife, Venetia, and their son, Stephen Arturo.

== Reception ==
Chacón Cruz has received many awards, including the Antonio Davalos Award in Mexico's Carlo Morelli's competition, first place and the Audience Choice Award at the 2003 Eleanor McCollum Competition in Houston Grand Opera, winner of Metropolitan Opera National Council Auditions in the New England Region, Plácido Domingo's Operalia 2005. He was also the recipient of the Ramón Vargas Opera Grant given by Vargas and Pro Ópera in Mexico. In 2006, he was named Artist of the Year by El Imparcial Cultural Organization in his hometown of Hermosillo, Mexico. Most recently he received the Moncayo Medal in Guadalajara, he was GQ Magazine Mexico “Man of the Year” for Classical Music Award recipient in 2018, San Francisco Opera Manetti-Shrem Emerging Star Award in 2017.

He has been acclaimed for his portrayal of Rodolfo in La Bohème, due to the youthfulness, beauty, and power of his voice, as well as his sincere interpretation of the role.

== Repertoire ==
Some of his tenor roles include:

- Manrico in Verdi's Il trovatore,
- Arcadio in Daniel Catán's Florencia en el Amazonas,
- Rodolfo in La bohème,
- Pinkerton in Madama Butterfly,
- Rinuccio in Gianni Schicchi,
- Ruggero in La Rondine,
- Lensky in Tchaikovsky's Eugene Onegin,
- Alfredo in La traviata,
- Il Duca di Mantova in Verdi's Rigoletto,
- The Tenor solo in the Verdi Requiem,
- Romeo and Faust in Gounod's Roméo et Juliette and Faust,
- Christian in Alfano's Cyrano de Bergerac,
- The title role in Mozart's Idomeneo,
- Tamino in The Magic Flute,
- Marcello di Bruges in Donizetti's Il duca d'Alba,
- Nemorino in Gaetano Donizetti's l'Elisir d'Amore,
- Des Grieux in Massenet's Manon,
- the title role in Werther,
- the title role in Les Contes d'Hoffmann,
- Uriel in Haydn's The Creation,
- Sir Edgardo di Ravenswood in Lucia de Lammermoor,
- Captain Kirk in the premiere performance of The Wrath of Kahn

== Venues ==
- Teatro alla Scala, Milano
- Washington National Opera,
- Houston Grand Opera,
- National Centre for the Performing Arts, Beijing, China,
- Opera Pacific,
- Berlin Staatsoper Unter den Linden,
- Detroit Opera,
- The Keller Auditorium with The Portland Opera,
- Los Angeles Opera,
- Grazer Oper, Austria,
- Oper Köln, Germany,
- Hamburgische Staatsoper, Hamburg, Germany,
- Teatro Comunale di Bologna,
- Teatro di San Carlo,
- Connecticut Opera,
- Cincinnati Opera,
- Palau de les Arts Reina Sofía, Spain,
- Palacio de Bellas Artes, in Mexico,
- Teatro de la Ciudad, in Mexico City,
- Sala Nezahualcoyotl, in Mexico City,
- Teatro Real in Madrid,
- Teatro La Fenice in Venice,
- Teatro Regio di Torino, in Turin,
- Vatroslav Lisinski Concert Hall, Zagreb, Croatia,
- Opéra National de Montpellier and Festival de Radio France,
- the National Theatre of Miskolc in Hungary,
- Carnegie Hall, New York City,
- the Mormon Tabernacle Choir in Salt Lake City,
- Le Corum: Montpellier France,
- Opera de Lyon, Lyon, France,
- Opera Royal de Wallonie, Liege, Belgium,
- National Centre for the Performing Arts (China),
- Aichi Triennale Festival, Nagoya, Japan
- Teatro Campoamor, Oviedo, España

== Recordings ==
- Marcello di Bruges, "Il duca d'Alba"
- Christian, Cyrano de Bergerac, DVD Release by Naxos Records
- Featured in Renée Fleming's Verismo CD
- A Christmas Wonderland CD
- De México Para El Mundo CD
- Arturo Chacon Le Canta A México CD
- De Mi Casa A Tu Casa CD
- Hallelujah Leonard Cohen (Cover, Single)

== Philanthropy ==
Since 2018, Chacón Cruz has served as the ambassador for Beyond Celiac, formerly known as the National Foundation of Celiac Awareness, to help spread awareness about celiac disease. He performed at their 2019 Gala.
