= Baltasar Anduaga y Espinosa =

Baltasar Anduaga y Espinosa (1817–1861) was a Spanish politician, jurist, writer and translator.

He held public office three times, and published legal, historical, and literary books. He translated and edited the works of Jeremy Bentham in fourteen volumes between 1841 and 1843, as well as the two volume Una Historia Constitucional de la Monarquía Española (A Constitutional History of the Spanish Monarchy) by Frenchman Victor du Hamel, published in France in 1845. His narrative works include the novel Elodio y Adolfo (Madrid, 1847), Laura (Madrid, 1847), Isaac Laquedeen, a six-part melodrama published in La Época, and Los caballeros del firmamento (Knights of the Sky), in two volumes.
