= Virginia Tola =

Argentine operatic soprano

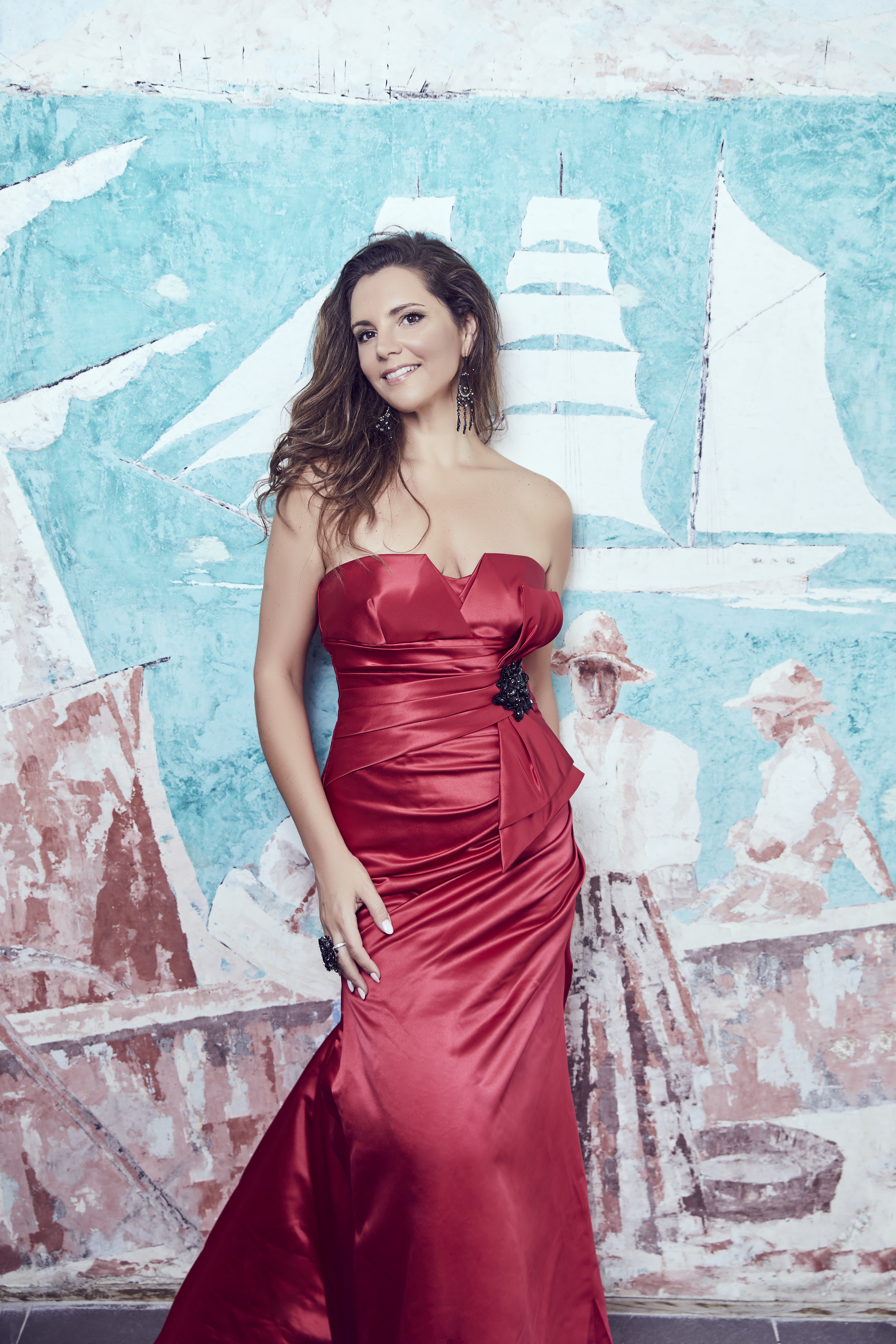
Tola Diva (2018)

Virginia Tola (born 1976) is an Argentine operatic soprano. While studying music at the Teatro Colón in Buenos Aires, she won first prize in Oslo at the Queen Sonja International Music Competition in 1999. She made her début at the Teatro Colón as Antonia in The Tales of Hoffmann. Tola has taken leading roles in operas across Europe and in the United States. She has also performed internationally in concerts, including several appearances with Placido Domingo.

== Biography ==
Born on 15 January 1976 in Santo Tomé, Santa Fe, Virginia Tola attended local schools. When she was eight, she took part in the Santa Fe municipal choir. She completed her training at the Teatro Colón Art Institute under Ana Sirulnik and Gustavo Valerio. Thanks to a study grant, she was able to study voice further under Guillermo Opitz.

In the 1990s, two events were to influence Tola's future. Pope John Paul II was impressed by her voice at a meeting of Spanish-speaking delegates in early 1995. In 1999, Tola won first prize at the Queen Sonja International Music Competition in Norway. Thereafter she performed in theatres throughout Norway.

In 1998, she participated in the world première of J. Deforenzi's orchestral version of Paráfasis. She appeared at the Teatro Colón in the première of Juan Carlos Zorzi's Don Juan. She went on to perform in Rome, Los Angeles, Madrid, Amsterdam and Brussels, singing leading roles in operas including The Marriage of Figaro, Cosi fan Tutte, La Traviata, La Bohème, Carmen and Nabucco.
