= Contextual =

Contextual may refer to:

- Contextual advertising, advertisements based on other content displayed
- Contextual deep linking, links that bring users to content in mobile apps regardless of whether or not they had the app previously installed
- Contextual design, user-centered design process developed by Hugh Beyer and Karen Holtzblatt
- Contextual inquiry, user-centered design method, part of the contextual design methodology
- Contextual learning, learning outside the classroom
- Contextual theatre, form of theatre
- Comparative contextual analysis, methodology for comparative research

== See also ==
- Context (disambiguation)
- Contextualization (disambiguation)
