= The Context =

The Context may refer to:

- The alternate title of Illustrious Corpses (1976)
- The Context (TV programme), a current affairs show on BBC News

== See also ==
- Context (disambiguation)
