= Buried Seeds =

2019 American documentary film

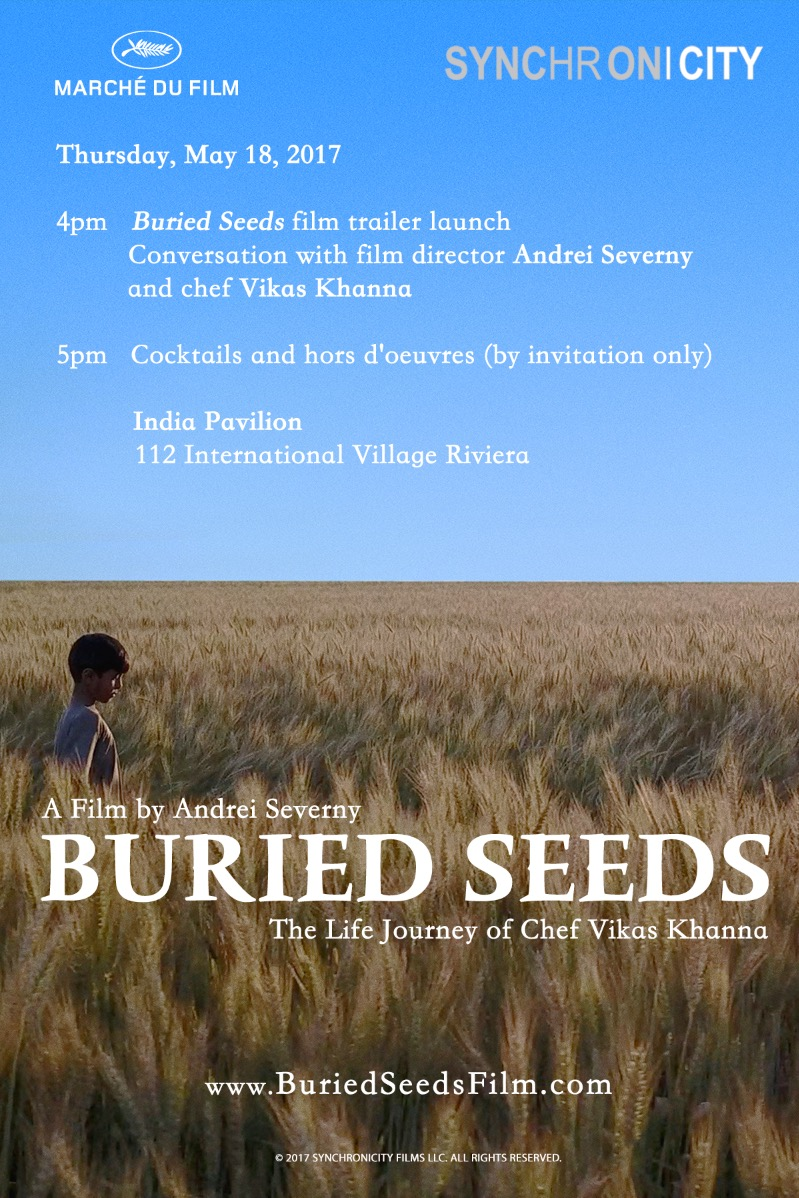
- Trailer release poster at the Cannes Film Festival 2017
- Directed by: Andrei Severny
- Starring: Vikas Khanna
- Cinematography: Andrei Severny, Antonio Pacheco, Rohit Gaonkar, Stephen Cardone, Lourdes Severny
- Edited by: Andrei Severny, Stephen Cardone
- Release date: July 13, 2019 (Germany)
- Country: United States
- Language: English

Buried Seeds is a documentary film, directed by Andrei Severny based on the life journey of Michelin Starred Indian Chef Vikas Khanna.

== Synopsis ==
Buried Seeds is a timeless story of struggle, passion, willpower, failure and rise shown through Vikas Khanna’s eyes. It recreates his childhood, finding comfort in his grandmother's kitchen and follows the journey of an immigrant enduring overwhelming obstacles and pain in achieving his dreams."

== Trailer ==
The trailer of the film was released by Andrei Severny and Vikas Khanna at the 70th Cannes Film Festival.

== Film locations ==
The documentary has been filmed in Amritsar, Vikas's hometown in India, Manipal, where he received formal training in Hotel management and New York, where he currently resides.

== Crew ==
The film is directed by Andrei Severny, produced by Pooja Kohli, co-produced by Jitendra Mishra and edited by Andrei Severny and Stephen Cardone. Cinematographers were Andrei Severny, Antonio Pacheco, Rohit Gaonkar, Stephen Cardone, Lourdes Severny

== Screening ==
The documentary was screened at a special preview screening at the Venice Film Festival 2017 on 6 September, which was complemented by a dinner curated by Khanna himself based on the theme 'Celebrating India'.

== TV Premiere and streaming ==
Buried Seeds' TV premiere was on National Geographic on August 15, 2021. The film is currently available on Disney+ Hotstar.
