= Inge Druckrey =

German-born American graphic designer

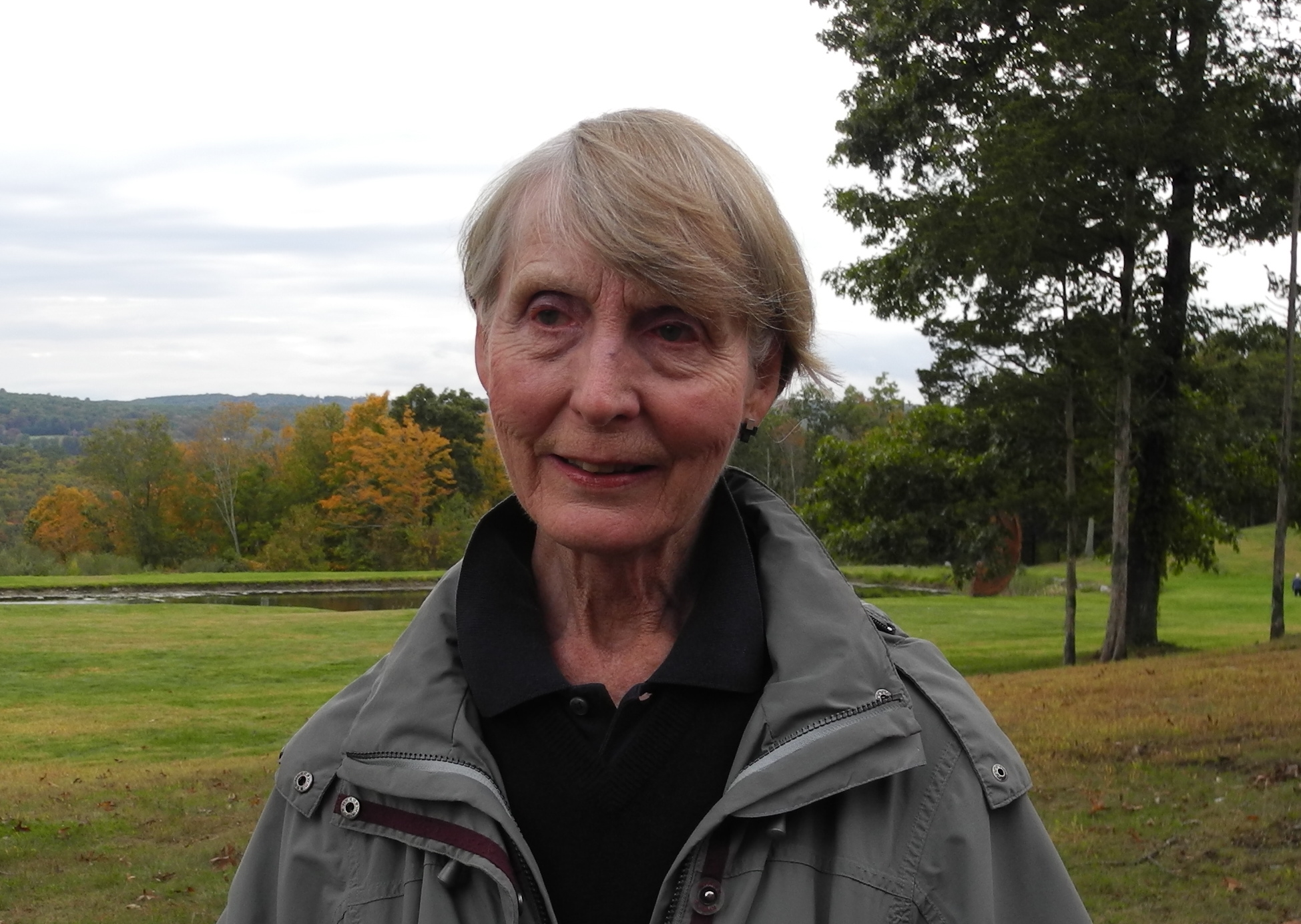
- Inge Druckrey in 2012
- Born: 1940 (age 85–86); Berlin, Germany
- Education: University of Basel
- Occupations: Designer, teacher
- Known for: Graphic design
- Spouse: Edward Tufte

Inge Druckrey (born 1940 in Germany) is a German-born American designer and educator, who brought the Swiss school of design to the United States. She taught at Yale University, Rhode Island School of Design, University of Hartford, Philadelphia College of Art, Kunstgewerbeschule in Krefeld, The University of the Arts, Kansas City Art Institute. She is Professor Emerita of Graphic Design, University of the Arts.

== Biography ==
Inge Druckrey was born in 1940, in Berlin, Germany. Druckrey received her state diploma in Graphic Design from the Kunstgewerbeschule Basel (now Schule für Gestaltung Basel), Switzerland in 1965. Her education included studies in art history and languages at the University of Basel.

From 1965 to 1966, she was a designer at the Agency Halpern in Zürich, Switzerland.

She lives in Cheshire, Connecticut with her husband, political scientist and theorist of information design Edward Tufte.

== Work ==
In 1966–1968, Druckrey taught at the Kansas City Art Institute; from 1968–1970, at the Werkkunstschule in Krefeld, Germany; from 1971–1973, at Philadelphia College of Art; from 1973–1995, at Yale School of Art; from 1984–1985, part-time at University of Hartford; from 1987–1994, (as visiting critic) at Rhode Island School of Design; from 1994–2010 at University of the Arts. In 2007 Inge Druckrey was awarded the Mary Louise Beitzel Award for Distinguished Teaching.

Druckrey has done free-lance work for European and American clients including Scholastic Inc., the Schoenberg Institute, IBM, New Jersey Transit, the University of Hartford, the Council on Resident Education in Obstetrics and Gynecology, the University of Pennsylvania, Yale University, and the Porcelain Manufactory Fuerstenberg, Germany. Her work has been published in Graphis, Industrial Design, Design Quarterly, The 20th Century Poster, The Thames & Hudson Encyclopedia of Graphic Design and Designers, Graphic Design-World Views (Icograda), and is included in the permanent collection at the Museum of Modern Art, Cooper-Hewitt, National Design Museum and Museum für Gestaltung.

In 2012 Andrei Severny made a documentary film about Druckrey's work called Teaching to See. The film was produced by Edward Tufte.

== Publications ==
- Inge Druckrey,“Learning from Historical Sources,” Spirals 91, (Graphic Design Department, Rhode Island School of Design, Fall 1992), 121–128.
- H.U. Allemann, Inge Druckrey, Basic Design, Limited Edition Publication, (Kansas City Art Institute, 1968)
- Inge Druckrey,“Signs,” Design Quarterly 92, (Walker Art Center, Minneapolis, Minnesota, 1974)
- Inge Druckrey,"Modern Pioneers in Typography and Design: Anna Simons, Edward Johnston, Rudolf von Larisch, F. H. Ehmcke" (Graphics Press, LLC, April 2024)

== Exhibitions ==
- 30 Years of Poster Art, Gewerbemuseum Basel, Switzerland, 1983.
- The 20th Century Poster, Design of the Avant-Garde, Walker Art Center, Minneapolis, 1985.
- The Basel School of Design and its Philosophy: The Armin Hofmann Years, Moore College of Art and Design, Rhode Island School of Design, Virginia Commonwealth University, 1986.
- The Modern Poster, The Museum of Modern Art, New York, 1988.
- Universal/Unique, 31 Graphic Design Educators, the University of the Arts (Philadelphia), the Herb Lubalin Study Center, Cooper-Hewitt, National Design Museum, New York, 1989.
- Graphic Design in America, Walker Art Center, IBM Gallery of Science and Art, The Phoenix Art Museum, Design Museum at Butlers Wharf in London, 1989.
- UArts Faculty Work, Rosenwald-Wolf and Hamilton Galleries, The University of the Arts (Philadelphia), 2001.
