= Condition (film) =

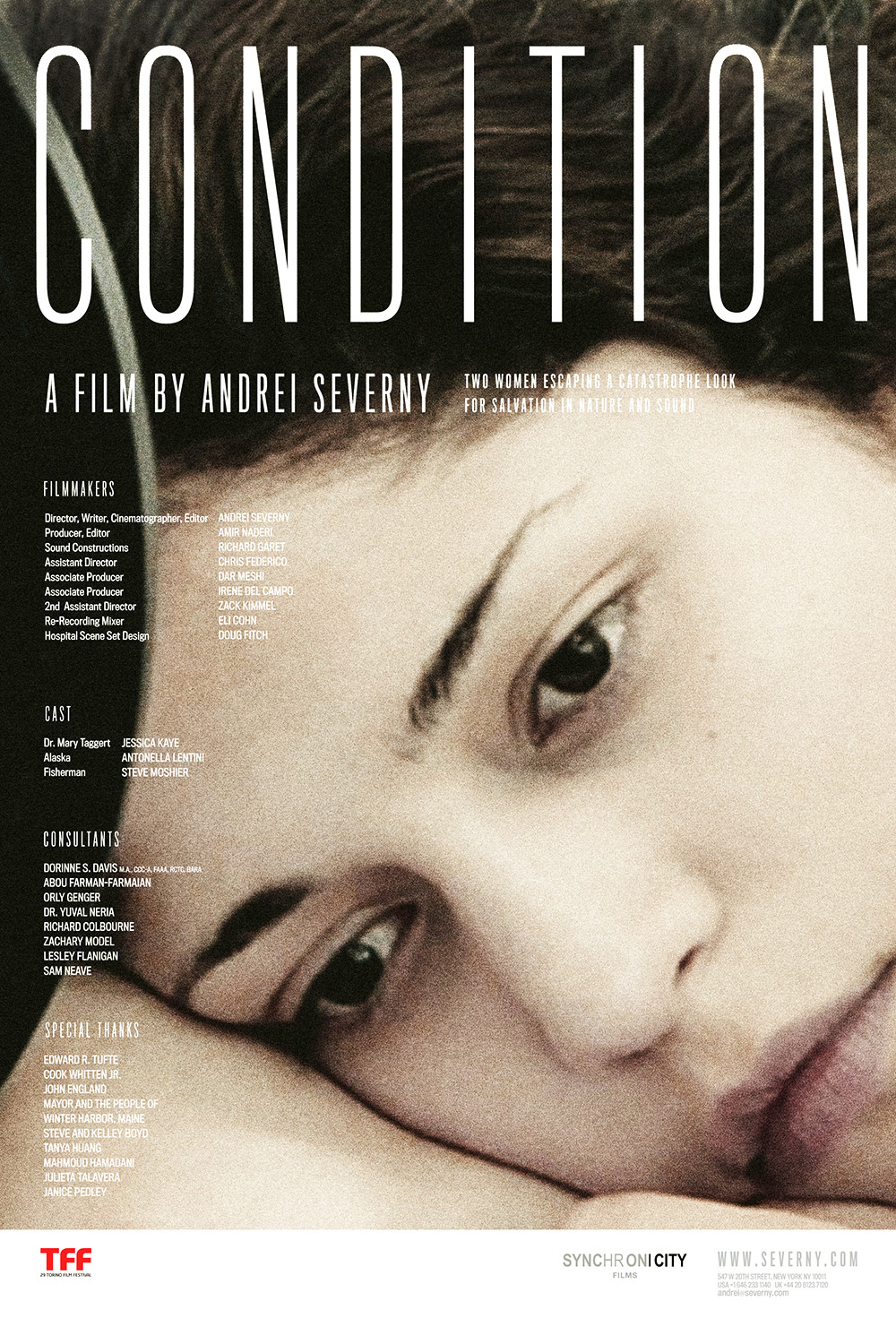
- Directed by: Andrei Severny
- Written by: Andrei Severny
- Produced by: Amir Naderi
- Starring: Jessica Kaye; Ella Lentini; Steve Moshier
- Cinematography: Andrei Severny
- Edited by: Amir Naderi; Andrei Severny
- Music by: Richard Garet
- Release date: November 28, 2011 (Torino Film Festival)
- Running time: 70 minutes
- Country: United States
- Language: English

Condition is a 2011 science fiction film, directed by Andrei Severny and produced by Amir Naderi. The film is a meditative psychological drama set in apocalyptic atmosphere. The story is a sensory battle of the two female characters: sound therapist Mary Taggert and her patient, a disturbed young woman named Alaska.

Condition features Ella Lentini (Alaska), Jessica Kaye (Dr. Mary Taggert), Steve Moshier (fisherman). Three excerpts from the sonic compositions by Richard Garet can be heard in the film: Winter, Subtracted and For Shimpei Takeda. No musical instruments were used in any of the sounds heard in Condition.

== Plot ==
The doctor evacuates with her patient, driving a car away from the city to unspecified northern territory towards the border. Having run out of gas, two women are stranded in mysterious rough and rocky wilderness close to the ocean where it becomes a battle for survival and a struggle with the inner wounds and salvation with sound and nature. The psychologically complex and slow narrative of Condition relies on sequences of abstract images that one could expect to see at a museum or gallery.

== Cast ==
- Ella Lentini as Alaska (credited as Antonella Lentini)
- Jessica Kaye as Dr. Mary Taggert
- Steve Moshier as Fisherman

== Reception ==
The film premiered at the 29th Torino Film Festival and was recognized by the Gandhi Glasses award. The film was shot on location in New York City and the northern shoreline of Maine.
