= Anna Netrebko =

Russian operatic soprano (born 1971)

- Анна Нетребко
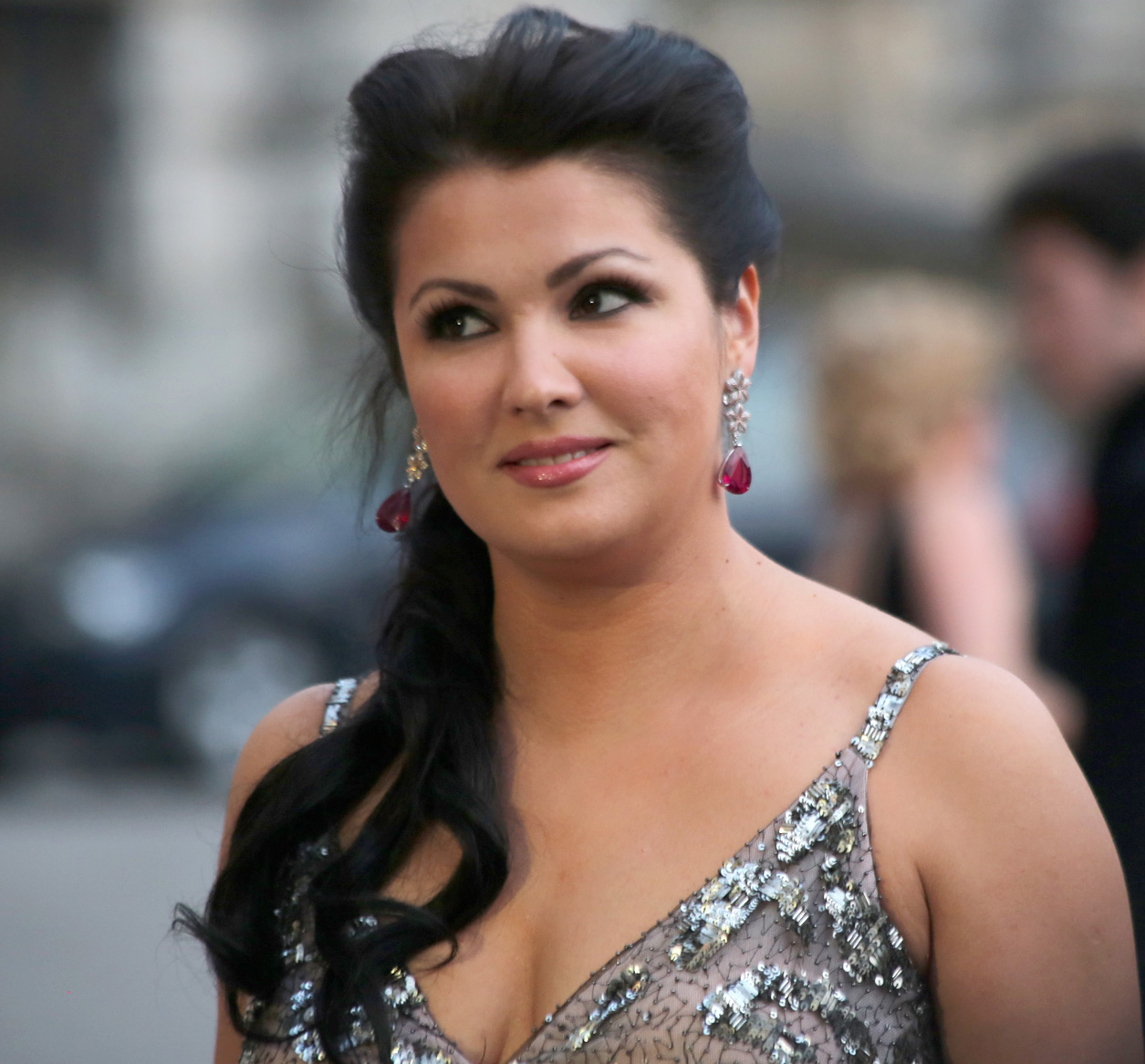
- Netrebko in 2013
- Born: 18 September 1971 (age 55); Krasnodar, Soviet Union
- Citizenship: Russia; Austria
- Education: Saint Petersburg Conservatory
- Occupation: Operatic soprano
- Years active: 1993–present
- Partner(s): Simone Alberghini (1999–2007); Erwin Schrott (2007–2013); Yusif Eyvazov (2014–2024)
- Children: 1
- Awards: State Prize of the Russian Federation; People's Artist of Russia; Kammersängerin
- Website: annanetrebko.com

Anna Yuryevna Netrebko (Russian: Анна Юрьевна Нетребко; born 18 September 1971) is a Russian operatic soprano who has performed at the Salzburg Festival, Metropolitan Opera, Vienna State Opera, the Royal Opera and La Scala.

Discovered and promoted by Valery Gergiev, she began her career at the Mariinsky Theatre, collaborating with the conductor in the theater and performances elsewhere. She was noticed globally after playing Donna Anna in Mozart's Don Giovanni at the 2002 Salzburg Festival. She had been known for her rendition of lyric and coloratura soprano roles, yet later proceeded into heavier 19th-century romantic roles, such as Leonora in Il trovatore and the role of Lady Macbeth in Macbeth. Since 2016, she has turned her focus to verismo repertoire.

She has been an exclusive artist for Deutsche Grammophon since 2003. She has won multiple Echo Klassik Awards, and was included on the Time 100 list in 2007. She was named a People's Artist of Russia in 2008, and an Austrian Kammersängerin in 2017.

== Early life and training ==
Netrebko was born in Krasnodar in a family of Kuban Cossack background. While studying at the Saint Petersburg Conservatory, Netrebko worked as a janitor at Saint Petersburg's Mariinsky Theatre. Later when she auditioned for the theatre, conductor Valery Gergiev, recognizing her from her prior work, subsequently became her vocal mentor.

== Career ==
=== Early career (1994–2001) ===
Under Gergiev's guidance, in 1994 Netrebko made her operatic stage debut at the Mariinsky at age 22 as Susanna in The Marriage of Figaro despite initially being billed as Barbarina. In the same year, she also performed as the Queen of the Night in Mozart's The Magic Flute with the Riga Independent Opera Avangarda Akadēmija under conductor David Milnes. She subsequently became associated with the Mariinsky Theatre.

In autumn 1995, Netrebko made her American debut with Lyudmila at the San Francisco Opera. Following this successful performance, she was enrolled in the Merola Opera Program in summer 1996 and became a frequent guest singer in San Francisco in the next seasons, performing in L'elisir d'amore (Adina), Betrothal in a Monastery, Idomeneo (Ilia), La bohème (Musetta), The Tsar's Bride (Marfa), Don Giovanni (Zerlina), Falstaff (Nannetta). In 1998, she performed Lyudmila when the Mariinsky production of the opera was presented at the Metropolitan Opera House, and made Salzburg Festival debut in Parsifal conducted by Gergiev. She sang her first Violetta in Verdi's La traviata in the same year in Saint Petersburg, and her first Amina in La sonnambula the following year. In October 1999, she performed Gilda in Rigoletto at the Washington National Opera.

=== Rise to fame (2002–2010) ===
Netrebko made her debut with the Metropolitan Opera company in February 2002, as Natasha in the Met premiere of Prokofiev's War and Peace, and performed as Giulietta in I Capuleti e i Montecchi at the Opera Company of Philadelphia. Her international breakthrough came in August 2002, when she sang Donna Anna in Don Giovanni conducted by Nikolaus Harnoncourt at the Salzburg Festival, where she would be particularly associated. In September 2002, she returned to the Royal Opera for Servilia in La clemenza di Tito, and in next two seasons for Don Giovanni and Rigoletto. She then returned to Washington National Opera for Ilia in Idomeneo. In 2003, she made her Vienna State Opera and Bavarian State Opera debuts, both with Violetta in La traviata. In November 2003, she made her Los Angeles Opera debut with Lucia di Lammermoor, and would return in 2005 for Roméo et Juliette and in 2006 for Manon.

In February 2004, she returned to Vienna for Don Giovanni, and was subsequently invited as the guest performer at the Vienna Opera Ball, where she returned in 2007. She then starred in a Japan tour of La bohème in Robert Carsen's staging as Musetta conducted by Seiji Ozawa, and subsequently returned to San Francisco Opera in the same role. After withdrawing from two engagements, citing exhaustion, she returned to scene in November in Metropolitan Opera's La bohème as Musetta. In summer 2005, she starred in the premiere of Willy Decker's new staging of La traviata in Salzburg, conducted by Carlo Rizzi. In December 2005, she sang Gilda in Rigoletto at the Metropolitan Opera, and was featured in the premiere of Otto Schenk's new production of Don Pasquale and Japan tour of Don Giovanni in the same season.

In 2006, she sang Susanna in the new Claus Guth production of The Marriage of Figaro in Salzburg.

She sang Elvira in I puritani at the Metropolitan Opera in January 2007, and on 30 May 2007, Netrebko made her Carnegie Hall debut with Dmitri Hvorostovsky and the Orchestra of St. Luke's, which was originally scheduled on 2 March 2006 but she postponed due to not feeling artistically ready. She then performed Donna Anna at Covent Garden, but withdrew from some performances due to illness. She appeared at the Last Night of the Proms on 8 September of that year where she performed excerpts from La sonnambula and Giuditta, and the lied "Morgen!" by Richard Strauss with Joshua Bell. In the fall of 2007 she reprised her role as Juliette in Roméo et Juliette at the Metropolitan Opera.

In December 2007 Netrebko was invited to honor Martin Scorsese at the 30th Annual Kennedy Center Honors, performing the aria "O mio babbino caro". Also in 2007, Time magazine placed her on its Time 100.

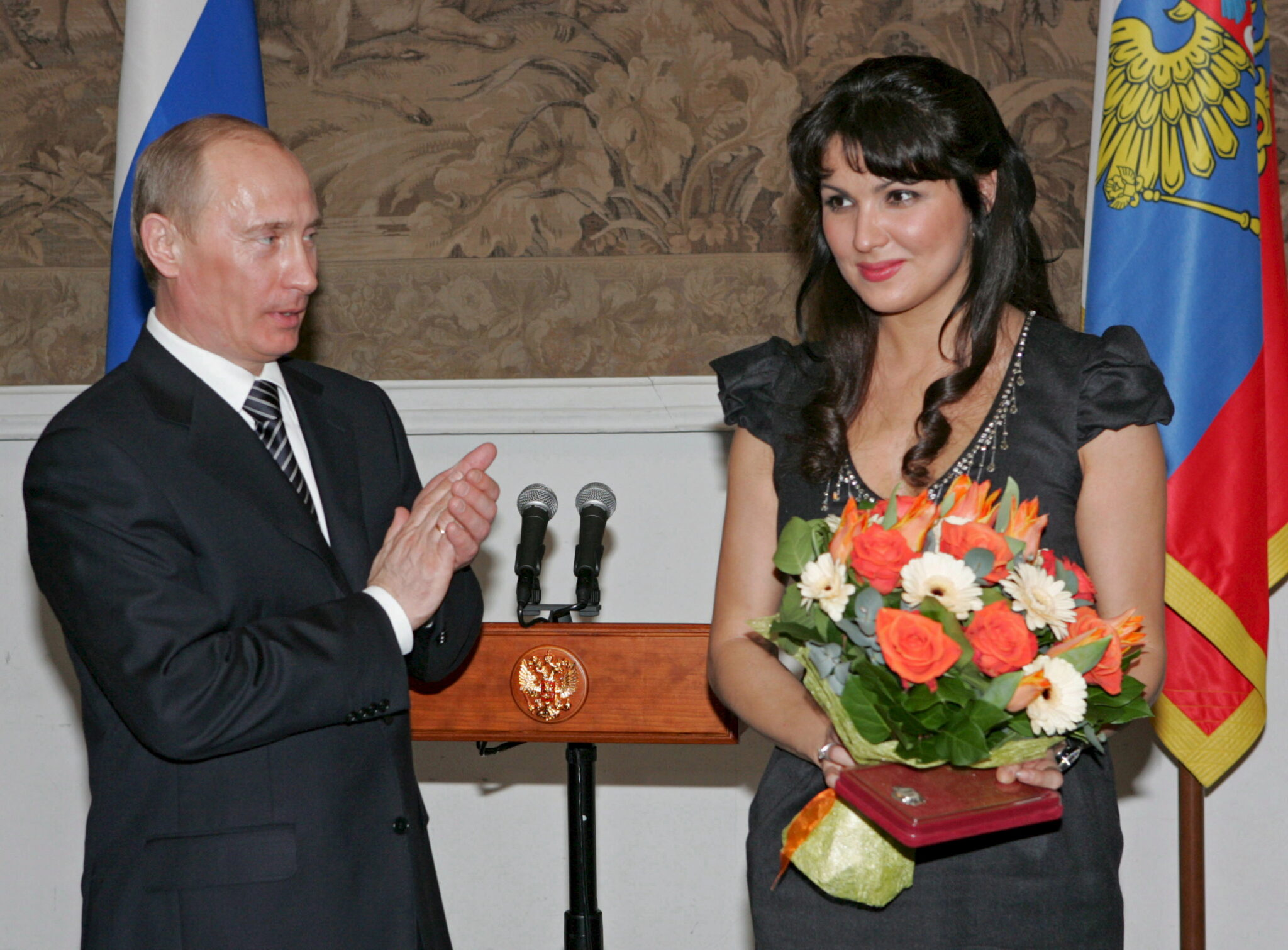
Netrebko and Vladimir Putin at the Mariinsky Theatre after receiving the honorary title of People's Artist of Russia in 2008

In January 2008 she performed Violetta at the Royal Opera House, Covent Garden to triumphant acclaim on the opening night, opposite Jonas Kaufmann and Dmitri Hvorostovsky in performances conducted by Maurizio Benini. However, she cancelled three subsequent performances due to suffering a bronchial condition. In May 2008, she made her Paris Opera debut in Bellini's I Capuleti e i Montecchi at the Opéra Bastille, with Joyce DiDonato as Romeo. In her first performance after her maternity leave, Netrebko sang Lucia in Lucia di Lammermoor when it opened at the Mariinsky Theatre in Saint Petersburg on 14 January 2009, in a production from the Scottish Opera led by John Doyle. She then sang the same role in January and February 2009 at the Metropolitan Opera. Netrebko appeared as Giulietta in I Capuleti e i Montecchi at the Royal Opera House in Spring 2009, and as Violetta in La traviata in June 2009 at the San Francisco Opera.

She presented the Deutscher Medienpreis 2009 to Chancellor Angela Merkel and sang Strauss' "Cäcilie" at the ceremony in Baden-Baden on 9 February 2010.

Through April and May 2010, she made a series of appearances at the Vienna State Opera in La bohème, Carmen, Manon. Originally scheduled in I puritani as well, she cancelled the appearance citing illness. She starred in Laurent Pelly's new Manon production at the Royal Opera, and sang Juliette at the Salzburg Festival. In October 2010, she returned to New York's Metropolitan Opera for Norina in Don Pasquale, the matinee performance on 13 November of which was broadcast nationwide by PBS.

=== Heavier roles (2011–2022) ===
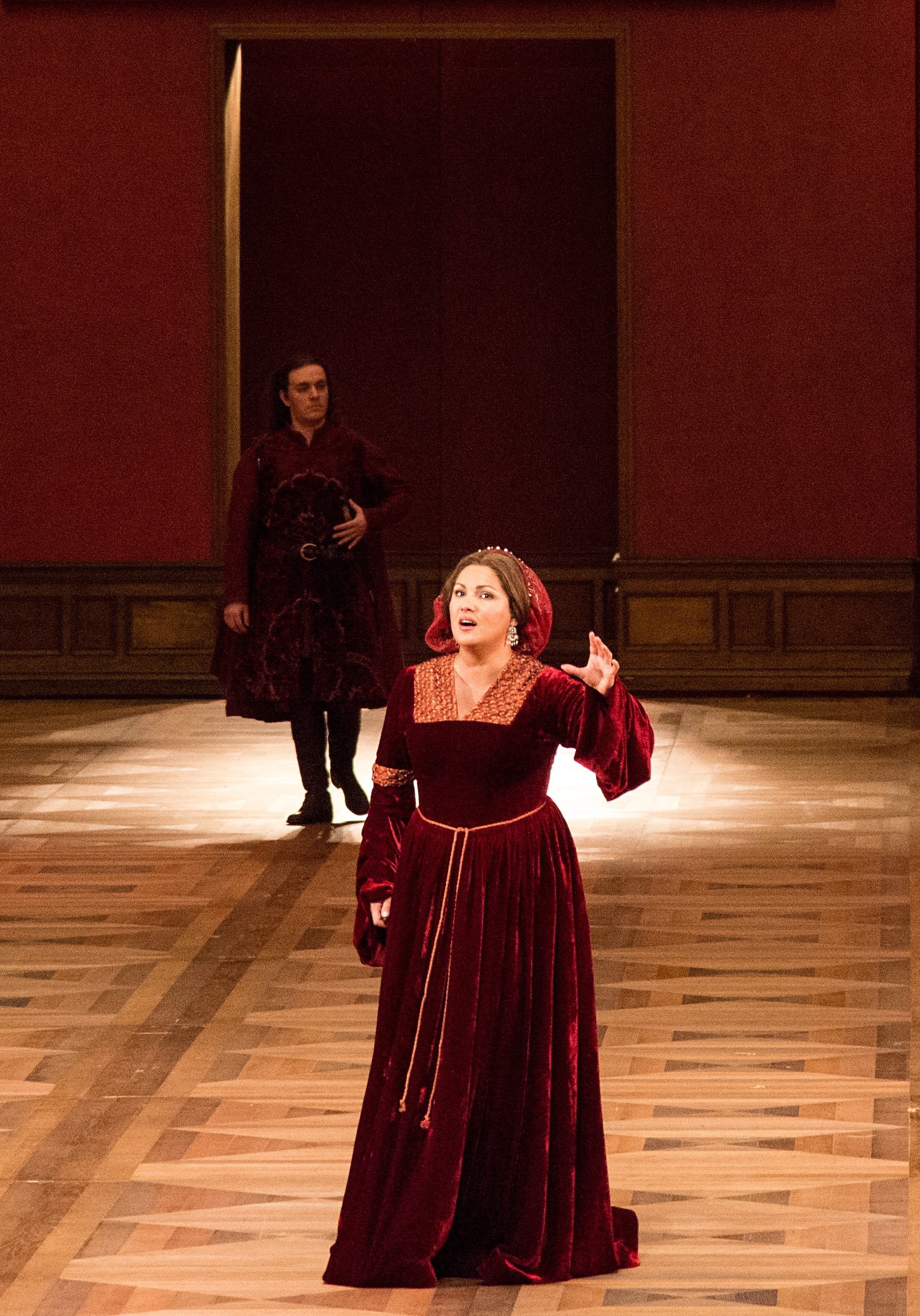
Netrebko as Leonora in Alvis Hermanis's production of Il trovatore at the Salzburg Festival 2014

On 2 April 2011, she sang the title role of Gaetano Donizetti's Anna Bolena at the Vienna State Opera for a sold-out premiere there, and the repeat performance on 5 April 2011 was broadcast live to cinemas around the world. On 7 December 2011, she opened the new season at La Scala in Milan, making her house debut, as Donna Anna in Don Giovanni. She has the distinction of being invited to appear in three consecutive opening night new productions at the Metropolitan Opera: Anna Bolena in 2011, L'elisir d'amore in 2012, and Eugene Onegin in 2013. Her performance as Lady Macbeth in the Metropolitan's 2014 fall season's production of Macbeth, a revival of Adrian Noble's 2007 production, drew critical praise and demonstrated her voice is still expanding in range and volume. She continued her expansion into heavier Verdi roles at the Met the following year, singing the role of Leonora in Il trovatore to acclaim from both critics and audiences.

In 2013, Netrebko was named in Paper's annual Beautiful People issue. She participated in the gala concert inaugurating the Mariinsky Theatre Second Stage on 2 May 2013. She was invited to perform the Olympic Anthem, in Russian, at the 2014 Winter Olympics opening ceremony.

In April 2016, Netrebko announced her withdrawal from productions of Bellini's Norma at the Royal Opera House's 2016/17 season and the Metropolitan Opera's 2017/18 season due to the change in her voice. The vacancies were filled respectively by Sonya Yoncheva and Sondra Radvanovsky. She then made her debut as Elsa in Lohengrin at the Semperoper in Dresden, and then went to Saint Petersburg for the same role at the Mariinsky Theatre.

She made several role debuts in 2017, including the title role of Adriana Lecouvreur at Mariinsky Theatre in June, the title role of Aida at Salzburg Festival in August, and Maddalena in Andrea Chénier at La Scala in December. In 2018, she debuted as Tosca at the Metropolitan Opera in April and performed at the Summer Night Concert Schönbrunn on 31 May.

In 2018, she performed in both gala concerts at the Red Square on 13 June and at the Bolshoi Theatre on 14 July, respectively commemorating the opening and closing of the 2018 FIFA World Cup. On 8 September 2018 she took part in the inauguration gala concert of Zaryadye Concert Hall in Moscow, which was streamed on Medici.tv. In February 2019, she opened the 2019 Vienna Opera Ball. She was featured in the opening ceremony of 2019 European Games in Minsk on 21 June and inaugurated the first concert season of the Congress Hall at the Yekaterinburg Expo on 30 August 2019.

In June 2020, Netrebko performed highlights from Verdi's Don Carlo in reduced concert form at the Semperoper as part of its "Aufklang!" series which reopened the theatre after the first COVID-19 lockdown in Germany. She went on debuting at the Teatro di San Carlo in Naples for semi-staged Tosca with Yusif Eyvazov and Ludovic Tézier. In September 2020 she had to self-isolate after her co-star in Don Carlo at the Bolshoi Theatre, Ildar Abdrazakov, was tested positive for COVID-19. She was soon hospitalized in Moscow, being treated for COVID-19-related pneumonia for about a week.

=== Boycott, March 2022 ===
On 26 February 2022, following the 2022 Russian invasion of Ukraine, Netrebko released a statement in which she voiced her opposition to the war but disagreed with forcing one to voice one's political opinion. Despite her statement, she faced pressure from performance institutions for failing to distance herself from Russian president Vladimir Putin. On 1 March 2022, she said she would "retire from concert life until further notice". Immediately prior to this announcement, she withdrew from opera productions in Milan and Zürich, while the Bavarian State Opera cancelled existing engagements with both her and Valery Gergiev. Two days later, the Metropolitan Opera removed her from the upcoming Turandot, replacing her with the Ukrainian Liudmyla Monastyrska in the title role, and from Don Carlos in the 2023 season. The Berlin State Opera and Festspielhaus Baden-Baden also cancelled her appearances, with the latter not ruling out future cooperation. Finn McRedmond of The Irish Times said that such a "wholesale boycott of Russia" would be "a dangerous departure from Western values".

On 30 March 2022, Netrebko released another statement where she announced plans to resume her public performances from May 2022, and repeated her condemnation of the war in Ukraine, (Note: Usage of the word "war" in such context is banned in Russia) distancing herself from Putin.

I expressly condemn the war on Ukraine and my thoughts are with the victims of this war and their families. My position is clear. I am not a member of any political party nor am I allied with any leader of Russia. I acknowledge and regret that past actions or statements of mine could have been misinterpreted. In fact, I have met President Putin only a handful of times in my entire life, most notably on the occasion of receiving awards in recognition of my art or at the Olympics opening ceremony. I have otherwise never received any financial support from the Russian Government, and live and am a tax resident in Austria. I love my homeland of Russia and only seek peace and unity through my art. After taking my announced break, I will resume performing in late May, initially in Europe.

Netrebko was denounced as a traitor of Russia after her second statement, with her Russian performances cancelled and a Duma deputy suggesting that she resign from her Russian titles. Berlin State Opera manager Matthias Schulz later announced that he had been contacting Netrebko about performances scheduled in 2023.

In June 2022, Netrebko filed a labor grievance against the Met with the assistance of the American Guild of Musical Artists. In March 2023, an arbitrator ordered the Met to pay her over $200,000 for the cancelled performances while she pay a $30,000 penalty for making "highly inappropriate" statements following the invasion.

=== Later career ===
Netrebko discussing her portrayal of Aida at the Gran Teatre del Liceu in 2026

In April 2022, Netrebko stepped in for Maria Agresta in Manon Lescaut at the Opéra de Monte-Carlo. Her solo concerts in May 2022 at the Philharmonie de Paris and La Scala were described by the press as "triumphant". During summer 2022, she sang Aida and Turandot at the Arena di Verona with critical acclaim. In September 2022, she opened the 2022/23 season of the Vienna State Opera, singing Mimì in La bohème. Her performance was met with a mix of applause and boos from protesters. It was noted by a Viennese critic that her voice was no longer suitable for the role.

In June 2023, she opened the 100th edition of Arena di Verona Festival as Aida from Verdi. On 24 July 2023, she made her debuts at the Théâtre Antique d'Orange, closing the Chorégies d'Orange festival with a Verdi Gala also featuring Yusif Eyvazov and conducted by Michelangelo Mazza.

In May 2024, Netrebko performed Puccini's Turandot at the Internationale Maifestspiele Wiesbaden in a new production of the Hessisches Staatstheater Wiesbaden with stage direction and scenic design by Daniela Kerck. A reviewer from the Frankfurter Rundschau wrote that her heavy soprano was precise in all registers, with a velvety middle range, and her acting responsive to the story-line.

In June 2026, Netrebko, alongside other musicians, performed a recital at the Royal Opera House in London.

=== Use of face-darkening makeup ===
Netrebko has often performed the titular character in Aida, an Ethiopian princess. Some of the productions which she has performed in have incorporated the use of face-darkening makeup, including her role debut at the Salzburg Festival in 2017, and at the Metropolitan Opera in 2018—despite the opera company's 2015 pledge to eliminate the use of face-darkening makeup in its productions. In June 2019 she defended such choice in the comments under her Instagram post for a performance.

In July 2022, Netrebko and the Arena di Verona Festival faced heavy criticism for performing in blackface, following the release of publicity photos for a performance of Aida. Subsequently, American soprano Angel Blue canceled her upcoming performances of La traviata at the Festival, citing the company's insistence on maintaining the practice. Blue's cancellation initiated heated discussion. Yusif Eyvazov called Blue's decision "disgusting," while mezzo-soprano Grace Bumbry offered a conciliatory perspective.

Other notable singers to have publicly spoken out against the use of blackface in Opera include the mezzo-soprano Jamie Barton who named Netrebko directly, and Stephanie Blythe, who suggested an abstention from performing operas that have typically featured white singers made up to appear as other ethnicities.

Responding to the controversy surrounding blackface, the Arena di Verona Festival claimed it is "very hard to change" the production to avoid the use of blackface (this staging dates from 2002). The Festival also stated that when Blue signed her contract for La traviata, this staging of Aida was already planned and she should already have known that blackface was to be used.

== Other activities ==
Netrebko serves as an honorary director of the Russian Children's Welfare Society and has featured in several editions of "Petroushka Ball", the major fund raiser of the charity. In 2007, she was announced to be an ambassador for SOS Children's Villages in Austria, and a sponsor for the Tomilino village in Russia. She has been supporting the association "projekt Anna - Kinderhilfe Kaliningrad e.V." since 2005, and became its patron in 2008. In May 2012, she and her then-partner Erwin Schrott jointly founded the charitable foundation "Anna Netrebko and Erwin Schrott 4 Kids", aiming to promote education, art, culture and youth welfare.

Netrebko made a cameo appearance as herself in the 2004 film The Princess Diaries 2: Royal Engagement.

She has worn several designs by Austrian fashion designer Irina Vitjaz, who is a close friend of hers.

=== Political activity and relationship with Vladimir Putin ===
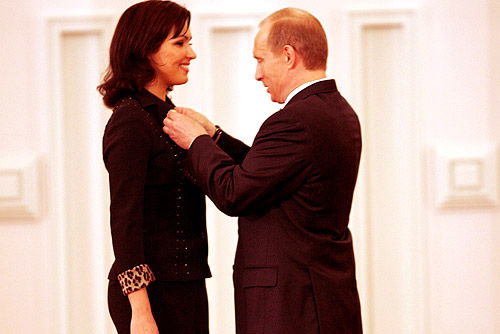
Netrebko and Putin in 2004 as she received the State Prize of the Russian Federation.

As of 2022, there has been a debate over her association with Russian president Vladimir Putin. In 2012 she appeared on a list of 499 celebrities endorsing Putin in the 2012 Russian presidential election alongside Valery Gergiev and Denis Matsuev. She later explained this as a gesture of recognition of Putin's support for the arts. After a blogger published that she also appeared on a declaration of support for Putin in 2018 she stated several times that she did not sign this declaration, that her name was kept from the 2012 list without her approval and that she did not even participate in the vote.

In 2011, she rejected claims that she and Putin had formerly been romantically involved, though she jokingly said "I'd have loved to have been ... he's a very attractive man. Such a strong, male energy."

In December 2014, she gave a ₽1,000,000 cheque to Oleg Tsaryov saying she was donating to the Donetsk Opera and Ballet Theatre, and posed alongside him with a flag of Novorossiya, a self-proclaimed confederation in Ukraine. Tsaryov is one of the individuals sanctioned by the European Union for his role in the 2014 pro-Russian unrest in Ukraine. Netrebko said in a statement, "I want to make clear, however, that this donation is not a political act."

Following the 2022 Russian invasion of Ukraine, Netrebko has held varying public stances. In late February 2022, she said on social media that she opposed the invasion, but subsequently described people who forced her to express her political position as "human s***s" who "are as evil as blind aggressors." Her second statement came on 30 March 2022, where she repeated her condemnation of the war in Ukraine; distancing herself from Putin. The Putin-controlled Russian Duma denounced her a traitor to her nation. The Met Opera's general manager Peter Gelb has criticised Netrebko for her ties to Putin during the Russo-Ukrainian war. Netrebko has sued Gelb for gender discrimination, stating that male opera singers connected to Putin were treated more favorably.

Since January 2023, she was among the public figures who were sanctioned by the Government of Ukraine. On 15 May 2025, about 100 Vitsche Berlin supporters demonstrated outside the Berlin State Opera to condemn performances by Anna Netrebko in light of her support of Putin.

== Personal life ==
Netrebko applied for Austrian citizenship in Vienna in March 2006. In response to the backlash in her native country, she cited the cumbersome and humiliating process of obtaining visas as a Russian citizen for her many performances abroad as the main reason for the decision. In late July, the Council of Ministers approved the application for her "special merits", despite the fact that she neither spoke German nor lived in Austria.

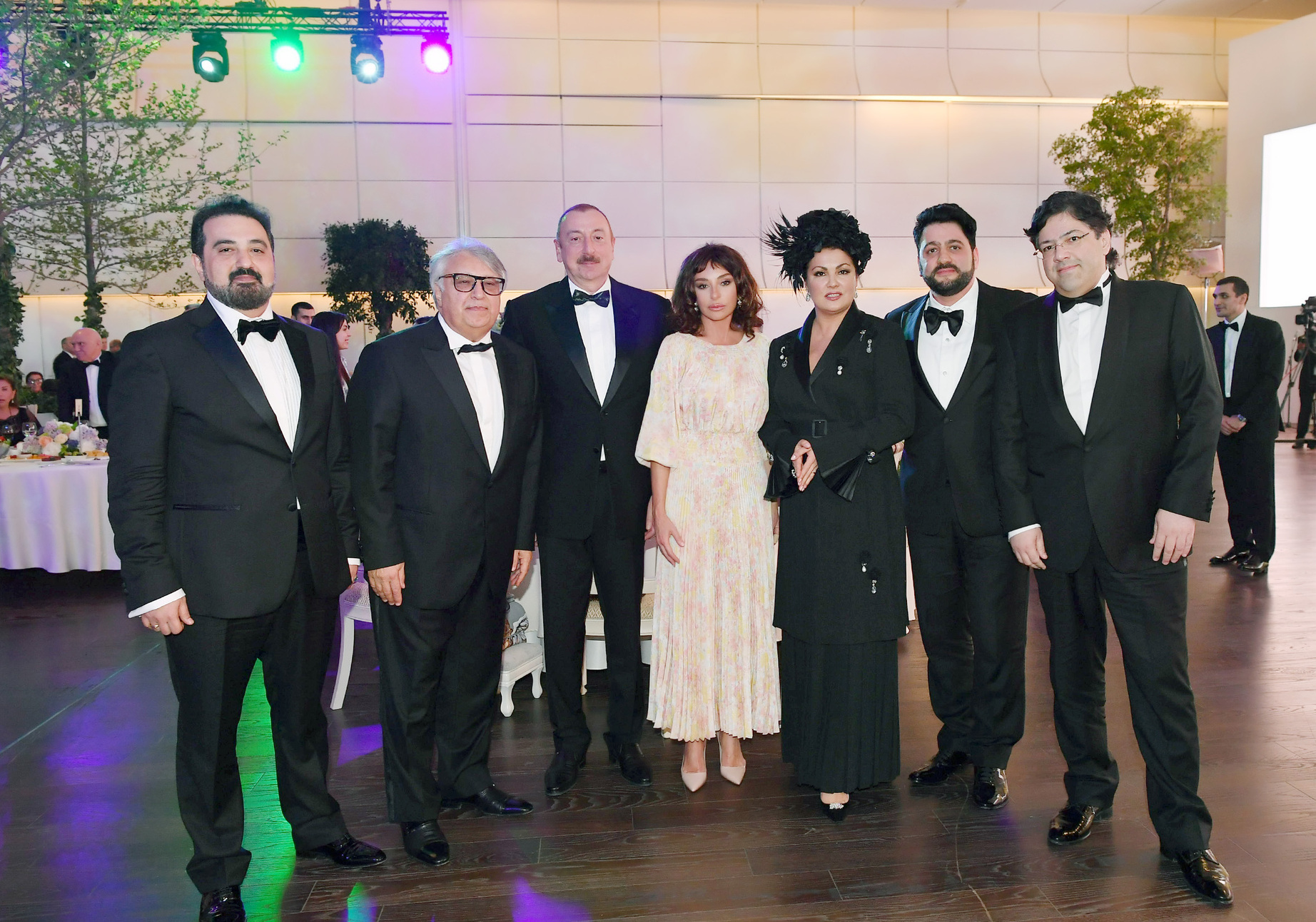
Netrebko with her husband Yusif Eyvazov and Azerbaijan's President Ilham Aliyev in May 2019

Netrebko started a relationship with Italian bass-baritone Simone Alberghini when they met during performances of Rigoletto at the Washington National Opera in 1999. She announced their engagement but did not consider marrying due to a busy schedule. In May 2007 their relationship was confirmed as ended.

In December 2007, Netrebko became engaged to Uruguayan bass-baritone Erwin Schrott, whom she first met during a collaboration in 2003. In April 2008, she announced their marriage, but their wedding never in fact took place. Their son, Tiago Aruã, was born on 5 September 2008 in Vienna. On 25 November 2013, the couple announced their separation, after several months of leading largely separate lives.

In February 2014, during rehearsals for a staging of Manon Lescaut in Rome, Netrebko began a relationship with Azerbaijani tenor Yusif Eyvazov, her co-star in that opera. Five months later, the couple announced their engagement. They married in Vienna on 29 December 2015. Their official wedding ceremony took place at the Palais Coburg, and the following celebration at the Gartenpalais Liechtenstein welcomed 180 guests in attendance, including Plácido Domingo. Netrebko announced their separation on 26 June 2024.

Netrebko has apartments in Saint Petersburg, Vienna, and New York City. In 2008, upon her pregnancy, she looked for a new residence in Vienna. That year, she purchased and renovated a penthouse apartment at Franziskanerplatz. The renovation was not finished and she still lived in her original apartment by 2010. The building was evacuated in February 2010 due to acute danger of collapsing and only reopened two months later. In November 2009, she moved into a new apartment above Lincoln Square, Manhattan, where she combined two units for additional space.

== Awards and honors ==
=== Musical awards ===
Netrebko won 2006 Bambi Award in the classical music category. She was awarded the "World Star" of the BraVo International Professional Music Awards 2018.

She won the 2007 Singer of the Year and the 2008 Female Artist of Year in the Classical Brit Awards. She was identified by the journal Musical America as "a genuine superstar for the 21st century" and was named Musician of the Year for 2008. Netrebko was one of the recipients of Leading Ladies Award 2012 awarded by Madonna magazine. She received another Leading Ladies Award in the category of Culture in 2016. She was presented an Opera News Award in April 2016.

Netrebko won the "Female Singer of the Year" (Sängerin des Jahres) in the 2014 and 2016 Echo Klassik Award. She was awarded "Best Vocalist in Classical Music" at the Russian National Music Awards in 2016, 2017 and 2018. She won the Best Female Singer in the 2017 International Opera Awards. On 26 October 2018, the Metropolitan Opera Guild honored her on its annual luncheon. In 2020 she was awarded the Swedish Polar Music Prize and the Victoire d'honneur in the Victoires de la musique classique.

In September 2022, she received an "Österreichischer Musiktheaterpreis" as Best Female Leading Role for her portrayal of Lady Macbeth in “Macbeth” in Wiener Staatsoper.

=== State honors and others ===
In 2004, Netrebko was awarded the State Prize of the Russian Federation. In February 2008, she was named People's Artist of Russia. In May 2018, she received the Order of Friendship from the Azerbaijani president. In February 2017, the Austrian government named her Kammersängerin.

On 18 September 2021, Netrebko celebrated her 50th birthday with a concert held in the Kremlin in Moscow. The concert featured friends and stars as Eyvazov, Rolando Villazon, Plácido Domingo and Michael Volle. Putin congratulated from afar through Dmitri Peskov, because he had been exposed to coronavirus cases. Part of the proceeds from ticket sales were said to be donated to the Arithmetic of Good charity fund, which helps orphans.

Asteroid 31104 Annanetrebko was named in her honor. The official naming citation was published by the Minor Planet Center on 31 January 2018 (M.P.C. 108697).

== Opera roles ==
- Susanna, Le nozze di Figaro (Mozart)
- Königin der Nacht, Die Zauberflöte (Mozart)
- Lyudmila, Ruslan and Lyudmila (Glinka)
- Pamina, Die Zauberflöte (Mozart)
- Rosina, Il barbiere di Siviglia (Rossini)
- Adina, L'elisir d'amore (Donizetti)
- Micaëla, Carmen (Bizet)
- Flower Maiden, Parsifal (Wagner)
- Louisa, Betrothal in a Monastery (Prokofiev)
- Xenia, Boris Godunov (Mussorgsky)
- Ninetta, The Love for Three Oranges (Prokofiev)
- Violetta, La traviata (Verdi)
- Amina, La sonnambula (Bellini)
- Teresa, Benvenuto Cellini (Berlioz)
- Gilda, Rigoletto (Verdi)
- Ilia, Idomeneo (Mozart)
- Musetta, La bohème (Puccini)
- Natasha, War and Peace (Prokofiev)
- Lucia, Lucia di Lammermoor (Donizetti)
- Zerlina, Don Giovanni (Mozart)
- Marfa, The Tsar's Bride (Rimsky-Korsakov)
- Antonia, Les contes d'Hoffmann (Offenbach)
- Giulietta, I Capuleti e i Montecchi (Bellini)
- Donna Anna, Don Giovanni (Mozart)
- Servilia, La clemenza di Tito (Mozart)
- Juliette, Roméo et Juliette (Gounod)
- Mimì, La bohème (Puccini)
- Norina, Don Pasquale (Donizetti)
- Manon Lescaut, Manon (Massenet)
- Elvira, I puritani (Bellini)
- Iolanta, Iolanta (Tchaikovsky)
- Anna Bolena, Anna Bolena (Donizetti)
- Tatiana, Eugene Onegin (Tchaikovsky)
- Giovanna, Giovanna d'Arco (Verdi)
- Leonora, Il trovatore (Verdi)
- Manon Lescaut, Manon Lescaut (Puccini)
- Lady Macbeth, Macbeth (Verdi)
- Sylva Varescu, Die Csárdásfürstin (Kálmán) (Note: Concert performance)
- Elsa, Lohengrin (Wagner)
- Adriana Lecouvreur, Adriana Lecouvreur (Cilea)
- Maddalena de Coigny, Andrea Chénier (Giordano)
- Aida, Aida (Verdi)
- Floria Tosca, Tosca (Puccini)
- Leonora, La forza del destino (Verdi)
- Turandot, Turandot (Puccini)
- Elisabetta, Don Carlos (Verdi)
- Gioconda, La Gioconda (Ponchielli)
- Abigaille, Nabucco (Verdi)
- Amelia, Un Ballo in Maschera (Verdi)

Forthcoming roles include the operas La fanciulla del West, Pikovoya Dama and Ariadne auf Naxos.

== See also ==
- Teodor Currentzis, Russian Greek conductor
