= Diana Vishneva =

Russian ballet dancer

Diana Vishneva Диана Вишнёва
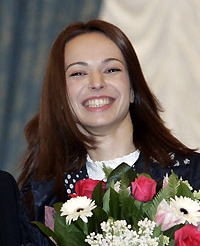
- Vishneva in 2007
- Born: Diana Viktorovna Vishneva; 13 July 1976 (age 50); Leningrad, Russian SFSR, Soviet Union
- Occupation: Ballet dancer
- Years active: 1995–present
- Spouse: Konstantin Selinevich (m. 2013)
- Children: 1
- Career
- Current group: Mariinsky Ballet
- Former groups: American Ballet Theatre
- Website: vishneva.ru

Vishneva in the making of Hans van Manen's 'LIVE' in 2015

Diana Viktorovna Vishneva (also trans. Vishnyova; Russian: Диана Викторовна Вишнёва; born 13 July 1976) is a Russian ballet dancer who performs as a principal dancer with the Mariinsky Ballet (formerly the Kirov Ballet).

== Personal life ==
Vishneva was born in Leningrad, Soviet Union (now Saint Petersburg, Russia), the second of two daughters. Her great-grandfather Lotfulla Aflyatunov, a hereditary mullah, was born in the Apastovsky District, Tatarstan. In 1930, he was exiled to Siberia and then moved to Kyrgyzstan, where Diana's mother was born. She is a practicing Orthodox Christian, having been baptized in an Orthodox church. She married Konstantin Selinevich in 2013. They have a son, Rudolf-Viktor, born 13 May 2018.

== Career ==
Vishneva was trained at the Vaganova Academy of Russian Ballet. While at the Vaganova school, she scored the highest scores known in the school's history. During her last year at the Academy she also trained at the Mariinsky Theatre. Vishneva joined the Mariinsky Ballet Company upon her graduation in 1995. Two prizes at the start of her career at the Mariinsky – the Benois de la Danse and the Golden Sofit helped Vishneva rise up the ranks swiftly. She was promoted to principal in 1996.

Vishneva first appeared with the American Ballet Theatre during its 2003 spring season. She joined the company as a principal dancer in 2005. Vishneva retired from the ABT in 2017.

In 2008, Vishneva joined the Honorary Board of Directors of the Russian Children's Welfare Society (RCWS). Vishneva was one of the featured dancers in the 2006 documentary Ballerina. In 2014, she became the new face of Kérastase's latest product line and in-salon treatment, Discipline.

=== Roles performed ===
Vishneva's repertoire includes Don Quixote, Romeo and Juliet, La Bayadère, Sleeping Beauty, Swan Lake, Onegin (Cranko), The Firebird and Giselle. She also performs the works of modern choreographers, especially those of George Balanchine, William Forsythe and Roland Petit. She has enjoyed critical acclaim for her interpretation of Rubies, (the second movement of Balanchine's evening-length, ballet, Jewels) Giselle, and Kenneth MacMillan's Manon. Her partners have included such well-known dancers as Angel Corella, Vladimir Malakhov and Evan McKie.

In addition to dancing with the Kirov Ballet, Vishneva has made guest appearances with many ballet companies, including not only American Ballet Theatre, but also the Bolshoi Ballet, the Paris Opera Ballet, Teatro alla Scala in Milan and Berlin State Opera in Berlin.

In October 2011, the Mariinsky Theatre hosted the premiere of the new ballet project Diana Vishneva: Dialogues, which brings together works by world class choreographers – Martha Graham (USA) Paul Lightfoot and Sol León (Netherlands) and John Neumeier (Germany). The programme, which consists of three independent ballets, has since been performed to great acclaim in Moscow and New York.

She also appeared in the opening ceremony of the 2014 Winter Olympics in Sochi.

== Awards ==
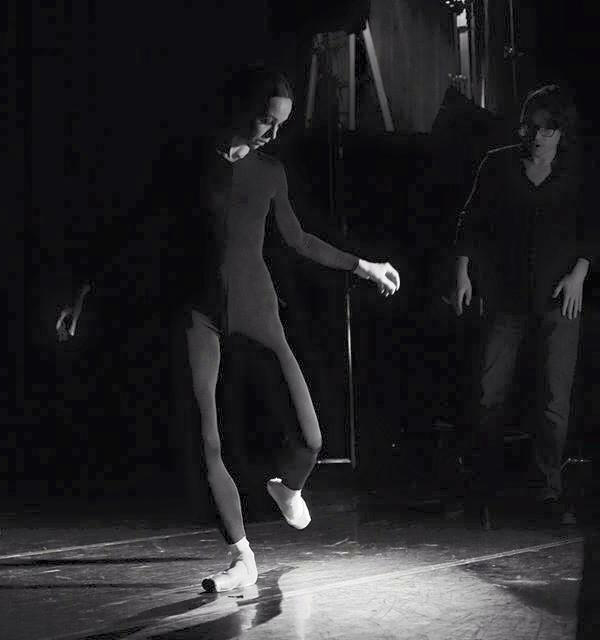
Visheva with Andrei Severny on the set of Gravitation: Variation in Time and Space in 2014

- People's Artist of Russia (2007)
- Recipient of the State Prize of Russia (2000)
- Prizewinner at the International Ballet Competition (Lausanne, 1994)
- Recipient of the Benois de la Danse prize (1996), the Golden Sofit (1996), the Baltika prize (1998), the Golden Mask (2001), the Dancer of Europe 2002 prize, Ballet magazine prize (2003)
- Recipient of Russia’s Golden Mask theatre prize (2009) in three categories: “Ballet/Best Production”, “Ballet/Contemporary dance/Best actress” and “Critics' Award” (Diana Vishneva: Beauty in Motion; project by Sergei Danilian, USA-Russia)
- Recipient of Russia's Golden Mask theatre prize (2013) in the categories: “Ballet/ Best Production” and “Ballet/Contemporary dance/Best actress” (Diana Vishneva: Dialogues)

== Exhibitions ==
- 2012, Diana Vishneva through the Lens of Patrick Demarchelier, Multimedia Art Museum, Moscow
- 2014, Vishneva created her first 'haute couture' dancewear line in collaboration with Grishko and Tatyana Parfionova.

== See also ==
- Russian Context festival
- List of Russian ballet dancers
