= Andrei Severny (filmmaker) =

Russian filmmaker (born 1977)

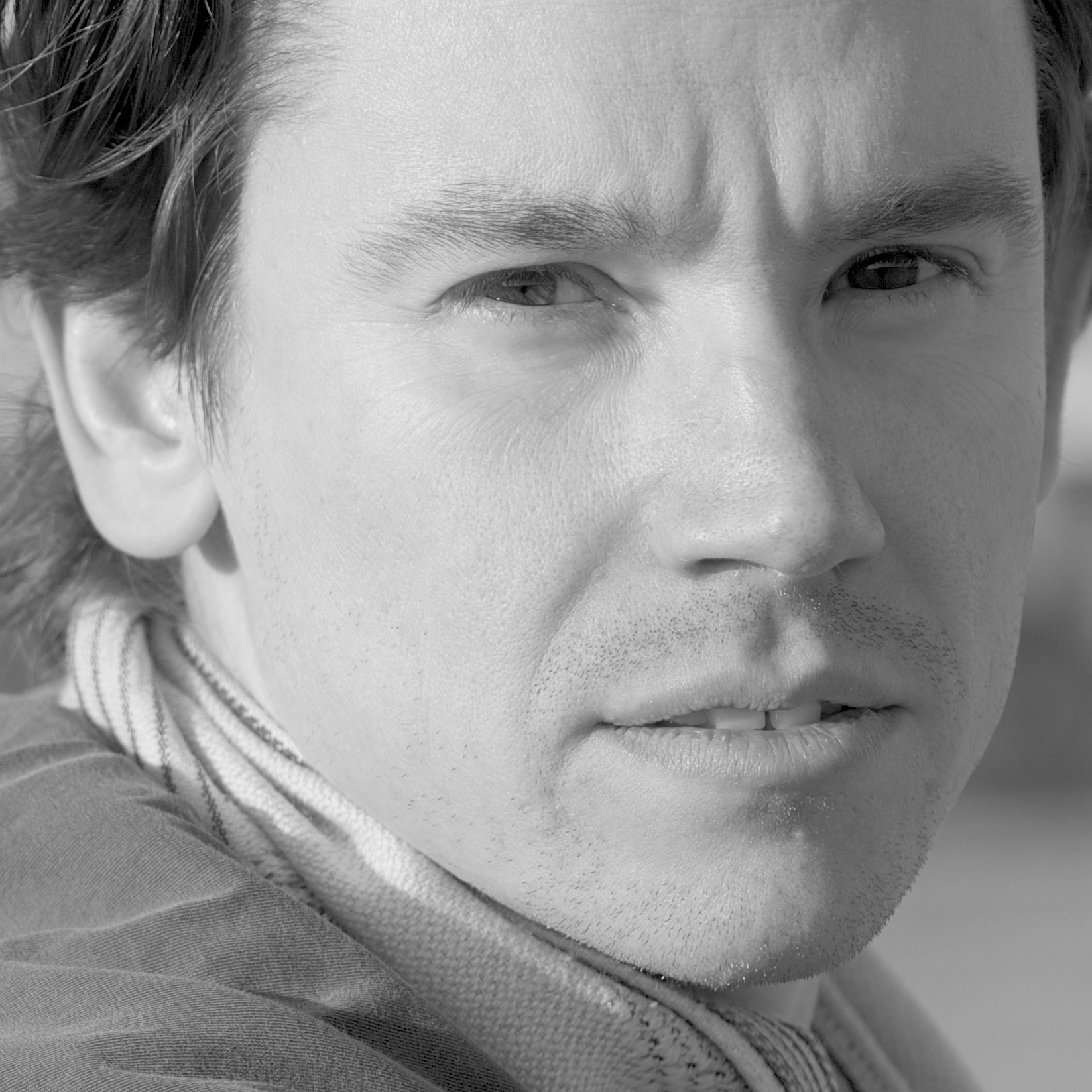
- Andrei Severny in 2013
- Born: September 1, 1977 (age 48); Moscow, Russia
- Occupations: director, screenwriter, photographer
- Years active: 1997–present
- Website: http://www.severny.com

Andrei Severny (Russian: Андрей Северный; born September 1, 1977) is a contemporary filmmaker, screenwriter, photographer and visual artist. Severny's films include Buried Seeds, Inside Risk: Shadows of Medellin, Gravitation: Variation in Time and Space, Condition, Teaching to See, Disparaît, v and Tom on Mars.

== Biography ==
Andrei Severny was born in 1977 in Moscow, Russia and spent his early childhood years in Egypt. He is a grandson of Andrei Severny, the Soviet astronomer. He moved to New York in 2004.

== Photography ==
Severny's earliest published work was a series of atmospheric urban stills in Monitor magazine from 2000 to 2005. During this period his work was also exhibited in Moscow. His photographs have been published in Vogue, Elle, The Financial Times and The Wall Street Journal.

== Films ==
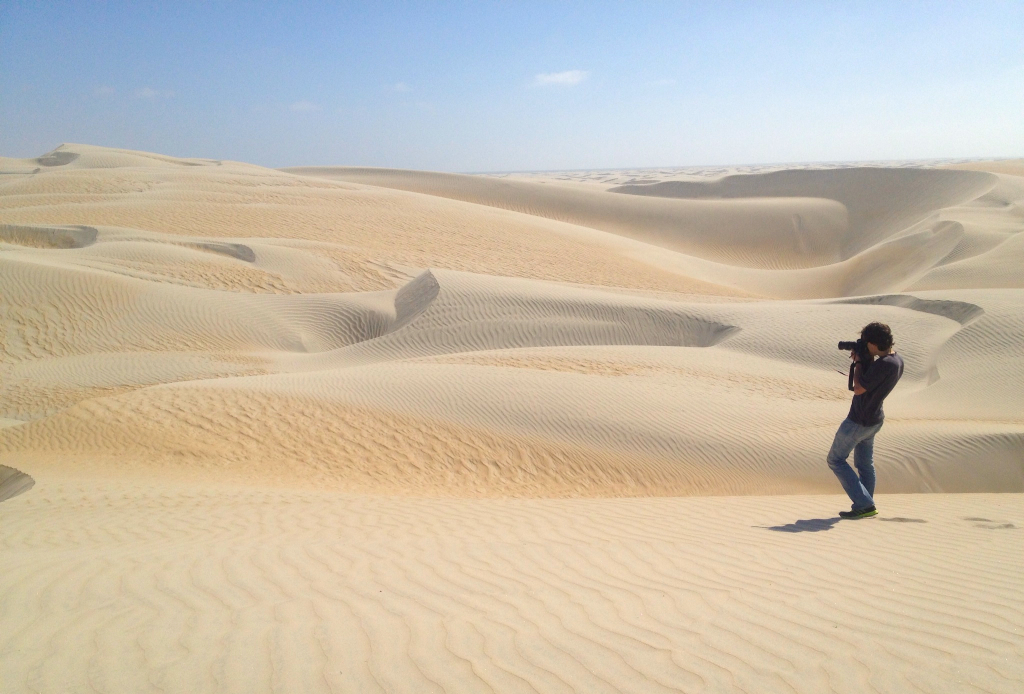
Andrei Severny takes pictures of the desert in Baja California, Mexico

Severny's films juxtapose poetry with technology, architecture and landscape. In 2005, his short films Tom on Mars and Disparaît, v, screened at festivals in London, New York City, Barcelona, Milan, Kolkata, and Avignon.

In 2007 Severny began a collaboration with Edward Tufte, an expert on information design and data visualization, on a series of films on art and science. As part of this collaboration in 2012 Severny made a documentary film Teaching to See about teaching and design of Inge Druckrey, which includes visual insights from her colleague Kris Holmes and former students.

Filmmaker Amir Naderi was the producer and co-editor of Severny's feature film Condition, which tells the story of a doctor and patient escaping a catastrophe looking for salvation in nature and sound. The film premiered at the 29th Torino Film Festival in 2011, where it received a special mention by the Gandhi Glasses Award along with Werner Herzog's Into The Abyss.

In 2013 Severny works on a documentary based on the calligraphy of Kris Holmes and the research of her husband Charles Bigelow. This film studies different cultural aspects of writing and explores its relationship to rhythm and motion in music and dance.

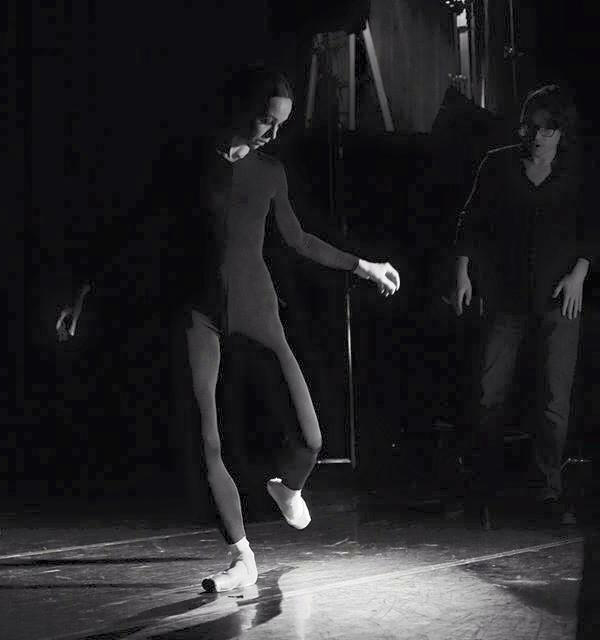
Film Director Andrei Severny and Diana Vishneva on the set of Gravitation: Variation in Time and Space

In 2013 Severny also started to develop a feature-length sci-fi film called Zona del Silencio: a story about a journalist who gets involved in a series of mysterious events that parallel with his dangerous love affair – to be shot in Spanish on location in Mexico.

In 2015 Severny collaborated with ballerina Diana Vishneva creating an art film Gravitation: Variation in Time and Space. Black and white experimental film premiered at the Marfa Film Festival are received international awards.

In 2016 Severny co-directed and edited an interactive documentary Inside Risk: Shadows of Medellin, based on a true story of kidnapping that took place in Colombia in 1986.

In 2017 Severny is working on a feature-length documentary Buried Seeds, based on a life journey of chef Vikas Khanna. The film had a first screening at the Venice Film Festival in September 2017.

== Art installations ==
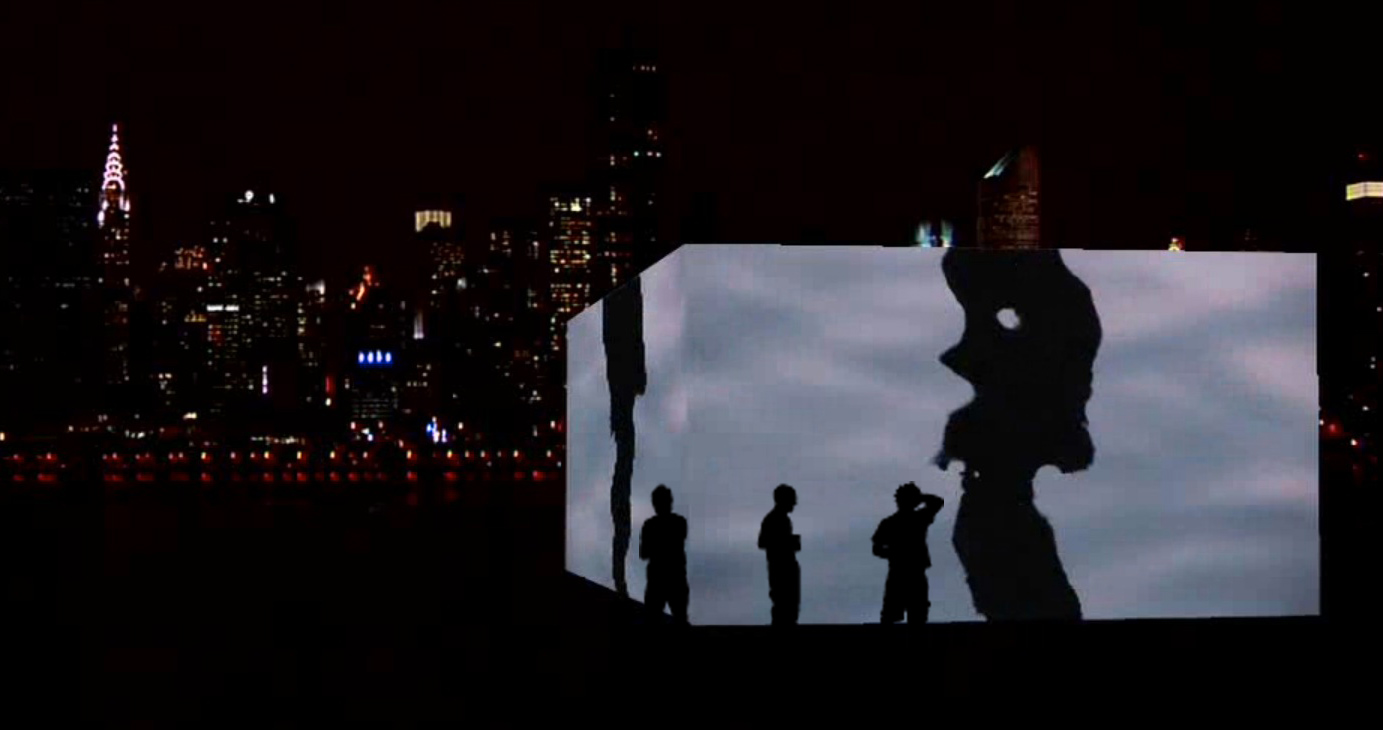
Minamo video installation, New York City

At least as far back as 2007, Severny began experimenting with video sequences of light and water. From these, he developed a series of video installations called Minamo, meaning water surface or face of the water in Japanese. Abstract, colorful water surfaces slowly move in the dark. Minamo was first shown in 2009 at the Webster Hall in New York on 39 plasma screens. In 2010 Minamo was part of Nuit Blanche New York. In summer 2011 it was presented at SET Gallery and in October 2011 at the New York Aquarium as part of Art On Brighton exhibition.

In 2009 he began work on a reflection on the life and music of atonal pioneer Arnold Schoenberg. The multiscreen rear-projection installation shows vivid, fast moving images generated by video feedback of pointing a camera into a screen, creating an infinite loop of mostly abstract images. The work, Intravertigo, was shown outdoors on three screens as part of Nuit Blanche New York 2011.

== PlayGround ==
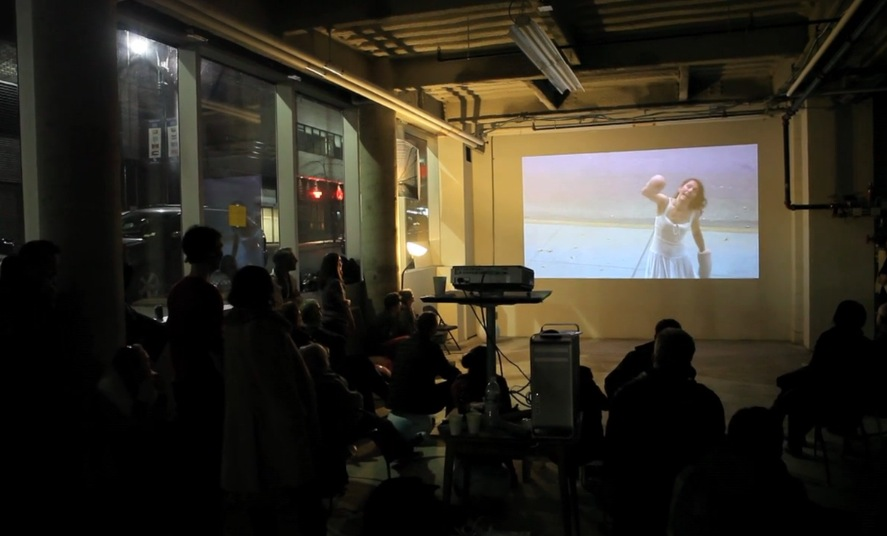
PlayGround art salon in New York city founded and curated by Andrei Severny.

Severny also curates an art salon, PlayGround, that he founded in 2009, selecting some of the most creative professionals who show their work on a large screen or perform live. His guests have included Doug Fitch, Paul Lewis, Miru Kim, Asa Mader, Tristan Perich, Niloufar Talebi, Aurélia Thiérrée, Malika Zarra, Clarina Bezzola, Vicky Colombet, Edouard Getaz and Ji Lee.

== Filmography ==
- 2017 – Buried Seeds
- 2016 – Inside Risk: Shadows of Medellin, co-directed with Edouard Getaz
- 2015 – Gravitation: Variation in Time and Space
- 2012 – Teaching to See
- 2011 – Condition
- 2005 – Disparaît, v
- 2005 – Tom on Mars

== Exhibitions ==
- 2016 – Demolden Gallery, Saragossa, Spain
- 2013 – IFP Media Center, New York City
- 2011 – Nuit Blanche, New York City
- 2011 – SET Gallery, New York City
- 2011 – New York Aquarium, New York City
- 2010 – Nuit Blanche, New York City
