= Gravitation: Variation in Time and Space =

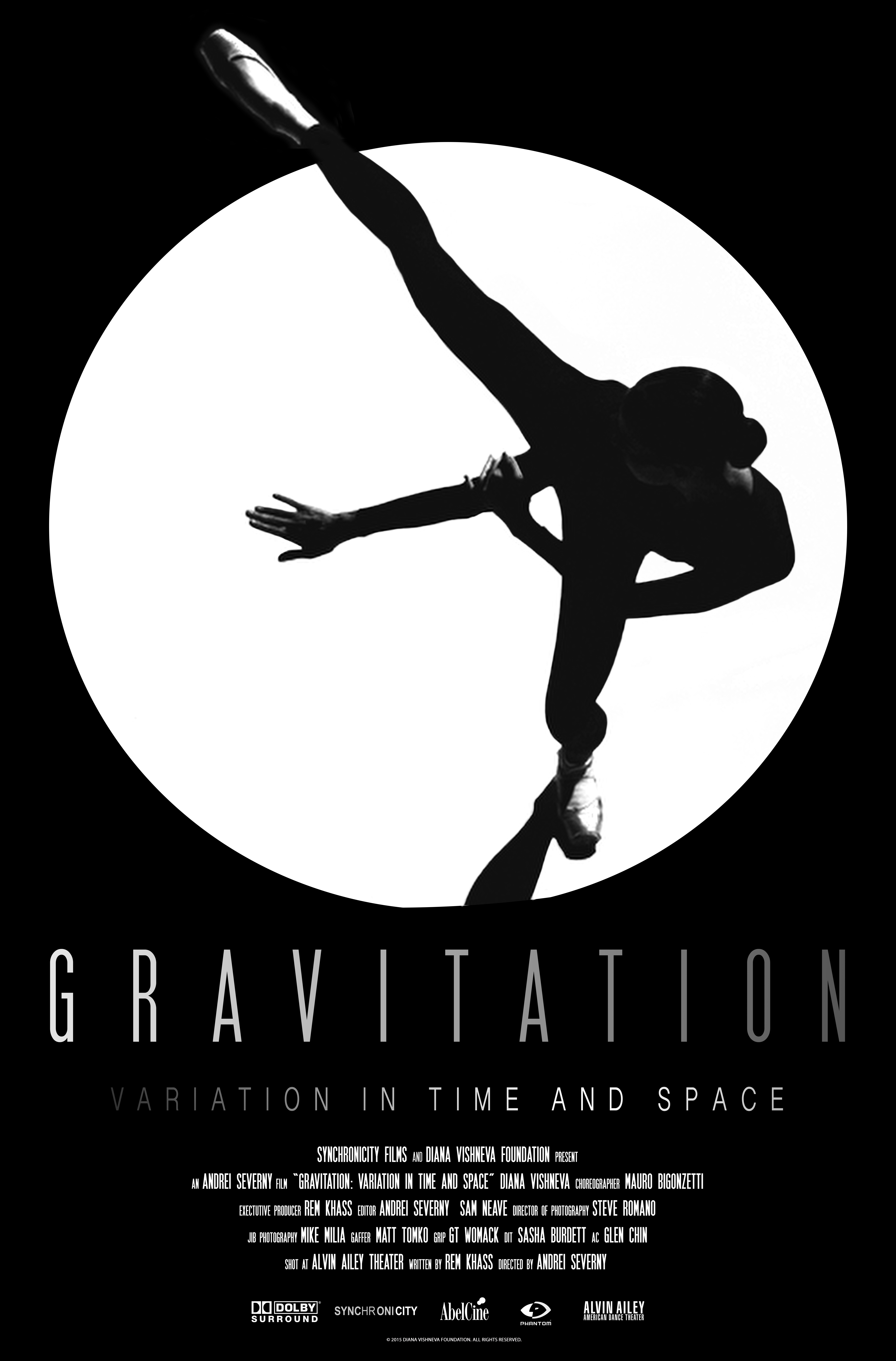
- Directed by: Andrei Severny
- Written by: Rem Hass, Andrei Severny
- Produced by: Rem Hass
- Starring: Diana Vishneva
- Cinematography: Steve Romano
- Edited by: Andrei Severny
- Music by: Arvo Part, Richard Garet
- Release date: October 16, 2015 (Marfa Film Festival)
- Running time: 14 minutes
- Country: United States
- Language: English

Gravitation: Variation in Time and Space is a 2015 black & white art film, written and produced by Rem Hass and directed by Andrei Severny. Gravitation is a synergy of dance, cinema and abstract art and stars Diana Vishneva, principal dancer of the Mariinsky Ballet and the American Ballet Theatre. The movements were choreographed by Mauro Bigonzetti specifically for the film. The work was shot entirely in slow motion with Phantom Flex4K cameras in 500-1,000 frames-per-second. The film was shot on location at the Alvin Ailey American Dance Theater in New York City.

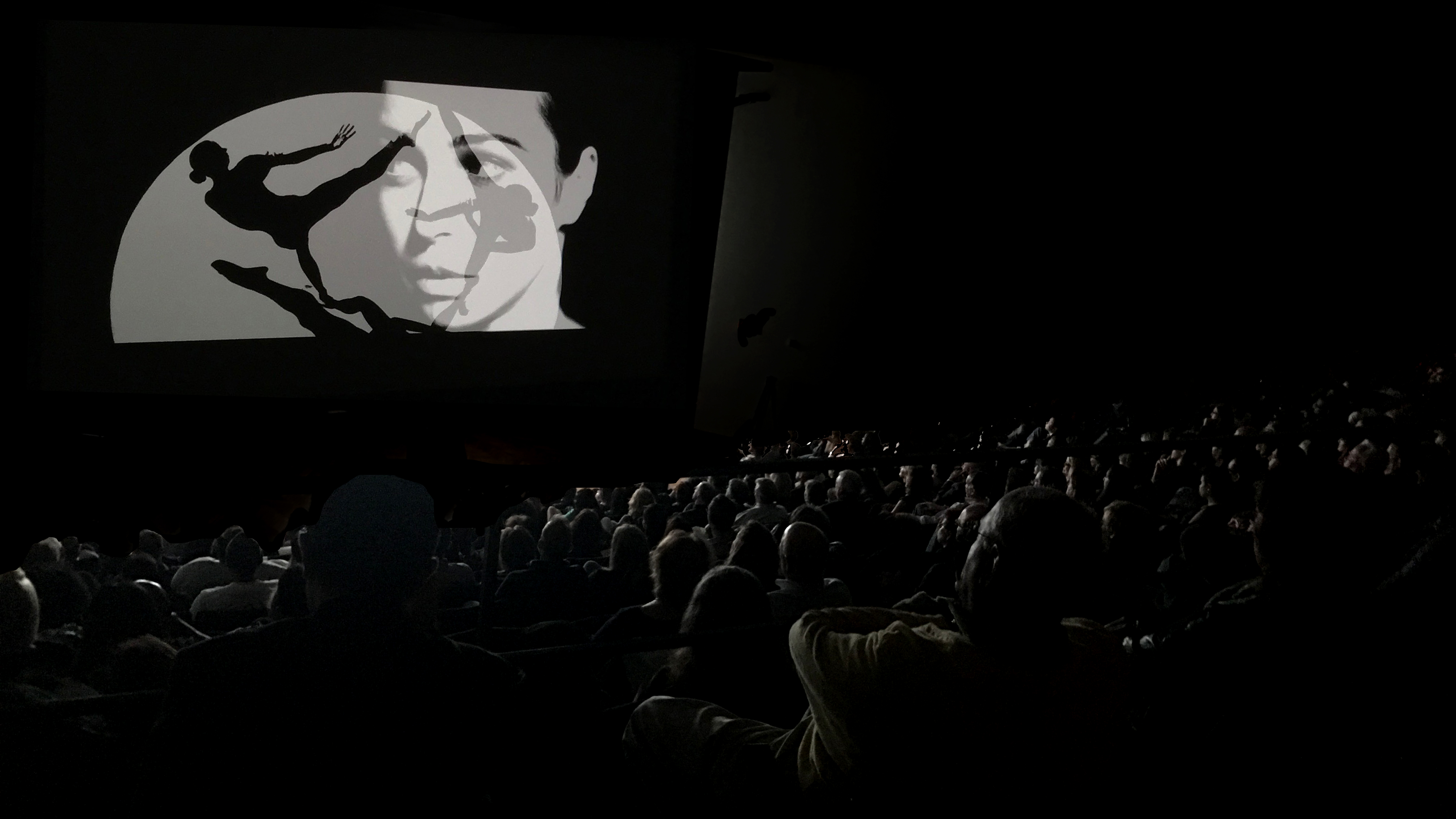
Screening of Gravitation: Variation in Time and Space at the MFAH in November 2015

== Synopsis ==
The film is a story of creation, inner struggle and transformation. Calligraphic black and white images are rich in metaphors exploring the notions of time and space, movement and light. The film is divided in chapters: Birth, Desire, Clash, Despair, Gravitation.

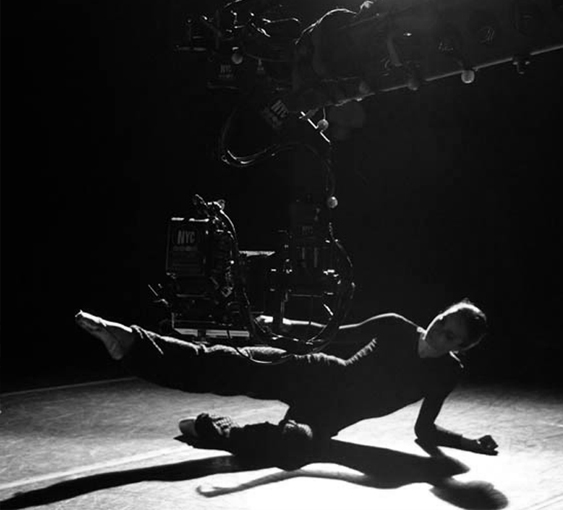
Diana Vishneva filmed with Phantom Flex4K camera on the set of Gravitation: Variation in Time and Space, 2015

The director Andrei Severny said about the film: “We tried to show the ballerina’s movement like you’ve never seen it before. Powerful back lighting and slow motion focuses viewer’s attention on the calligraphic perfection of the lines and guides into unusual visual world. The shots of the moon and space from the NASA archives become metaphors of loneliness and eternity of space and make us reconsider the whole notion of time.”

== Release and accolades ==
Gravitation premiered at the Marfa Film Festival in October 2015. It received a Golden Palm Award at the Mexico International Film Festival and a Rising Star Award at the Canada International Film Festival. It was selected by NASA as a finalist at the CineSpace program at the Houston Cinema Arts Festival and screened at the Museum of Fine Arts Houston and screened in Moscow, London, Rome, Santander, Napa, Martinique.
