= Context (disambiguation) =

Context is the relevant constraints of the communicative situation that influence language use, language variation, and discourse summary.

Context may also refer to:

== Computing ==
- Context (computing), the virtual environment required to suspend a running software program
- Lexical context or runtime context of a program, which determines name resolution
- Context awareness, a complementary to location awareness
- Context menu, a menu in a graphical user interface that appears upon user interaction
- ConTeXt, a macro package for the TeX typesetting system
- ConTEXT, a text editor for Microsoft Windows
- Operational context, a temporarily defined environment of cooperation
- Context (term rewriting), a formal expression $C[.]$ with a hole

== Other uses ==
- Context (festival), an annual Russian festival of modern choreography
- Archaeological context, an event in time which has been preserved in the archaeological record
- Opaque context, the linguistic context in which substitution of co-referential expressions does not preserve truth
- Trama (mycology) (context or flesh), the mass of non-hymenial tissues that composes the mass of a fungal fruiting body
- Context (rapper), also known as Context MC, stage name of George Musgrave
- "Context" (Stewart Lee's Comedy Vehicle), a TV episode
- Context, a news website operated by the Thomson Reuters Foundation

== See also ==
- Contextual (disambiguation)
- Contextualization (disambiguation)
- Locality (disambiguation)
- State (disambiguation)
