= Russian Children's Welfare Society =

- Formation: 1926
- Type: 501(c)(3) nonprofit
- Headquarters: (United States) New York
- President and CEO: Beatrice Sekula
- Website: www.rcws.org

The Russian Children's Welfare Society is a not-for-profit, 501(c)(3) organization based in New York City with branches in Moscow and San Francisco. It was founded in 1926 to help Russian children whose families fled to other countries after the onset of the Bolshevik Revolution in 1917. After the collapse of the Soviet Union in 1991, the Society refocused all of its efforts solely on Russia. The RCWS funds scholarship programs, medical procedures, pediatric hospitals, rehabilitation programs, and orphanages throughout Russia.

== History of RCWS ==
In forming the RCWS in 1926, the Society's founders announced their commitment to improving the lives of Russian children throughout the world, outside of the Soviet Union, at 125th Street YMCA in New York City. They embarked on their mission with a contribution that was sent to support Russian shelters in Latvia. Society's many programs today reflect that legacy. The direction of the Russian Children's Welfare Society has been shaped by many of the 20th century's most tumultuous events. The Bolshevik Revolution of 1917 prompted the emigration of large numbers of Russians to Europe, Asia, North and South America. By the early 1930s, the Society had ten branches operating throughout the United States and was sending money and material assistance to schools and organizations, assisting Russian children in Estonia, Poland, Finland, France, Germany, Yugoslavia, Bulgaria, Czechoslovakia, China, and Turkey.

The occupation of many of these countries during World War II suspended much of the Society's work, which was prohibited after America's entry into the war in 1941. After the liberation of France from Hitler's occupation in 1944, the Society worked closely with the American Committee for Assistance to France and sent $25,000 in cash, food and clothing. By 1945, RCWS assistance was providing hot breakfasts in French schools, serving approximately 1,100 children.

During World War II, the Society's leadership decided to professionalize its operations and expanded its staff. The RCWS eventually gained recognition by the Presidential War Relief Control Board as an approved charity for work abroad during the war. By 1950, the Society was again sending relief to 14 countries.

Among the long-term volunteers of the RCWS was Princess Vera Konstantinovna of Russia (1906–2001), a great-granddaughter of Tsar Nicholas I of Russia and the youngest child of Grand Duke Constantine Constantinovich of Russia. Princess Vera was born in Imperial Russia and was a childhood playmate of Nicholas II's younger children. At the age of twelve, she escaped revolutionary Russia and spent the rest of her life in exile, first in Europe and from the 1950s in the United States. From November 1952 until 1969, Princess Vera worked at the Russian Children's Welfare Society, assisting with the day-to-day activities of the organization. She died at the Tolstoy Foundation elderly care home in Nyack, New York, at the age of 94. Princess Vera was the last member of the Romanov dynasty who was born in Russia.

With the start of the Cold War, it became all but impossible for Society to send aid to countries that were behind the "iron curtain." The Society continued to carry out its work helping Russian children in western European countries, particularly France, as well as the Far East, South America, and the United States. After the collapse of the Soviet Union in 1991, the Society shifted its focus and resources to assist impoverished children living in Russia, having received a $4.5 million bequest from the estate of Virginia P. and John Engalitcheff Jr. in 1990. Since January 2009 – 2011, the Society has disbursed over $3 million in direct aid to children in Russia through its medical programs, and scholarships and by supporting orphanages, homeless shelters, hospitals, rehabilitation centers for disabled children, and schools.

== Programs ==
=== Medical projects ===
==== Maxillofacial Surgery ====
The Russian Children's Welfare Society is currently working with the Russian Aid Foundation on a project entitled "Give Beauty Back to the Children" to raise funds for the Moscow Center for Maxillofacial Surgery to treat children with facial deformities.

=== Scholarship program ===
RCWS launched a scholarship program to help orphans transition to independent adult life and attain higher education. Since then, the number of participants has grown from 3 in the 2003–2004 academic year to 42 students in 2010–2011. To date, 18 scholarship recipients have completed their schooling and have found employment. Currently, RCWS is supporting over 40 students in the Pskov, Yaroslavl, Moscow, and Velikiy Novgorod regions of Russia. According to the Russian government statistics, 1 in 3 orphanage graduates will become homeless, 1 in 5 unemployed, 1 in 7 will commit a crime, and 1 in 10 will attempt suicide. To date, the RCWS's scholarship program has helped its students avoid these pitfalls by providing a complete support structure to students as they transition from living in an orphanage to attending a university on their own.

=== Orphanages ===
RCWS works to integrate orphans into society while also preparing them for the future. Many of the estimated 800,000 orphans in Russia are currently unprepared to take care of themselves or find a job—factors greatly contributing to the high rate of homelessness, prostitution, crime, drugs, and even suicide among them. RCWS helps orphanages meet basic needs as well as promotes comprehensive programs that help children develop into healthy and independent adults.

==== Solba Orphanage ====
One of the RCWS partners, Solba, is an orphanage for girls near the picturesque Nikolo-Solbinsky Convent in Russia that currently supports 30 talented young girls. Since 2008, RCWS has transferred over $200,000 to cover the roof and other renovation expenses at the Solba Orphanage building, as well as support the theatre program and other educational activities.

=== Granny Program ===
Seven years ago, RCWS initiated the "Granny Program" to aid grandmothers who lacked financial resources to care for their orphaned grandchildren. After its initial run, the program expanded to include any broken families in strained circumstances, struggling to care for orphaned children. The "Granny Program" currently supports 11 families.

=== Helping children with HIV/AIDS ===
In 2007, RCWS started working with the Foundation «Future without HIV/AIDS» and the All Russia Pediatric Aids Center in St. Petersburg, which provides assistance to infected orphans and pregnant women. At the Pediatric AIDS Center, there is a community of 40 sick and orphaned children who receive the attention of a dedicated staff of medical and educational professionals who foster their emotional development and integration into society.

=== Juvenile Rheumatoid Arthritis project ===
Over the last several years, RCWS has purchased specialized arthritis equipment for the Moscow Institute of Rheumatology and Sechenov Medical Academy. The Society has also helped facilitate training for Russian rheumatologists in New York and in Russia.

=== Joint project with Smile Train ===
In the fall of 2000, RCWS partnered with Smile Train, an American non-profit organization whose mission is to assist children born with cleft lip and palate worldwide. The project involved two of the most prominent Russian hospitals for children's facial reconstructive surgery: The Moscow Medical Stomatological Institute(MMSU) and the Moscow Center for Children's Maxillofacial Surgery. In December 2002, in order to help raise the standards of cleft care outside of Moscow, RCWS and MMSU hosted its 1st Training Symposium for 250 cleft practitioners, sponsored by The Smile Train and the Russian Ministry of Health.

=== New Year party ===
Every year, the Russian Children's Welfare Society hosts a New Year's celebration known as "Yelka" for over 1000 orphaned and sick children. In addition to the party, RCWS sends out festively clad volunteers and "Ded Moroz" (Russian Santa Claus) to distribute gifts at various children's hospitals.

== Events ==
=== Petroushka Ball ===
In old Russia, one of the most popular puppet theatre characters was Petrushka. According to popular lore, no matter his misfortune, he always bounced back to entertain the crowd. Igor Stravinsky, Michael Fokine, and Alexandre Benois created a ballet Petrushka, featuring the luckless but undefeated Petroushka who had fallen in love with a graceful ballerina. The Petroushka Ball, a traditional Russian ball held annually in New York City, is the primary fundraising event for the RCWS. The Ball was started in 1965 as an expansion of a small tea dance, by a group of members of the Society (Mr. and Mrs. Serge C. Bouteneff, Mrs. Ivan P. Obolensky, Mrs. Diane Eristavi, Princess Sergei Belosselsky-Belozersky) with a Junior Committee that was formed including Helen Basilevsky, Mafalda Chanler, Amy Gristede, Andre Kotchoubey, and Beatrice and Vladimir Fekula, the current President of the RCWS. To this day, the latter two still debate which one gets the credit for coming up with the name "Petroushka" during that first meeting. The late Helen Basilevsky, (granddaughter of White Army General Pyotr Nikolayevich Wrangel), designed the "Petroushka" emblem which is still used on all of its invitations and programs. The first Ball was held at the now defunct Delmonico Hotel; it sold out and was an overwhelming success. It has become one of New York's most vibrant and anticipated annual events, attracting upwards of 700 dinner and dancing guests. Past Petroushka Ball events were held at the Pierre, Plaza (for almost 40 years), and Waldorf-Astoria hotels. Since 2002, the Ball has featured opera greats such as Anna Netrebko, Dmitri Hvorostovsky, Rolando Villazón, Elīna Garanča, Elena Obraztsova, Matthew Polenzani, Maria Guleghina, Diana Damrau. Kate Lindsey, Piotr Beczała and Paul Groves, as well as soloists from the American Ballet Theatre, Bolshoi Theatre, Novaya Opera and the Spivakov Foundation. The 47th consecutive Petroushka Ball was held on February 10, 2012, at the Waldorf-Astoria Hotel. Featured guest performers included Olga Borodina and Ildar Abdrazakov with the kind permission of the Metropolitan Opera. Also, Olga Kern performed on the piano. The 48th Petroushka Ball took place on February 8, 2013, and signaled a return to the Plaza Hotel after a seven-year absence. Anna Netrebko made her fourth appearance. Return

=== Other events ===
Over the years, the Russian Children's Welfare Society has hosted a diverse list of events and maintains contact with some of the world's renowned classical performers, from American Ballet Theatre Principal Dancers to stars of the Metropolitan Opera. In 2007, RCWS participated in a fundraiser at Carnegie Hall. The sold out concert featured two of the leading opera singers in the world, Anna Netrebko, Soprano, making her Carnegie Hall debut, and Dmitri Hvorostovsky, Baritone, accompanied by the Orchestra of St. Luke's. Both Anna and Dmitri are Honorary Directors of RCWS. RCWS also hosted a fashion event with supermodel Sasha Pivovarova and designer Randi Rahm to raise funds for children with facial deformities. In 2010, the Society partnered with Bonhams Auction house for a sports gala that featured a number of Olympians, among which was champion figure skater Johnny Weir.

== Financial information ==
The Society's financial practices allow it to be able to channel 100% of its direct donations to help sick and needy children with overhead being met in its entirety through internal sources. RCWS has put in place a system of checks and balances to ensure that grants are used solely for their intended purpose: Organizations must provide a completed application detailing the project for which they are seeking support as well as a budget. The Society annually prepares audited financial statements which carry an unqualified opinion in conformity with generally accepted accounting principles.

== Notable friends of RCWS ==
- Piotr Beczała, Tenor, Metropolitan Opera
- Maxim Beloserkovsky, Principal Dancer, American Ballet Theatre
- Maria Butyskaya, Figure Skate, 1999 World Champion, Six-time Russian Champion, Three-time European Champion
- Sasha Cohen, Three-Time World Champion Figure Skater
- Diana Damreau, Soprano, Metropolitan Opera
- Irina Dvorovenko, Principal Dancer, American Ballet Theatre
- Elena Garanca, Mezzo-Soprano, Metropolitan Opera
- Natalia Glebova, Miss Universe 2005
- Paul Groves, Tenor, Metropolitan Opera
- Maria Guleghina, Soprano, Metropolitan Opera
- Dmitri Hvorotovsky, Baritone, Metropolitan Opera
- Maija Kovalevska, Soprano, Metropolitan Opera.
- Kate Lindsey, Mezzo-soprano, Metropolitan Opera
- Suzanne Massie, author
- Yuri Medvedev, Clown, Cirque du Soleil
- Anna Netrebko, Soprano, Metropolitan Opera, and the Mariinsky Opera
- Elena Obraztsova, Mezzo-Soprano, Voice Coach at the Bolshoi Theater, Founder of the Elena Obraztsova Competition
- Veronika Part, Principal Dancer, American Ballet Theatre
- Sasha Pivovarova, supermodel
- Evgeny Platov, figure skater
- Viktor Petrenko, figure skater
- Matthew Polenzani, Tenor, Metropolitan Opera
- Ekaterina Semenchuk, Mezzo-Soprano, Metropolitan Opera
- Anton Sikharulidze, Figure Skater, Gold Medalist at the 2002 Winter Olympics, Silver Medalist at the 1998 Winter Olympics
- Ignat Solzhenitsyn, Pianist, music director of the Chamber Orchestra of Philadelphia
- Daniel Ulbricht, Principal Dancer, New York City Ballet
- Rolando Villazón, Tenor, Metropolitan Opera
- Diana Vishneva, Prima Ballerina, American Ballet Theatre, Kirov Ballet
- Johnny Weir, Olympic Figure Skater and TV Personality
- Alexei Yashin, Professional Hockey Player, Russian Super League

== Board of directors ==
- President and chief executive officer, Vladimir Fekula, Director and Manager, Credit Review and Risk Management Department, Credit Suisse First Boston (ret.)
- Chairman of the Board, Dr. Igor P. Holodny, Director of Radiation Safety and assistant professor of Clinical Radiology at Columbia Presbyterian Medical Center (ret.)
- Treasurer, John L. Pouschine, managing director, Pouschine Cook Capital Management, LLC
- Peter A. Basilevsky, Partner, Satterlee Stephens Burke & Burke LLP
- Beatrice M. Fekula, Volunteer, Lenox Hill Hospital
- Dr. Cyril E. Geacintov, President and CEO, DRG International, Inc.
- Michael A. Jordan, Senior Vice President, Alfama Capital Markets
- Nadia Lipsky, Vice President of Marketing and Product Development, Innovative Health Management, LLC
- Thomas McPartland, Executive Vice President, and Board Director, ELMA Philanthropies Services (U.S.), Inc.
- Georges Nahitchevansky, Partner, Kilpatrick Stockton LLP
- Serge M. Ossorguine, President and Founder, Serge Audio, Inc.
- Raisa Scriabine, Executive Producer, LinkTV and President, Scriabine Foundation.
- Peter Tcherepnine, President, Loeb Partners Management, Inc.

Honorary Directors

- Dmitri Hvorostovsky, Baritone, Metropolitan Opera
- Suzanne Massie, Author
- Anna Netrebko, Soprano, Opera, Metropolitan Opera
- Maestro Yuri Temirkanov, music director and Chief Conductor of the St. Petersburg Philharmonic Orchestra; Guest Conductor of the Danish National Symphony Orchestra; Conductor Laureate of the Royal Philharmonic Orchestra in London
- Dr. Eugene S. Troubetzkoy, Vice President, Blue Sky Studios, Inc.; former president, Russian Children's Welfare Society
- Diana Vishneva, Prima Ballerina of the Mariinsky Theater Ballet and the American Ballet Theatre
