= Teaching to See =

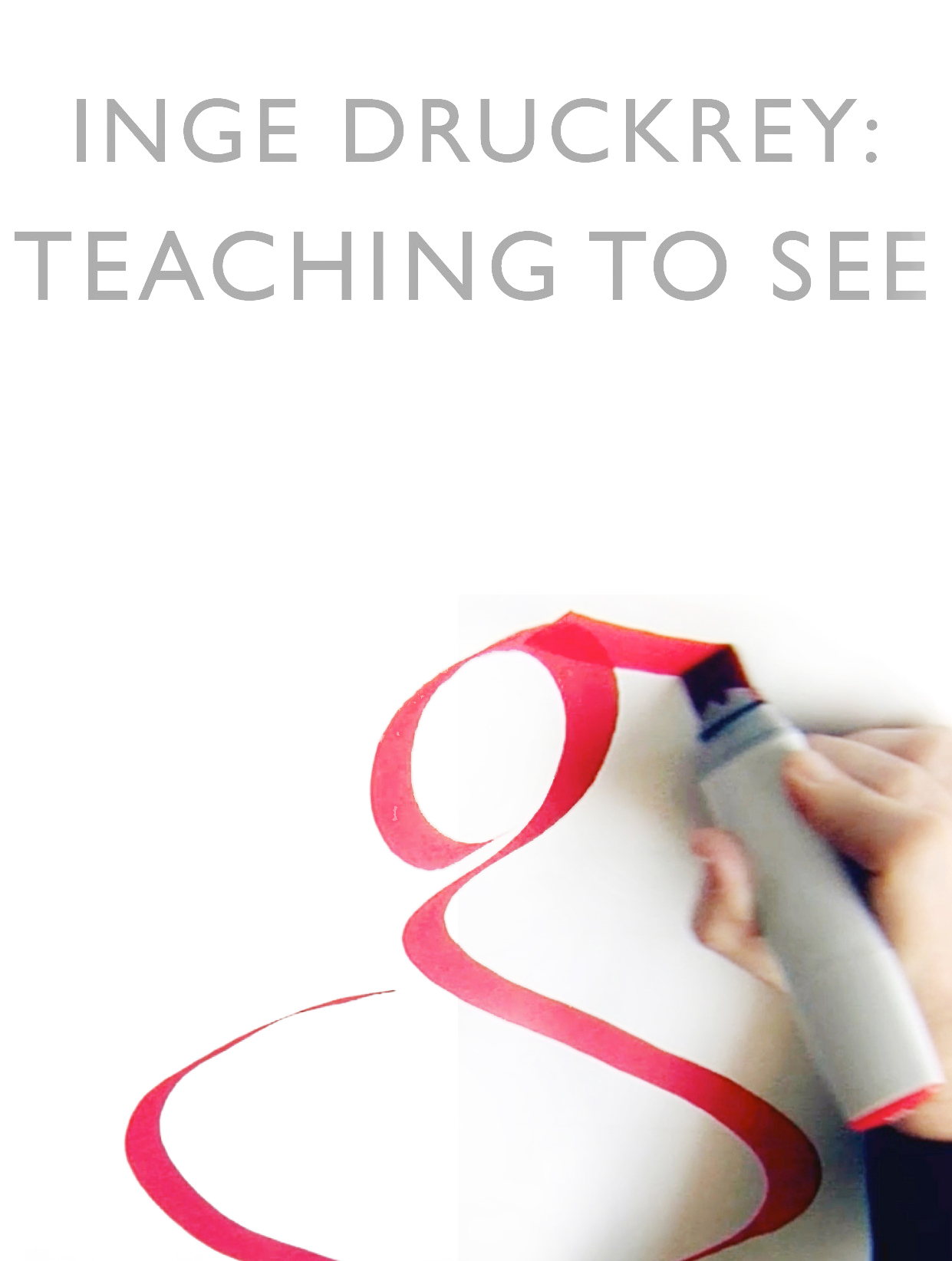
- film poster
- Directed by: Andrei Severny
- Produced by: Edward Tufte
- Narrated by: Inge Druckrey
- Cinematography: Andrei Severny; Peter Lorsch
- Edited by: Andrei Severny; Giacomo Ciminello
- Music by: Mozart; Beethoven; Bach; Chopin; Clementi; Michael Levy
- Production company: Graphics Press
- Release date: July 15, 2012
- Running time: 37 minutes
- Country: United States
- Language: English

Teaching to See is a 2012 educational documentary film about graphic design and the work of designer Inge Druckrey, and some of her students and colleagues. Directed by Andrei Severny and produced by Edward Tufte, it was released in July 2012 and was screened in New York, Boston, Phoenix, Toronto, Reykjavík, Philadelphia, Stanford, and New Haven.

The film covers various topics and principles, including graphic design, typography, composition, form and visual arts education.

== Interviewees ==
- Inge Druckrey
- Kris Holmes
- Ken Carbone
- Chris Myers
- Nancy Mayer
- Nora Hillman Goeler

== Critical reception ==
In 2012 Matthew Carter wrote about the film: "This film is about patient and dedicated teaching, about learning to look and visualize in order to design, about the importance of drawing. There are simple phrases that give insights into complex matters, for example that letterforms are 'memories of motion'."

FastCompany writer Kyle Vanhemert claimed "the film opens the eyes to the design details around you." In her article "Learn to See Like an Artist" at Lifehacker Melanie Pinola called it a "beautifully made film." She wrote "Whether you're an aspiring artist or not, the video can teach you how to really look, notice and appreciate design details, and become more critical and curious in the process." Sean Blanda at Behance 99U wrote "watch the first five minutes and you’ll be hooked."
