= Disparaît, v =

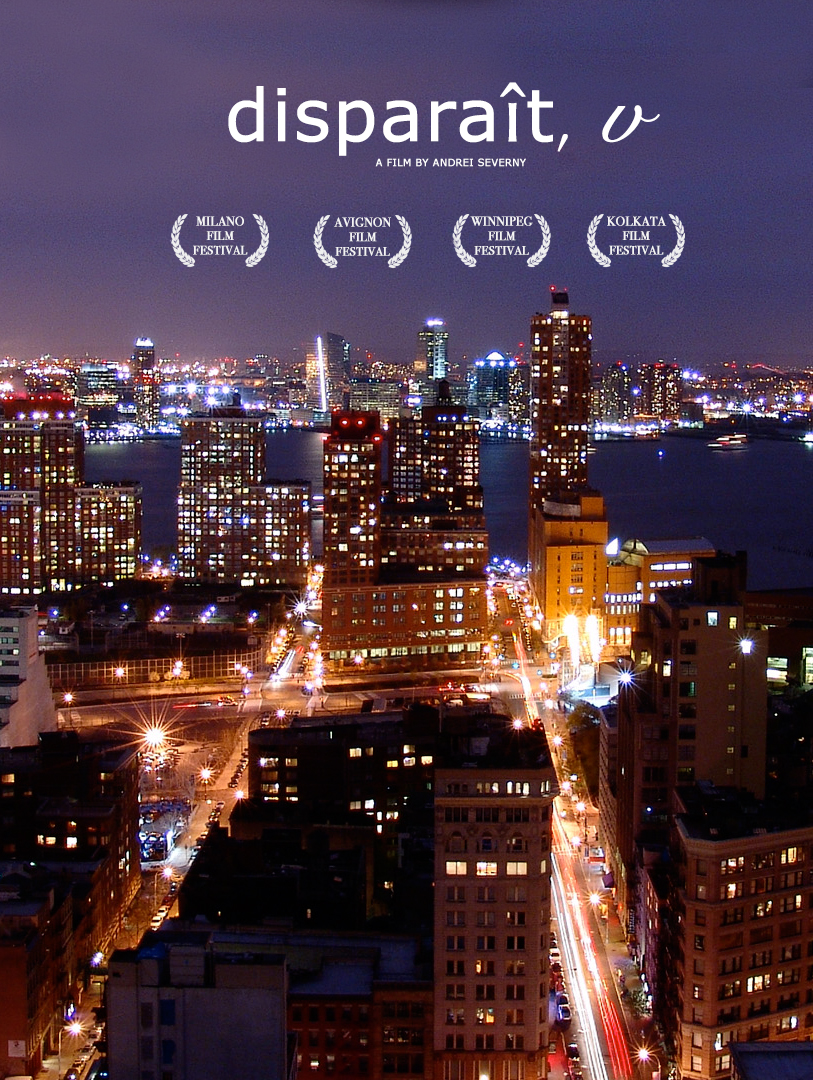
- Directed by: Andrei Severny
- Written by: Andrei Severny
- Produced by: Andrei Severny
- Starring: Rawle Roberts; Julie Arrue; Andrei Severny
- Cinematography: Andrei Severny
- Edited by: Andrei Severny
- Music by: Philip Glass
- Release date: September 5, 2005 (Milano Film Festival)
- Running time: 5 minutes
- Countries: Russia, USA, Japan, UK
- Languages: English, French

Disparaît, v is a 2005 experimental science fiction film, directed by Andrei Severny. The film combines 16 mm film with early digital video. "Disparaît, v" was part of the official selection at Milano Film Festival in 2005 and 2013, Avignon Film Festival, MECAL Film Festival, and Kolkata Film Festival.

It was distributed and screened in Italy by Esterni re-distribution in 2005-2012. The film was shot on location in New York City.

== Synopsis ==
Guided by a distant voice on the phone, Jack has less than twelve hours to make his way through the city before something drastic changes his whole life. The story of the final journey set in the urban environment resolves with Jack s girlfriend leading him to the mystery of complete disappearance from this world.
