= Contextual deep linking =

Contextual deep linking is a mobile linking method that directs users to a specific location within an app while passing associated data, such as referral or contextual information.

== Contextual linking in SEO ==
Contextual linking refers to embedding relevant links naturally within the content of a webpage. These links are seen as high-quality by search engines because they enhance the user experience by providing additional, related information. Unlike random links or those in footers or sidebars, contextual links are directly connected to the content around them.

Google's algorithms prioritize relevance and user experience, so contextual links are considered more valuable for SEO. By integrating meaningful links into the body of the content, website owners can improve their site's authority and search engine ranking. Internal contextual links help with site navigation and distribute page authority, while external contextual links to authoritative sites help build credibility.

== Contextual linking in affiliate marketing ==
For affiliate marketers, contextual linking serves a dual purpose: improving SEO performance and boosting conversion rates. By embedding affiliate links within relevant content, these links feel more organic and helpful to the reader, making them more likely to be clicked.

Contextual linking in affiliate marketing can be particularly effective in product reviews, comparison posts, and resource lists, where links to related products or services guide readers through a natural buying journey. By offering valuable, relevant links, affiliate marketers can increase their chances of driving sales while enhancing the overall user experience. Balancing internal and external contextual links also strengthens the strategy, ensuring content is both engaging and profitable..

== Contextual linking in mobile apps ==
Contextual deep linking is a form of deep linking for mobile apps that links to specific content within an app, rather than a generic welcome screen for that app. Where basic mobile deep linking typically only allows you to deep link to content in apps you’ve already downloaded, contextual deep linking allows you to pass information through the app store. Referring information is passed through both the App Store (iOS) and Google Play, bringing the user to the content of the links within the app whether or not the app has been previously installed.
