= Context (festival) =

Festival of modern choreography

Context. Diana Vishneva
- Frequency: Annual
- Locations: Moscow and St.Petersburg, Russia
- Inaugurated: 2013
- Website: contextfest.com

Context. Diana Vishneva is an annual international festival of modern choreography, held since 2013 under the direction of its founder and art director, prima ballerina of the Mariinsky Theater Diana Vishneva. The program of the festival includes performances by world-class choreographers and dance companies, productions by young Russian choreographers, educational events and a film program.

== History ==
=== 2013 ===
The first festival Context. Diana Vishneva was held from 4 to 6 December 2013 in Moscow. Diana Vishneva’s performance in a duet with Marcelo Gomes, a premiere of the American Ballet Theatre, became the key event of the festival. They performed Vertigo choreographed by Mauro Bigonzetti to the music of Shostakovich and Nuages by Jiří Kylián to the music of Claude Debussy. The first festival was presented by productions of Richard Alston Dance Company (UK), Suzanne Dellal Center for Dance and Theater (Israel), Introdans (Netherlands), Gauthier Dance (Germany), Korzo Productions (Netherlands)

=== 2014 ===
The second Context festival was held in Moscow from November 26 to 29, 2014. It was four days longer than in 2013. The participants in the international program were: Nederlands Dans Theater [NDT II] (Netherlands), Gauthier Dance (Germany), Ate9 dANCE cOMPANY (United States), Ballet Preljocaj (France), Nanine Linning / Theater Heidelberg (Netherlands).

Diana Vishneva performed almost in all the festival’s productions: ‘The Old Man and Me’ by Hans van Manen (partner — Erik Gautier), Subject of Change by Sol León & Paul Lightfoot (partner — Andrey Merkuriev), Tué by Marco Goecke.

=== 2015 ===
The third festival, dedicated to the memory of Maya Plisetskaya, was held in Moscow from November 24 to November 28, 2015. Such venues as Mossovet Theater, Stanislavsky Electrotheater, Gogol Center and Documentary Film Center hosted more than 30 events of the festival which lasted for five days.

That year the Martha Graham Dance Company, established by one of the founders of modern dance Martha Graham, was invited to Russia for the first time by the festival. The international program of the festival was presented by Introdans (Netherlands), Brenda Angiel Aerial Dance Company (Argentina) and an Israeli choreographer Itzik Galili. Diana Vishneva made her debut in the production of Live by Hans van Manen.

=== 2016 ===
In 2016 the festival Context expanded its geography and was held from November 14 to 19 in Moscow and St. Petersburg, where the gala closing took place at the historical stage of the Mariinsky Theater. The festival included three programs in the theater plus the film and the educational programs.

The key event of the gala evenings of the festival was the performance of Diana Vishneva and Aurélie Dupont, the artistic director of the Paris Opera Ballet Company. They performed the production of choreographer Ohad Naharin B/olero to the music of Maurice Ravel in the arrangement of Isao Tomita.

The participants of the international program were Béjart Ballet (Switzerland), Tanz Luzerner Theater (Switzerland), Alonzo King LINES Ballet (USA), Introdans (Netherlands).

=== 2017 ===
In 2017, the fifth festival was held from November 12 to 19. In the anniversary year Goyo Montero, the head and chief ballet master of Nuremberg Ballet, created and presented the Asunder ballet to Wagner's music (arranged by Uri Caine), Chopin (adapted by Owen Belton) and Belton's original music, performed by the best dancers of the Perm Opera and Ballet Theatre. The festival expanded its educational program and launched a series of lectures ‘What is modern dance?’ developed together with Arzamas and Sberbank.

Alessandra Ferri (Italy) and Herman Cornejo (Argentina), Gauthier Dance / Dance Company Theaterhaus Stuttgart (Germany), Company Wayne McGregor (United Kingdom), Bodytraffic (USA), Jeanette Delgado, Gonzalo Garcia (USA, Spain), Drew Jacoby and Matt Foley (USA), Dutch National Ballet participated in the international programme.

== Competition for young choreographers ==
The competition for young choreographers ‘Context’ was created to support and develop modern choreography in Russia.

The main thing is to help the talented Russian directors to take their place in this world. Classical ballet in Russia has great traditions, but the history of modern dance is being written today. We want to fit Russia into the context of the world's modern choreography.

— Diana Vishneva

Since 2013, in spring the festival starts accepting applications for the festival’s competition of young choreographers. Students of dance schools, choreographic colleges and institutes as well as choreographers who have already created several productions are invited to take part. At the initial stage of the contest, in summer, the curator of the competition Anastasia Yatsenko and art director of the festival Diana Vishneva select several finalists. In autumn, during the festival, the finalists of the Contest showcase their works to the general audience in Moscow and St. Petersburg, as well as to the international jury.

The winners of the competition of young choreographers from 2013 to 2017:

- 2013 — Vladimir Barnabas and Constantine Keykhel
- 2014 — Lilia Burdinskaya
- 2015 — Konstantin Semenov
- 2016 — Olga Vasilyeva (Grand Prix), Pavel Glukhov (Audience Choice Award)
- 2017 — Olga Labovkina (Grand Prix), Yulia Korobeinikova (Audience Choice Award)

== Film program ==
Every year the festival presents a film program, during which documentary films about famous choreographers, performers and dance companies are shown at the Documentary Film Center.

In 2013, the Documentary Film Center hosted screenings of the films ‘Pina: Dance of Passion 3D’ by Wim Wenders, as well as Car Men and ‘Between the Input and Output’ by Boris Paval Konen.

One of the central films of the festival’s film program in 2014 was ‘Ballet boys’ directed by Kevin Elvebak, a film about the difficult way of becoming the students of the ballet school. ‘Before We Go’ by George Leon, ‘Forward (Avant)’ by Juan Alvarez Neme, and ‘Everything is possible’ (Los posibles) by Santiago Mitre were also in the program.

Within the framework of the film program in 2015, some of the movies of the San Francisco Dance Film Festival were shown: ‘Rare Birds’ by T.M. Rives, ‘Never Stop’ by Ron Honsa, ‘The Man Behind the Scenes’ by Kersti Grunditz, ‘The Ballet Classes’ by Mary Jane Doherty, as well as the Russian premiere of Andrei Severny's film ‘Gravitation: Variations in Time and Space’ with Diana Vishneva in the leading role.

During the 2016 festival there were shown Reset by Thierry Demaizière and Alban Teurlai, 'Rudolph Nureyev - Dance to Freedom' by Richard Curson Smith, 'Alonzo King, the Poet of Dance' by Marita Stoker, 'Sasha Waltz: A Portrait' by Brigitte Kramer, ‘Mr. Gaga’ by Tomer Heymann and 'The choreographer Mats Ek' by Andreas Söderberg.

A documentary 'L'Opéra de Paris' by a Swiss director Jean-Stéphane Bron was first shown in Russia in 2017, within the framework of the festival’s film program. The film got the 'Best Documentary' award at the XXXIX Moscow International Film Festival. Other films shown in 2017 were 'A Ballerina's Tale' by Nelson George, 'Anatomy of a Male Ballet Dancer' by David Barba and Jamie Pellerito, 'Bobbi Jene' by Elvira Lind, 'Ingmar Bergman Through The Choreographer's Eye' by Ingmar Bergman Jr. and Marie-Louise Sid-Sylwander, 'Maiko: Dancing Child' by Åse Svenheim Drivenes and 'In California' by Charles Redon.

== Educational program ==
Educational program is an important part of the festival, it includes meetings with leading choreographers, lectures, master classes and a series of workshops.

Since 2013 there have been lectures by a theatrical and literary critic Vadim Gayevsky and a ballet critic and theoretician Leila Guchmazov, as well as creative masterclasses of a Swedish choreographer Mats Ek, a Russian choreographer Alexei Ratmansky and others.

In 2016 the festival launched specialized courses of workshops: there were the ‘Laboratory of Dance Criticism’ for the critics-to-be by Vita Khlopova, the researcher of contemporary dance and the founder of the portal No fixed points, and ‘Theatrical shooting’ workshop by Mark Olich [29] for the photographers.

In 2017, together with the British Council and the dance company Studio Wayne McGregor, the Context Festival launched a two-day intensive course (November 13–14) for choreographers from all over Russia. Following the results of the work of the Mind and Movement laboratory, seven choreographers received a grant from Studio Wayne McGregor and the British Council to create their own choreographic work using the method of British choreographer Wayne McGregor. Their names were announced In January 2018.

== The team of the festival ==
Art director Diana Vishneva is responsible for the creative plans of Context: she makes out an international program, selects participants for the contest of young choreographers Context Lab, and drafts the educational and film programs. All other issues are managed by the Festival's General Director Sofya Kapkova and her team.

== Links ==
- Official site of the festival
