= Contextualization =

Contextualization may refer to:

- Contextualization (Bible translation), the process of contextualising the biblical message as perceived in the missionary mandate originated by Jesus
- Contextualization (computer science), an initialization phase setting or overriding properties having unknown or default values at the time of template creation
- Contextualization (sociolinguistics), the use of language and discourse to signal relevant aspects of an interactional or communicative situation
- Contextualism, a collection of views in philosophy which argue that actions or expressions can only be understood in context

== See also ==
- Context (disambiguation)
