= La Tosca =

Play by Victorien Sardou

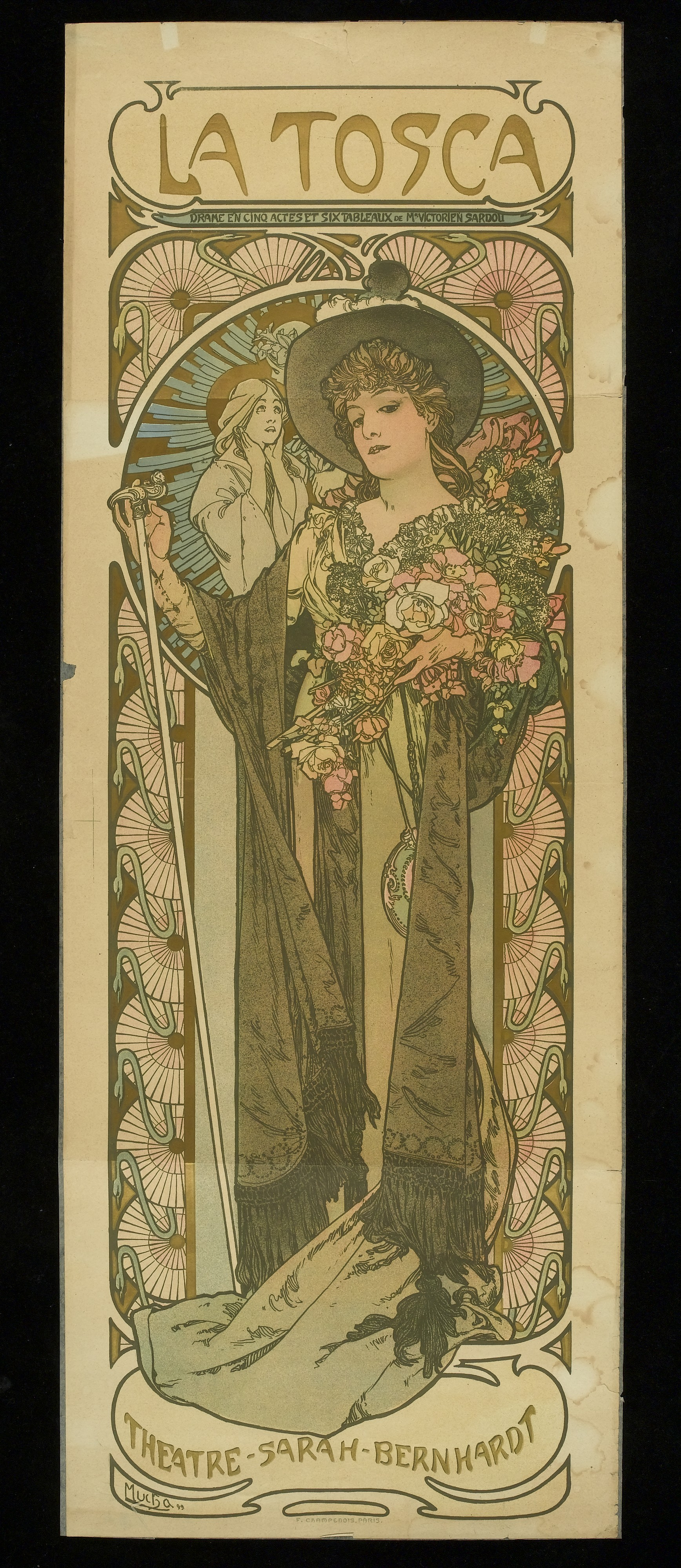
- Poster by Alphonse Mucha depicting Sarah Bernhardt in the title role
- Original language: French
- Written by: Victorien Sardou
- Genre: Historical drama
- Setting: Rome, 17 June 1800

Premiere
- Date: 24 November 1887
- Place: Théâtre de la Porte Saint-Martin, Paris

La Tosca is a five-act drama by the 19th-century French playwright Victorien Sardou. It was first performed on 24 November 1887 at the Théâtre de la Porte Saint-Martin in Paris, with Sarah Bernhardt in the title role. Despite negative reviews from the Paris critics at the opening night, it became one of Sardou's most successful plays and was toured by Bernhardt throughout the world in the years following its premiere. The play itself had dropped from the standard theatrical repertoire by the mid-1920s, but its operatic adaptation, Giacomo Puccini's Tosca, has achieved enduring popularity. There have been several other adaptations of the play including two for the Japanese theatre and an English burlesque, Tra-La-La Tosca (all of which premiered in the 1890s) as well as several film versions.

La Tosca is set in Rome on 17 June 1800 following the French victory in the Battle of Marengo. The action takes place over an eighteen-hour period, ending at dawn on 18 June 1800. Its melodramatic plot centers on Floria Tosca, a celebrated opera singer; her lover, Mario Cavaradossi, an artist and Napoleon sympathiser; and Baron Scarpia, Rome's ruthless Regent of Police. By the end of the play, all three are dead. Scarpia arrests Cavaradossi and sentences him to death in the Castel Sant'Angelo. He then offers to spare her lover if Tosca will yield to his sexual advances. She appears to acquiesce, but as soon as Scarpia gives the order for the firing squad to use blanks, she stabs him to death. On discovering that Cavaradossi's execution had in fact been a real one, Tosca commits suicide by throwing herself from the castle's parapets.

== Background and premiere ==
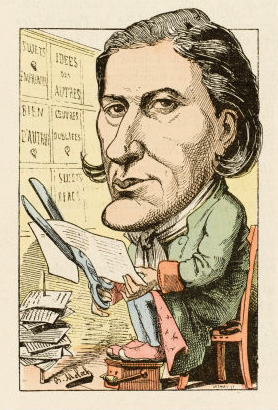
Sardou in an 1882 caricature from Le Trombinoscope

Victorien Sardou's grandfather had served as a surgeon with Napoleon's army in Italy, and Sardou retained a lifelong interest in the French Revolution and the French Revolutionary Wars. In addition to La Tosca, six of his other plays were set against the events of those times: Monsieur Garat (1860), Les Merveilleuses (1873), Thermidor (1891), Madame Sans-Gêne (1893), Robespierre (1899), and Pamela (1898). He was known for the historical research which he used to inform his plays and had a private research library of over 80,000 books including Piranesi's etchings of late 18th century Rome, where La Tosca is set.

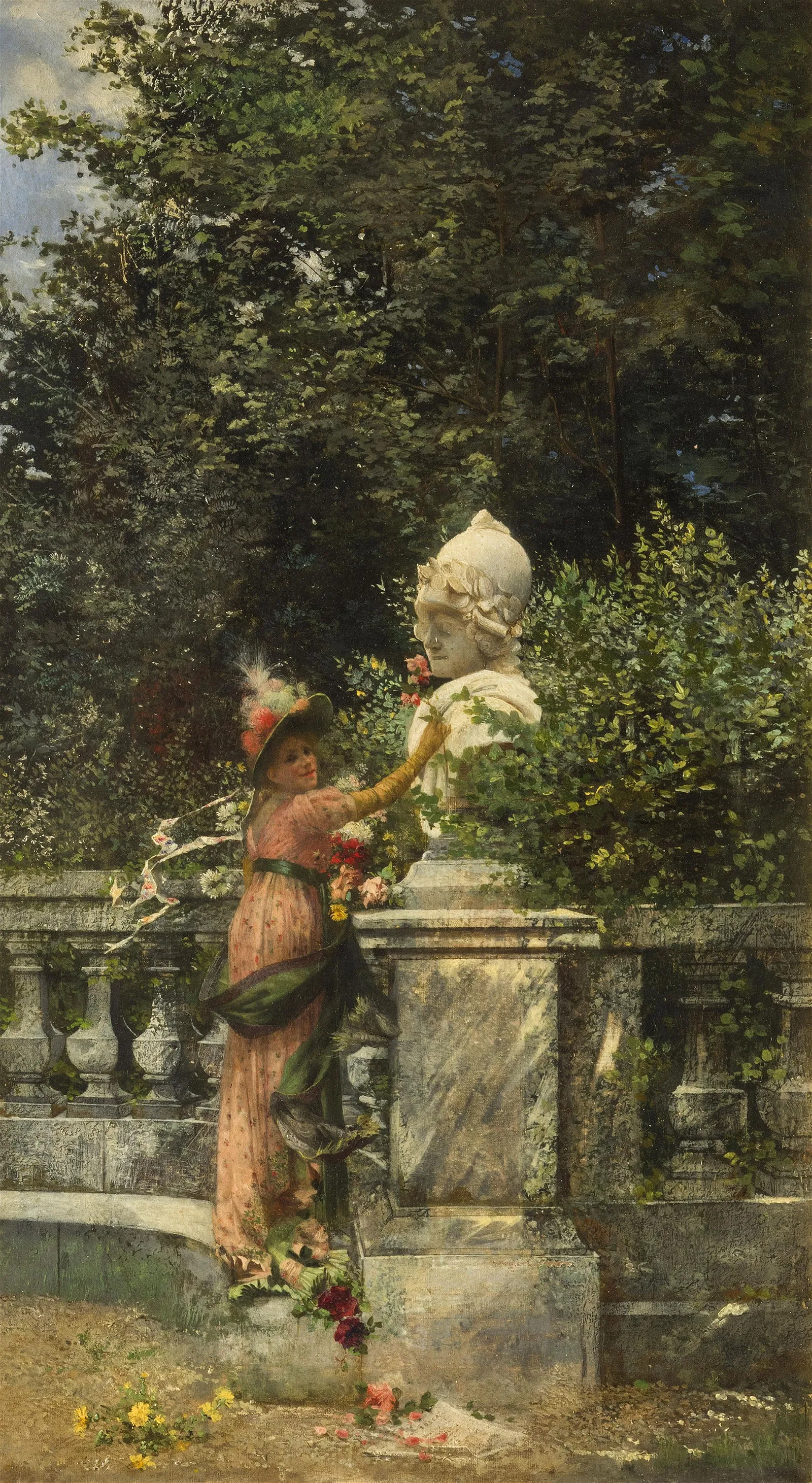
Pinckney Marcius-Simons, Sarah Bernhardt as La Tosca

Sardou wrote La Tosca specifically for Sarah Bernhardt. She was in her mid-40s by then and France's leading actress. In 1883, she had also taken over the lease on the Théâtre de la Porte Saint-Martin, where La Tosca was to premiere. It was the third play Sardou had written specifically for her. Both their first collaboration, Fédora (1882), and their second, Théodora (1884), had been highly successful. Pierre Berton, who played Baron Scarpia, had been Bernhardt's on and off lover for many years and a frequent stage partner. The elaborate sets for the production were made by a team of designers and painters who had worked with Sardou before: Auguste Alfred Rubé, Philippe Chaperon, Marcel Jambon, Enrico Robecchi, Alfred Lemeunier, and Amable Petit. The costumes were designed by Théophile Thomas, who also designed Sarah Bernhardt's costumes for Hugo's Ruy Blas, Sardou's Cléopâtre and Théodora, and Barbier's Jeanne d'Arc.

The period leading up to the premiere was not without problems. As had happened before, once word got out of a new Sardou play, another author would accuse him of plagiarism. In the 1882 caricature of Sardou (left), one of the signs on the wall states, "Idées des autres" ("Ideas of others") and another, "Bien d'auteur" ("Author's rights"). This time Ernest Daudet (a brother of Alphonse Daudet) made the accusation, claiming that four years earlier, he and Gilbert-Augustin Thierry had written a play, Saint Aubin, which takes place in Paris on the day after the Battle of Marengo (roughly the same time-setting as La Tosca) and whose heroine (like Tosca) is a celebrated opera singer. He also claimed that he had read the play to Sarah Bernhardt and Félix Duquesnel, the director of the Théâtre de la Porte Saint-Martin. Nevertheless, he said he would "graciously permit" Sardou's play to go ahead, and had brought up the issue solely to avoid being accused of plagiarism should Saint-Auban ever be produced. Sardou, in turn, issued a robust denial in the French papers. As the play neared its premiere, Bernhardt discovered to her fury that Sardou had sold the rights for the first American production of the play to the actress Fanny Davenport and threatened to walk out. Bernhardt was eventually pacified and rehearsals continued.

The Théâtre de la Porte Saint-Martin was packed for the opening night on 24 November 1887, although many in the audience already knew the ending before the curtain went up. While journalists were usually invited to dress-rehearsals, they were expected not to publish details of the play before the premiere. However, the Parisian journal, Gil Blas, had published a complete description of the plot on the morning of 24 November. (Following the premiere, Sardou brought a successful suit for damages against the paper.) At the end of the performance, Pierre Berton (Scarpia) came on stage for the customary presentation of the author to the audience. As he began his introduction, a large part of the audience interrupted him shouting, "Bernhardt, Bernhardt!" After three failed attempts, he went backstage and asked Bernhardt to come out. She refused to do so until Sardou had been introduced. Berton finally succeeded, after which Bernhardt appeared to thunderous applause and cries of "Vive Sarah!"

== Characters ==
Queen Maria Carolina

Three minor characters in La Tosca are real historical figures: Queen Maria Carolina; Prince Diego Naselli, the Governor of Rome; and the composer, Giovanni Paisiello. However, their treatment in the play is not always historically accurate. On the day the play takes place, Queen Maria Carolina was actually on her way to Austria and staying in Livorno, not Rome. Paisiello was a Neapolitan court composer, but at the time of the play he was under suspicion for anti-Royalist sympathies, making him a highly unlikely candidate for Maria Carolina's gathering in Act 2. According to Deborah Burton, another minor character, Princesse Orlonia, is probably based on Princess Torlonia. Although their names and backgrounds contain historical allusions, the four main protagonists, Cesare Angelotti, Mario Cavaradossi, Floria Tosca, and Baron Scarpia are fictional. Their backgrounds are revealed in the conversations between Angelotti and Cavaradossi in Acts 1 and 3.

Camille Dumény as Mario Cavaradossi, complete with his "revolutionary's mustache"

Cesare Angelotti had been a wealthy landowner in Naples and defender of the short-lived Neapolitan Republic. When it fell to the British forces and Ferdinand IV was returned as ruler, he fled to Rome where he became one of the Consuls of the equally short lived Roman Republic. He is a wanted man, not only for his revolutionary activities but also for a youthful dalliance in London, where he had an eight-day liaison with Emma Hamilton. In those days she had been a prostitute going by the name of Emma Lyon, but by the time of the play she had become the wife of the British Envoy to Naples, William Hamilton, and was a favourite of Queen Maria Carolina. Determined to avoid a scandal, the Queen demanded that he be returned to Naples and hanged. He was languishing in Rome's Castel Sant'Angelo, when his sister Giulia, the Marquise Attavanti, helped him to escape. According to historian Susan Vandiver Nicassio, Angelotti was partly based on Liborio Angelucci, who had briefly been a Consul of the Roman Republic, although the resemblance in terms of their life histories ends there. Another influence on the choice of surname may have been Nicola Antonio Angeletti (1791–1870), a prominent Italian revolutionary and member of the Carbonari.

Mario Cavaradossi is descended from an old Roman family, but was born in France, where his father had lived most of his life. The family still had a palazzo on the Piazza di Spagna in Rome and once owned the country villa which Cavaradossi now rents. His father had strong ties with Diderot and d'Alembert, and his mother was a grand-niece of the French philosopher Helvétius. Cavaradossi studied art in Paris with Jacques-Louis David and lived in David's atelier during the French Revolution. When he visited Rome in 1800 to settle his father's estate, he met and fell in love with the celebrated opera singer Floria Tosca, and decided to prolong his stay. He soon gained a reputation as a free-thinker and Bonapartist. Even his mustache was suspect. Tosca's confessor told her it marked him as a revolutionary. To deflect these suspicions, he offered to do a painting in the church of Sant'Andrea al Quirinale for free. Nicassio has speculated that one of the influences on Sardou's choice of name was the extremely similar name Caravadossi, a noble Italian family from Nice, the birthplace of Garibaldi, and at several points in its history under Italian control. One of the Caravadossi descendants fought in the 19th century Italian Wars of Independence.

Floria Tosca is an orphan from Verona, where she had been found as a child, roaming the hillsides and herding sheep. The Benedictine monks took her in and educated her. The convent organist gave her singing lessons, and by the time she was sixteen, her church performances had made her a local celebrity. The composer Domenico Cimarosa went to hear her and wanted her to go on stage. The monks opposed this, but after she was presented to the Pope, he too declared that she should become an opera singer. Four years later she made her debut in the title role of Paisiello's Nina and went on to sing at La Scala, La Fenice, and the Teatro San Carlo to great acclaim. When Cavaradossi met her she was singing at the Teatro Argentina in Rome. As soon as her engagement at the theatre was over, she and Cavaradossi planned to leave for Venice, where she had a contract to sing at La Fenice. Sardou took a long time to decide on her name and may have finally been influenced by Saint Tosca, who is particularly revered in Verona. The 8th-century church dedicated to her there is one of the oldest in the Veneto region.

Baron Vitellio Scarpia is from Sicily, where he was known for his ruthless law enforcement. When Naples took control of Rome in 1799, he was appointed the city's Regent of Police, and quickly gained a reputation for the cruelty and licentiousness that lay beneath his seemingly courteous exterior. Angelotti characterises him as a religious hypocrite and an "impure satyr" from whom no woman is safe. Before Scarpia set his sights on Floria Tosca, he had tried to force himself on Angelotti's sister, who fled from him in terror. According to Nicassio, Sardou may have chosen his name for its similarity to "Sciarpa", the nickname of Gherardo Curci, a bandit who led irregular troops fighting on behalf of the monarchy in Naples and was made a baron by Ferdinand IV in 1800.

=== Original cast ===
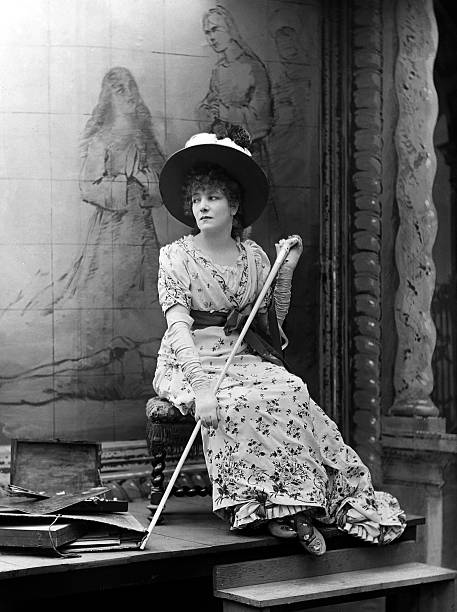
Sarah Bernhardt as Floria Tosca in her costume for Act 1

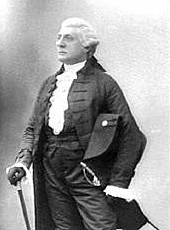
Pierre Berton as Baron Scarpia

Character	Original cast 24 November 1887
Floria Tosca, a celebrated opera singer	Sarah Bernhardt
Mario Cavaradossi, an artist and Tosca's lover	Camille Dumény
Baron Vitellio Scarpia, Rome's Regent of Police	Pierre Berton
Cesare Angelotti, former Consul of the Roman Republic and a fugitive	Rosny
Marquis Attavanti, Neapolitan courtier and Angelotti's brother-in-law	Émile Francès
Eusèbe, sacristan of Sant'Andrea al Quirinale	Pierre Lacroix
Vicomte de Trévilhac, a French aristocrat in exile	Violet
Capréola, an aristocrat	Joliet
Trevulce, gentleman companion to the Marquise Giulia Attavanti	Deschamps
Spoletta, Captain of the riflemen	Prosper Étienne Bouyer
Schiarrone, a policeman	Piron
Paisiello, the court composer	Félicia Mallet
Gennarino, Cavaradossi's manservant	Suzanne Seylor (en travesti)
Reine Marie Caroline, Queen of Naples	Bauché
Princesse Orlonia, a lady at Marie Caroline's court	Marie Auge
Luciana, Tosca's maid	Durand
Ceccho, the caretaker at Cavaradossi's country villa	Gaspard
Diego Naselli, Prince of Aragon and Governor of Rome	Delisle
Huissier (usher)	Dumont
Colometti, Scarpia's servant	Jégu
Sergeant	Besson
Procureur fiscal (public prosecutor)	Cartereau

== Synopsis ==
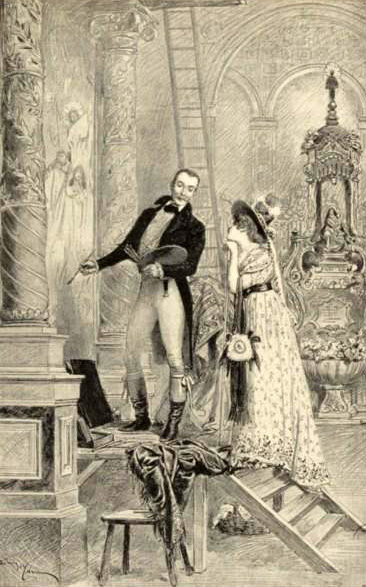
Tosca and Cavaradossi in Act 1 of La Tosca (Le Théâtre illustrée, 1887)

=== Historical context ===
La Tosca is set against the background of the French Revolutionary Wars, the establishment of the Roman Republic, and its subsequent fall in 1799 when the French withdrew from Rome. Following the French withdrawal, Rome was controlled by the Kingdom of Naples, supported by the British and Austrians. However, the fighting continued elsewhere in Italy. The French troops had been defeated by the Austrians at the Siege of Genoa on 4 June 1800. Then on 14 June 1800, three days before the play begins, Napoleon's troops fought the Austrian forces at the Battle of Marengo. Although out-numbered, the French were ultimately victorious, despite early reports to the contrary. News of the surprise victory reached Rome on 17 June, the time setting for the play.

=== Act 1 ===
The church of Sant'Andrea al Quirinale in Rome on the afternoon of 17 June 1800

Gennarino (Cavaradossi's manservant) and Eusèbe (the sacristan) discuss Cavaradossi's relationship with Tosca, his Republican and Bonapartist sympathies, and the apparent defeat of the French army at Marengo. Cavaradossi arrives to work on his painting of Mary Magdalen. When Gennarino and Eusèbe leave, Angelotti, a Republican fugitive who has escaped from the Castel Sant'Angelo emerges from his hiding place in his family's chapel. His sister, the Marquise Attavanti, had visited the day before to leave him supplies and women's clothes to disguise himself, including a fan to hide his face. Cavaradossi recalls seeing a beautiful blond woman in the church the previous day and tells how she inspired his painting. Tosca arrives and Angelotti quickly returns to his hiding place. Tosca, who is dark-haired, becomes jealous when she sees Cavaradossi's painting of a blonde woman, but he reassures her of his love. After she departs, Cavaradossi and Angelotti quickly leave for Cavaradossi's country villa. Baron Scarpia and his police enter the church searching for Angelotti. Scarpia finds the fan left by the Marquise Attavanti and keeps it. Worshippers arrive for the Te Deum which has been ordered to give thanks for the French defeat.

=== Act 2 ===
A large chamber in the Farnese Palace on the evening of 17 June 1800

At the gambling tables, Vicomte de Trévilhac, Capréola, Trevulce and the Marquis Attavanti (all supporters of the Kingdom of Naples), discuss the French defeat at Genoa earlier that month, their apparent defeat at Marengo, and the disappearance of Angelotti and Cavaradossi. Princesse Orlonia and other ladies of the court join them. All discuss the cantata by Paisiello which Tosca will sing later that evening as part of the victory celebrations. Baron Scarpia arrives and there is further discussion of Angelotti's escape, cut short by the arrival of Tosca. Queen Marie Caroline enters for the performance of the cantata accompanied by Paisiello, Prince Diego Naselli, courtiers, musicians, Austrian army officers, and monsignors. She reiterates her demand that Scarpia capture Angelotti and have him hanged. Scarpia must now find the fugitive's hiding place as quickly as possible. Hoping to provoke Tosca into leading him to Cavaradossi and Angelotti, he takes her aside and shows her the Marquise Attavanti's fan, intimating that she and Cavaradossi are lovers. Tosca is overcome with jealousy. As the cantata performance is about to begin, couriers arrive with a letter announcing that the French had been victorious at the Battle of Marengo after all. The Queen faints. Tosca throws the pages of her score into the air and rushes out with her maid. Scarpia orders his men to follow her carriage.

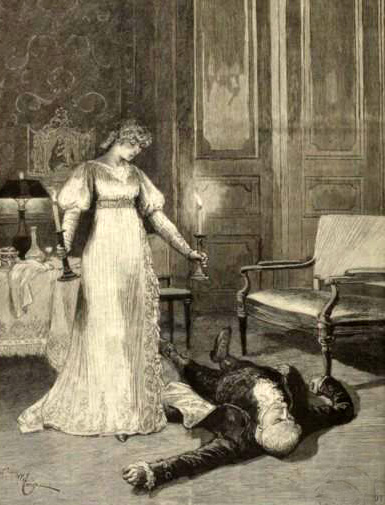
Tosca places candles by Scarpia's body in Act 4 of La Tosca (Le Théâtre illustrée, 1887)

=== Act 3 ===
Cavaradossi's country villa on the night of 17 June 1800

Cavaradossi tells Angelotti of a chamber in an ancient Roman well on the property where he can hide until he makes his escape. It had been used by one of Cavaradossi's ancestors when he fled Rome after stabbing a Medici. Tosca arrives to confront her lover about the fan Scarpia had shown her. Cavaradossi and Angelotti explain everything and she realizes with horror that she has been duped into leading Scarpia to them. On hearing the arrival of Scarpia and his men, Angelotti seeks refuge in the well. Scarpia demands to know where Angelotti is hidden. When Tosca and Cavaradossi refuse to tell, Cavaradossi is taken off to be interrogated by the Procureur and tortured by Scarpia's assistant if he refuses to answer. Scarpia describes the torture device in great detail to Tosca, who is then made to listen to her lover's screams. Unable to bear it any longer, she reveals the hiding place, much to Cavaradossi's fury. Rather than be captured, Angelotti takes poison concealed in his ring. Scarpia orders his men to take Cavaradossi to the Castel Sant'Angelo for execution and orders Tosca to be brought there as well.

=== Act 4 ===
Scarpia's apartments in the Castel Sant'Angelo in the hours of darkness before the dawn of 18 June 1800

Scarpia is eating supper in a room lit only by two candles and a candelabrum on his table. There is a prayer stool and a crucifix in an alcove near his bed. He orders Tosca, who has been locked in another room of the castle, to be brought to him. When she arrives, he tells her that Cavaradossi is to be hanged at dawn. He also tells her of his intense attraction to her and offers to spare Cavaradossi if she agrees to sleep with him. Tosca calls him a wild animal and repels his advances in disgust, which only serves to increase his desire. Scarpia then takes her to the window and shows her the scaffold awaiting her lover. Tosca finally says that she will agree to his terms, but only after she has proof that Cavaradossi will be spared. Scarpia calls in Spoletta and in front of Tosca instructs him to stage a mock execution by firing squad with blanks in the riflemen's guns. After Spoletta leaves, Tosca demands that Scarpia also give her a document granting safe conduct out of the Roman States. As soon as he signs the document and starts to kiss her, she grabs a knife from the supper table and stabs Scarpia to death. Tosca removes the safe conduct from his hand and starts to leave, but then turns back. She places the two lighted candles on each side of Scarpia's body and puts the crucifix on his chest before quietly slipping out of the room.

The Castel Sant'Angelo depicted in the early 1800s by Sylvester Shchedrin

=== Act 5 ===
The chapel at the Castel Sant'Angelo and a platform on the roof of the castle at dawn on 18 June 1800

Spoletta and his men awaken Cavaradossi in the chapel where he is being held to tell him that he has a visitor. Tosca arrives and rushes into her lover's arms. She begs his forgiveness for having revealed Angelotti's hiding place, and he in turn asks forgiveness for his anger at the time. She explains that the execution will only be a mock one and they will be able to escape from Rome. Spoletta confirms this and leaves to prepare the firing squad. Alone with Cavaradossi, Tosca tells him that she has killed Scarpia. Spoletta returns to take Cavaradossi to the platform where the firing squad awaits and tells Tosca to remain behind. After a few minutes, Tosca goes out onto the platform and sees Cavaradossi lying on the ground. She turns him over and discovers that he is dead. The bullets were real. Spoletta reveals that he was in fact following Scarpia's orders which contained the coded message to shoot him "like we shot Count Palmieri". Distraught at Scarpia's betrayal, Tosca screams "And I cannot even kill him again!" At first Spoletta and Schiarrone think she has gone mad, but an officer arrives and confirms that Scarpia has been murdered. As Spoletta lunges towards her, Tosca climbs onto the castle parapets and throws herself off.

== Performance history ==
Fanny Davenport in costume for Act 1 of La Tosca in its American premiere

La Tosca had an opening run in Paris of 200 performances. Sarah Bernhardt, along with the original Cavaradossi (Camille Dumény) and Baron Scarpia (Pierre Berton), then starred in the London premiere in July 1888 at the Lyceum Theatre. She would continue to be closely associated with the play until well into the 20th century, touring it around the world from 1889, including performances in Egypt, Turkey, Australia and several countries in Latin America. It was during her 1905 tour to Rio de Janeiro that she injured her leg jumping from the parapets in the final scene. The wound never healed properly and ultimately led to amputation of her leg ten years later. Bernhardt gave the first American performance of La Tosca in the original French at New York's Garden Theater on 5 February 1891 and took the play to many other American cities, aways performing in French, even though on some occasions, the rest of the cast were performing in English. In Paris, she had revived the play in 1899 to inaugurate the Théâtre Sarah Bernhardt where it ran for 57 nights and starred in another major Parisian revival in 1909, six months to the day after Sardou's death.

La Tosca had its US premiere within four months of its Paris opening, performed in English translation with Fanny Davenport in the title role and her husband, Willet Melbourne MacDowell, as Cavaradossi. The "Davenport Tosca" opened in New York City on 3 March 1888 and inaugurated the luxurious new Broadway Theatre on 41st Street. Davenport had previously bought the rights to the American premiere of Sardou's Féodora, and had made a fortune from it. She bought the rights to the American premiere of La Tosca for 100,000 francs, before it had even premiered in Paris. As had happened at the Paris premiere, a charge of plagiarism was soon brought. Maurice Barrymore claimed that his 1884 play, Nadjezda, had been plagiarised by Sardou and sought an injunction to stop Davenport putting on further performances of La Tosca. According to Barrymore, he had given a copy of his play to Sarah Bernhardt in 1885, and she had then given it to Sardou. In affidavits read out in court Bernhardt said that she had never seen the play and knew nothing about it, and Sardou said that preliminary material for the play had been in his desk for fifteen years. In fact, Nadjezda's only resemblance to La Tosca comes from the unholy bargain the heroine makes to save her husband's life, similar to that of Tosca and Baron Scarpia. As Sardou pointed out in his affidavit, this plot device is a common one and had been notably used by Shakespeare in Measure for Measure. Davenport herself was in the courtroom on 27 April 1888 when the judge found in her favour. Following the New York run, she toured the play throughout the US with her company.

Tosca remained in Davenport's repertoire until the end of her career. After her death in 1898, her husband continued to tour the play with Blanche Walsh in the title role. Other prominent actresses who portrayed Floria Tosca in the play's heyday were the British actresses Fanny Bernard-Beere who performed the role in English at London's Garrick Theatre in 1889 and Ethel Irving who was still playing the role in 1920; the American actress Cora Urquhart Potter who toured the play in Australia and New Zealand; and the Italian actresses, Teresa Boetti Valvassura and Italia Vivanti (a cousin of Eleonora Duse). After the mid-1920s, revivals of the play became increasingly sporadic. It was performed in Canada by La Comédie de Montréal in 1941 starring Sita Riddez, and an English version adapted by Norman Ginsbury was broadcast on the BBC Home Service in 1958, but by then the play itself had completely disappeared from the standard theatrical repertoire.

== Reception ==
Pierre Berton as Baron Scarpia in a cartoon from Punch (21 July 1888) where his performance in the London premiere of La Tosca was described as "stagey and old-fashioned" in contrast to the naturalness of Sarah Bernhardt.

Considered by Jerome Hart to be the most emotional of all Sardou's plays, La Tosca's critical reception was in sharp contrast to that of the opening night audience. The Parisian critics roundly attacked the play with Francisque Sarcey calling it a "pantomime", as did Jules Lemaître. Jules Favre writing in Les Annales politiques et littéraires called it a "vulgar piece, without intrigue, without characters, without morals". The New York Times correspondent reported the play's resounding success with the audience, but like many commentators of the day, including Favre, largely attributed it to Sarah Bernhardt's powerful performance, noting that:

There is not much of play, a mere outline at best, made to fit like a glove the talent and personality of Bernhardt who is all and everything, but who should or could complain? The interest never slackens; there is enough dialogue and apropos to keep both gratification and amusement entertained, and the story enobles itself magically in the hands of the greatest living actress.

Writing from the perspective of the late 20th century, Nicassio agrees that Bernhardt's performance as a character essentially like herself, a celebrated, amorous, and temperamental diva, was undoubtedly a key factor in the play's success with the Paris audience. However, she cites other factors which also played a part: the "exotic" Italian setting with sumptuous sets and costumes, the play's anti-clerical themes, and a plot glorifying the Bonapartists as the 100th anniversary of the French Revolution approached.

Following the London premiere in 1888, Cecil Howard wrote that the play was even more popular there than it had been in Paris. Like several critics describing the Paris premiere, he devoted a large part of his review to Bernhardt's performance, which he said held the audience "breathless and rapt", but he had little admiration for Sardou's drama:

As to the play itself, I will only add that it is offensive in its morals, corrupt in its teaching, and revolting in its brutality, and yet everyone who admires acting is bound to see it.

The "unchaste" behaviour of the heroine and the violence and brutality depicted in the play, although relatively mild by modern standards, disturbed not only critics at the time, but also some play-goers. The audience's reaction to Tosca's suicide at the American premiere caused Fanny Davenport to change the ending in subsequent performances with the firing squad taking aim at Tosca while she grieves over Cavaradossi's lifeless body, an ending also used by Sarah Bernhardt when she performed the play in Fort Worth, Texas in 1892. William Winter went so far as to warn American women that La Tosca contained scenes which were "not only shocking to the nervous system and grossly offensive to persons of true sensibility, but which might inflict irreparable injury on persons yet unborn." Several early critics, including Arthur Bingham Walkley and Jules Lemaître, wrote at length on Scarpia's graphic description of Cavaradossi's torture and the sound of his off-stage screams in Act 3, which they considered both gratuitously violent and inartistic. However, this was not a view shared by Oscar Wilde, who found the torture scene moving in its depiction of "a terrible human tragedy". George Bernard Shaw intensely disliked all of Sardou's work, and not surprisingly characterised La Tosca, which he saw in London in 1890, as a "clumsily constructed, empty-headed turnip ghost of a cheap shocker", while presciently suggesting that it would make a good opera.

Despite the views of the critics, La Tosca proved to be phenomenally successful. It ultimately had 3000 performances in France alone, played in theatres all over the world for thirty years, and netted Sardou 500,000 francs. Sarah Bernhardt's costumes brought Empire silhouette dresses back into style, and the long walking stick she carried in Act 1 became a new fashion accessory. Both a leopard in a famous New York menagerie and an American race horse were named in honour of the play's heroine, as were numerous dishes, several of them created by the French chef, Auguste Escoffier, a devotee of Bernhardt.

== Adaptations ==
Arthur Roberts, who played Baron Scampia Scarpia, in the 1890 parody, Tra-La-La Tosca

The most famous adaptation of La Tosca was Giacomo Puccini's Italian opera Tosca which premiered in Rome on 14 January 1900 with Hariclea Darclée in the title role and went on to successful premieres in London, New York, and Paris. The Paris premiere at the Opéra-Comique in 1903 was performed in a French translation by Paul Ferrier with Sardou himself taking charge of the rehearsals. Unlike Sardou's play, Puccini's opera has achieved an enduring popularity. More than 100 years after its premiere, Tosca ranks sixth in the list of most frequently performed operas worldwide, and has over 100 commercial recordings as well as several film versions (see Tosca discography). Puccini had seen La Tosca in Italy when Bernhardt toured the play there and asked his publisher, Giulio Ricordi, to negotiate with Sardou for the adaptation rights. Before Puccini obtained the rights, the composers Alberto Franchetti and Giuseppe Verdi had both expressed interest in turning La Tosca into an opera, although Verdi thought the ending had to be changed. Puccini's librettists, Luigi Illica and Giuseppe Giacosa, likewise tried (unsuccessfully) to convince Sardou to accept a new ending, with Tosca going mad rather than committing suicide. The Sardou ending stayed, but Illica and Giacosa did make several significant changes to the play, primarily to tighten the action.

Earlier, La Tosca had been adapted into an English novel by Arthur D. Hall in 1888, and had two adaptations for traditional Japanese theatre, both performed in 1891. In the Japanese adaptations, the famed story-teller, San'yūtei Enchō, set the work during the period of the 1837 rebellion by Ōshio Heihachirō, while Fukuchi Gen'ichirō adapted the play for Kabuki theatre. There were at least four silent film adaptations. A hand-coloured version starring Sarah Bernhardt was made in 1906 by Le Film d'Art, a French film company run by André Calmettes and Charles le Bargy. Bernhardt was so displeased with her performance that she refused to allow its release and tried to buy up and destroy all the negatives. Le Bargy and Calmettes then re-filmed the work, this time with Cécile Sorel as Tosca, and released it in 1908. The Bernhardt version re-surfaced and was released in 1912 by Universal Pictures. There was also a 1918 version by Paramount Pictures with Pauline Frederick as Tosca. Only fragments remain of the Italian film made the same year starring Francesca Bertini. Later films tended to be adaptations of Puccini's opera rather than Sardou's play with the notable exception of Carl Koch's 1941 Italian film Tosca starring Imperio Argentina as Tosca and Rossano Brazzi as Cavaradossi. Jean Renoir originally worked with Koch on the adaptation, but had to leave Italy at the outbreak of World War II. The film was released in the US in 1947 as The Story of Tosca.

Shortly after the first London performances of La Tosca, Francis Burnand and the composer Florian Pascal wrote a musical parody of the play entitled Tra-la-la Tosca or The High-Toned Soprano and the Villain Bass. In their burlesque version, Tosca murders Scarpia in the "Cafe Romano allo Strando", stabbing him with a huge rolled-up restaurant bill and then places one of the dish covers over his face. Cavaradossi, instead, is executed by a phalanx of photographers. The show premiered at London's Royalty Theatre in January 1890 and ran for 45 performances, with the critic Cecil Howard pronouncing it one of Burnand's finest efforts. Burnand had previously parodied Sardou's Féodora as Stage-Doora (1883) and Théodora as The O'Dora (1885), both of which ran at Toole's Theatre in London. In 2004, Lucio Dalla composed an Italian musical, Tosca, Amore Disperato (Tosca, Desperate Love), based largely on the structure of Puccini's opera, but with elements from Sardou's play. The setting was updated to modern times with costumes by Giorgio Armani. Tosca, Amore Disperato continues to be performed in Italy and was broadcast on RAI television in June 2010.

Tosca's Act 1 costume designed by Hohenstein for the opera's premiere and virtually identical to Bernhardt's original.

=== Differences between Sardou's play and Puccini's opera ===
The number of characters is sharply reduced in the opera, and the work shortened to three acts, leaving out much of the political motivations of the protagonists. In the opera, Angelotti and Cavaradossi already know each other. In the play, they had never met before, thus allowing considerable scope to explain their histories and backgrounds to each other. The roles of Tosca's maid and Cavaradossi's two servants were eliminated as were most of the characters in Act 2, although some of them such as the Marquis Attavanti and Queen Maria Carolina are alluded to in the opera. The gathering at the Farnese Palace in the presence of Queen Maria Carolina, Act 2 of the play, was eliminated. The setting of Act 2 and the events of Acts 3 and 4 in the play were then combined into the second act of the opera, which involved several significant changes.

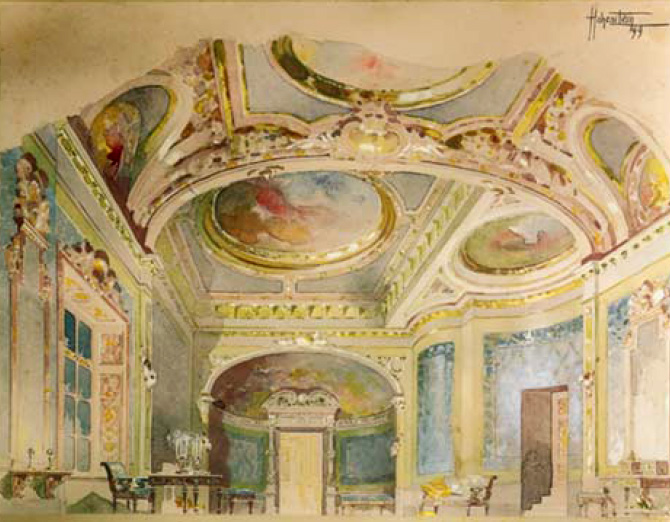
Hohenstein's set design for the Farnese Palace in the premiere production of Puccini's Tosca

Unlike the play, Scarpia shows Tosca the Marquise Attavanti's fan in Act 1, where Puccini's librettists contrive to have her return to the church following the departure of Angelotti and Cavaradossi. In the opera, both Cavaradossi's interrogation and torture and Scarpia's subsequent murder take place in the Farnese Palace. In the play, Cavaradossi's interrogation is set at his country house, where he was captured, while Scarpia's murder takes place at his apartment in the Castel Sant'Angelo. The news of the Austrian defeat at Marengo which formed the climax of Act 2 in La Tosca does not emerge in the opera until after Cavaradossi has been captured and tortured. Thus Scarpia is able to listen to Tosca's uninterrupted performance of the cantata (heard in a distant room of the palace).

Early audiences (especially in the United States and Britain) sometimes balked at the realism in Sardou's play, especially Cavaradossi's screams while he is being tortured off-stage. In Puccini's version, his screams are likewise heard by the audience. However his death by firing squad is even more explicit, occurring on stage in full view of the audience, rather than off stage as in the play. Tosca's final words before committing suicide in the play are addressed to Spoletta and his men. When he vows to send her to join her lover, she cries "J'y vais, canailles!" ("I am going, scoundrels!"). In the opera, her final words are addressed to Scarpia: "O Scarpia, avanti a Dio!" ("O Scarpia, [we meet] before God!"). The opera also gives Cavaradossi a soliloquy in the final act, "E lucevan le stelle" ("And the stars were shining"), in which he reflects on his past happiness with Tosca and his impending death. Other relatively minor changes include Puccini's addition of a singing shepherd boy as Cavaradossi awaits his execution and a change of the church in Act 1 from Sardou's Sant'Andrea al Quirinale to Puccini's Sant'Andrea della Valle. The latter actually has a potential hiding place for Angelotti. Its Barberini chapel incorporates a shallow chamber separated from the main part of the chapel by a grille.

== Sources ==
- Adams, William Davenport, A Book of Burlesque, Sketches of English Stage Travestie and Parody, Henry & Co., 1891
- Amazonas, Lee "Guerilla Cinematheque Comes of Age: The Pacific Film Archive", Chronicle of the University of California, Spring 2004, pp. 147–159
- (Les) Archives théâtrales, December 1887, p. 346
- Arthur, George, Sarah Bernhardt (originally published in 1923), Read Books, 2008. ISBN 1-4437-4068-3
- Baker, Evan, "Sardou and Sardoodledom, Puccini and Tosca", Programme Notes, San Francisco Opera, 2009. Retrieved 9 July 2010.
- Berkeley Daily Gazette, "Pauline Frederick in "La Tosca" Feature at the Strand Theater", 27 May 1918, p. 3. Retrieved 9 July 2010.
- Berton, Thérèse Meilhan and Woon, Basil, Sarah Bernhardt as I knew her, Hurst & Blackett, 1923
- Burton, Deborah, "The Real Scarpia: Historical Sources for Tosca", The Opera Quarterly, Vol. 10, No. 2, 1993 pp. 67–86
- Carner, Mosco, Giacomo Puccini, Tosca, Cambridge University Press, 1985. ISBN 0-521-29661-7
- Clapp, John B. and Edgett, Edwin F., Plays of the Present (originally published in 1902), Ayer Publishing, 1980. ISBN 0-405-08361-0
- Corriere della Sera, "La Tosca visionaria e disperata di Dalla arriva al Gran Teatro", 11 December 2009. Retrieved 9 July 2010.
- Crowther, Bosley, "Story of Tosca, Italian Film Dealing With Puccini Opera, Opens at Cinema Dante", New York Times, 19 December 1947. Retrieved 9 July 2010.
- Durgnat, Raymond Jean Renoir, University of California Press, 1974. ISBN 0-520-02283-1
- Favre, Jules, "Causerie Théâtrale", Les Annales politiques et littéraires 4 December 1887
- Fisher, Burton, Puccini's Tosca, Opera Journeys Publishing, 2005. ISBN 0-9771320-4-8
- (Il) Giornale, "Tosca amore disperato Stasera su Raiuno", 3 June 2010. Retrieved 9 July 2010.
- Girardi, Michele (ed.), Tosca 1800 1900 2000, Catalogue of the exhibition held at the Museo Nazionale di Villa Guinigi, Lucca, 2–27 February 2000. Retrieved 9 July 2010.
- Hall, Arthur D., La Tosca: A novel, Rand, McNally & Company, 1888
- Hart, Jerome Alfred, Sardou and the Sardou Plays, J.B.Lippincott, 1913
- Horne, Alistair, Seven Ages of Paris, Pan Macmillan, 2003. ISBN 0-330-48864-3
- Horowitz, Jason, "Roll Over, Puccini: 'Tosca' Has Been Pumped Up and Plugged In", New York Times, 31 May 2004. Retrieved 9 July 2010.
- Howard, Cecil, "La Tosca", The Theatre, Vol. XIL, July–December 1888, pp. 97–98
- Howard, Cecil, Dramatic Notes: A Yearbook of the Stage, Hutchinson & Co., 1891
- James, Kenneth, Escoffier: The King of Chefs, Continuum International Publishing Group, 2006. ISBN 1-85285-526-6
- Joannis, Claudette, Sarah Bernhardt: Reine de l'attitude et princesse des gestes, Payot, 2000. ISBN 2-228-89357-9
- Jones, Jan, Renegades, Showmen & Angels: A Theatrical History of Fort Worth from 1873–2001, TCU Press, 2006. ISBN 0-87565-318-9
- Lemaître, Jules, "Théâtre de la Porte Saint-Martin: La Tosca, drame en cinq actes de M. Victorien Sardou", 28 November 1887, collected in Jules Lemaître, Impressions de théâtre (2e série), Société française d'imprimerie
- Mason, Stuart, Bibliography of Oscar Wilde (originally published in 1906), Read Books, 2008. ISBN 1-4437-2845-4
- Mastrangelo, Matilde, "The Meijin Kurabe of Sanyutei Encho: An Original Approach to Western Drama in Japan", The Japan Foundation Newsletter, XXIX/No. 2, January 2002, pp. 14–16. Retrieved 9 July 2010.
- Montreal Gazette, "French Company Give Sardou Play", 28 February 1941, p. 3. Retrieved 9 July 2010.
- New York Times, "Modjeska in a New Play", 13 February 1884, p. 4. Retrieved 9 July 2010.
- New York Times, "Reflections on Sardou's Honesty as an Author", 18 September 1887, p. 1. Retrieved 9 July 2010.
- "Bernhardt as La Tosca Complete Success of Her Reappearance". The New York Times. 12 December 1887. p. 2.
- New York Times, "The New Theatre Opened", 4 March 1888, p. 5. Retrieved 9 July 2010.
- New York Times, "Miss Davenport Wins; Barrymore's claim to 'La Tosca' Decided Against Him", 28 April 1888, p. 8. Retrieved 9 July 2010.
- New York Times (5 June 1891). "La Tosca Makes a Record". The New York Times. p. 3.
- "La Tosca Has Two Cubs". The New York Times. 15 October 1894. p. 2.
- Nicassio, Susan Vandiver, Tosca's Rome: The Play and the Opera in Historical Perspective, University of Chicago Press, 1999. ISBN 0-226-57972-7
- Otago Witness, "Notes by Pasquin", Issue 1880, 2 December 1887, p. 28. Retrieved 9 July 2010.
- Otago Witness, "Notes by Pasquin", Issue 1885, 6 January 1888, p. 28. Retrieved 9 July 2010.
- Perusse, Lyle F., "Tosca and Piranesi", The Musical Times, Vol. 122, No. 1665, November 1981, pp. 743–745
- Phillips-Matz, Mary Jane, Puccini: A Biography, Northeastern University Press, 2002. ISBN 1-55553-530-5
- Punch, "Sarah La Tosca", Vol. XCIV, 21 July 1888, p. 28.
- Reading Eagle, "What the Ladies are Wearing for Fall and Winter", 11 November 1888
- Richards, Jeffrey, Sir Henry Irving: A Victorian Actor and His World, Continuum International Publishing Group, 2007. ISBN 1-85285-591-6
- Sardou, Victorien, La Tosca, drame en cinq actes, 1887, in annotated English translation by Deborah Burton, 2004: Act I Archived 17 July 2011 at the Wayback Machine, Act II, Act III, Act IV, Act V. Retrieved 9 July 2010.
- Savran, David, Highbrow/Lowdown: Theater, Jazz, and the Making of the New Middle Class, University of Michigan Press, 2009. ISBN 0-472-11692-4
- Schickling, Dieter, "Fictional Reality: Musical and Literary Imagery in the Toscas of Sardou and Puccini" in Deborah Burton, Susan Vandiver Nicassio, and Agostino Ziino (eds.), Tosca's Prism: Three Moments of Western Cultural History, Northeastern University Press, 2004. ISBN 1-55553-616-6
- Severa, Joan L., Dressed for the Photographer: Ordinary Americans and Fashion, 1840–1900, Kent State University Press, 1995. ISBN 0-87338-512-8
- Stape, John Henry and Simmons, Allan, "Tosca's Kiss: Sardou, Puccini, and The Secret Agent" in Stape and Simmons (eds.), Rodopi, 2007, pp. 106–116. ISBN 90-420-2176-4
- Walkley, Arthur Bingham, Play House Impressions (originally published in 1892), BiblioBazaar, LLC, 2009. ISBN 1-110-57343-X
- Wynn, David, Merely Players: The Scripts, iUniverse, 2003. ISBN 0-595-27371-8
