= Vissi d'arte =

Aria from Tosca by Giacomo Puccini

"Vissi d'arte"
Sung in 1914 by Emmy Destinn (3:11)

"Vissi d'arte" is a soprano aria from act 2 of the opera Tosca by Giacomo Puccini. It is sung by Floria Tosca as she thinks of her fate, how the life of her beloved, Mario Cavaradossi, is at the mercy of Baron Scarpia and why God has seemingly abandoned her. The vocal range is E♭_{4} to B♭_{5}.

== Libretto ==
Vissi d'arte, vissi d'amore,
non feci mai male ad anima viva!
Con man furtiva
quante miserie conobbi aiutai.

Sempre con fe' sincera
la mia preghiera
ai santi tabernacoli salì.
Sempre con fe' sincera
diedi fiori agli altar.

Nell'ora del dolore
perché, perché, Signore,
perché me ne rimuneri così?

Diedi gioielli della Madonna al manto,
e diedi il canto agli astri, al ciel,
che ne ridean più belli.
Nell'ora del dolore,
perché, perché, Signor,
ah, perché me ne rimuneri così?

I lived for art, I lived for love,
I never harmed a living soul!
With a discreet hand
I relieved all misfortunes I encountered.

Always with sincere faith
my prayer
rose to the holy tabernacles.
Always with sincere faith
I decorated the altars with flowers.

In this hour of grief,
why, why, Lord,
why do you reward me thus?

I donated jewels to the Madonna's mantle,
and offered songs to the stars and to heaven,
which thus did shine with more beauty.
In this hour of grief,
why, why, Lord,
ah, why do you reward me thus?

== See also ==
- Tosca
- E lucevan le stelle
- Giacomo Puccini
- Luigi Illica
