= Emmy Destinn =

Czech operatic soprano (1878–1930)

Emmy Destinn Ema Destinnová
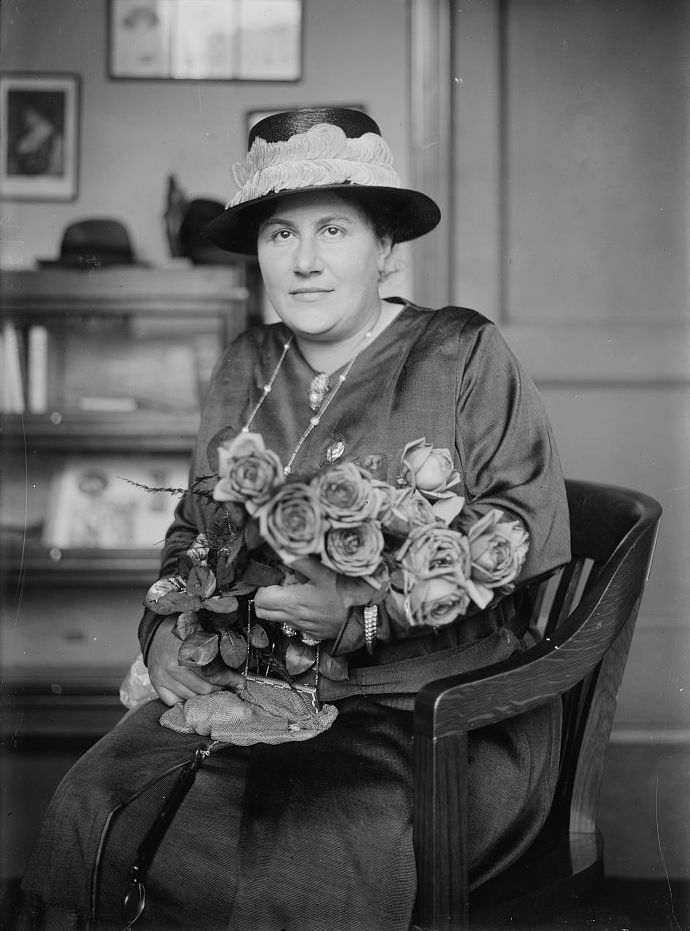
- Emmy Destinn in 1919

Background information
- Born: Emilie Pavlína Jindřiška Kittlová; 26 February 1878; Nové Město, Prague, Čechy, Austria-Hungary
- Died: 28 January 1930 (aged 51) České Budějovice, Czechoslovakia
- Genres: Opera
- Occupation: Singer
- Instrument: Vocals
- Years active: 1898–1926

Emmy Destinn (Czech: Ema Destinnová ([ˈɛma ˈdɛstɪnovaː]); 26 February 1878 – 28 January 1930) was a Czech operatic dramatic soprano. She had a career both in Europe and at the New York Metropolitan Opera. She was one of the greatest opera singers of the 19th and 20th centuries.

== Biography ==
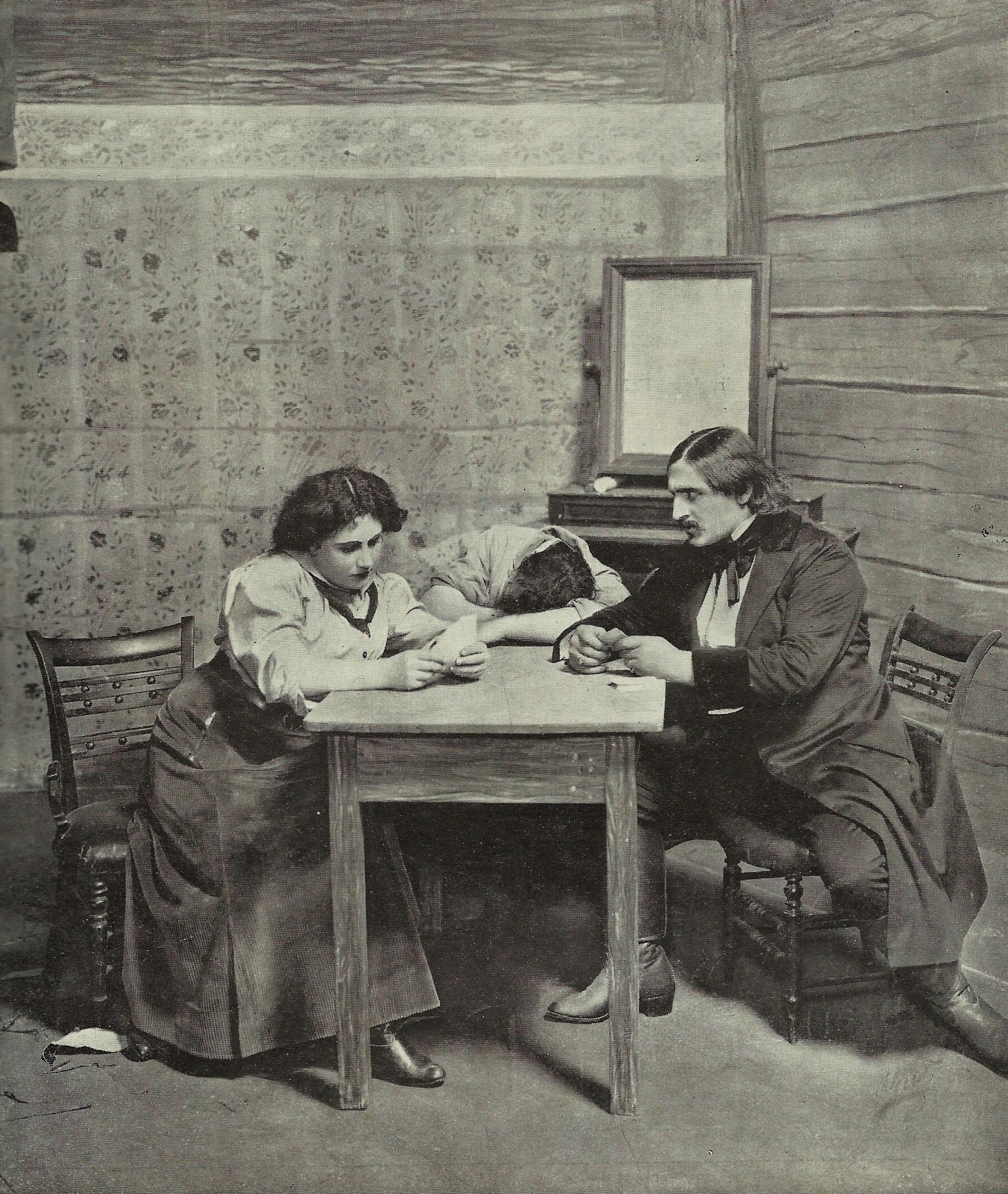
"Una partita a poker" – a crucial scene of Puccini's La fanciulla del West; Minnie – Emmy Destinn; Johnson – Enrico Caruso; Sheriff Jack Rance – Pasquale Amato

Destinn was born Emilie Pavlína Jindřiška Kittlová in Nové Město, Prague, Čechy, in what was then Austria-Hungary. She was baptized Catholic at Kostel svatého Štěpána. Her family soon left Prague and until the age of 14, Emmy grew up in Milešov, where her father owned mines. In 1892, she was sent to a German boarding school in Prague to learn German, playing the piano and the violin, but Anna Adamcová, a member of the National Theatre, advised her to improve her singing.

Her voice teacher since age 13 had been Marie von Dreger Loewe-Destinn, and the young singer began using her teacher's surname as a tribute. She was let go after the short engagement at the Dresden Opera and declined by Prague National Theatre in 1897. She debuted on 19 July 1898 at the Berlin Court Opera as Santuzza in Cavalleria rusticana. She made such progress that the intendant of the Berlin Court Opera engaged her at once when she was brought to intendant's notice. She was only nineteen at the time, but her voice and her acting soon won the Berlin public. Her engagement in Berlin lasted until 27 October 1909. She sang in 54 operas, including 12 premieres.

Her fame became international in 1901 when she was invited to sing the part of Senta in Der fliegende Holländer at Germany's Bayreuth Festspielhaus. She returned to sing the same role the next year.

Destinn made her London debut at Covent Garden's Royal Opera House on 2 May 1904, as Donna Anna in Don Giovanni. She appeared there in several operas for the next two seasons, including the London premiere of Madama Butterfly with Caruso. Her Metropolitan Opera debut came in 1908 with an acclaimed performance of Aida, after she was released from her contract with the Berlin Court Opera. Two years later at the Met, she created the role of Minnie in the premiere of Puccini's La fanciulla del West, again opposite Caruso, and under the direction of Arturo Toscanini.

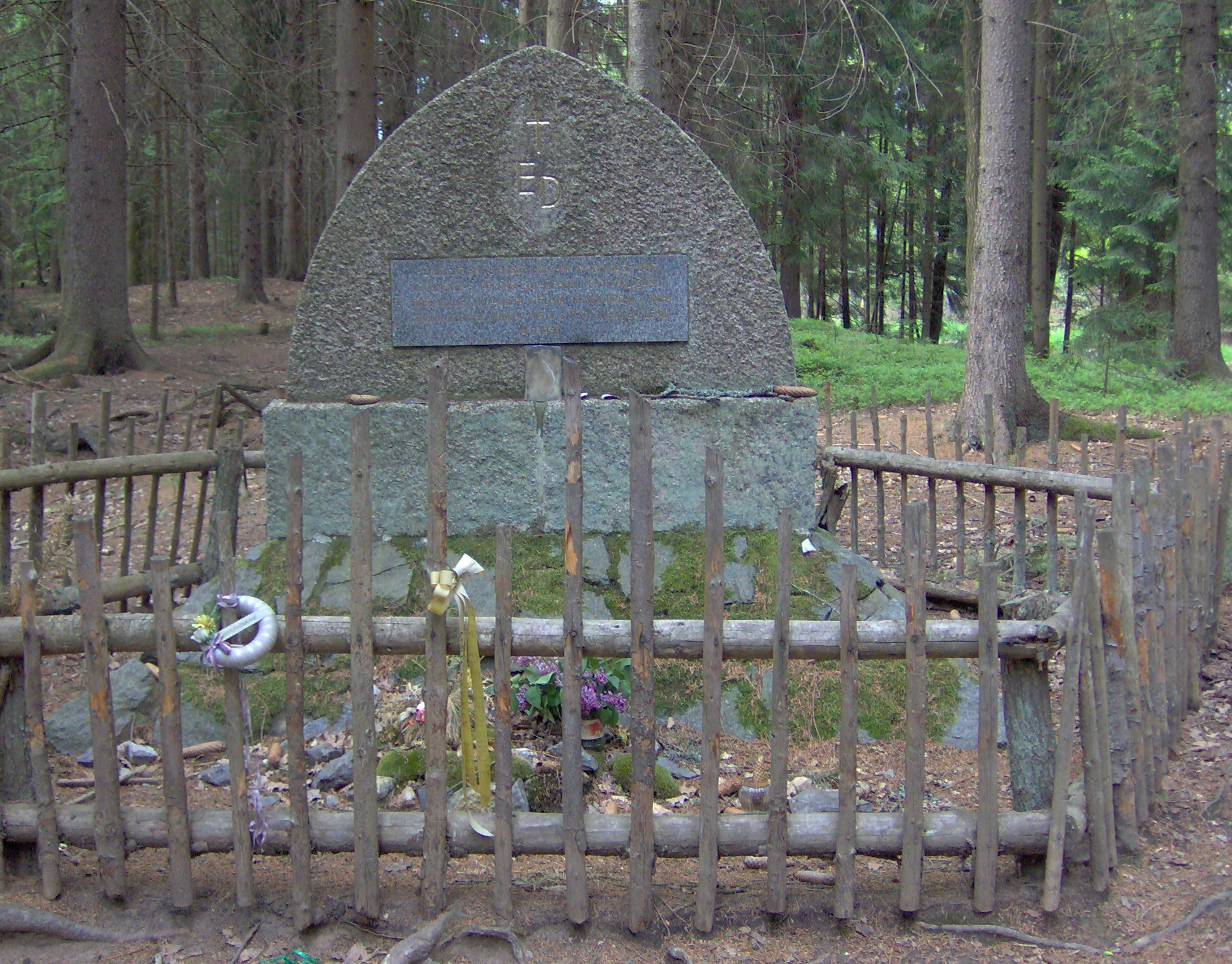
Memorial of Emmy Destinn near Třeboň

While she was highly successful in the lighter roles of Wagner's operas, her spinto voice—although large in size, with a ringing top register—was better suited to German music of a less declamatory type. She also excelled in the French part of Carmen, in which she was said to rival Calvé, and in the Italian roles of Aida, Madama Butterfly and Leonora (in Il trovatore).

Destinn's career suffered a fatal blow in World War I. She returned to her homeland after the start of the war in 1914, but her links with the patriotic Czech resistance caused her passport to be revoked. She was interned at her chateau for the remainder of the conflict. By the time that she returned to the Met in 1919, her voice had become rusty and she had been replaced in the hearts of New York audiences by a new generation of singers, although she did still continue to sing with the company until 1921.

== Last years and death ==
Destinn returned to Czechoslovakia, where in 1923, she married Joseph Halsbach, a Czech air-force officer. She retired from the stage in 1926.

Destinn died from a stroke aged 51, on 28 January 1930, in České Budějovice, Czechoslovakia. She was interred in the Vyšehrad cemetery in Prague.

== Legacy ==
"Song to the Moon" ("Měsíčku na nebi hlubokém")
From Antonín Dvořák's Rusalka; performed in 1915.

"Vissi d'arte"
"Vissi d'arte" from Giacomo Puccini's Tosca; recorded in 1914.

Her likeness appeared in 1996 on the 2,000 Czech koruna banknote. The main-belt asteroid 6583 Destinn is named after her.
