= Milešov =

- Municipality
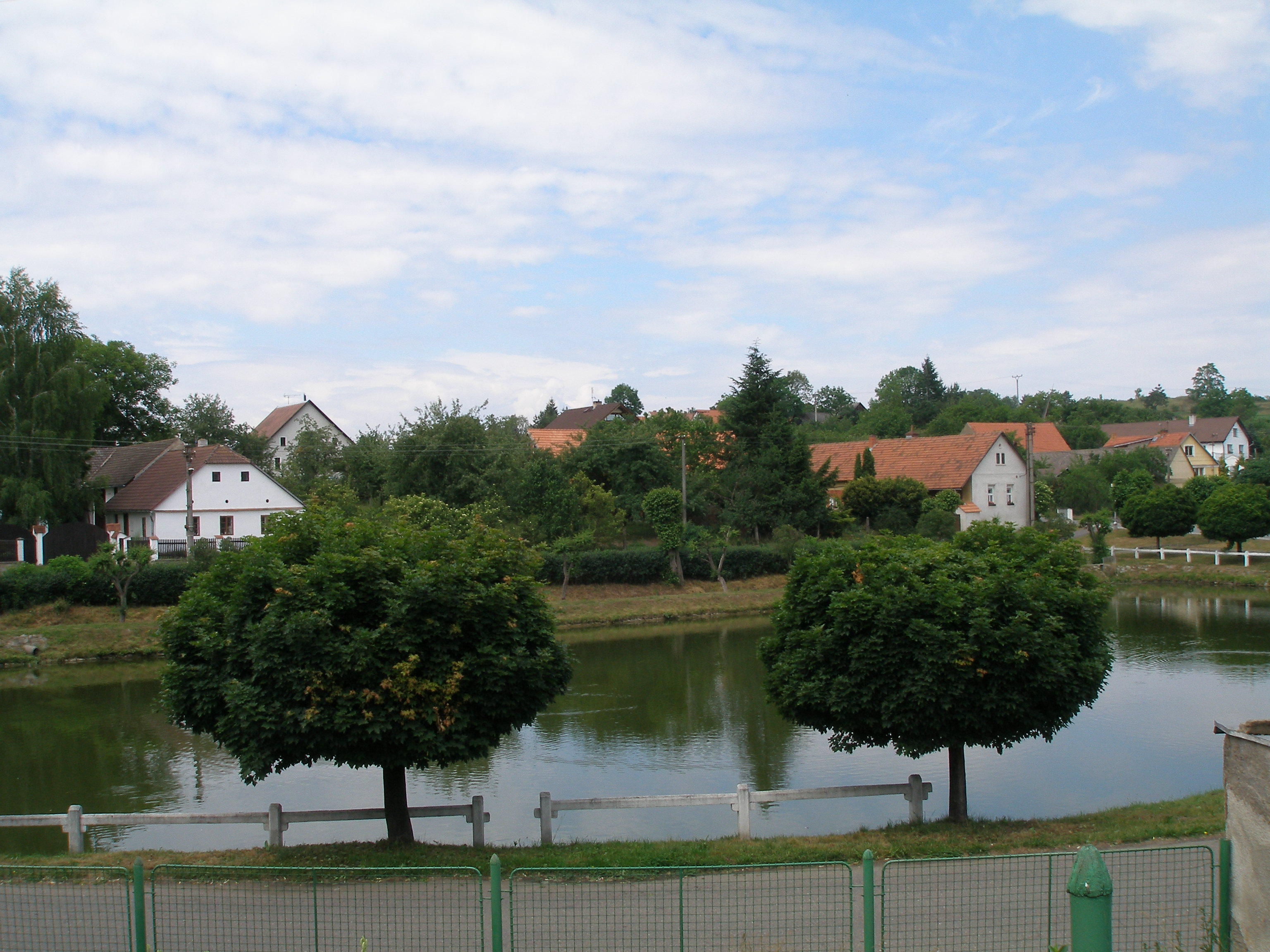
- Centre of Milešov

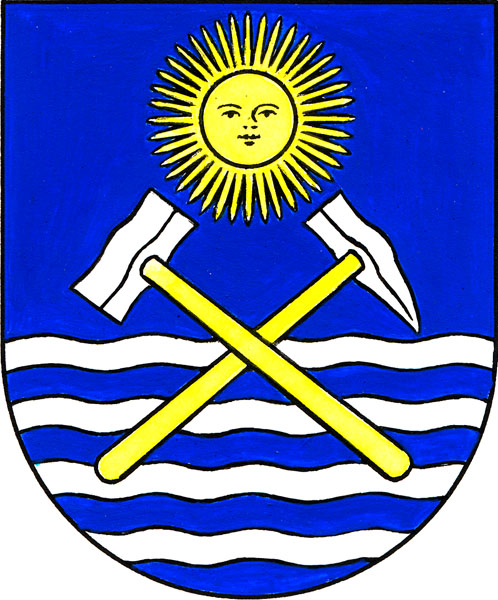
- Flag Coat of arms

- Location in the Czech Republic
- Coordinates: 49°35′22″N 14°13′17″E
- Country: Czech Republic
- Region: Central Bohemian
- District: Příbram
- First mentioned: 1323

Area
  - Total: 15.51 km^{2} (5.99 sq mi)
- Elevation: 401 m (1,316 ft)

Population (2026-01-01)
  - Total: 325
  - Density: 21.0/km^{2} (54.3/sq mi)
- Time zone: UTC+1 (CET)
  - Summer (DST): UTC+2 (CEST)
- Postal code: 262 34
- Website: milesov.cz

Milešov is a municipality and village in Příbram District in the Central Bohemian Region of the Czech Republic. It has about 300 inhabitants.

== Administrative division ==
Milešov consists of three municipal parts (in brackets population according to the 2021 census):

- Milešov (209)
- Klenovice (91)
- Přední Chlum (22)

== Etymology ==
The name Milešov is derived from the personal name Mileš, meaning "Mileš's (court)".

== Geography ==
Milešov is located about 19 kilometres (12 mi) southeast of Příbram and 50 km (31 mi) south of Prague. It lies in the Benešov Uplands. The highest point is the hill Bukovec at 554 m (1,818 ft) above sea level. The western and northern municipal border is formed by the Vltava River, respectively by the Orlík and Kamýk reservoirs, built on the Vltava.

== History ==
The first written mention of Milešov is from 1323. The village was founded in the 14th century as a result of gold and antimony mining in the area.

== Demographics ==
Historical population

Year	Pop.	±%
1869	1,301	—
1880	1,322	+1.6%
1890	1,323	+0.1%
1900	1,403	+6.0%
1910	1,283	−8.6%

Year	Pop.	±%
1921	1,220	−4.9%
1930	1,146	−6.1%
1950	751	−34.5%
1961	551	−26.6%
1970	445	−19.2%

Year	Pop.	±%
1980	409	−8.1%
1991	343	−16.1%
2001	317	−7.6%
2011	358	+12.9%
2021	322	−10.1%

Source: Censuses

== Transport ==
There are no railways or major roads passing through the municipality.

== Sights ==
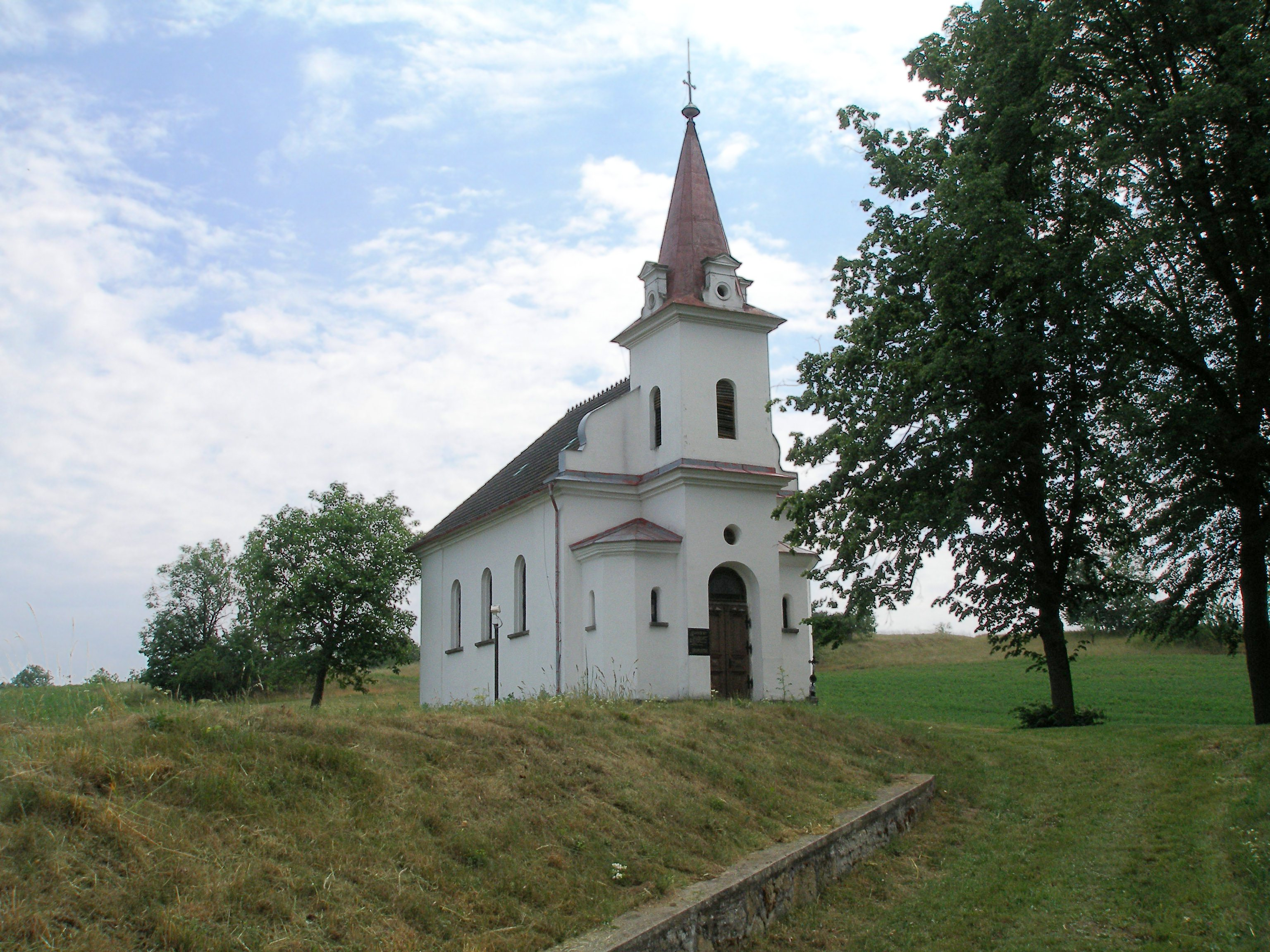
Church of the Assumption of the Virgin Mary

The main historical landmark of Milešov is the Church of the Assumption of the Virgin Mary. It was built in the neo-Gothic style in 1903–1905.

Destinov Mansion was built in the mid-19th century for Emanuel Kittl, who owned local mines and is known as the father of Emmy Destinn. The romantic mansion was rebuilt for recreational purposes in the 20th century.

== Notable people ==
- Emmy Destinn (1878–1930), operatic soprano; grew up here
