= Recondita armonia =

First romanza in the opera Tosca (1900) by Giacomo Puccini

"Recondita armonia"
Enrico Caruso's 1907 performance (2:25)

"Recondita armonia" is the first romanza in the opera Tosca (1900) by Giacomo Puccini. It is sung by the painter Mario Cavaradossi when comparing his love, Tosca, to a portrait of Mary Magdalene that he is painting.

== Libretto ==
Recondita armonia di bellezze diverse!
È bruna Floria, l'ardente amante mia.
E te, beltade ignota, cinta di chiome bionde,
Tu azzurro hai l'occhio,
Tosca ha l'occhio nero!

L'arte nel suo mistero,
le diverse bellezze insiem confonde...
Ma nel ritrar costei,
Il mio solo pensiero,
Ah! Il mio sol pensier sei tu,
Tosca, sei tu!

Concealed harmony of contrasting beauties!
Floria, my ardent lover, is dark haired.
And you, unknown beauty, crowned with blond hair,
You have blue eyes,
Tosca has black eyes!

Art, in its mysterious way,
blends the contrasting beauties together...
But while I'm painting her,
My only thought,
My only thought is of you,
Tosca, it is of you!
