= Deborah Burton =

American music theorist

Deborah Burton is an American music theorist, pianist, and academic. She is particularly known for her publications on Giacomo Puccini and his works, including Recondite Harmony (Pendragon, 2012) and the 2004 book Tosca's Prism: Three Moments of Western Cultural History. She has contributed articles to numerous music journals, including Nuova Rivista Musicale, Opera Quarterly, Studi Musicali, and Theoria.

== Life and career ==
Burton earned a diploma in piano performance from the Mannes College of Music, a Master of Music from the Yale School of Music, and a PhD from the University of Michigan in 1995 with a doctoral dissertation entitled An Analysis of Puccini's Tosca: A Heuristic Approach to the Unifying Elements of the Opera. She is associate professor of music, composition and theory at Boston University and is a former faculty member at Adrian College, Florida International University, Fordham University, Harvard University and the University of Massachusetts Amherst.

Burton was one of the originators of the conference Tosca 2000 in Rome, marking the centenary of Puccini's Tosca and the 2010 Boston conference Fanciulla 100: Celebrating Puccini, marking the centenary of Puccini's La fanciulla del West.

== Bibliography ==
Books

- Burton, Deborah (2026), The Finales of “Turandot”: Puccini’s Last Act. Routledge.
- Burton, Deborah (2012). Recondite Harmony: Essays on Puccini's Operas. Pendragon Press.
- Burton, Deborah and Gregory Harwood (2012). The Theoretical-Practical Elements of Music, Parts III and IV, Studies in the History of Music Theory and Literature, vol. 5. University of Illinois Press.
- Burton, Deborah; Nicassio, Susan Vandiver; Ziino, Agostino (eds.) (2004). Tosca's Prism: Three Moments of Western Cultural History. Northeastern University Press. ISBN 1-55553-616-6

Articles

- Burton, Deborah. (1994). "A Select Bibliography of Articles and Dissertations about Puccini and His Operas" in The Puccini Companion, William Weaver and Simonetta Puccini (eds). Norton. ISBN 0-393-32052-9
- Burton, Deborah (1994). "The Real Scarpia: Historical Sources for Tosca." Opera Quarterly, Vol. 10, no. 2
- Burton, Deborah (1996). "The Creation of Tosca: Toward a Clearer View." Opera Quarterly, Vol. 12, no. 3
- Burton, Deborah (1996). "Michele Puccini's Counterpoint Treatise". Quaderni pucciniani
- Burton, Deborah (2001). "A Journey of Discovery: Puccini's 'motivo di prima intenzione' and its applications in Manon Lescaut, La fanciulla del West and Suor Angelica". Studi Musicali, 2, pp. 473–499
- Burton, Deborah (2004). "Orfeo, Osmin and Otello: Towards a theory of opera analysis", Studi musicali Vol. 33, no. 2

== Sources ==
- Ellison, Cori (December 3, 2010). "When Puccini Rode Tall In the Saddle". The New York Times
- Fairtile, Linda (1999). Giacomo Puccini: A guide to research. Routledge. ISBN 0-8153-2033-7
- Kellow, Brian (December 2010). "Giordani saddles up to sing Dick Johnson at the Met; a Boston University academic makes Fanciulla's centennial her personal crusade.". Opera News, Vol. 75, No. 6
- Sachs, Julian (December 10, 2010) "Puccini's 100-Year-Old Girl". i-Italy, Italian/American Digital Project
- Weaver, William (July 16, 2000). "In 'Tosca,' a Touch of Family History". The New York Times, p. 21, Section 2
