= E lucevan le stelle =

Aria from Puccini's 1900 opera Tosca

"E lucevan le stelle" ("And the stars were shining") is a romantic aria from the third act of Giacomo Puccini's opera Tosca from 1900, composed to an Italian libretto by Luigi Illica and Giuseppe Giacosa. It is sung in act 3 by Mario Cavaradossi (tenor), a painter in love with the singer Tosca, while he waits for his execution on the roof of Castel Sant'Angelo.

Written in B minor, it is one of the most famous opera arias. The vocal range extends from F♯_{3} to A_{4}. The aria is considered part of the spinto tenor repertoire.

The aria is introduced by a somber clarinet solo. The incipit of the melody (heard in outline earlier in the act, as the sky lightens and the gaoler prepares for the execution) is repeated on the lines "O dolci baci, o languide carezze" ("Oh, sweet kisses and languorous caresses"), and also restated in forte in the closing bars of the opera, as Tosca jumps from the ramparts.

"E lucevan le stelle"
Sung by Leo Slezak, 1913, recorded on Edison cylinder

== Libretto ==
Italian

E lucevan le stelle ...
ed olezzava la terra
stridea l'uscio dell'orto ...
e un passo sfiorava la rena ...
Entrava ella fragrante,
mi cadea fra le braccia.

O! dolci baci, o languide carezze,
mentr'io fremente le belle forme disciogliea dai veli!
Svanì per sempre il sogno mio d'amore.
L'ora è fuggita, e muoio disperato!
E muoio disperato!
E non ho amato mai tanto la vita,
tanto la vita!

Literal translation

And the stars were shining,
And the earth was scented.
The gate of the garden creaked
And a footstep grazed the sand...
Fragrant, she entered
And fell into my arms.

Oh, sweet kisses and languorous caresses,
While trembling I stripped the beautiful form of its veils!
Forever, my dream of love has vanished.
That moment has fled, and I die in desperation.
And I die in desperation!
And I never before loved life so much,
Loved life so much!

Free translation

When the stars were brightly shining ...
And faint perfumes the air pervaded,
Creaked the gate of the garden ...
And footstep its precincts invaded ...
'Twas hers, the fragrant creature.
In her soft arms she clasped me...

With sweetest kisses, tenderest caresses,
A thing of beauty, of matchless symmetry in form and feature!
My dream of love is now dispelled forever.
I lived uncaring and now I die despairing!
Alas I die despairing!
And never was life so dear to me, no never,
So dear, no never!

== Plagiarism suit ==
In 1920, the stage performer Al Jolson, together with Buddy DeSylva and Vincent Rose, wrote a popular song, "Avalon", about the town of the same name on Santa Catalina island. The following year, G. Ricordi, the publisher of Puccini's operas, sued all parties associated with the song, arguing that the melody was lifted from "E lucevan le stelle". Puccini and his publisher prevailed in the case and were awarded $25,000 in damages and all future royalties for the song.
