= Anna Netrebko discography =

Russian-Austrian soprano Anna Netrebko has released several solo recital albums and was featured in opera recordings, both on audio and on film. She recorded primarily with Deutsche Grammophon, to which she signed exclusively in 2003. Some of her filmed Metropolitan Opera performances are available on Met Opera on Demand.

== Complete operas ==
=== Video ===
Recording year	Opera & Role	Other cast	Conductor Chorus and orchestra	Release year	Label
1995	Glinka; Ruslan and Lyudmila (as Lyudmila)	Vladimir Ognovenko; Larissa Diadkova; Gennady Bezzubenkov; Galina Gorchakova	Valery Gergiev; Kirov Opera orchestra, chorus and ballet	2003	Philips
1998	Prokofiev; Betrothal in a Monastery (as Louisa)	Larissa Diadkova; Nikolai Gassiev; Aleksander Gergalov; Sergei Aleksashkin	Valery Gergiev; Kirov Opera orchestra, chorus and ballet	2005	Philips
2005	Verdi; La traviata (as Violetta Valéry)	Rolando Villazón; Thomas Hampson; Helene Schneiderman; Diane Pilcher	Carlo Rizzi; Vienna Philharmonic, Vienna State Opera chorus and Mozarteum Orchestra Salzburg (stage music)	2006	Deutsche Grammophon
2005	Donizetti; L'elisir d'amore (as Adina)	Rolando Villazón; Ildebrando D'Arcangelo; Leo Nucci; Inna Los	Alfred Eschwé; Vienna State Opera orchestra, chorus and stage orchestra	2007	Virgin Classics
2006	Mozart; Le nozze di Figaro (as Susanna)	Ildebrando D'Arcangelo; Bo Skovhus; Dorothea Röschmann; Christine Schäfer	Nikolaus Harnoncourt; Vienna Philharmonic and Vienna State Opera chorus	2007	Deutsche Grammophon
2007	Bellini; I puritani (as Elvira)	Eduardo Valdes; Franco Vasallo; John Relyea; Eric Cutler	Patrick Summers; Metropolitan Opera orchestra, chorus and ballet	2008	Deutsche Grammophon
2007	Massenet; Manon (as Manon Lescaut)	Rolando Villazón; Christof Fischesser; Alfredo Daza; Rémy Coraza	Daniel Barenboim; Staatskapelle Berlin and Berlin State Opera chorus	2008	Deutsche Grammophon
2008	Puccini; La bohème (as Mimì)	Rolando Villazón; George von Bergen; Nicole Cabell; Adrian Eröd	Bertrand de Billy; Bavarian Radio Symphony Orchestra and chorus Staatstheater am Gärtnerplatz children chorus	2009	Axiom Films
2009	Donizetti; Lucia di Lammermoor (as Lucia)	Mariusz Kwiecień; Piotr Beczała; Colin Lee; Ildar Abdrazakov	Marco Armiliato; Metropolitan Opera orchestra, chorus and ballet	2009	Deutsche Grammophon
2010	Donizetti; Don Pasquale (as Norina)	Mariusz Kwiecień; Matthew Polenzani; John del Carlo; Bernard Fitch	James Levine; Metropolitan Opera orchestra and chorus	2011	Deutsche Grammophon
2011	Donizetti; Anna Bolena (as Anna Bolena)	Elīna Garanča; Ildebrando D'Arcangelo; Elisabeth Kulman; Francesco Meli	Evelino Pidò; Vienna State Opera orchestra and chorus	2011	Deutsche Grammophon
2011	Mozart; Don Giovanni (as Donna Anna)	Peter Mattei; Bryn Terfel; Barbara Frittoli; Giuseppe Filianoti	Daniel Barenboim; Coro e Orchestra del Teatro alla Scala	2015	Deutsche Grammophon
2012	Puccini; La bohème (as Mimì)	Piotr Beczała; Massimo Cavalletti; Nino Machaidze; Alessio Arduini	Daniele Gatti; Vienna Philharmonic and Vienna State Opera chorus	2012	Deutsche Grammophon
2012	Massenet; Manon (as Manon)	Piotr Beczała; Paulo Szot; David Pittsinger	Fabio Luisi; Metropolitan Opera		Met Opera on Demand
2012	Donizetti; L'elisir d'amore (as Adina)	Matthew Polenzani; Mariusz Kwiecień; John Del Carlo	Maurizio Benini; Metropolitan Opera orchestra and chorus		Met Opera on Demand
2013	Tchaikovsky; Eugene Onegin (as Tatyana)	Elena Zaremba; Oksana Volkova; Piotr Beczała; Mariusz Kwiecień	Valery Gergiev; Metropolitan Opera orchestra, chorus and ballet	2014	Deutsche Grammophon
2013	Verdi; Il trovatore (as Leonora)	Plácido Domingo; Gaston Rivero; Marina Prudenskaya	Daniel Barenboim; Staatskapelle Berlin	2014	Deutsche Grammophon
2013	Mozart; Don Giovanni (as Donna Anna)	Erwin Schrott; Luca Pisaroni; Malena Ernman; Charles Castronovo	Thomas Hengelbrock; Balthasar-Neumann Ensemble, Balthasar-Neumann Choir	2015	Sony Classical
2014	Verdi; Macbeth (as Lady Macbeth)	Zeljko Lucic; René Pape; Joseph Calleja	Fabio Luisi; Metropolitan Opera orchestra and chorus	2015	Deutsche Grammophon
2015	Tchaikovsky; Iolanta (as Iolanta)	Ilya Bannik; Piotr Beczała; Alexei Markov	Valery Gergiev; Metropolitan Opera orchestra and chorus		Met Opera on Demand
2015	Verdi; Il trovatore (as Leonora)	Yonghoon Lee; Dmitri Hvorostovsky; Dolora Zajick	Marco Armiliato; Metropolitan Opera orchestra and chorus		Met Opera on Demand
2015	Verdi; Giovanna d'Arco (as Giovanna)	Francesco Meli; Carlos Álvarez; Dmitry Belosselskiy	Riccardo Chailly; La Scala orchestra and chorus	2018	Decca
2016	Wagner; Lohengrin (as Elsa von Brabant)	Piotr Beczała; Evelyn Herlitzius; Tomasz Konieczny; Georg Zeppenfeld	Christian Thielemann; Staatskapelle Dresden; Sächsischer Staatsopernchor Dresden	2017	Deutsche Grammophon
2017	Tchaikovsky; Eugene Onegin (as Tatiana)	Peter Mattei; Elena Zaremba; Alexey Dolgov; Elena Maximova	Robin Ticciati; Metropolitan Opera orchestra and chorus		Met Opera on Demand
2018	Verdi; Aida (as Aida)	Anita Rachvelishvili; Aleksandrs Antonenko; Quinn Kelsey	Nicola Luisotti; Metropolitan Opera orchestra and chorus		Met Opera on Demand
2019	Cilea; Adriana Lecouvreur (as Adriana)	Anita Rachvelishvili; Piotr Beczała; Ambrogio Maestri	Gianandrea Noseda; Metropolitan Opera orchestra and chorus		Met Opera on Demand

=== Audio ===
Recording year	Opera & role	Other cast	Conductor, Chorus and orchestra	Release year	Label
1995	Glinka; Ruslan and Lyudmila (as Lyudmila)	Vladimir Ognovenko; Larissa Diadkova; Gennady Bezzubenkov; Galina Gorchakova	Valery Gergiev; Kirov Opera orchestra, chorus and ballet	2003	Philips
1997	Prokofiev; The Love for Three Oranges (as Ninetta)	Larissa Diadkova; Mikhail Kit; Evgeny Akimov; Alexander Morozov	Valery Gergiev; Kirov Opera orchestra, chorus and ballet	2001	Philips
1998	Prokofiev; Betrothal in a Monastery (as Louisa)	Larissa Diadkova; Nikolai Gassiev; Aleksander Gergalov; Sergei Aleksashkin	Valery Gergiev; Kirov Opera orchestra, chorus and ballet	1999	Philips
2005	Verdi; La traviata (as Violetta)	Rolando Villazón; Thomas Hampson; Helene Schneiderman; Diane Pilcher	Carlo Rizzi; Vienna Philharmonic, Vienna State Opera chorus and Mozarteum Orchestra Salzburg (stage music)	2006	Deutsche Grammophon
2006	Mozart; Le nozze di Figaro (as Susanna)	Ildebrando D'Arcangelo; Bo Skovhus; Dorothea Röschmann; Christine Schäfer	Nikolaus Harnoncourt; Vienna Philharmonic and Vienna State Opera chorus	2007	Deutsche Grammophon
2007	Puccini; La bohème (as Mimì)	Rolando Villazón; Boaz Daniel; Nicole Cabell; Stéphane Degout	Bertrand de Billy; Bavarian Radio Symphony Orchestra and chorus Staatstheater am Gärtnerplatz children chorus	2008	Deutsche Grammophon
2008	Bellini; I Capuleti e i Montecchi (as Giulietta)	Elīna Garanča; Joseph Calleja; Robert Gleadow; Tiziano Bracci	Fabio Luisi; Vienna Symphony and the Wiener Singakademie	2009	Deutsche Grammophon
2012	Tchaikovsky; Iolanta (as Iolanta)	Sergey Skorokhodov; Alexey Markov; Vitalij Kowaljow	Emmanuel Villaume; Slovenian Philharmonic Orchestra	2015	Deutsche Grammophon
2013	Verdi; Giovanna d'Arco (as Giovanna)	Plácido Domingo; Francesco Meli	Paolo Carignani; Münchner Rundfunkorchester	2014	Deutsche Grammophon
2016	Puccini; Manon Lescaut (as Manon)	Yusif Eyvazov; Armando Piña; Carlos Chausson	Marco Armiliato; Münchner Rundfunkorchester	2016	Deutsche Grammophon

== Recitals ==
- Opera Arias (2003). Gianandrea Noseda, Wiener Philharmoniker (DG)
- Sempre Libera (2004). Claudio Abbado, Mahler Chamber Orchestra (DG)
- Violetta: Arias and Duets from Verdi's La Traviata (2006). Rolando Villazón, Thomas Hampson (CD/DVD, DG)
- Russian Album (2006). Valery Gergiev, Orchestra of Mariinsky Theatre (DG)
- Duets, with Rolando Villazón (2007). Nicola Luisotti, Staatskapelle Dresden (DG)
- Souvenirs (2008). Emmanuel Villaume, Prague Philharmonia (DG)
- In the Still of Night (2010). accompanied by Daniel Barenboim (DG)
- Anna Netrebko: Live at the Metropolitan Opera (2011). (DG)
- Verdi (2013). Gianandrea Noseda, Orchestra del Teatro Regio di Torino (DG)
- Strauss: Four Last Songs (2014). Daniel Barenboim, Staatskapelle Berlin (DG)
- Verismo, with Yusif Eyvazov (2016). Orchestra dell'Accademia Nazionale di Santa Cecilia, Antonio Pappano (DG)
- Romanza, with Yusif Eyvazov (2017). (DG)

== Concert works ==
- Rossini: Stabat Mater (2010). Joyce DiDonato, Lawrence Brownlee, Ildebrando d'Arcangelo. Antonio Pappano, Orchestra and Chorus of Accademia Nazionale di Santa Cecilia (Warner Classics)
- Stabat Mater – A Tribute to Pergolesi (2011). Marianna Pizzolato. Antonio Pappano, Orchestra dell'Accademia Nazionale di Santa Cecilia (CD/DVD, DG)

== Compilations ==
- The Mozart Album (2006). Thomas Quasthoff, Bryn Terfel, Elīna Garanča, René Pape [compilation, DG]
- Opera (2007). [compilation]
- Puccini Gold (2008). [compilation, Decca]
- The Best of Anna Netrebko (2009). [compilation, DG]
- Prima Donna – First Ladies of Opera (2010). [compilation, Decca]
- Diva – The Very Best of Anna Netrebko (2018). [compilation, DG]

== Live concerts ==
- 2005: Gala Concert: 300 years of St. Petersburg
- 2006: The Berlin Concert – Live from the Waldbühne (with Rolando Villazón and Plácido Domingo)
- 2008: The Opera Gala – Live from Baden-Baden (with Elīna Garanča, Ramón Vargas, Ludovic Tézier)
- 2008: A Mozart Gala from Salzburg (with Thomas Hampson, et al.; recorded 2006)
- 2013: Live from Red Square Moscow (with Dmitri Hvorostovsky)

== Feature credits ==
- Philipp Kirkorov — "La voix" / "Голос" (2010)
