= Marcelo Álvarez =

Argentine lyric tenor (born 1962)

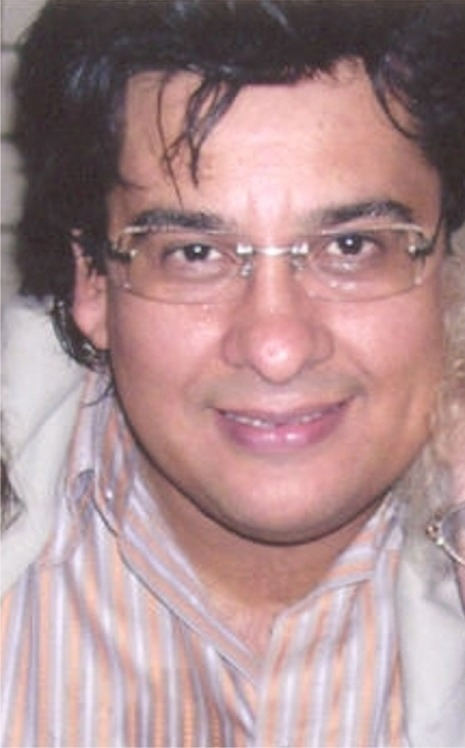
Álvarez backstage at the Met, September 2005

Marcelo Raúl Álvarez (born February 27, 1962) is an Argentine lyric tenor who achieved international success starting in the mid-1990s.

Álvarez travels widely, performing with top singers in major opera houses and concert halls around the world. Since the beginning of his career in 1994, he has maintained an active touring schedule and debuted in 34 roles. In addition to his opera and solo recordings, he has made an album honoring the popular songs of Argentine tango legend Carlos Gardel, as well as an album of classical duets with Salvatore Licitra. He has won notable awards for vocal performance and is considered one of the top tenors of his generation, receiving high acclaim for his passionate yet refined delivery in bel canto roles, French opera, and as of 2006, more dramatic lirico pieno (full lyric) and spinto roles.

He lives with his wife and son near Milan, Italy.

== Early years ==
Álvarez was born in Córdoba, Argentina. As a boy of five, he was enrolled in La Escuela de Niños Cantores de Córdoba where he studied music until age 17 and received his diploma in music education. In spite of this musical background, he went on to study economics at university, and for 12 years the study of music was completely out of his life. After his university studies, he became a manager of his family's furniture factory in Córdoba.

== Repertoire ==
=== Early career ===
Álvarez always liked singing and often imitated popular singers’ voices for the enjoyment of his friends, even winning them free drinks in pubs. He was 30 years old when his wife suggested that he sing opera. At the time, he did not know much about opera at all, but in 1992 he started commuting to Buenos Aires for voice lessons with Norma Risso. It was a 12-hour trip by bus, but he was determined. Ms. Risso was so impressed with her student that she told him that within five years he would be singing all over the world, a prediction that proved accurate.

He had several unsuccessful auditions at the Teatro Colón in Buenos Aires. By fortunate coincidence, the legendary tenor Giuseppe di Stefano heard him at one of those auditions and urged him to go to Italy. "You have good instincts; you remind me of myself when I was a young man", di Stefano told him. Turning to the other people present, di Stefano commented, "this young man sings with his heart, he will have a great career!"

During this time, Álvarez had some performances in small houses in Argentina. His first stage role was as a late-replacement Count Almaviva in Rossini's Il barbiere di Siviglia in Córdoba in June 1994. He then performed in Federico Moreno Torroba's zarzuela Luisa Fernanda with Ismael Pons at the Teatro Avenida in Buenos Aires, a venue that features mostly that uniquely Spanish form of musical theater. Ismael Pons invited him to perform another zarzuela, Marina (zarzuela), in Menorca, Spain the next year and recommended him to Spanish baritone Juan Pons

In the 1980s and ‘90s, world-famous Italian tenor Luciano Pavarotti held worldwide talent auditions in his Pavarotti International Voice Competition. When he came to Buenos Aires and heard Álvarez audition in 1994, he immediately invited him to Philadelphia for the finals of the competition the following year.

While still in Argentina, Álvarez starred in Donizetti's L'elisir d'amore at the Teatro Roma in Buenos Aires (December 1994). These early performances enabled him to cultivate his voice and acting skills, and with the confidence he gained from those beginning experiences and the enthusiastic encouragement from di Stefano and Pavarotti, he and his wife decided to sell everything they owned and move to Europe to expand his opportunities for a career as an opera singer.

Álvarez came to Europe in 1995 and was quickly involved in a whirlwind of activity. He went to Spain and performed the zarzuela Marina and then moved to Milan in July. A mere seven days after his arrival in Italy, Álvarez won a voice competition in Pavia, and within a month he had landed contracts with the Teatro La Fenice in Venice and the Teatro Carlo Felice in Genoa. His La Fenice debut was in September of that year. The management gave him his choice of what he would like to perform for his role and house debut and he selected the challenging role of Elvino in Bellini's La sonnambula. Following this highly praised debut, he received offers from opera houses throughout Europe to perform six new roles, all of which he debuted in 1997. In addition, Italian mezzo-soprano Franca Mattiucci was his artistic advisor during this time.

=== Professional Career, 1995–1999 ===
As a result of his rising popularity and enthusiastic critical praise, Álvarez was engaged to appear at high-visibility venues throughout the world from the very start of his career. He debuted in a demanding number of new roles in Italian bel canto and French operas, completing ten role debuts during the first five years of his career and marking his rapid ascent onto the international scene. Alfredo in La traviata and The Duke in Rigoletto became his signature roles for this time period, with 150 performances of each of them.

In 1996 he was understudy for the role of Alfredo in Verdi's La traviata in Genoa. On opening night Álvarez was in the auditorium to watch the performance when he was told the tenor was ill and he had to go on immediately to replace him. This role debut paired him with the much-admired Italian soprano Mariella Devia. Within the next three years he sang his Alfredo in houses all around the world, from Hamburg to London, Tokyo, and Vienna. At the end of 1998, his house debut at the Metropolitan Opera House in New York was in a new Franco Zeffirelli production of La traviata, alongside American soprano Patricia Racette. He also performed La traviata with Ruth Ann Swenson at the Théâtre antique d'Orange in Orange, France and with Christina Gallardo-Domas at the Deutsche Oper Berlin in 1999.

He was a last minute replacement for Alfredo Kraus in the role of Arturo in Bellini's I puritani in Bologna, Italy, in February 1997. His big break came in the spring of 1997 in Genoa when he stepped in for Kraus again, this time in the lead role in Massenet's Werther. The entire Italian press covered this premiere and raved about the new tenor. He got the attention of Sony Classical and they signed him to an exclusive recording contract, producing six CDs in six years.

He sang his first performance as the Duke of Mantua in Verdi's Rigoletto in Trieste, Italy (role and house debut) in 1997. Multiple productions of Rigoletto followed over the next three years in Toulouse, Verona, Buenos Aires, Brussels (a June 1999 performance at the Théâtre Royal de la Monnaie that was televised live throughout Europe), New York, and Paris.

In 1997, London's Royal Opera House (sometimes referred to as Covent Garden, due to its location) was refurbished and performances were held at the Royal Albert Hall during construction. As a result, Álvarez made his London debut in a concert of Donizetti's Linda di Chamounix at the Royal Albert Hall in November of that year. His "debut proper" at the Royal Opera House of London was in September, 2000 in Offenbach's Les contes d'Hoffmann. Álvarez performs in London often and has remarked that the city holds a special place in his heart because, "that is the first place that audiences shouted out my name."

Álvarez traveled to Buenos Aires in the spring of 1999 for production of the award-winning documentary film, Marcelo Álvarez In Search of Gardel. The film chronicles the making of Álvarez's CD, Marcelo Álvarez Sings Gardel, which offers a modern audience the most famous tangos, while honoring the spirit and style of legendary tanguero Carlos Gardel. The songs on this album, originally recorded by Gardel before his early death in 1935, are among the oldest tangos and have a classical foundation, having been inspired by the music of Chopin, Brahms and Schumann.

=== 2000–2015 ===
The second decade of Álvarez's career saw continued upward momentum, both in the number of new roles added and in the types of projects in which he engaged. The majority of his professional recordings were made during this time and he continued in his demanding live performance schedule.

He debuted as Werther in Massenet's Werther in 1997, and then performed that role in a total of eight opera houses, including London, Vienna, and Munich, over the next nine years. Another role that he performed widely was Edgardo in Donizetti's Lucia di Lammermoor, appearing in ten opera houses in just six years. Major houses for this role included the Met, the Lyric Opera of Chicago, the Zurich Opera House, and the National Theatre Munich.

In January 2001, Álvarez sang his first American recital at the Folly Theater in Kansas City presented by the Harriman-Jewell Series which is noteworthy for introducing new singing talent to North America. Italian tenor Luciano Pavarotti made his professional recital debut on the Series in 1973, followed by other notable singers making their U.S. recital debuts over the years, including Mexican Francisco Araiza (1982), Canadian Ben Heppner (1997), Peruvian Juan Diego Flórez (2002), and Italian Salvatore Licitra(2005).

In the autumn of 2001, Álvarez portrayed the Duke in Scottish director David McVicar's new production of Rigoletto at the Royal Opera House in London with Italian baritone Paolo Gavanelli and German soprano Christine Schäfer. He performed in another McVicar production in 2009, this time in Verdi's Il trovatore at the Met with Sondra Radvanovsky, Dmitri Hvorostovsky and Dolora Zajick.

Álvarez made his house debut at Milan's Teatro alla Scala in a 1998 production of Linda di Chamounix with American soprano Laura Claycomb, who was also making her La Scala debut. In January 2002, he sang Alfredo in La traviata with Inva Mula in the inaugural performance of the new Teatro degli Arcimboldi in Milan, which was the temporary home for La Scala until 2004. He had additional performances at the Arcimboldi in 2002 and 2003 in role debuts of Donizetti's Lucrezia Borgia and Puccini's La bohème. That production of La bohème with Cristina Gallardo-Domas was by Franco Zeffirelli and had originally been created for Luciano Pavarotti.

In June 2003, Álvarez and Italian tenor Salvatore Licitra released Duetto, a collection of romantic ballads based on opera arias and other classical melodies, some of which were composed specifically for them to sing. They gave a concert of selections from Duetto at the Roman Colosseum, which was broadcast in the U.S. on PBS public television. Later that summer, Álvarez and Licitra went to New York and gave a concert-in-the-park of Duetto selections in New York's Central Park, to an audience of over 50,000 people.

Álvarez has performed with some of the world's most celebrated sopranos. In addition to those already mentioned, he performed opposite American soprano Renée Fleming in 2001 in Massenet's Manon at the L’Opéra de la Bastille in Paris and at the Met in 2005. In 2002, he sang in Lucie de Lammermoor with Italian soprano Patrizia Ciofi at the Théâtre du Châtelet in Paris, a French version that Donizetti created especially for Paris audiences. And in 2003, he performed with highly regarded Slovak soprano Edita Gruberova in Munich in Lucia di Lammermoor.

2006 marked the beginning of Álvarez's transition into a more dramatic lirico spinto repertoire and he has had some of his best success with it. He debuted in the role of Manrico in Verdi's Il trovatore in Parma, Italy, a venue that is notoriously critical of tenors. Álvarez happily reports that the audience took home their tomatoes intact, choosing not to throw them at him when he gave a performance that met their high standards. The following month he made his role debut as Cavaradossi in Puccini's Tosca at the Royal Opera House in London, performing with Romanian soprano Angela Gheorghiu and Welsh bass-baritone Bryn Terfel. He continued in the role of Cavaradossi at the Arena di Verona with Fiorenza Cedolins and bass-baritone Ruggero Raimondi in a new large-scale production by Argentine director Hugo de Ana.

2008 saw multiple productions of Bizet's Carmen as Álvarez brought his Don José to the Met with Russian mezzo-soprano Olga Borodina as Carmen; the Royal Opera House in London with Nancy Fabiola Herrera of Spain; with Russia's Julia Gertseva in Florence at the Maggio Musicale Fiorentino, and with France's Béatrice Uria-Monzon in Orange, France. His original debut as Rodolfo in Verdi's Luisa Miller was in London in 2003, with further performances over the next five years in Madrid, Parma and Valencia, Spain in 2008 with Greek soprano Alexia Voulgaridou.

Álvarez opened the 2009-2010 season of the Met as Cavaradossi in Puccini's Tosca, co-starring with soprano Karita Mattila and baritone George Gagnidze. It was a controversial new production by Swiss director Luc Bondy, replacing Franco Zeffirelli's lavish production that the Met had used for 24 years. The premiere performance was broadcast at no charge to over 3,000 people on a giant outdoor screen in Lincoln Center's Josie Robertson Plaza and on multiple screens in New York's Times Square for over 2,000 people. A later performance was broadcast in October as part of the Met's HD series, with distribution throughout the United States and 39 other countries.

In 2011, Álvarez appeared at the Met as Manrico in Il trovatore (also transmitted in HD). He debuted as Don Alvaro in La forza del destino in Paris in November of that year. Then in 2012 Álvarez performed his 10th role at the Met, Radames in Verdi's Aida, with Violeta Urmana.

October 11, 2015 marked Álvarez's first appearance on the West coast of the United States, between performances in Turandot at New York City's Metropolitan Opera House. He performed a solo concert near Los Angeles on the Broad Stage at the Santa Monica College Performing Arts Center. This performance was part of the Celebrity Opera Recitals program funded by the Lloyd E. Rigler – Lawrence E. Deutsch Foundation, known for generous gifts and support of classical music and opera, notably the creation of the Classic Art Showcase, which is available 24 hours a day on more than 500 channels in the United States, as well as online at ClassicArtsShowcase.org .

=== Metropolitan Opera Live in HD Performances ===
In August 2006, the Metropolitan Opera in New York City brought in its new general manager, Peter Gelb. He had a vision for expanding audiences for the opera via multiple platforms, including the bold concept of broadcasting live performances in high-definition video to theaters and venues throughout the world. The first transmission of these live Saturday matinée performances was a condensed English-language version of Mozart's The Magic Flute on December 30, 2006. These broadcasts are part of the Met's outreach to new audiences and have become increasingly successful each year, with almost 2,000 screens in over 60 countries broadcasting as of 2013.

Marcelo Álvarez has appeared in several HD Live performances, listed below:

Date of Broadcast	Opera	Composer	Role	Other Performers
October 10, 2009	Tosca	Puccini	Cavaradossi	Karita Mattila, George Gagnidze; Joseph Colaneri conductor
April 30, 2011	Il trovatore	Verdi	Manrico	Sondra Radvanovsky, Dolora Zajick, Dmitri Hvorostovsky; Marco Armilliato conductor
December 8, 2012	Un ballo in maschera	Verdi	Riccardo	Sondra Radvanovsky, Dmitri Hvorostovsky; Fabio Luisi conductor
April 25, 2015	Cavalleria rusticana and Pagliacci	Mascagni and Leoncavallo	Turiddu and Canio	Eva-Maria Westbroek Santuzza, Patricia Racette Nedda, and George Gagnidze also in dual roles as Alfio in Cavalleria and Tonio in Pagliacci; Fabio Luisi conductor

=== Complete Repertoire ===
Despite a relatively late start singing opera professionally at age 32, Álvarez has been committed to cultivating his career carefully, both in the types of roles he takes on and the progression of styles in which he engages. He puts a high priority on maintaining the principles of bel canto – a smooth vocal line, volume modulations, and vocal expression of emotions - all while preserving the tonal quality of the voice.

Year of Debut	#	Title	Composer	Role	Other Performers	Opera house	Location
1994	1	Il barbiere di Siviglia (The Barber of Seville)	Rossini	Count Almaviva	Omar Carrion, Oscar Grassi	Teatro del Libertador San Martin	Córdoba, Argentina
	2	Luisa Fernanda (zarzuela)	Federico Moreno Torroba	Javier	Cecilia Diaz, Ismael Pons	Teatro Avenida	Buenos Aires, Argentina
	3	L'elisir d'amore (The Elixir of Love)	Donizetti	Nemorino	Silvia Gatti, Omar Carrion, Pedro Alvarez	Teatro Roma	Buenos Aires
1995	4	Marina (zarzuela)	Emilio Arrieta	Jorge	Gail Dobish, Ismael Pons		Menorca, Spain
	5	La sonnambula (The Sleepwalker)	Bellini	Elvino	Giusy Devinu, Patrizia Biccirè, Francesco Elero d'Artegna	La Fenice	Venice
1996	6	La traviata (The Fallen Woman)	Verdi	Alfredo	Mariella Devia	Teatro Carlo Felice	Genoa, Italy
1997	7	Rigoletto	Verdi	Duke of Mantua		Teatro Lirico Giuseppe Verdi	Trieste, Italy
	8	I puritani (The Puritans)	Bellini	Arturo	Maureen O’Flynn, Alberto Mastromarino, Dean Peterson	Teatro Comunale di Bologna	Bologna, Italy
	9	Werther	Massenet	Werther	Denyce Graves	Teatro Carlo Felice	Genoa
	10	La fille du régiment (The Daughter of the Regiment)	Donizetti	Tonio	Angeles Blancas	Bilbao National Opera House	Bilbao, Spain
	11	Linda di Chamounix	Donizetti	Carlo	Mariella Devia, Alessandro Corbelli, Alastair Miles	Royal Albert Hall (temporary home of the Royal Opera House)	London
	12	Manon	Massenet	Le Chevalier des Grieux, or simply "des Grieux"		Teatro San Carlo	Naples, Italy
1998	13	Falstaff	Verdi	Fenton	Ruggero Raimondi, Dorothea Röschmann, Lucio Gallo; Claudio Abbado conductor	Berlin State Opera	Berlin
	14	Lucia di Lammermoor	Donizetti	Edgardo	Annick Massis, Boris Statsenko	Théâtre du Capitole	Toulouse, France
2000	15	Faust	Gounod	Faust	John Tomlinson, Angela-Maria Blasi, Roger Gilfry	National Theatre Munich	Munich
	16	Les contes d'Hoffmann (The Tales of Hoffmann)	Offenbach	Hoffmann	Desirée Rancatore, Irini Tsirakidis, Angela Gheorghiu, Michele Pertusi; Emmanuel Villaume conductor	Royal Opera House	London
	17	Der Rosenkavalier (The Knight of the Rose)	Strauss	Italian Singer	Susanne Mentzer, Cheryl Studer, Peter Rose	Metropolitan Opera House	New York City
2002	18	Lucia di Lammermoor	Donizetti	Edgard	Patrizia Ciofi, Ludovic Tezier, Marc Laho	Théâtre du Châtelet	Paris
	19	Lucrezia Borgia	Donizetti	Gennaro	Mariella Devia, Michele Pertusi, Daniela Barcellona; Renato Palumbo, conductor	Teatro degli Arcimboldi (temporary home of La Scala)	Milan
2003	20	La bohème	Puccini	Rodolfo	Cristina Gallardo-Domas, Roberto Servile, Hei-Kyung Hong	Teatro degli Arcimboldi (temporary home of La Scala)	Milan
	21	Luisa Miller	Verdi	Rodolfo	Barbara Frittoli, Carlo Guelfi, Ferruccio Furlanetto, Phillip Ens	Royal Opera House	London
2004	22	Roméo et Juliette	Gounod	Roméo	Angela-Maria Blasi	National Theatre Munich	Munich
2005	23	Un ballo in maschera (A Masked Ball)	Verdi	Gustavo (Riccardo)	Karita Mattila, Thomas Hampson (baritone)	Royal Opera House	London
2006	24	Il trovatore (The Troubadour)	Verdi	Manrico	Fiorenza Cedolins, Roberto Frontali, Marianne Cornetti; Renato Palumbo, conductor	Teatro Regio di Parma	Parma, Italy
	25	Tosca	Puccini	Cavaradossi	Angela Gheorghiu, Bryn Terfel; Antonio Pappano, conductor	Royal Opera House	London
2007	26	Carmen	Bizet	Don José	Beatrice Uria-Monzon, Àngel Òdena, Barbara Havemann; Günter Neuhold, conductor	Théâtre du Capitole	Toulouse
2009	27	Adriana Lecouvreur	Francesco Cilea	Maurizio	Micaela Carosi, Marianne Cornetti; Renato Palumbo, conductor	Teatro Regio di Torino	Turin, Italy
	28	Andrea Chénier	Umberto Giordano	Chénier	Micaela Carosi, Sergei Murzaev; Daniel Oren, conductor	Opéra National de Paris	Paris
2010	29	Aida	Verdi	Radames	Micaela Carosi, Marianne Cornetti	Royal Opera House	London
2011	30	La forza del destino	Verdi	Don Alvaro	Violeta Urmana, Vladimir Stoyanov; Phillipe Jordan, conductor	Opéra National de Paris	Paris
2013	31	La Gioconda	Ponchielli	Enzo Grimaldo	Violeta Urmana, Maria José Montiel, Claudio Sgura; Daniel Oren, conductor	Opéra National de Paris	Paris
2015	32	Pagliacci	Leoncavallo	Canio	Maria José Siri, Leo Nucci; Pinchas Steinberg, conductor	Opéra de Monte Carlo	Monte Carlo
	33	Cavalleria rusticana	Pietro Mascagni	Turiddu	Eva-Maria Westbroek, George Gagnidze; Fabio Luisi, conductor	Metropolitan Opera House	New York City
	34	Turandot	Giacomo Puccini	Calaf	Christine Goerke, Hibla Gerzmava, James Morris, Paolo Carignani, conductor	Metropolitan Opera House	New York City

== Discography (CD) ==
- Bel Canto, 1998, Sony Classical. Italian arias from the works of Verdi, Donizetti and Bellini
- Berlin Gala, 1999, Polygram Records. Berlin Gala concert of December 1998 with Mirella Freni, Simon Keenlyside, Christine Schäfer
- Marcelo Álvarez Sings Gardel, 2000, Sony Classical. Selections of Carlos Gardel's tangos, including a digitally-mastered duet of Álvarez singing with a 1934 recording of Carlos Gardel
- French Arias, 2001, Sony Classical. French arias from the works of Massenet, Offenbach, Donizetti, Gounod, Verdi, Meyerbeer, and Rossini
- Duetto performed with Salvatore Licitra, 2003, Sony Classical. Original works composed for Álvarez and Licitra as well as variations on classical compositions and arias
- Manon – Massenet, 2003, Sony Classical. Performance of July 2001 by the Opéra National de Paris at Théâtre de la Bastille with Renée Fleming
- The Tenor's Passion, 2004, Sony Classical. Italian and French masterpieces
- Lucia di Lammermoor – Donizetti, 2005, La Voce, Inc. Performance of August 2004 in Tokyo, with Mariella Devia and Renato Bruson
- Festliche Operngala, 2005, RCA. Deutschen Oper concert benefit for AIDS research, Berlin, with Lucia Aliberti, Maria Bayo
- Marcelo Álvarez: The Verdi Tenor, 2009, Decca. Eighteen arias, including "Celeste Aida", "Di quella pira" from Il trovatore, and Otello's "Niun mi tema"
- Marcelo Álvarez: Tenorissimo!, 2010, Sony Classical. Seventeen arias collected from previous recordings of works including Puccini's "La bohème" and "Tosca", and Umberto Giordano's "Andrea Chénier"
- Adriana Lecouvreur - Cilea, 2011, Dynamic. Performance of July 2009 in Turino, Italy with Micaela Carosi and Marianne Cornetti
- Marcelo Álvarez: 20 Years on the Opera Stage, 2014, Delos. St. Petersburg State Symphony Orchestra, Constantine Orbellian, conductor. Fifteen selections, including previously unrecorded arias Vesti la giubba from Leoncavallo's "Pagliacci" as well as Puccini's "Turandot" and "La fanciulla del west"

== Filmography (DVD and/or Blu-ray) ==
- Marcelo Álvarez In Search of Gardel, 2000, Bullfrog Films. Documentary film about the life of Carlos Gardel and the making of the album, Marcelo Álvarez Sings Gardel
- Songs of Love & Desire, 2002, TDK. Berlin Gala concert of December 1998 with Mirella Freni, Christine Schäfer, Simon Keenlyside
- Verdi Gala, 2002, TDK. Concert of March 2001 at the Teatro Padiglione Palacassa in Parma, Italy with Plácido Domingo, José Carreras, and José Cura
- Rigoletto – Verdi, 2002, BBC Opus Arte. Performance of September 2001 at the Royal Opera House, London with Paolo Gavanelli, Christine Schäfer
- Manon – Massenet, 2003, TDK. Performance of July 2001 by the Opéra National de Paris at Théâtre de la Bastille with Renée Fleming
- Duetto, 2003, Sony Classical. Performance with Salvatore Licitra plus behind-the-scenes extras from a concert at the Colosseum in Rome, June 2003
- Lucia di Lammermoor – Donizetti, 2004, TDK. Performance of June 2003 in Genoa with Stefania Bonfadelli and Roberto Frontali
- La Bohème – Puccini, 2004, TDK. Performance of February 2003 at the Teatro degli Arcimboldi (La Scala ensemble), Milan with Cristina Gallardo-Domas, Hei-Kyung Hong, Roberto Servile
- Lucia di Lammermoor – Donizetti, 2005, La Voce, Inc. Performance of August 2004 in Tokyo with Mariella Devia and Renato Bruson, includes interviews in Italian
- Giuseppe Verdi's Rigoletto Story, 2005, Roadhouse Movie. Performance of August 2002 in Siena, Italy with Roberto Servile and Inva Mula
- Mariella Devia & Marcelo Álvarez, 2005, La Voce, Inc. Concert of August 2004 in Tokyo
- Werther – Massenet, 2005, TDK. Performance of February 2005 at the Vienna State Opera with Elīna Garanča, includes interview and Opernball excerpts
- Festliche Operngala, 2005, United Motion. Deutschen Oper concert benefit for AIDS research, November 2005, Berlin with Lucia Aliberti and Maria Bayo
- DVD Sampler Opera ‘06, 2006, TDK. Selections featuring Álvarez, Renée Fleming, Karita Mattila, and Plácido Domingo
- Rigoletto – Verdi, 2006, TDK. Performance of December 2004 at the Liceu in Barcelona, Spain with Carlos Alvarez and Inva Mula
- Tosca – Puccini, 2007, TDK. Performance of July 2006 at Arena di Verona with Fiorenza Cedolins and Ruggero Raimondi
- Un ballo in maschera - Verdi, 2010, Opus Arte. Performance of September 2008 at the Teatro Real in Madrid, Spain with Violeta Urmana, Marco Vratogna, and Elena Zaremba. Available in DVD and Blu-ray disc.
- Adriana Lecouvreur – Cilea, 2010, Arthaus Musik. Performance of June 2009 at the Teatro Regio in Turin with Micaela Carosi and Marianne Cornetti
- Tosca - Puccini, 2010, Virgin Classics. Live performance from the Met in New York City with Karita Mattila and George Gagnidze; Joseph Colaneri - conductor
- Il trovatore - Verdi, 2012, Deutsche Grammophon. Live performance from the Met with Sondra Radvanovsky, Dolora Zajick, and Dmitri Hvorostovsky; Marco Armiliato - conductor
- Un Ballo in Maschera - Verdi, 2013, Deutsche Grammophon. Live performance from the Met with Dmitri Hvorostovsky, Sondra Radvanovsky and Stephanie Blythe; Fabio Luisi - Conductor
- Verdi Box Set: Falstaff, Rigoletto, Il trovatore, 2012, BBC Opus Arte. Director David McVicar at the Royal Opera House with Dmitri Hvorostovsky, Sondra Radvanovsky, Paolo Gavanelli and Christine Schäfer
- Luisa Miller - Verdi, 2012, Unitel Classica. Teatro Regio di Parma with Fiorenza Cedolins and Leo Nucci

== Awards ==
- 1995 – Winner, regional voice competition in Pavia, Italy
- 1995 - Second prize, inaugural Leyla Gencer Voice Competition in Istanbul, Turkey
- 2000 – Gold Camera Award, 33rd Annual International Film and Video Festival
- 2000 – Honorable mention, Columbus International Film and Video Festival
- 2000 – Singer of The Year, Echo Klassik (German Audioworks Cultural Institute)
- 2002 – Singer of The Year, Echo Klassik
- 2003 – Best Tenor of The Year, 2002, as voted by readers of Italian L’Opera magazine
- 2007 – La Martesana Opera Award, presented by OperaClick and Associazione Musicale Harmonia
