= Vráž =

Vráž may refer to places in the Czech Republic:

- Vráž (Beroun District), a municipality and village in the Central Bohemian Region
- Vráž (Písek District), a municipality and village in the South Bohemian Region
- Vráž, a hamlet and part of Dlažov in the Plzeň Region
- Vráž, a hamlet and part of Ostředek in the Central Bohemian Region
