= I puritani discography =

Recordings of Bellini's 1835 opera

This is a list of audio and video recordings of I puritani (The Puritans), an opera in three acts by Vincenzo Bellini with a libretto by Count Carlo Pepoli, based on Têtes Rondes et Cavaliers (Roundheads and Cavaliers), a historical play written by Jacques-François Ancelot and Joseph Xavier Saintine and set in the English Civil War. It was premiered on 24 January 1835 by the Théâtre-Italien at the first Salle Favart in Paris.

== Audio recordings ==
Year	Cast (Elvira, Arturo, Riccardo, Giorgio)	Conductor, Opera house and orchestra	Label
1952	Lina Pagliughi, Mario Filippeschi, Rolando Panerai, Sesto Bruscantini	Fernando Previtali, Orchestra and Chorus of the RAI Rome (Recorded from a broadcast, 5 January)	CD: Bongiovanni; Cat: GB 1170/1-2; Urania; Cat: URN 22.203
1952	Maria Callas, Giuseppe Di Stefano, Piero Campolonghi, Roberto Silva	Guido Picco, Palacio de Bellas Artes Orchestra and Chorus (Recorded live, 29 May 1952)	CD: Opera Depot; Cat: 10826-2
1953	Maria Callas, Giuseppe Di Stefano, Rolando Panerai, Nicola Rossi-Lemeni	Tullio Serafin, La Scala Orchestra and Chorus (First studio recording, March 24–30)	CD: EMI; Cat: 585 647-2
1957	Virginia Zeani, Mario Filippeschi, Aldo Protti, Andrea Mongelli	Francesco Molinari Pradelli, Teatro Lirico Giuseppe Verdi Orchestra and Chorus (Recorded live, 2 February 1957)	CD: Bongiovanni; Cat: GB 1195–1196
1959?	Anna Moffo, Gianni Raimondi, Ugo Savarese, Raffaele Arié	Mario Rossi, Orchestra and Chorus of the RAI Milan (Broadcast on 20 February 1960)	CD: Premiere Opera Ltd., Cat: CDNO 1448-2; Opera Depot, Cat: OD
1960	Joan Sutherland, Nicola Filacuridi, Ernest Blanc, Giuseppe Modesti	Vittorio Gui, Royal Philharmonic Orchestra, Glyndebourne Chorus (Recorded live, Glyndebourne Festival, 18 July)	CD: Glyndebourne Omega Opera Archive, Cat: 1398
1961	Leyla Gencer, Gianni Raimondi, Manuel Ausensi, Ferruccio Mazzoli	Argeo Quadri, Teatro Colón Orchestra and Chorus (Recorded live, June or July 1961)	LP: Black Disk – foyer Cat: FO 1024; CD: Myto Records
1963	Joan Sutherland, Pierre Duval, Renato Capecchi, Ezio Flagello	Richard Bonynge, Coro e Orchestra del Maggio Musicale Fiorentino	CD: Decca, Cat: 448 969-2
1969	Mirella Freni, Luciano Pavarotti, Sesto Bruscantini, Bonaldo Giaiotti	Riccardo Muti, Orchestra and Chorus of the RAI Rome (Recorded live, 8 July 1969)	CD: Melodram; Cat: MEL 27062-2
1971	Adriana Maliponte, Alfredo Kraus, Piero Cappuccilli, Ruggero Raimondi	Gianandrea Gavazzeni, Teatro Bellini di Catania Orchestra and Chorus (Recorded live, 27 January 1971 or 6 February 1972)	CD: Opera Depot; Cat: 10379-2
1973	Beverly Sills, Nicolai Gedda, Louis Quilico, Paul Plishka	Julius Rudel, London Philharmonic Orchestra and Ambrosian Opera Chorus	CD: Westminster The Legacy; Cat: 471 207-2
1973	Joan Sutherland, Luciano Pavarotti, Piero Cappuccilli, Nicolai Ghiaurov	Richard Bonynge, London Symphony Orchestra and chorus of the Royal Opera House	CD: London; Cat: POCL 2896-8
1979	Montserrat Caballé, Alfredo Kraus, Matteo Manuguerra, Agostino Ferrin	Riccardo Muti, Philharmonia Orchestra, Ambrosian Opera Chorus	CD: EMI Classics; Cat: 5 09149
2024	Lisette Oropesa, Lawrence Brownlee, Anthony Clark Evans, Riccardo Zanellato	Riccardo Frizza, MDR-Rundfunkchor, Dresden Philharmonie	CD: Euroarts, 8024211121 (complete score)

== Video recordings ==
Year	Cast (Elvira, Arturo, Riccardo, Giorgio)	Conductor, Opera house and orchestra	Label
2007	Anna Netrebko, Eric Cutler, Franco Vassallo, John Relyea	Patrick Summers, Metropolitan Opera Orchestra and Chorus (Production: Sandro Sequi; set designer: Ming Cho Lee; costume designer: Peter J. Hall; recorded live, 6 January)	Blu-ray/DVD: DG; Online: Met Opera on Demand
2009	Nino Machaidze, Juan Diego Flórez, Gabriele Viviani, Ildebrando D'Arcangelo	Michele Mariotti, Orchestra and Chorus of the Teatro Comunale di Bologna (Stage director: Pier'Alli; recorded live, Teatro Comunale)	Blu-ray/DVD: Decca
2009	Mariola Cantarero, John Osborn, Scott Hendricks, Riccardo Zanellato	Giuliano Carella, Netherlands Philharmonic Orchestra, Chorus of the Dutch National Opera (Stage director: Francisco Negrin; recorded live, February; Paris version)	Blu-ray/DVD: Opus Arte; Online: medici.tv
2016	Diana Damrau, Javier Camarena, Ludovic Tézier, Nicolas Testé	Evelino Pidò, Chorus and Orchestra of the Teatro Real, Madrid (Stage director: Emilio Sagi; recorded live, July 2016)	Blu-ray/DVD: BelAir Classiques; Online: medici.tv
2018	Ana Durlovski, René Barbera, Gëzim Myshketa, Adam Palka	Manlio Benzi, Stuttgart State Orchestra, Stuttgart State Opera Chorus (Stage directors: Jossi Wieler & Sergio Morabito; recorded live, 17 & 24 July)	Blu-ray/DVD/Online: Naxos
2026	Lisette Oropesa, Lawrence Brownlee, Ricardo José Rivera, Christian Van Horn	Marco Armiliato, Metropolitan Opera Orchestra & Chorus (Director-designer: Charles Edwards; recorded live, 10 January 2026)	HD video: Met Opera on Demand
