= Giuseppe Verdi's Rigoletto Story =

2005 operatic performance film

- Directed by: Gianfranco Fozzi
- Produced by: David Guido Pietroni; Maurizio De Santis
- Release date: 2002
- Running time: 126 minutes
- Language: Italian

Giuseppe Verdi's Rigoletto Story (2005) is a film version of Giuseppe Verdi's 1851 opera Rigoletto (libretto by Francesco Maria Piave). Filmed in Siena in 2002, it was directed by Gianfranco Fozzi and produced by David Guido Pietroni and Maurizio De Santis distributed worldwide by Columbia TriStar Home Entertainment and Sony Pictures Home Entertainment.

== Cast ==
- Rigoletto, the Duke's jester (baritone) – Roberto Servile
- Gilda, his daughter (soprano) – Inva Mula
- Duke of Mantua (tenor) – Marcelo Álvarez
- Sparafucile, an assassin (bass) – Andrea Silvestrelli
- Maddalena, his sister (mezzo-soprano) – Svetlana Serdar
- Giovanna, Gilda's Nurse (mezzo-soprano) – Paola Leveroni
- Count Ceprano (bass) – Boschetti Giulio
- Countess Ceprano, his wife (mezzo-soprano) – Emilia Bertoncello
- Matteo Borsa, a courtier (tenor) – Giovanni Maini
- Count Monterone (baritone) – Cesare Lana
- Marullo (baritone) Andrea Cortese

== Film details ==
- Film Company: Roadhouse Movie
- Label: Columbia TriStar Home Entertainment, Sony Pictures Home Entertainment
- Producers: David Guido Pietroni and Maurizio De Santis
- Stage director: Vittorio Sgarbi
- Film director: Gianfranco Fozzi
- Post Production: Christian Verzino
- Costume Designer: Vivienne Westwood
- Conductor: Keri-Lynn Wilson
- Orchestra: Arturo Toscanini Foundation
- Runtime: USA: 126 minutes
- Country: Italy
- Language: Italian
- Sound Mix: Celeste Frigo, Mauro Casazza
- Certification: Australia:G / UK:U
- Bonus: Exclusive comic book inside "Rigoletto comix" by Enrico Simonato
