= Nadia Krasteva =

Bulgarian mezzo-soprano

- Born: Sofia, Bulgaria
- Education: Pancho Vladigerov National Academy of Music
- Occupation: Mezzo-soprano

Nadia Krasteva is a Bulgarian mezzo-soprano. She was a Vienna State Opera company member from 2002 to 2012, and has sung lead roles at most of the world's leading opera houses.

== Early life ==
Krasteva was born in Sofia, Bulgaria. She studied there at the Pancho Vladigerov National Academy of Music, followed by further training in Vienna, and with Anita Cerquetti in Rome.

== Career ==
Krasteva started her operatic career in Bulgaria in 2001, where she had her stage debut as Sally Bowles in the musical Cabaret at the Stefan Makedonski National Music Theatre in Sofia.

In 2002, Krasteva joined the Vienna State Opera, where she was a member of their ensemble from September 2002 to June 2012, making her stage debut as Fenena in Verdi's Nabucco, and performing in more than thirty roles, including Princess Eboli, Leonor de Guzman, Sara, Preziosilla, Marina, Olga, and Suzuki.

Krasteva has sung the Bavarian State Opera in Munich, Vienna State Opera, Teatro alla Scala in Milan, Dutch National Opera, Berlin State Opera, Deutsche Oper Berlin, Paris Opera, Zurich Opera, Palau de les Arts Reina Sofia in Valencia, Semperoper Dresden, Theater an der Wien, Arena di Verona, Metropolitan Opera, San Francisco Opera, Chicago Lyric Opera, Bolshoi Theatre in Moscow and at the Teatro Colón in Buenos Aires. She has worked with a number of conductors in different opera productions, including Andris Nelsons, Emmanuel Villaume, Christian Thielemann, Simon Rattle, Peter Schneider, Eivind Gullberg Jensen, Carlos Vieu, Ernst Märzendorfer, Koen Schoots, Nayden Todorov, Peter Schmelzer and Grzegorz Nowak.

In 2008, Krasteva made her Bolshoi Theatre debut in its premiere production of Carmen in the title role, in a production conducted by Yuri Temirkanov, and directed by David Pountney.

Krasteva made her debut with the San Francisco Opera in their 2015/16 season, singing Princess Eboli, in Verdi's Don Carlo, a role she had already performed with Metropolitan Opera and Semperoper Dresden. Krasteva makes her Royal Opera House in the 2017/18 season, singing Maddalena in Verdi's Rigoletto.

In the following years, Krasteva continued to appear in major international productions. In 2018 she sang Amneris in Verdi's Aida at Teatro Colón in Buenos Aires, and also appeared in Rusalka at the Vienna State Opera. In 2022 she returned to the United States as Maddalena in Verdi's Rigoletto at The Dallas Opera, where she had previously made her company debut in Aida during the 2012/13 season.
