= Rusalka (opera) =

1901 opera by Antonín Dvořák

- Opera by Antonín Dvořák
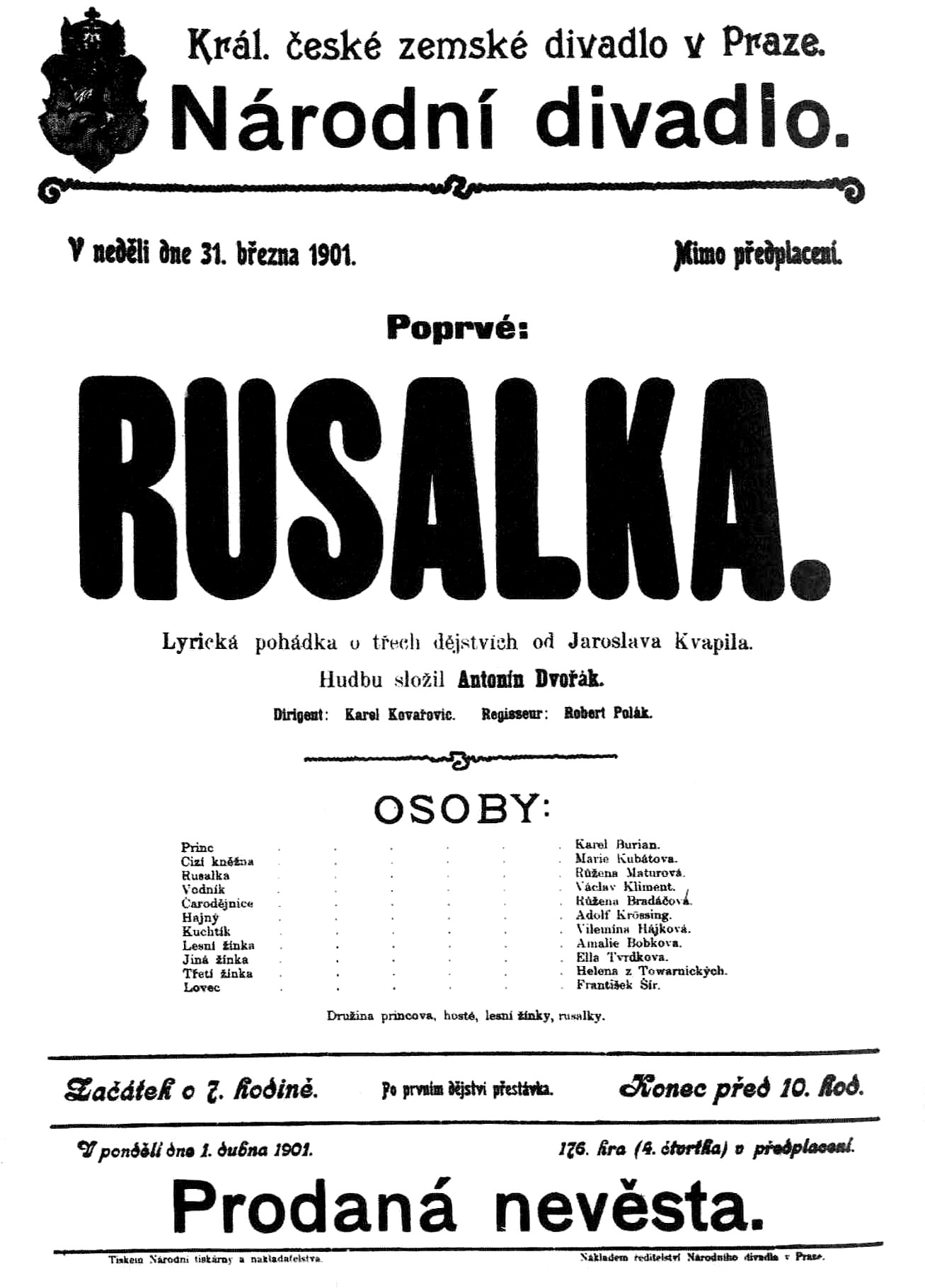
- Poster for the premiere
- Librettist: Jaroslav Kvapil
- Language: Czech
- Based on: fairy tales by Karel Jaromír Erben and Božena Němcová
- Premiere: 31 March 1901; Prague

Rusalka (pronounced [ˈrusalka]), Op. 114, is an opera ('lyric fairy tale') by Antonín Dvořák. His ninth opera (1900–1901), it became his most successful, frequenting the standard repertoire worldwide. Jaroslav Kvapil wrote the libretto on Karel Jaromír Erben's and Božena Němcová's fairy tales. The rusalka is a water sprite from Slavic mythology; it usually inhabits a lake or river.

For many years unfamiliarity with Dvořák's operas outside the Czech lands helped reinforce a perception that composition of operas was a marginal activity, and that despite the beauty of its melodies and orchestral timbres Rusalka was not a central part of his output or of international lyric theatre. In recent years it has been performed more regularly by major opera companies. It is performed by opera companies worldwide far more than all of Dvořák's other operas combined.

The most popular excerpt from Rusalka is the soprano aria, the "Song to the Moon" ("Měsíčku na nebi hlubokém") for the title character in act 1, which is often performed in concert and recorded separately. It has also been arranged for violin and used on film soundtracks.

== Composition history ==
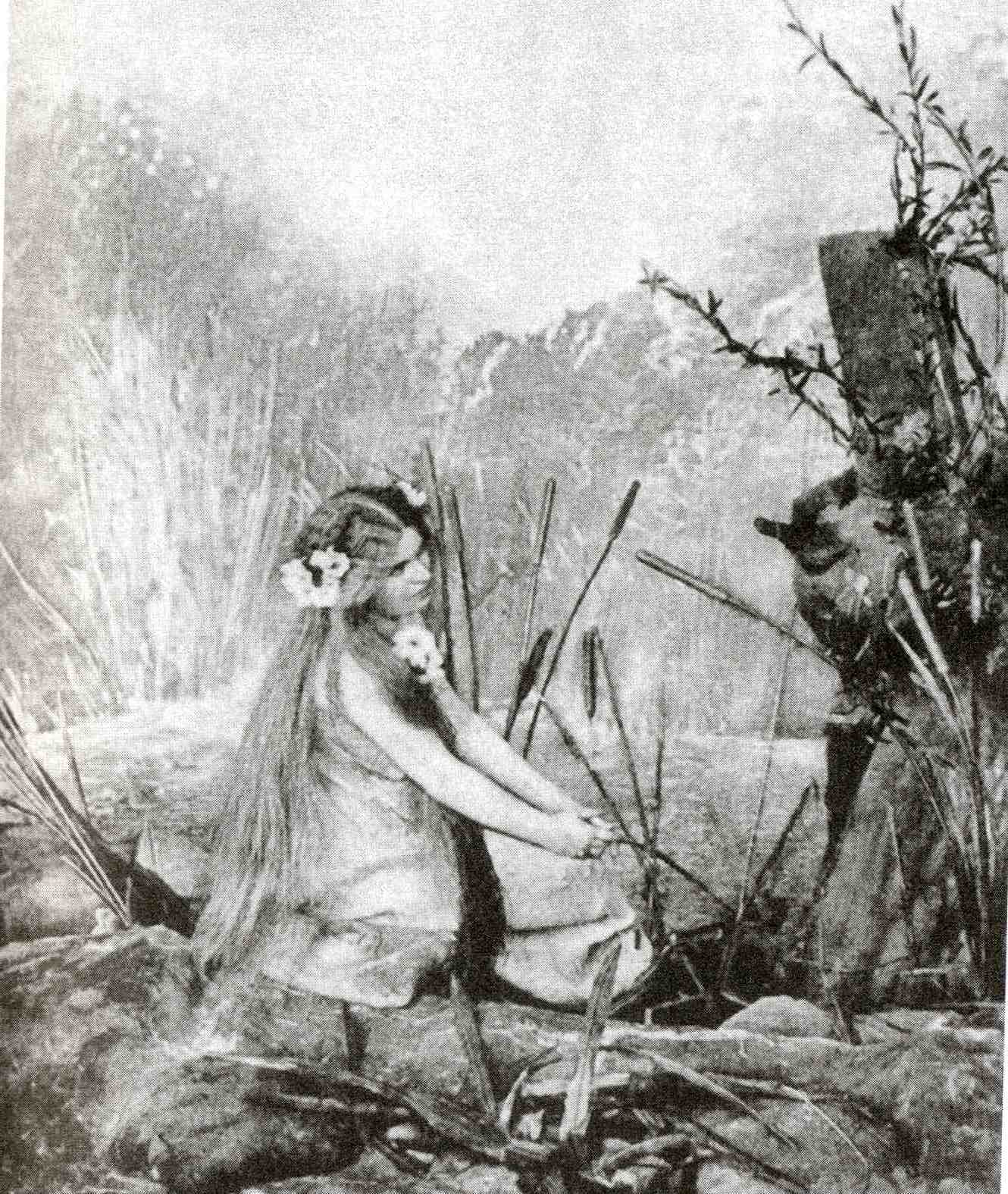
Růžena Maturová as the first Rusalka

Dvořák had played viola for pit orchestras in Prague (the Estates Theatre from 1857 until 1859 while a student, then from 1862 until 1871 at the Provisional Theatre). He thus had direct experience of a wide range of operas by Mozart, Weber, Rossini, Lortzing, Wagner, Verdi as well as his compatriot Smetana.

Kvapil's libretto was written before he had any contact with the composer. The plot contains elements which also appear in The Little Mermaid by Hans Christian Andersen and in Undine by Friedrich de la Motte Fouqué, and has been described as a "sad, modern fairy tale", in a similar vein to his previous play, Princessa Pampeliška. The libretto was completed by 1899, when Kvapil began looking for composers interested in setting his text to music. His composer friends were engaged with other works, but mentioned that Dvořák was looking for a project. The composer, always interested in Erben's stories, read the libretto and composed his opera quite rapidly, with the first draft begun on 22 April 1900 and completed by the end of November. Coming after his four symphonic poems inspired by the folk-ballads of Erben of 1896–97, Rusalka may be viewed as the culmination of Dvořák's exploration of a "wide variety of drama-creating musical techniques".

== Performance history ==
Rusalka was first performed in Prague on 31 March 1901, with Růžena Maturová as the first Rusalka. It became an enormous success in Czech lands, and soon gained success also abroad. Shortly after the premiere Dvořák was in contact with Mahler, then at the Vienna Court Opera about mounting the work there, and having met Mahler signed a contract for a production to take place, but this fell through.

The first performance outside Bohemia took place in Ljubljana. The opera was given in Vienna by a Czech company in 1910; in German translation it was given in Stuttgart in 1935.

The UK stage premiere was given by John Lewis Opera at Peter Jones, Sloane Square in May 1950. The Times commented: "It is left to amateurs to stage for us those operas by composers howsoever eminent which do not get into the international repertory". The first professional performances were at Sadler's Wells Theatre in 1959; a 1983 production by English National Opera was filmed and revived several times.

The United States premiere of the opera was presented by the San Diego Opera in 1975 with Kathryn Bouleyn in the title role. Rusalka was first performed in New York at the Metropolitan Opera in 1993, a production from the Vienna State Opera, directed by Otto Schenk, with Gabriela Beňačková and Neil Rosenshein. The Australian premiere in 2007 by Opera Australia with Cheryl Barker in the title role and Richard Hickox conducting won the Helpmann Award for Best Opera.

== Roles ==
Roles, voice types, premiere cast
Role	Voice type	Premiere cast, 31 March 1901 Conductor: Karel Kovařovic
Rusalka, a water nymph	soprano	Růžena Maturová
The Prince	tenor	Bohumil Pták
Vodník, the water sprite	bass	Václav Kliment
The Foreign Princess	mezzo-soprano	Marie Kubátová
Ježibaba, a witch	contralto	Růžena Vykoukalová-Bradáčová
First wood nymph	soprano	Amalie Bobková
Second wood nymph	soprano	Ella Tvrdková
Third wood nymph	contralto	Helena Towarnická
Gamekeeper	tenor	Adolf Krössing
Turnspit/Kitchen boy	soprano	Vilemína Hájková
Hunter	baritone	František Šír
Chorus: Wood nymphs, guests at the castle, entourage of the prince

== Synopsis ==
=== Act 1 ===
"Song to the Moon" (orchestrated for band)
Performed by the United States Navy Band, 2015

"Song to the Moon" (sung in German: "Lieblicher Mond")
Performed by Emmy Destinn, 1915

A meadow by the edge of a lake

Three wood sprites tease the water goblin, Vodník, ruler of the lake. His daughter Rusalka, a water nymph, tells him that she has fallen in love with a human prince who comes to hunt around the lake, and she wants to become human to embrace him. He tells her it is a bad idea, but nonetheless steers her to a witch, Ježibaba, for assistance. Rusalka sings her "Song to the Moon," asking it to tell the prince of her love. Ježibaba tells Rusalka that, if she becomes human, she will lose the power of speech and immortality; moreover, if she does not find love with the prince, he will die and she will be eternally damned. Rusalka agrees to the terms and drinks a potion. The prince, hunting a white doe, finds Rusalka, embraces her, and leads her away, as her father and sisters lament.

=== Act 2 ===
The garden of the prince's castle

A gamekeeper and his nephew, the kitchen boy, note that the prince is to be married to a mute and nameless bride. They suspect witchcraft and doubt it will last, as the prince is already lavishing attentions on a foreign princess who is a wedding guest. The foreign princess, jealous, curses the couple. The prince rejects Rusalka. Rusalka then goes back to the lake with her father the water goblin. Though she has now won the prince's affections, the foreign princess is disgusted by the prince's fickleness and betrayal and she scorns him, telling him to follow his rejected bride to Hell.

=== Act 3 ===
A meadow by the edge of a lake

Rusalka returns to the lake and laments about her fate. She meets Ježibaba and asks for a solution to her woes. Ježibaba gives her a knife and tells her that she can save herself if she kills the prince with it. Rusalka rejects this, throwing the dagger into the lake. Rusalka becomes a will-o'-the-wisp, a spirit of death living in the depths of the lake, emerging only to lure humans to their deaths. The gamekeeper and the kitchen boy are worried about the deteriorating condition of the prince, and go to the lake in order to get rid of Rusalka. They meet Ježibaba and lash out on Rusalka's betrayal, but are rebutted by the water goblin, who says that it was actually the prince that betrayed Rusalka. The wood sprites mourn Rusalka's plight. The prince, searching for his white doe, comes to the lake, senses Rusalka, and calls for her. Rusalka appears and is now able to speak to him. He asks her to kiss him, even knowing her kiss means death. They kiss and he dies; and the water goblin comments that all sacrifices are futile. In her final song, Rusalka tells the prince, "For your love, for that beauty of yours, for your inconstant human passion, for everything by which my fate is cursed, human soul, God have mercy on you!"

== Instrumentation ==
Rusalka is scored for 2 flutes, 1 piccolo, 2 oboes, 1 English horn, 2 clarinets, 1 bass clarinet, 2 bassoons, 4 horns, 3 trumpets, 3 trombones, 1 tuba, timpani, triangle, cymbals, bass drum, harmonium, harp and strings.

== Music ==
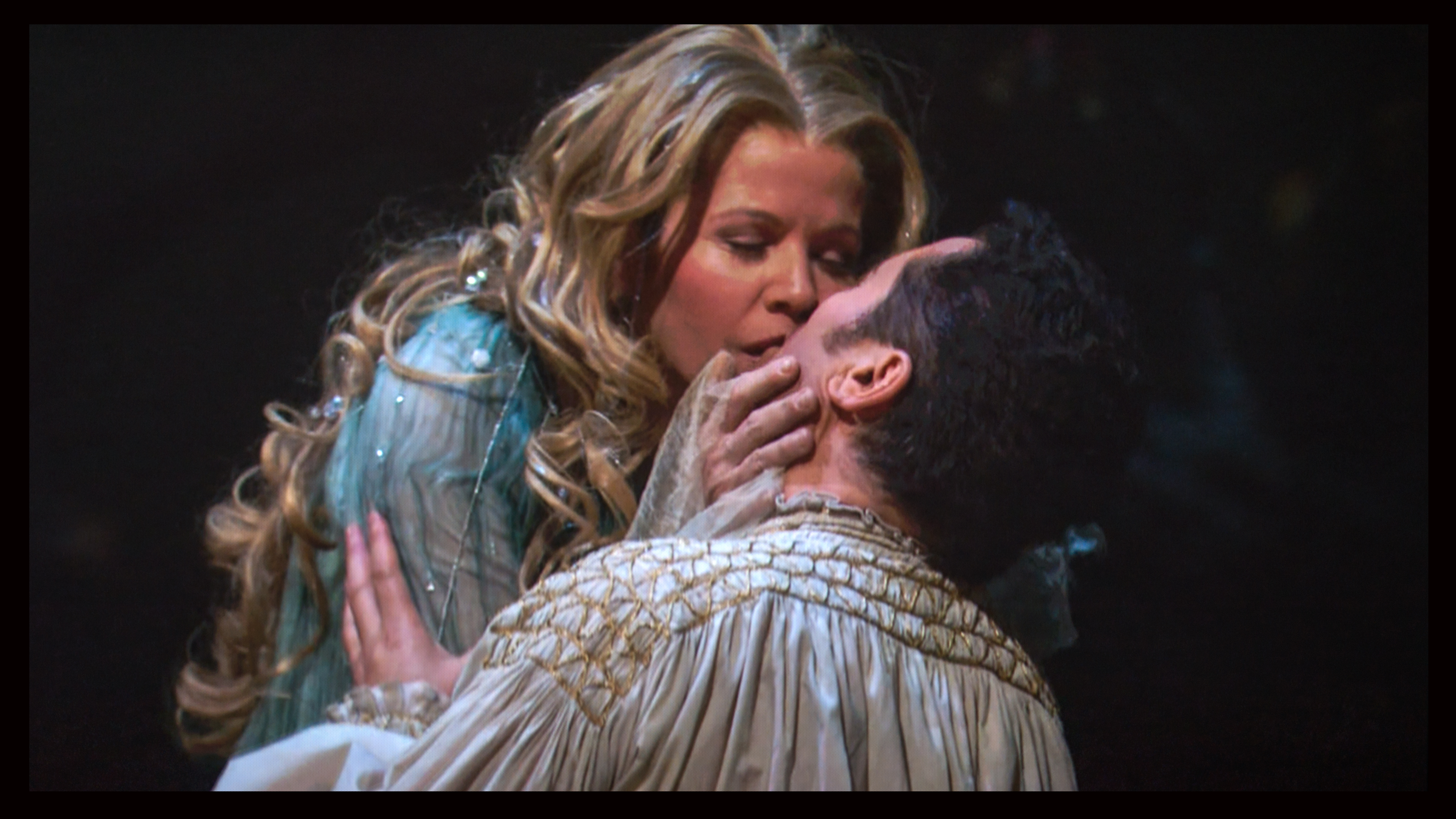
Rusalka and the Prince (Renée Fleming, Piotr Beczała, Metropolitan Opera 2014)

Dvořák's music is generally through-composed and uses motifs for Rusalka, her damnation, the water sprite and the forest. His word-setting is expressive while allowing for nationally inflected passages, and Grove judges that the work shows the composer at the height of his maturity. He uses established theatrical devices – dance sections, comedy (Gamekeeper and Turnspit) and pictorial musical depiction of nature (forest and lake). Rodney Milnes (who provided the translation for an ENO production) admired the "wealth of melodic patterns that are dramatic in themselves and its shimmering orchestration". One writer considers the final section of the opera – the duet for the prince and Rusalka ("Líbej mne, líbej, mír mi přej") – as "[twelve] or so of the most glorious minutes in all opera" in their "majestic, almost hymnic solemnity" while another describes the opera as a "vivid, profoundly disturbing drama".

In 2014, Slovak conductor and composer Marián Lejava produced a version for chamber orchestra that premiered at Theater Orchester Biel Solothurn in Switzerland that same year and has later been performed in other performing venues.

== Recordings ==
Year	Cast (Rusalka, The prince, Vodník, Foreign princess, Ježibaba)	Conductor, Opera house and orchestra	Label
1952	Ludmila Červinková, Beno Blachut, Eduard Haken, Marie Podvalová, Marta Krásová	Jaroslav Krombholc, Prague National Theatre Chorus and Orchestra	CD: Supraphon; Cat: SU 3811-2
1961	Milada Šubrtová, Ivo Žídek, Eduard Haken, Alena Miková, Marie Ovčáčiková	Zdeněk Chalabala, Prague National Theatre Chorus and Orchestra	LP: Supraphon; Cat: SU 50440 3
1984	Gabriela Beňačková, Wiesław Ochman, Richard Novák, Drahomíra Drobková, Věra Soukupová	Václav Neumann, Czech Philharmonic & Prague Philharmonic Choir	CD: Supraphon (re-issue in 2003); Cat: SU 3178-2 633
1986	Eilene Hannan, John Treleaven, Rodney Macann, Phyllis Cannan, Ann Howard	Mark Elder, Orchestra and chorus of English National Opera, (Sung in English; director David Pountney)	DVD: Arthaus Musik (released 2006); Cat: 102 019
1997	Ursula Furi-Bernhard, Walter Coppola, Marcel Rosca, Tiziana K. Sojat, Nelly Boschkova	Alexander Rahbari, Zagreb Philharmonic Orchestra & Ivan Goran Kovačić Academic Choir	CD: Brilliant Classics; Cat: 93968
1998	Renée Fleming, Ben Heppner, Franz Hawlata, Eva Urbanová, Dolora Zajick	Charles Mackerras, Czech Philharmonic & Kühn Mixed Choir	CD: Decca; Cat: 000289 460 5682 0
2002	Renée Fleming, Sergei Larin, Franz Hawlata; Eva Urbanová, Larissa Diadkova	James Conlon, Orchestra and chorus of the Opéra de Paris	DVD: Arthaus Musik (re-issue in 2009), Cat: 107 031
2007	Cheryl Barker, Rosario La Spina, Bruce Martin, Elizabeth Whitehouse, Anne-Marie Owens	Richard Hickox, Australian Opera and Ballet Orchestra, Opera Australia Chorus	CD: Chandos, Cat: CHAN 10449(3)
2008	Camilla Nylund, Piotr Beczała, Alan Held; Emily Magee, Birgit Remmert	Franz Welser-Möst, Cleveland Orchestra	CD: Orfeo, Cat: C792113D
2009	Ana María Martínez, Brandon Jovanovich, Mischa Schelomianski, Tatiana Pavlovskaya, Larissa Diadkova	Jiří Bělohlávek, London Philharmonic Orchestra and the Glyndebourne Chorus	CD: Glyndebourne Festival Opera; Cat: GFOCD 007-09
2011	Kristine Opolais, Klaus Florian Vogt, Gunther Groissbock, Nadia Krasteva, Janina Baechle	Tomáš Hanus (conductor) & Martin Kušej (stage director), Bayerisches Staatsorchester	Blu-ray and DVD: C Major; Cat: 706504
2014	Myrtó Papatanasiu, Pavel Černoch, Annalena Persson, Willard White, Renée Morloc	Julian Hubbard, La Monnaie Symphony and Chorus	DVD and Blu-ray Disc: EuroArts (DVD label); Cat: 2059928
2021	Asmik Grigorian, Eric Cutler, Maxim Kuzmin-Karavaev, Karita Mattila, Katarina Dalayman	Ivor Bolton (conductor), Christof Loy (stage director), Teatro Real	Blu-ray and DVD: C Major; Cat: 759604
