= Franca Mattiucci =

Italian operatic mezzo-soprano

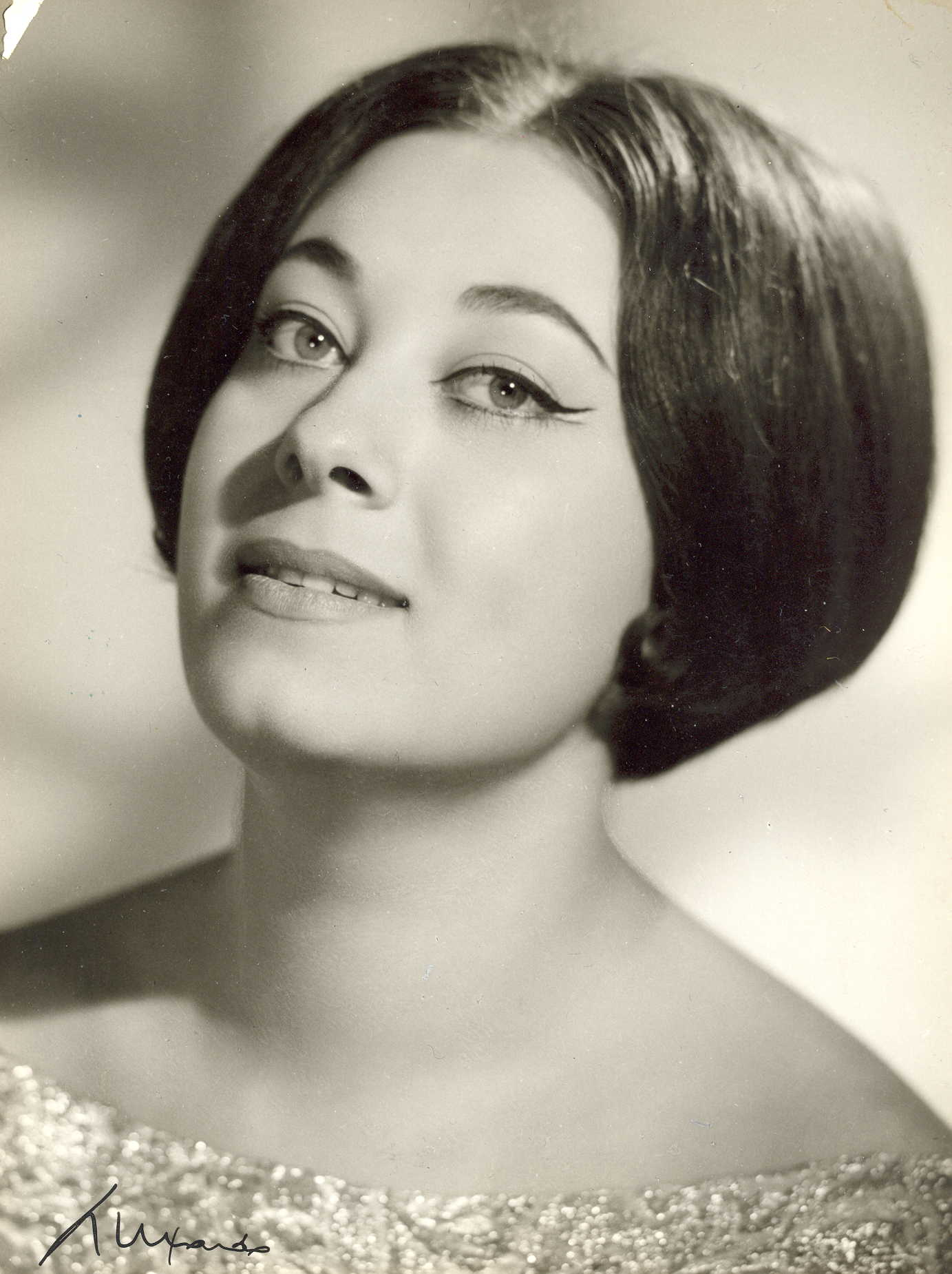
Franca Mattiucci

Franca Mattiucci (born 1938 in Rome, Italy) is an Italian operatic mezzo-soprano who had an active international career from 1963 to 1987. In her native country she made appearances at the Arena di Verona Festival, the Baths of Caracalla, La Fenice, La Scala, the Teatro Comunale di Bologna, the Teatro della Pergola, the Teatro dell'Opera di Roma, the Teatro di San Carlo, the Teatro Donizetti, the Teatro Margherita, the Teatro Massimo Bellini, the Teatro Massimo, the Teatro Regio di Parma, and the Teatro Regio di Torino. On the international stage she performed at the Hamburg State Opera, the Hungarian State Opera, the Liceu, the Lyric Opera of Chicago, the Opéra de Monte-Carlo, the Sofia National Opera, the Teatro Colón, the Teatro Nacional de São Carlos, the Teatro Real, and the Vienna State Opera among others.

Some of the roles Mattiucci performed on stage were Adalgisa in Norma, Amneris in Aida, Azucena in Il trovatore, Beppe in L'amico Fritz, Charlotte in Werther, Climene in Saffo, Dalila in Samson et Dalila, Dorabella in Così fan tutte, Fenena in Nabucco, Giovanna in Anna Bolena, Jocasta in Oedipus rex, Laura Adorno in La Gioconda, Leonor in La favorite, Margarita in I quattro rusteghi, Marina in Boris Godunov, Preziosilla in La forza del destino, the Princess in Suor Angelica, Princess Eboli in Don Carlo, Santuzza in Cavalleria Rusticana, Sinaide in Mosè in Egitto, Suzuki in Madame Butterfly, Ulrica in Un ballo in maschera, and the title roles in Carmen and Mignon.

After retiring from the stage in 1987, Mattiucci embarked on a second career as a voice teacher. Her notable pupils include Marcelo Álvarez, Linda Campanella, Serena Gamberoni, Cho Kyoung, Natalia Lemercier Miretti, Francesco Meli, Monica Minarelli, Patrizia Patelmo, Matteo Peirone, Tatiana Serjan, and Erwin Schrott.
