= Marie Podvalová =

Czech opera singer (1909–1992)

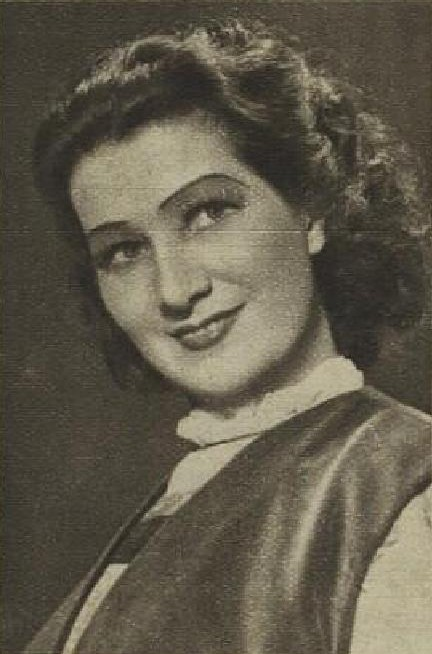
- Marie Podvalová

Background information
- Born: 5 September 1909; Čakovice, Austria-Hungary
- Died: 16 May 1992 (aged 82) Prague, Czechoslovakia
- Genres: Opera
- Occupation: Singer
- Instrument: Vocals

Marie Podvalová (5 September 1909 – 16 May 1992) was a Czech opera singer who had a long career at the National Theatre in Prague from 1936 to 1978. A dramatic soprano who excelled in the Czech repertoire, she garnered particular acclaim for her portrayal of the title heroine in Bedřich Smetana's Libuše. Her physical beauty and dramatic talents further added to her great popularity among Czech audiences.

== Biography ==
Podvalová was born in Prague-Čakovice. In her early childhood, she moved with her parents to a house in Chrást, which she visited until her death.

Podvalová first studied the violin before studying singing voice privately in Prague. She entered the Prague Conservatory where she studied voice with A. Fatissová and Doubravka Brambergová. She made her professional opera debut in 1935 at the Mahen Theatre in Brno as Marina in Modest Mussorgsky's Boris Godunov.

Under the recommendation of conductor Václav Talich, Podvalová was made a principal artist at the Prague National Theater in 1936. She was the theatre's leading dramatic soprano for the next 38 years. Among her signature roles at the opera house were Emilia Marty in Leoš Janáček's The Makropulos Affair, the Foreign Princess in Antonín Dvořák's Rusalka, Kostelnička Buryjovka in Janáček's Jenůfa, Leonora in Fidelio, Milada in Smetana's Dalibor, Senta in Richard Wagner's The Flying Dutchman, and the title roles in Giacomo Puccini's Tosca and Smetana's Libuše. In 1938 she created The Fortune Teller in the world premiere of Bohuslav Martinů's Julietta. In 1959 she toured the Soviet Union with the Prague National Theatre.

Podvalová received numerous honors during her career. She made numerous recordings during her career, mostly on the Supraphon label. She died at the age of 82 in Prague.
