= Glyndebourne (record label) =

UK-based record label

The Glyndebourne CD Label
- Glyndebourne logo
- Founded: 2008
- Distributors: Select Music and Video Distribution (UK); Naxos America (North America); Naxos Sweden (Scandinavia); Codaex (rest of the world)
- Genre: Opera
- Location: United Kingdom
- Official website: glyndebourne.com

The Glyndebourne Label is a UK-based record label founded in 2006 to release live recordings of Glyndebourne Festival Opera performances.

Releases on The Glyndebourne Label draw on archival recordings from 1960 to the present day and are released in pairs with one recording from the original opera house and one from the new opera house on the same site which opened in 1994. The label released its first two recordings, Betrothal in a Monastery and Le nozze di Figaro, in 2008.

Since the establishment of the label in 2008, the releases on The Glyndebourne Label draw on the extensive recordings in the archive, which span the years from 1960 to the present day. The recordings were originally made for posterity by the late John Barnes. These recordings are released in pairs, with one recording from the old opera house and one from the new, which opened in 1994. All releases on the Glyndebourne Label are from live performances, resulting in vividly realistic recordings. They are packaged as a hard bound book containing a libretto in English, French and German along with a feature article and a synopsis.

== Releases ==
- I puritani, Bellini, (1960)
- Le nozze di Figaro, Mozart (1962)
- L'elisir d'amore, Donizetti (1962)
- Pelléas et Mélisande, Debussy (1963)
- Idomeneo, Mozart (1964)
- Peter Grimes, Britten (2000)
- Fidelio, Beethoven (2006)
- Betrothal in a Monastery, Prokofiev (2006)
- Rusalka, Dvořák (2009)
