= Tišice =

- Municipality
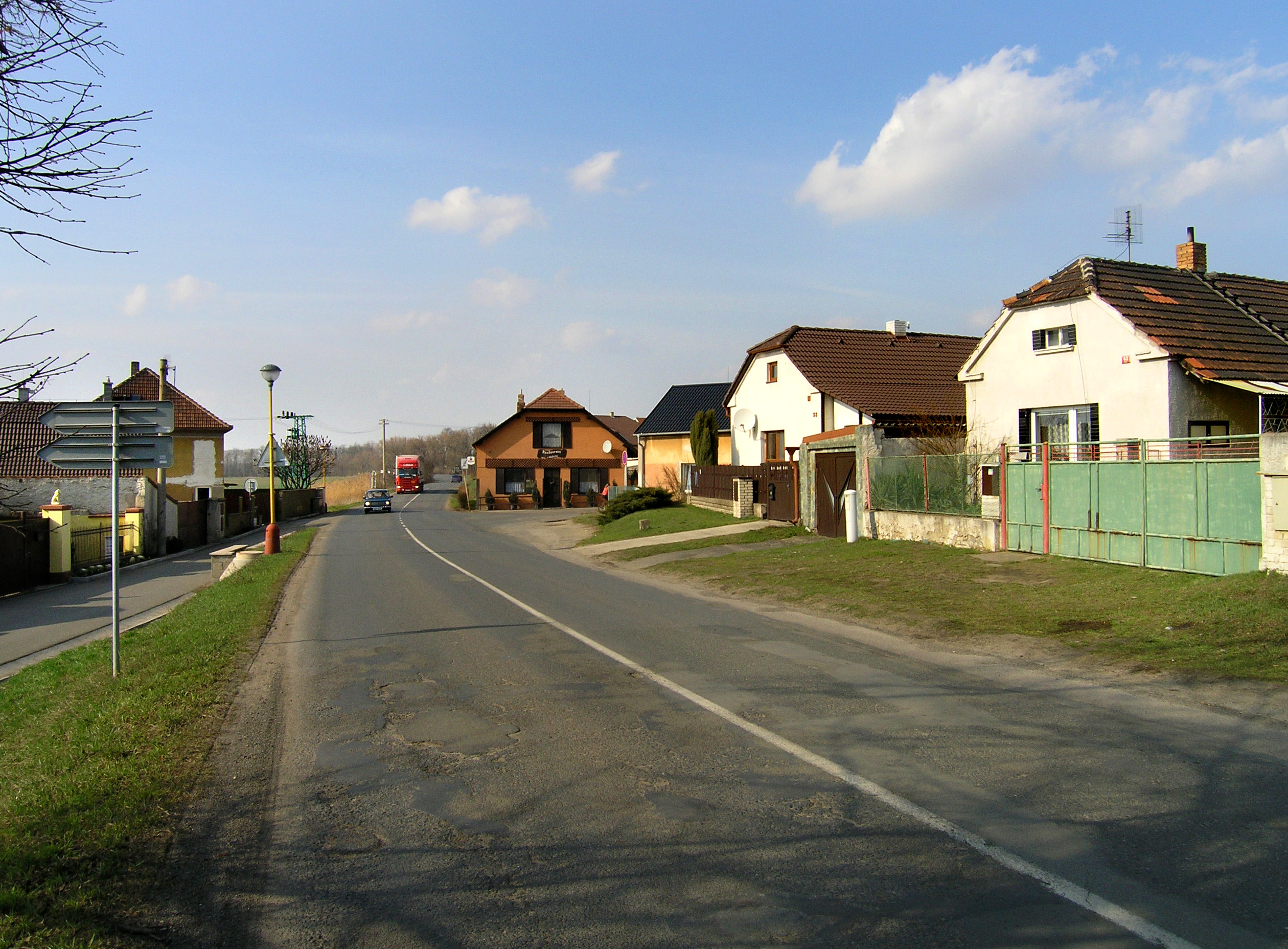
- Main road

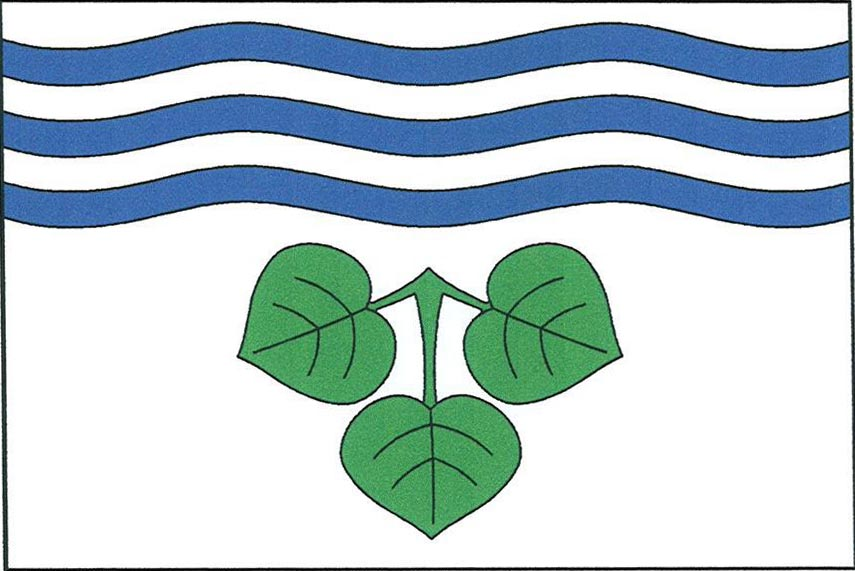
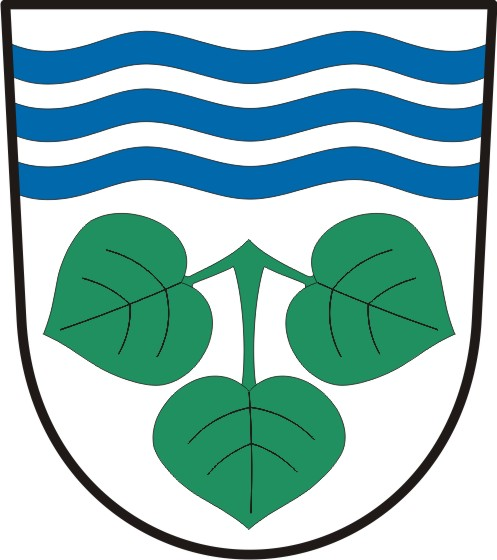
- Flag Coat of arms

- Location in the Czech Republic
- Coordinates: 50°16′12″N 14°33′15″E
- Country: Czech Republic
- Region: Central Bohemian
- District: Mělník
- First mentioned: 1400

Area
  - Total: 12.72 km^{2} (4.91 sq mi)
- Elevation: 167 m (548 ft)

Population (2026-01-01)
  - Total: 2,636
  - Density: 207.2/km^{2} (536.7/sq mi)
- Time zone: UTC+1 (CET)
  - Summer (DST): UTC+2 (CEST)
- Postal code: 277 15
- Website: www.tisice.cz

Tišice is a municipality and village in Mělník District in the Central Bohemian Region of the Czech Republic. It has about 2,600 inhabitants.

== Administrative division ==
Tišice consists of three municipal parts (in brackets population according to the 2021 census):

- Tišice (660)
- Chrást (1,168)
- Kozly (702)

== Etymology ==
The name is derived from the personal name Ticha, meaning "Ticha's (court)".

== Geography ==
Tišice is located about 18 kilometres (11 mi) north of Prague. It lies in a flat landscape in the Central Elbe Table. The Elbe River flows along the municipal border. The stream Košátecký potok flows through the northern part of the municipality.

== History ==
The first written mention of Tišice is from 1400. The village of Kozly was first mentioned in 1052 and Chrást in 1380. All three were separate municipalities until 1960, when they merged.

== Demographics ==
Historical population

Year	Pop.	±%
1869	936	—
1880	1,074	+14.7%
1890	1,039	−3.3%
1900	1,125	+8.3%
1910	1,388	+23.4%

Year	Pop.	±%
1921	1,434	+3.3%
1930	1,704	+18.8%
1950	1,868	+9.6%
1961	1,828	−2.1%
1970	1,727	−5.5%

Year	Pop.	±%
1980	1,574	−8.9%
1991	1,346	−14.5%
2001	1,372	+1.9%
2011	2,012	+46.6%
2021	2,530	+25.7%

Source: Censuses

== Transport ==
Tišice is located on the railway lines Prague–Turnov and Prague–Mělník.

== Sights ==
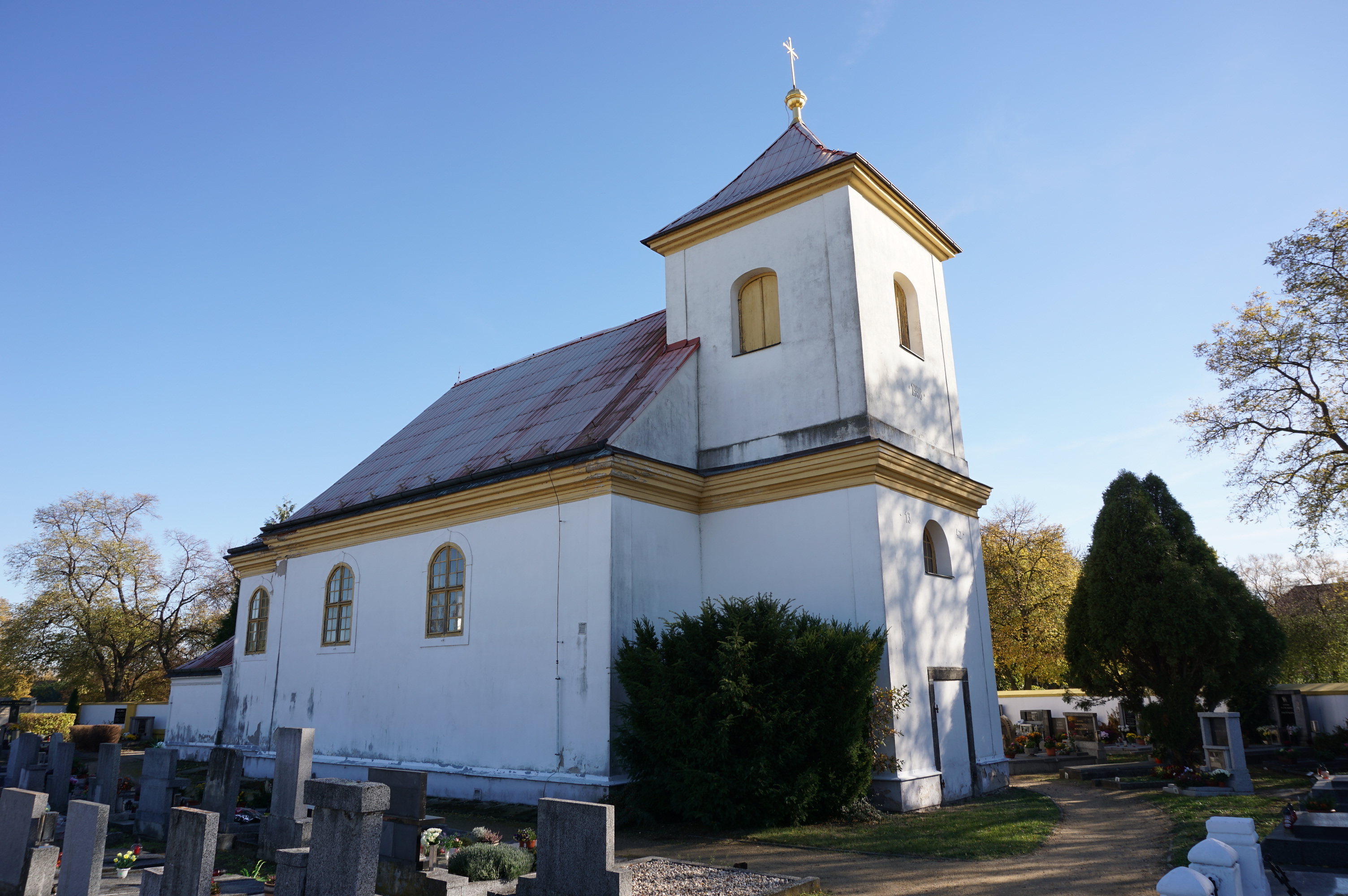
Church of All Saints

The most important monument is the Church of All Saints, located in Kozly. The originally early Gothic church was built in 1352. It was reconstructed in the Baroque style in 1822.

== Notable people ==
- Marie Podvalová (1909–1992), opera singer; grew up here
