= Francesco Meli =

Italian opera singer

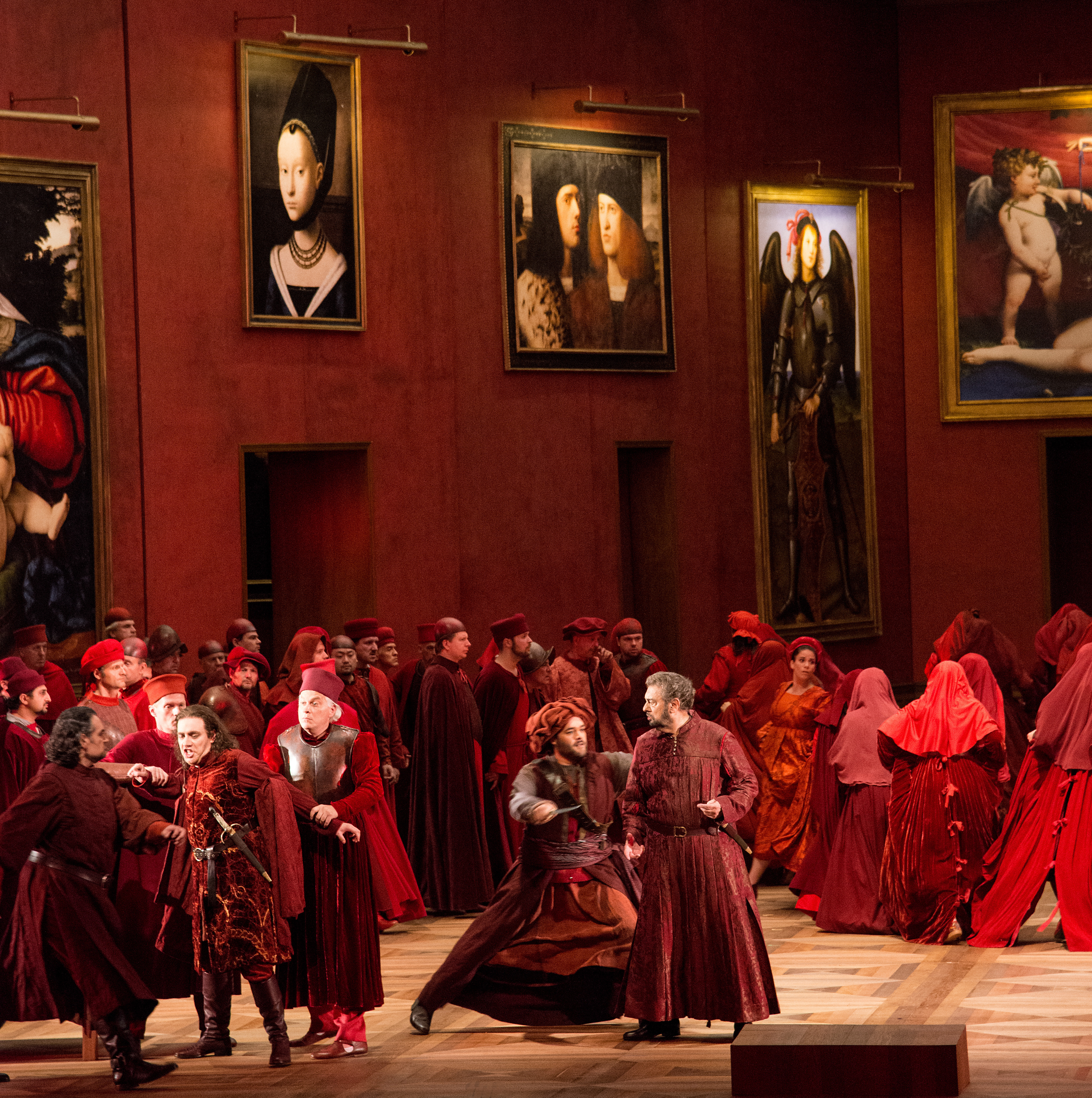
Francesco Meli and Plácido Domingo in Il trovatore, Salzburg Festival 2014

Francesco Meli (born 15 May 1980) is an Italian operatic tenor particularly associated with the romantic repertoire.

== Life and career ==
Born in Genoa, Meli began his vocal studies at age 17 with Norma Palacios at the Conservatorio di Musica "Niccolò Paganini" in Genoa. He later became a pupil of mezzo-soprano Franca Mattiucci. In 2002 he debuted in Verdi's Macbeth and as the tenor soloist in Rossini's Petite messe solennelle and Puccini's Messa di Gloria, broadcast by RAI (the Italian state broadcasting company) from the Festival dei Due Mondi in Spoleto. He has gone on to sing leading roles in La Scala, The Metropolitan Opera, Teatro Regio di Torino, London's Royal Opera House, Opéra National de Lyon, Opernhaus Zürich, and the Rossini Opera Festival in Pesaro. In 2017, he made his debut as Verdi's Don Carlo at La Scala and as Radames in Salzburg next to Anna Netrebko's Aida.

== Recordings ==
- Donizetti: Pia de' Tolomei - Cast: Patrizia Ciofi, Laura Polverelli, Dario Schmunck, Andrew Schroeder, Francesco Meli, Daniel Borowski. Conductor: Paolo Arrivabeni. CD recorded live from Teatro La Fenice, April 2004. Label: Dynamic
- Rossini: Bianca e Falliero - Cast: Maria Bayo, Daniela Barcellona, Francesco Meli, Carlo Lepore. Conductor: Renato Palumbo. DVD and CD recorded live from Teatro Rossini Pesaro, August 2005. Label: Dynamic
- Rossini: Torvaldo e Dorliska - Cast: Michele Pertusi, Darina Takova, Francesco Meli, Bruno Pratico. Conductor: Victor Pablo Perez. DVD and CD recorded love from Teatro Rossini Pesaro, August 2006. Label: Dynamic
- Bellini: La sonnambula - Cast: Natalie Dessay, Francesco Meli, Carlo Colombara, Sara Mingardo. Conductor: Evelino Pido. CD recorded live from performances with the Opéra National de Lyon in Lyon and Paris, November 2006. Label: Virgin Classics
- Donizetti: Maria Stuarda - Cast: Anna Caterina Antonacci, Mariella Devia, Francesco Meli, Paola Gardina. Conductor: Antonino Fogliani. DVD recorded live from Teatro alla Scala, 2008. Label: Arthaus Musik.
- Verdi: Giovanna d'Arco - Cast: Anna Netrebko, Plácido Domingo, Francesco Meli. Conductor: Paolo Carignani. CD recorded live at the Salzburg Festival in 2013. Label: Deutsche Grammophon.
