= Larissa Diadkova =

Russian singer

Larissa Ivanovna Diadkova (Russian: Лариса Ивановна Дядькова; born 1954 in Zelenodolsk) is a Russian mezzo-soprano.

== Career ==
For her musical education, she studied at Kazan Conservatory before moving on to the Saint Petersburg Conservatory. In 1978, she became a member of the Kirov Opera where she initially sang small roles. As a member of the Kirov Opera, Diadkova toured internationally under company director Valery Gergiev. She made her Metropolitan Opera debut in 1996 as Madelon in Andrea Chénier and performed the role of Marfa in Khovanshchina at La Scala in 1998. She also appeared in four Metropolitan productions in 1998: Prince Igor, Ruslan and Lyudmila, Mazeppa and Betrothal in a Monastery. Her other notable roles include Ježibaba in a 2002 modernization of Rusalka and Azucena opposite Roberto Alagna.

== Personal life ==
Diadkova lives in Luxembourg with her husband, a former singer with the Mariinsky Theatre, and their daughter.

== Selected discography ==
- Dvorak: Rusalka / Conlon (DVD)
- Glinka: Ruslan And Lyudmila / Gergiev, Kirov Opera
- Prokofiev: Betrothal In A Monastery / Gergiev
- Prokofiev: Love For Three Oranges / Gergiev
- Rimsky-Korsakov: Kashchey the Immortal / Gergiev
- Nicolai Rimsky-Korsakov: Sadko, 14 February 1995, conducted by Valery Gergiev, live performance
- Rimsky-korsakov: The Legend Of The Invisible City Of Kitezh / Gergiev
- Shostakovich: Orchestral Songs Vol 1 / Järvi
- Tchaikovsky, Mazeppa, 14 April 1998, conducted by Valery Gergiev, live performance
- Tchaikovsky: Mazeppa / Järvi
- Tchaikovsky: Pique Dame / Jansons
- Verdi: Falstaff / Abbado
- Verdi: Il Trovatore / Pappano
