= Dlažov =

- Municipality
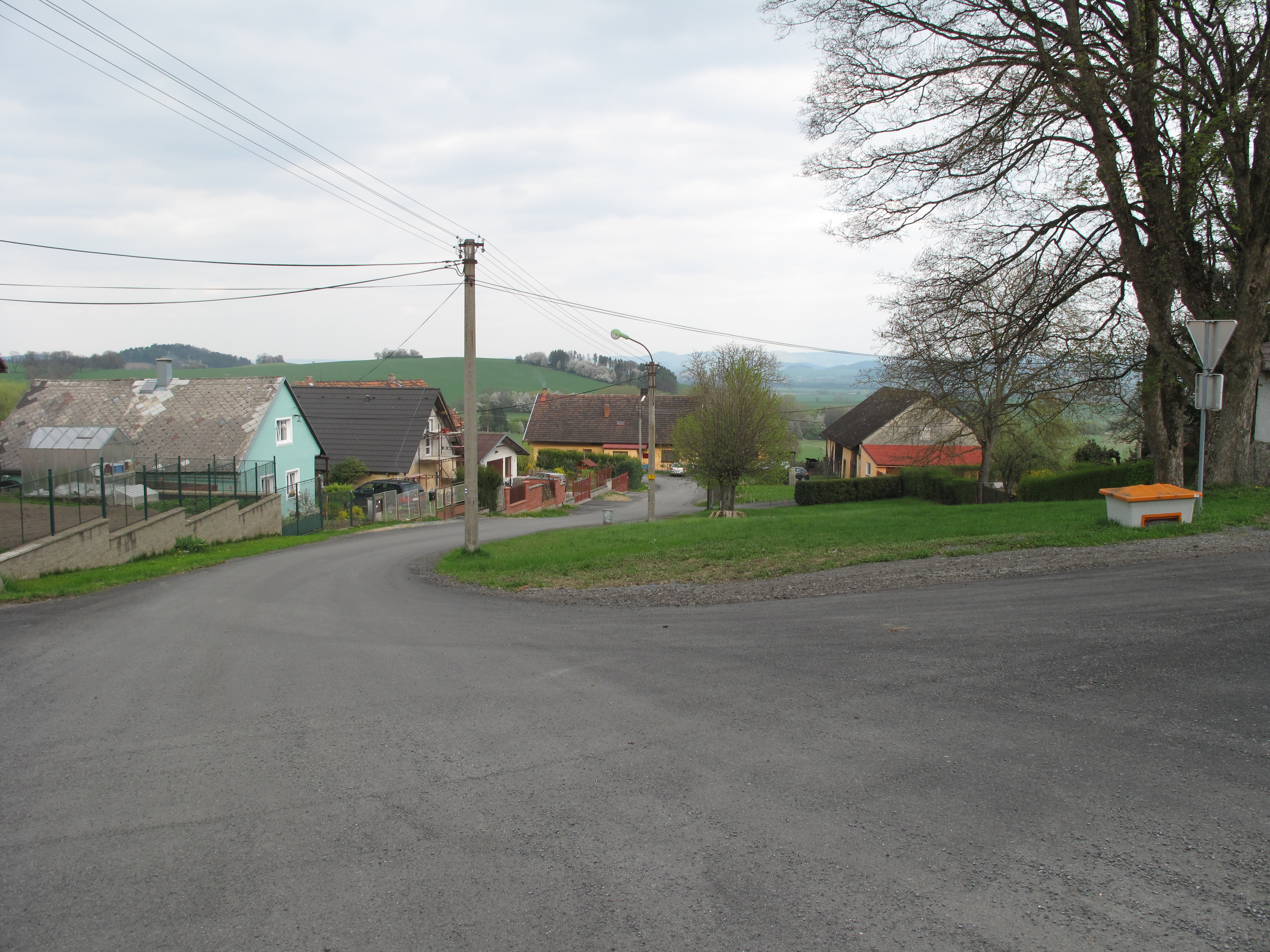
- Centre of Dlažov

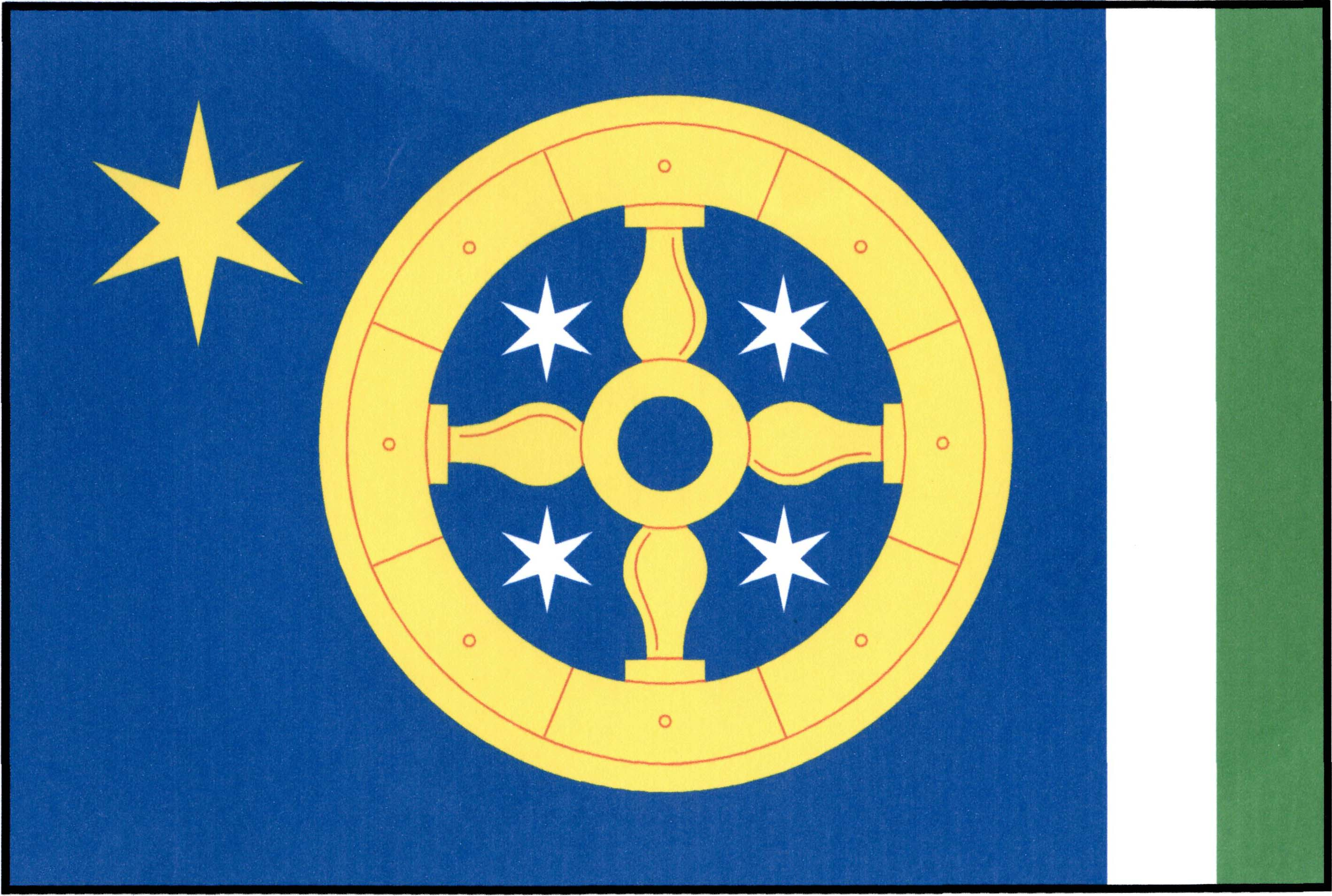
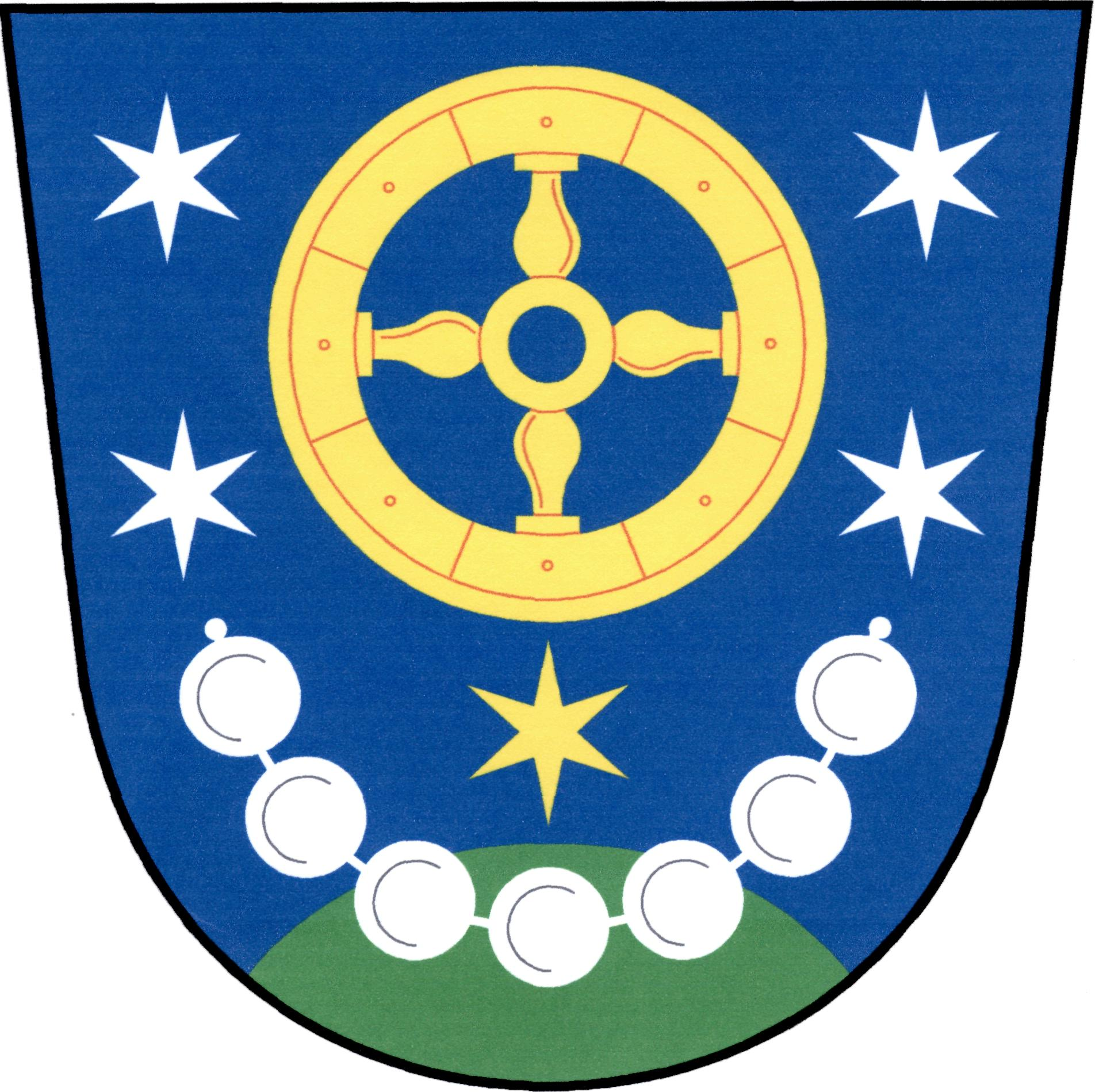
- Flag Coat of arms

- Location in the Czech Republic
- Coordinates: 49°21′57″N 13°9′59″E
- Country: Czech Republic
- Region: Plzeň
- District: Klatovy
- First mentioned: 1379

Area
  - Total: 12.26 km^{2} (4.73 sq mi)
- Elevation: 510 m (1,670 ft)

Population (2026-01-01)
  - Total: 488
  - Density: 39.8/km^{2} (103/sq mi)
- Time zone: UTC+1 (CET)
  - Summer (DST): UTC+2 (CEST)
- Postal codes: 339 01, 340 21
- Website: www.dlazov.cz

Dlažov (German: Glosau) is a municipality and village in Klatovy District in the Plzeň Region of the Czech Republic. It has about 500 inhabitants.

Dlažov lies approximately 10 kilometres (6 mi) west of Klatovy, 45 km (28 mi) south of Plzeň, and 121 km (75 mi) south-west of Prague.

== Administrative division ==
Dlažov consists of six municipal parts (in brackets population according to the 2021 census):

- Dlažov (163)
- Buková (43)
- Miletice (70)
- Nová Víska (45)
- Soustov (131)
- Vráž (4)

== Demographics ==
Historical population
Year	Pop.	±%
1869	1,426	—
1880	1,408	−1.3%
1890	1,220	−13.4%
1900	1,083	−11.2%
1910	1,114	+2.9%
1921	1,163	+4.4%
1930	1,032	−11.3%
1950	664	−35.7%
1961	656	−1.2%
1970	544	−17.1%
1980	491	−9.7%
1991	432	−12.0%
2001	414	−4.2%
2011	430	+3.9%
2021	456	+6.0%
Source: Censuses
