= Erwin Schrott =

Uruguayan opera singer

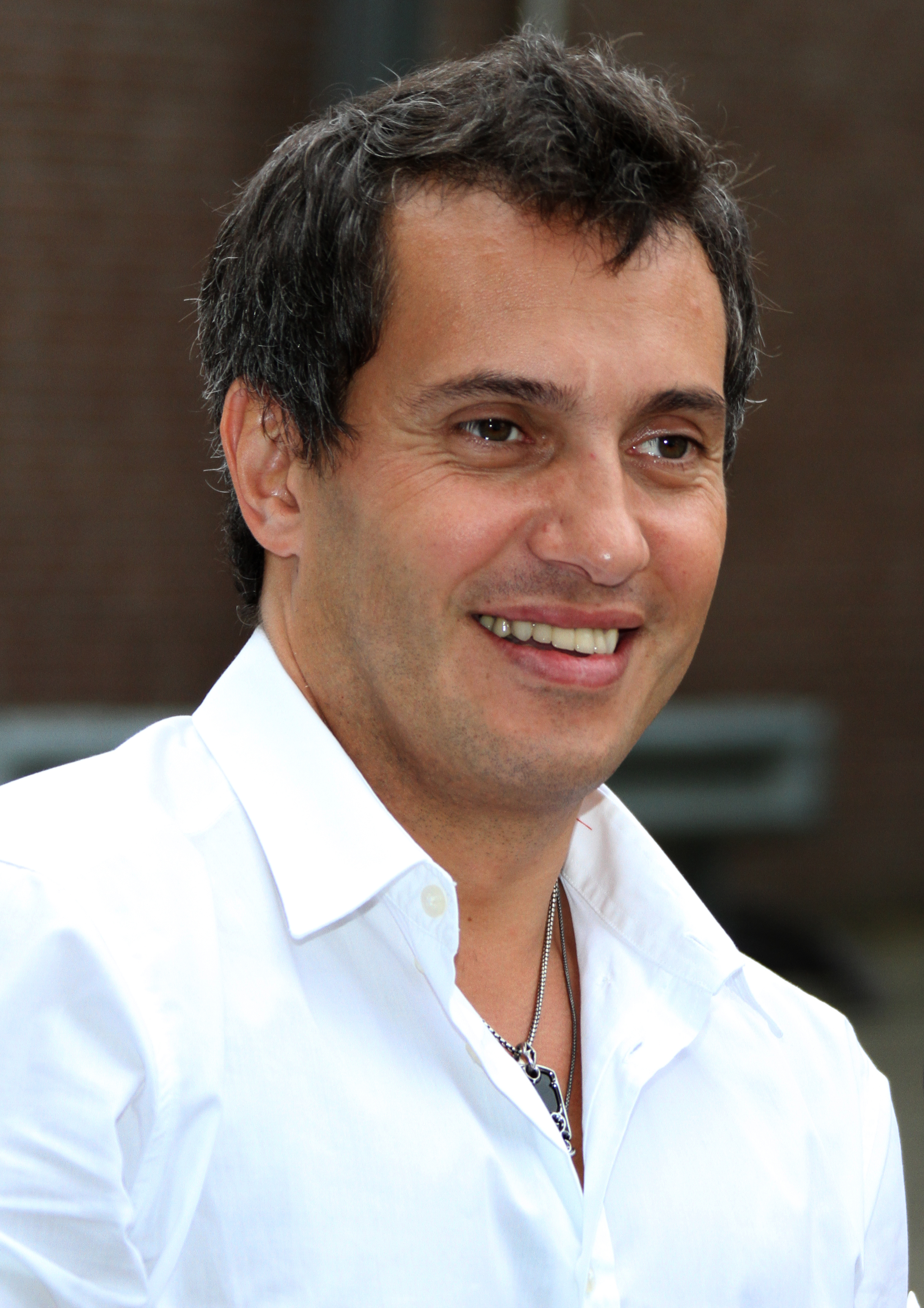
- Erwin Schrott, 2012
- Born: 21 December 1972 (age 53); Montevideo, Uruguay
- Occupation: Opera singer (bass-baritone)
- Years active: 1994–present
- Spouse: Niyousha Nasri
- Partner: Anna Netrebko (2008–2013)
- Children: 2
- Website: erwinschrott.com

Erwin Schrott (born 21 December 1972) is an Uruguayan operatic bass-baritone, particularly known for the title role of Mozart's Don Giovanni.

== Career ==
Schrott studied singing with Franca Mattiucci. He made his professional debut in Montevideo at the age of 22, singing Roucher in Andrea Chénier. Following a stint at the Teatro Municipal in Santiago, Chile, where he sang Timur in Turandot, Colline in La bohème, Sparafucile in Rigoletto and Ramfis in Aida, he won a scholarship to study in Italy.

After winning first prize (male singer) and the Audience Prize in the 1998 Operalia competition founded by Plácido Domingo, he went on to leading roles in major opera houses in both Europe and the United States. He made his debut at the Vienna State Opera as Banquo in Verdi's Macbeth on 28 March 1999 and returned there to sing Leporello in Don Giovanni and Figaro in Le nozze di Figaro. At La Scala, he has sung the Title role in Don Giovanni and Pharaon in Moïse et Pharaon. His debut at the New York Metropolitan Opera came on 30 November 2000 when he sang Colline in La bohème. He returned to the company in 2005 as Escamillo in Carmen, in 2006 in the Title role in Don Giovanni for the Met's Japan Tour, in 2007 as Figaro in Le nozze di Figaro and in 2008 in the Title role in Don Giovanni. Since his debut at the Royal Opera House in September 2003 as Leporello in Don Giovanni, Schrott has sung Figaro in Le nozze di Figaro, and the Title role in Don Giovanni with the company. He sang the role of Escamillo (7 December 2009) in the production of Carmen conducted by Daniel Barenboim, with Jonas Kaufmann as Don Josè and Anita Rachvelishvili in the Title role, that opened the season at La Scala.

Schrott's performances on the concert stage include a joint concert with Anna Netrebko conducted by Plácido Domingo in the Centro de Bellas Artes, San Juan, Puerto Rico (9 October 2007), a gala concert for the 5th Abu Dhabi Music and Arts Festival, with Anna Netrebko and Elīna Garanča (29 March 2008), and a solo concert in the Münchner Residenz (9 November 2008).

In April 2008, concert promoter Ian Rosenblatt said that he was planning to sue Schrott for breach of contract when he cancelled his appearance in the Rosenblatt Recital Series for 11 June 2008 at Cadogan Hall. The dispute was settled out of court in August 2008 when Schrott agreed to make a donation to charity.

== Personal life ==
Schrott was married in Uruguay and has a daughter, born in 1998. After the divorce, his wife and daughter stayed in Uruguay. He was for six years the partner of the Russian soprano Anna Netrebko. They never married, and in November 2013, Netrebko announced that she and Schrott had separated amicably. Their son, Tiago Aruã, was born on 5 September 2008 in Vienna. In addition to joint concerts in Puerto Rico, Abu Dhabi and Riga, Netrebko and Schrott appeared together in Don Giovanni with the New York Metropolitan Opera's Japan Tour in June 2006 and at the Royal Opera House in June 2007.

Schrott is now married to Niyousha Nasri.

== Awards and honors ==
- 2018: Excelentia a la Cultura Prize 2018, La Fundación Excelencia – Spain
- 2017: XXX International "Luigi Illica Prize" – Premio Illica, Italy
- 2017: Goldenes Ehrenzeichen für Verdienste um die Republik Österreich – Grand golden medal of honor for services to the republic of Austria
- 2015: "Distinguished Citizen" from Montevideo
- 2012: Echo Klassik Award for his album Rojotango
- 1998: First prize (male singer) and Audience prize Operalia competition founded by Plácido Domingo

== Repertoire ==
- Bellini: Sir Giorgio and Riccardo Forth in I puritani
- Bellini: Rodolfo in La sonnambula
- Berlioz: Mephistopheles in La damnation de Faust
- Berlioz: Narbal in Les Troyens
- Bizet: Escamillo in Carmen
- Boito: Title role in Mefistofele
- Donizetti: Dulcamara in L’elisir d’amore
- Donizetti: Enrico VIII. in Anna Bolena
- Donizetti: Don Alfonso in Lucrezia Borgia
- Donizetti: Title role in Don Pasquale
- Gounod: Mephistopheles in Faust
- Mozart: Title role and Count Almaviva in Le nozze di Figaro
- Mozart: Title role and Leporello in Don Giovanni
- Offenbach: Lindorf/Coppélius/Miracle in The Tales of Hoffmann
- Ponchielli: Alvise Badoero in La Gioconda
- Puccini: Scarpia in Tosca
- Puccini: Colline in La bohème
- Puccini: Timur in Turandot
- Rossini: Alidoro in La Cenerentola
- Rossini: Pharaon in Moïse et Pharaon
- Rossini: Selim in Il turco in Italia
- Rossini: Lindoro in L’italiana in Algeri
- Verdi: Banco in Macbeth
- Verdi: Ramfis in Aida
- Verdi: Procida in Les vêpres siciliennes
- Verdi: Title role in Attila
- Verdi: Pagano in I Lombardi alla prima crociata

== Recordings ==
- Les vêpres siciliennes (Verdi) Royal Opera House, London, Production 2013/Release 2015, Antonio Pappano conducting. Warner Music Group, DVD & Blu-ray
- Don Giovanni (Mozart) Festspielhaus Baden-Baden, 2013, Thomas Hengelbrock conducting. Sony Classical, DVD & Blu-ray
- Rojotango – Live in Berlin, 2013, Sony Classical, DVD
- Arias – Erwin Schrott, 2012, Daniele Rustioni conducting. Sony Classical, CD
- Rojotango – Erwin Schrott, Tango CD, 2011, with Pablo Ziegler. Sony Classical, CD
- Don Giovanni (Mozart) Salzburg Festival recorded in 2008, 2010, Bertrand de Billy conducting. Naxos Germany, DVD
- Le nozze di Figaro (Mozart) Opernhaus Zürich, 2009, Franz Welser-Möst conducting. EMI Music, DVD
- Arias by Mozart, Verdi, Berlioz, Gounod & Meyerbeer, 2008, Orquestra de la Comunitat Valenciana, Riccardo Frizza conducting. Decca CD
- Le nozze di Figaro (Mozart) Royal Opera House, 2008, Antonio Pappano conducting. Opus Arte, DVD & Blu-ray
- Moïse et Pharaon (Pharaon), Teatro alla Scala, 2003, Riccardo Muti conducting. TDK DVD
- L'elisir d'amore (Dulcamara), Macerata Opera Festival, 2002, Niels Muus conducting. Rai Trade DVD and CD
