= Fiorenza Cedolins =

Italian soprano (born 1966)

Fiorenza Cedolins (born 18 March 1966) is an Italian soprano.

== Biography ==
Cedolins made her operatic debut in 1992 at the Teatro Carlo Felice in Genoa in Mascagni's Cavalleria rusticana. She then became an artist-in-residence at the Split Summer Festival, and appeared in various roles, with a repertoire that ranged from Monteverdi's Il combattimento di Tancredi e Clorinda to Orff’s Carmina burana, and from Rossini's Mosè in Egitto to Strauss's Salome. In 1996 she won the Luciano Pavarotti Vocal Competition, and was invited to sing Puccini ’s Tosca with the Opera Company of Philadelphia with Pavarotti. In the same year she sang the role of Santuzza in Cavalleria rusticana at the Ravenna Festival, conducted by Riccardo Muti. In 2005 she performed Verdi's Requiem at the Auditorium of Santa Cecilia in Rome, conducted by Zubin Mehta; at the requiem mass for Pope John Paul II; and on tour in Frankfurt and Vienna with the Orchestra Sinfonica di Milan, conducted by Riccardo Chailly. She also sang Bellini’s Norma at the Teatro Carlo Felice in Genoa, conducted by Bruno Campanella; and Mimi in Puccini's La bohème and the title-role in Tosca at the Verona Arena, conducted by Daniel Oren.

Cedolins has also sung the title roles in Cilea's Adriana Lecouvreur, Verdi's Aida and Luisa Miller, Puccini's Manon Lescaut, Madama Butterfly and Suor Angelica. Other roles include Leonora in Verdi's Il trovatore, Amalia in Verdi's I masnadieri, Desdemona in Otello, Elisabetta di Valois in Don Carlos.
