= Vráž (Beroun District) =

- Municipality
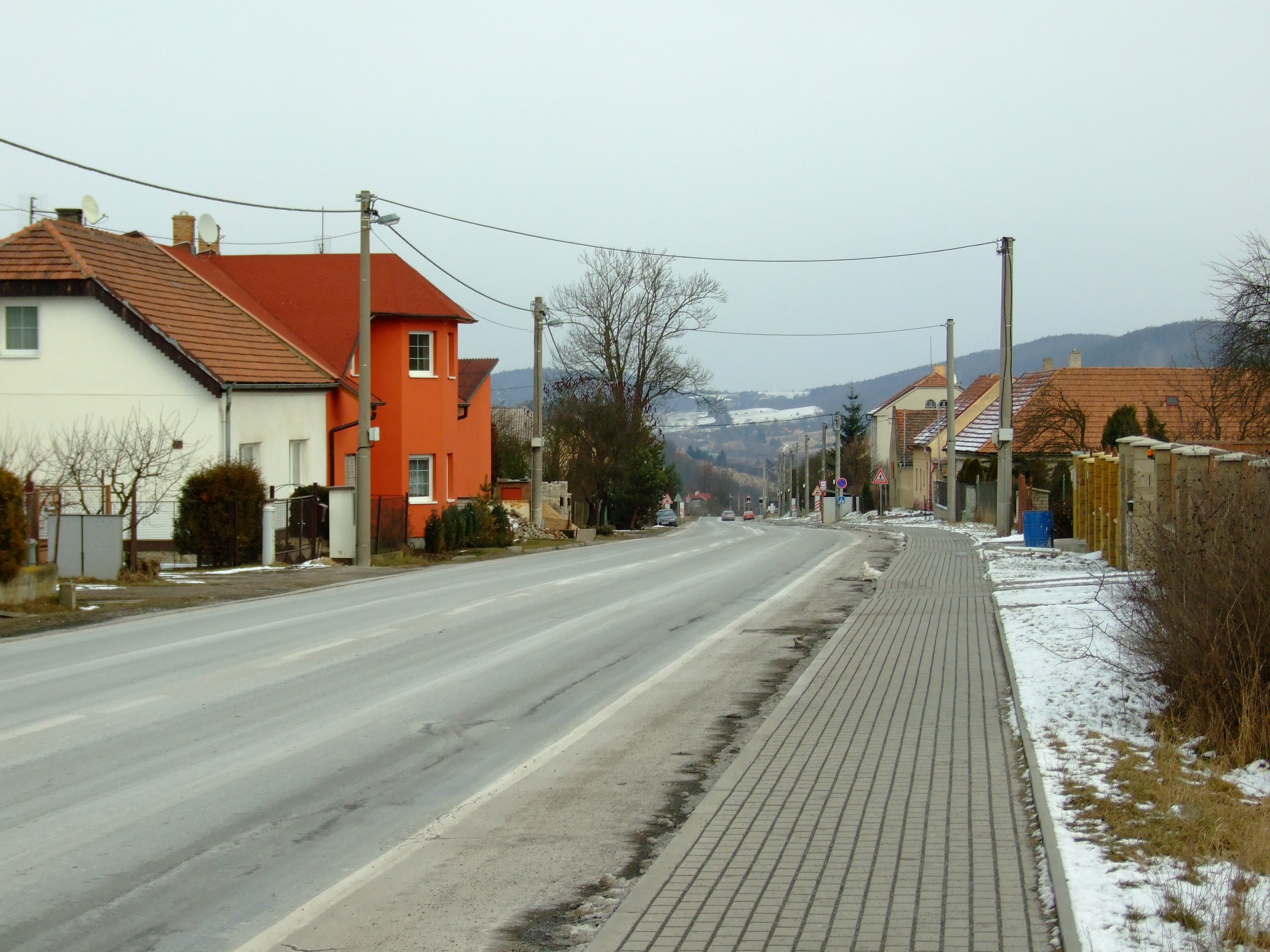
- Main street

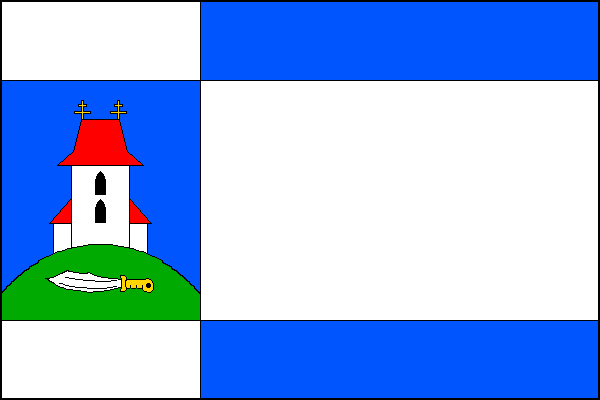
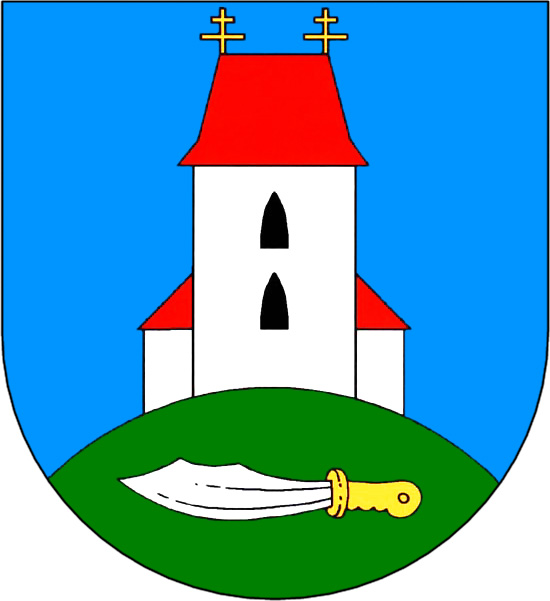
- Flag Coat of arms

- Location in the Czech Republic
- Coordinates: 49°59′0″N 14°7′44″E
- Country: Czech Republic
- Region: Central Bohemian
- District: Beroun
- First mentioned: 1320

Area
  - Total: 6.32 km^{2} (2.44 sq mi)
- Elevation: 222 m (728 ft)

Population (2026-01-01)
  - Total: 1,265
  - Density: 200/km^{2} (518/sq mi)
- Time zone: UTC+1 (CET)
  - Summer (DST): UTC+2 (CEST)
- Postal code: 267 11
- Website: www.obec-vraz.cz

Vráž is a municipality and village in Beroun District in the Central Bohemian Region of the Czech Republic. It has about 1,300 inhabitants.

== Etymology ==
The origin of the name Vráž is uncertain and several hypotheses have emerged. The most likely interpretation is that the name was derived from the Slavic word ovrag, meaning 'depression', 'gorge'.

== Geography ==
Vráž is located about 4 kilometres (2 mi) northeast of Beroun and 17 km (11 mi) southwest of Prague. It lies mostly in the Hořovice Uplands, only the southern part of the municipal territory extends into the Křivoklát Highlands. The highest point is at 435 m (1,427 ft) above sea level.

== History ==
The first written mention of Vráž is from 1320. From 1357 at the latest, the village was part of the Karlštejn estate and shared its owners and destiny. In 1421, Vráž suffered from the Hussite Wars. In 1639, during the Thirty Years' War, Vráž was burned down by the Swedish army and only few inhabitants remained, but the village recovered.

== Demographics ==
Historical population

Year	Pop.	±%
1869	455	—
1880	544	+19.6%
1890	602	+10.7%
1900	761	+26.4%
1910	837	+10.0%

Year	Pop.	±%
1921	889	+6.2%
1930	1,015	+14.2%
1950	1,002	−1.3%
1961	1,029	+2.7%
1970	941	−8.6%

Year	Pop.	±%
1980	829	−11.9%
1991	768	−7.4%
2001	861	+12.1%
2011	1,047	+21.6%
2021	1,235	+18.0%

Source: Censuses

== Transport ==
The D5 motorway from Prague to Plzeň runs through the municipality.

== Sights ==
The main landmark of Vráž is the Church of Saint Bartholomew. It is a Gothic church from the first half of the 14th century, modified in 1909–1910.
