= Betrothal in a Monastery =

Opera by Sergei Prokofiev

- Opera by Sergei Prokofiev
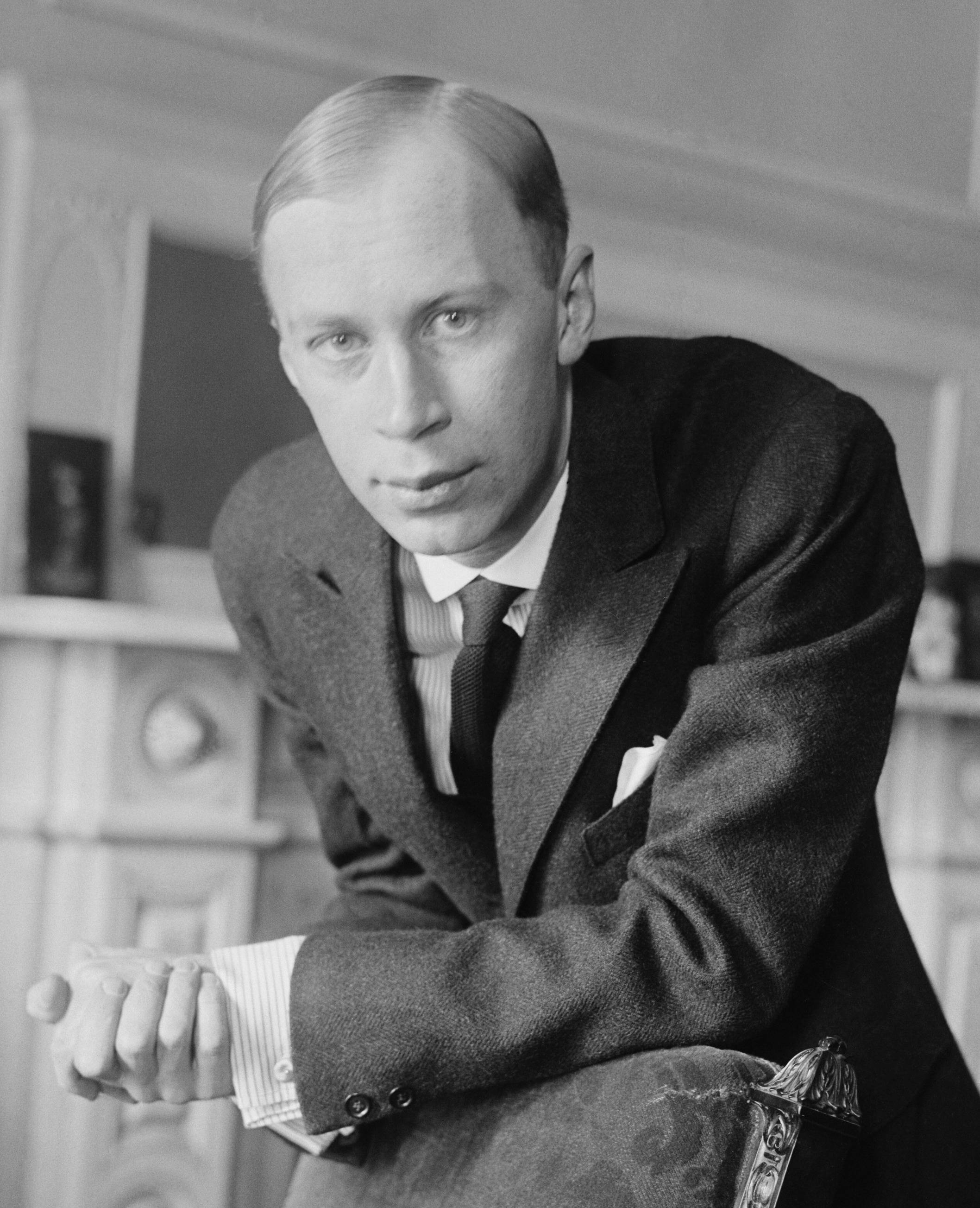
- The composer in 1918
- Native title: Обручение в монастыре; Obrucheniye v monastïre)
- Librettist: Prokofiev; Mira Mendelson
- Language: Russian
- Based on: Richard Brinsley Sheridan's ballad opera libretto
- Premiere: 3 November 1946; Kirov Theatre, Saint Petersburg

Betrothal in a Monastery (Russian title Обручение в монастыре) is an opera in nine scenes (four acts) by Sergei Prokofiev to a Russian libretto by the composer and Mira Mendelson after Sheridan's The Duenna.

Prokofiev began the work in 1940, and it was in rehearsal that year, but World War II halted production of the opera. The composer revised the score in Almaty in 1943. The first performance did not occur until 3 November 1946 at the Kirov Theatre with Boris Khaikin conducting. The producer was I. Shlepianov.

Commentators have noted that, given the context of its creation in the 1940s in the Soviet Union, this opera lacks any particular political or social comment, except perhaps for a scene involving drunken monks.

== Performance history ==
The opera was first performed in the United States (in English) in New York on June 1, 1948. The opera was first performed in the United Kingdom (in Russian) in London on May 5, 1963. In recent years, the opera has been performed in 1989 at the Wexford Festival, in 2006 at the Glyndebourne Festival and at the Palau de les Arts in Valencia, Spain in 2008, at Staatsoper Berlin, in 2019.

== Roles ==
Role	Voice type	Premiere cast 3 November 1946, Leningrad (Conductor: Boris Khaikin)
Don Zherom, or Jerome, a Seville grandee	tenor	V. Ulyanov
Luiza, or Louisa, his daughter	soprano	Alexandra Khalilejeva
Ferdinand, his son	baritone	
Duenya, or the Duenna, Luiza's governess	contralto	N. Velter
Clara d'Almanza, Luiza's friend, in love with Ferdinand	mezzo-soprano	
Antonio, humble suitor to Luiza	tenor	
Mendoza, a wealthy fishmonger	bass	Boris Freidkov
Don Carlos, friend to Mendoza	baritone	Gheorghij Nikolajevich Orlov
Padre Augustin	bass	
Father Elustaf	tenor	
Father Chartreuse	bass	
Father Benedictine	bass	
Lauretta	soprano	
Rosina	soprano	
Lopez	tenor	
Pablo		
Pedro		
Miguel		
Three Maskers		
Two Lay Brothers		

== Synopsis ==
=== Act 1 ===
Don Jerome intends his daughter Louisa to marry the vain, wealthy and ugly fish merchant Mendoza. However, she loves instead Antonio, who is poor, though noble in spirit. Furthermore, Don Ferdinand, son of Don Jerome and prone to fits of jealousy, wants to marry Clara d'Almanza, who is a virtual prisoner of her stepmother.

=== Act 2 ===
Don Jerome locks up Louisa in her room to force her to marry Mendoza. Louisa's nurse (the Duenna) provokes the fury of Don Jerome by pretending to be a messenger between Antonio and Louisa. Jerome dismisses her - but the Duenna exchanges clothes with Louisa who makes her escape in this disguise.

By the quayside - where fisherwomen are praising the quality of the fish caught in Mendoza's boats - Louisa encounters her friend Clara, who has also run away from home and intends to seek sanctuary at the nunnery. Louisa asks to borrow Clara's name for a day - Clara assents. Enter Mendoza and his courtly friend Don Carlos. Mendoza is recognized by Louisa but he has never seen her. She therefore approaches Mendoza claiming to be Clara and asks him to take her under his protection and find Antonio with whom she is in love. Mendoza is attracted by this idea as a means to rid himself of his rival Antonio by marrying him off to 'Clara'. Don Carlos escorts 'Clara' to Mendoza's house.

Mendoza visits the house of Don Jerome to meet 'Louisa' (the Duenna in disguise); whilst 'Louisa' is not as young and beautiful as Mendoza had been led to believe, her dowry is sufficient attraction. They agree to elope that evening.

=== Act 3 ===
The mystified Antonio arrives at Mendoza's house; while he is offstage meeting 'Clara', Mendoza and don Carlos congratulate themselves on their cunning. Still unwitting, they agree to help the pair get married.

Don Jerome is rehearsing some amateur musicians (a trio of trumpet, clarinet and bass drum). He receives two messages, one from Mendoza saying he has eloped with Louisa, which delights him, and another from the real Louisa who asks for his blessing for her marriage, which he neglects to read carefully. He sends back his consent with both messengers and arranges for a great feast later that evening to celebrate.

At the monastery, Clara meets with Antonio and Luisa and laments her apparent loss of Ferdinand. Enter Ferdinand, who mistaking Clara for a nun exclaims that he is chasing his false friend Antonio who has run off with his beloved Clara. Clara is secretly overjoyed at this demonstration of Ferdinand's passion.

=== Act 4 ===
The act opens with a drinking song for the monks in the monastery where the marriages are to be performed. The monks then switch to a hymn that extols fasting and abstinence, to a tune that is a slower variant of the earlier drinking song. Enter Mendoza and Antonio who by lavish bribery gain the monks consent to marry them to their loves. Enter Ferdinand who challenges Antonio to a duel, but the genuine Clara arrives and Ferdinand now understands the true situation. The three marriages are agreed.

At Don Jerome's feast, the host is increasingly amazed, exasperated and infuriated as the successive arrival of the newly-weds makes it clear that his plans have gone completely awry. He is slightly compensated by the likely size of Clara's dowry. He sings a drinking song, accompanying himself on a set of tuned glasses.

== Recordings ==
Recordings include:

- Stanislavsky Musical Theatre. With N. Korshunov (Don Jerome), Y. Kratov (Ferdinand), V. Kayevchenko (Louise), T. Yanko (Louise's Duenna), N. Issakova (Clara), E. Bulavin (Mendoza), S. Ilyinsky (Don Carlos), I. Petrov (Padre Augustin) cond. K. Abdullayev (Melodyia, 1963)
- Orchestra and chorus of the Bolshoi Theatre cond. Alexander Lazarev, (BMG Classics, 1990)
- Kirov Orchestra and Kirov Opera. With Evgeny Akimov, Marianna Tarassova, Anna Netrebko, Alexandr Gergalov, Nikolai Gassiev, Larissa Diadkova, Sergey Aleksashkin, Yury Shkliar. Chorus cond. Valery Gergiev (Philips, 1998)

== Summer Night ==
Summer Night (Op. 123) is an orchestral suite with music drawn from Betrothal in a Monastery.

=== Movements ===
The suite, lasting around 20 minutes, consists of five movements:

1. Introduction: Moderato, ma con brio
2. Serenade: Adagio
3. Minuet
4. Dreams (Nocturne): Andante tranquillo
5. Dance: Allegretto

=== Recordings ===
Recent recordings include:

- Tampere Philharmonic Orchestra conductor Leonid Grin (Ondine, 1991)
- London Philharmonic Orchestra conductor Vladimir Jurowski (Glyndebourne CD Label, 2008)
- Russian National Orchestra conductor Mikhail Pletnev (Deutsche Grammophon, 1994)
- St. Petersburg Philharmonic Orchestra conductor Vladimir Ashkenazy (Exton, 2002)
