= Elena Zaremba =

Russian-born mezzo-soprano long (born 1957)

Elena Zaremba (born July 10, 1957) is a Russian-born mezzo-soprano long active in the United States.

Zaremba was born in Moscow into a family of singers, and studied at the Gnessin State Musical College, joining the Bolshoi Opera in 1984 upon graduation. On the company's 1989 tour to La Scala she made her Western debut as Vanya in A Life for the Tsar. At this stage in her career she sang mainly Russian roles, such as Laura in The Stone Guest, the Innkeeper in Boris Godunov, Olga in Eugene Onegin, and Amelfa in The Golden Cockerel; other roles included Cherubino and Lola in Cavalleria rusticana. In 1990 Zaremba was engaged as Konchakovna for Prince Igor at the Royal Opera House, a performance which has been preserved on video. In 1991 she bowed in New York with the Bolshoi on tour; in 1992 she was Ulrica at the Vienna State Opera, and that same year she sang Carmen for Bregenz. In 1991 she took part in the world premiere of The Master and Margarita by Nicolas Slonimsky in Moscow. Zaremba has since moved to the West, and taken on roles such as Dalila. She has sung frequently with the Metropolitan Opera since her debut with the company as Azucena in 1999. Zaremba has recorded the role of Erda in Das Rheingold under Christoph von Dohnányi, and Ulrica in Un ballo in maschera under Carlo Rizzi, but the majority of her recordings are of Russian music.
