= Tosca discography =

This is a discography of Tosca, an opera by Giacomo Puccini. It premiered at the Teatro Costanzi in Rome on 14 January 1900. Tosca has been one of the most frequently recorded operas, dating back to a nearly complete acoustical recording in 1918.

== Audio ==
Year	Cast (Tosca, Cavaradossi, Scarpia)	Conductor, Opera house and orchestra	Label
1918	Lya Remondini, Carlo Broccardi, Dario Zani	Carlo Sabajno; Teatro alla Scala orchestra and chorus	78rpm: La voce del padrone Cat: S5584-S5606 (even numbered, 12 discs)
1919	Valentina Bartolomasi, Attilio Salvaneschi, Adolfo Pacini	Carlo Sabajno; Teatro alla Scala orchestra and chorus	(Recorded by His Master's Voice); 78 RPM: Società Nazionale del Grammofono; Cat: S5701- S5724 (16 discs)
1929	Carmen Melis, Piero Pauli, Apollo Granforte	Carlo Sabajno; Teatro alla Scala orchestra and chorus	(Recorded by His Master's Voice); CD: Arkadia; Cat: 78002
1929	Bianca Scacciati, Alessandro Granda, Enrico Molinari	Lorenzo Molajoli; Teatro alla Scala orchestra and chorus	78rpm: Columbia Records; Cat: D14594 – D14607 (14 discs); 33rpm LP: Columbia (UK); Cat: EL-4
1932	Ninon Vallin, Enrico Di Mazzei, Arthur Endrèze	Gustave Cloëz; Paris Opéra Comique orchestra and chorus, (Performed in French; abridged)	78 rpm: Odéon; Cat: 123.810-16 (7 discs)
1938	Maria Caniglia, Beniamino Gigli, Armando Borgioli	Oliviero De Fabritiis; Teatro dell'Opera di Roma orchestra and chorus	(Recorded by His Master's Voice); CD: Arkadia; Cat: 78025
1942	Grace Moore, Frederick Jagel, Sándor Svéd	Ettore Panizza; Metropolitan Opera orchestra and chorus (Recording of a performance on 7 February 1942)	CD: Bensar; Cat: OL 2742
1944	Grace Moore, Charles Kullman, Sándor Svéd	Cesare Sodero; Metropolitan Opera orchestra and chorus (Recording of a performance on 8 April 1944)	CD: Omega Opera Archive; Cat: 1219
1944	Hildegard Ranczak, Helge Rosvaenge, Georg Hann	Leopold Ludwig; Berlin Radio orchestra and chorus, (Performed in German)	CD: Preiser; Cat: 90210
1946	Grace Moore, Jan Peerce, Lawrence Tibbett	Cesare Sodero; Metropolitan Opera orchestra and chorus (Recording of a performance on 9 February 1946)	CD: Myto Records; Cat: MCD 942 98
1950	Maria Callas, Mario Filippeschi, Robert Weede	Umberto Mugnai; Palacio de Bellas Artes orchestra and chorus (Recording of a performance on 8 June 1950)	CD: Arkadia; Cat: GA 2047
1951	Simona Dall'Argine, Nino Scattolini, Scipio Colombo	Argeo Quadri; Vienna State Opera orchestra Vienna Chamber choir	(Recorded by Westminster); CD: Preiser Records; Cat: 20024
1951	Adriana Guerrini, Gianni Poggi, Paolo Silveri	Francesco Molinari-Pradelli; RAI orchestra and chorus	(Recorded by Cetra); CD: Warner Fonit; Cat: 5046 63305-2
1951	Vera Petrova, Eddy Ruhl, Piero Campolonghi	Emilio Tieri; Maggio Musicale Fiorentino orchestra and chorus	33rpm LP: Remington; Cat: 199-62
1952	Renata Tebaldi, Giuseppe Campora, Enzo Mascherini	Alberto Erede; Accademia Nazionale di Santa Cecilia orchestra and chorus	(Recorded by Decca); CD: Pearl; Cat: 199
1952	Maria Callas, Giuseppe Di Stefano, Piero Campolonghi	Guido Picco; Palacio de Bellas Artes orchestra and chorus (Recording of a performance on 1 July 1952)	CD: Archipel; Cat: OO49
1953	Maria Callas, Giuseppe Di Stefano, Tito Gobbi	Victor de Sabata; Teatro alla Scala orchestra and chorus Main article: Tosca (Sabata recording)	CD: EMI Classics; Cat: 562890
1953	Carla Martinis, Rudolf Schock, Josef Metternich	Wilhelm Schüchter; NDR Hamburg orchestra and chorus (Performed in German)	CD: Relief; Cat: CR 1905
1955	Gigliola Frazzoni, Ferruccio Tagliavini, Giangiacomo Guelfi	Arturo Basile; Orchestra sinfonica di Torino della RAI	CD: Warner Fonit; Cat: 8573 87479-2
1956	Renata Tebaldi, Richard Tucker, Leonard Warren	Dimitri Mitropoulos; Metropolitan Opera orchestra and chorus (Recording of a performance on 7 January 1956)	CD: Andromeda; Cat: ANDRCD 9001
1957	Licia Albanese, Daniele Barioni, Leonard Warren	Dimitri Mitropoulos; Metropolitan Opera orchestra and chorus (Recording of a performance on 23 March 1957)	CD: Walhall; Cat: WLCD0328
1957	Dorothy Kirsten, Daniele Barioni, Frank Guarrera	Dimitri Mitropoulos; Metropolitan Opera orchestra and chorus (abridged)	(Recorded by Metropolitan Opera Record Club); CD: Premiere Opera Ltd. Cat: CDNO 446-2 (1 CD)
1957	Zinka Milanov, Jussi Björling, Leonard Warren	Erich Leinsdorf; Teatro dell'Opera di Roma orchestra and chorus	CD: RCA Victor; Cat: 09026-63305-2
1957	Zinka Milanov, Franco Corelli, Giangiacomo Guelfi	Alexander Gibson; Royal Opera House orchestra and chorus (Recording of a performance on 1 July 1957)	CD: Royal Opera House Heritage Series; Cat: ROH S 5
1957	Antonietta Stella, Gianni Poggi, Giuseppe Taddei	Tullio Serafin; Teatro di San Carlo orchestra and chorus	(Recorded by Philips Records); CD: Live Opera Heaven Ltd. Cat: C 1371
1957	Magda Olivero, Eugenio Fernandi, Scipio Colombo	Emidio Tieri; Orchestra sinfonica di Milano della RAI	CD: Opera Depot; Cat: 11066-2
1959	Renata Tebaldi, Mario Del Monaco, George London	Francesco Molinari-Pradelli; Accademia Nazionale di Santa Cecilia orchestra and chorus	CD: Decca; Cat: 1064502
1959	Renata Tebaldi, Franco Corelli, Anselmo Colzani	Mario Parenti; Orchestra del Comitato Estate Livornese (Recording of a performance on 21 October 1959)	CD: Urania; Cat: URN22369
1959	Renata Tebaldi, Giuseppe Di Stefano, Tito Gobbi	Gianandrea Gavazzeni; Teatro alla Scala orchestra and chorus (Recording of a performance in December 1959)	CD: Opera d'Oro; Cat: OPD 1162
1960	Magda Olivero, Alvinio Misciano, Giulio Fioravanti	Fulvio Vernizzi; Orchestra sinfonica di Torino della RAI (Recording of a performance on 7 March 1960)	CD: Melodram; Cat: MEL 27025
1960	Jane Rhodes, Albert Lance, Gabriel Bacquier	Manuel Rosenthal; Paris Opera orchestra and chorus (Performed in French)	33rpm LP: Véga; Cat: 28017-9
1960	Stefania Woytowicz, Sándor Kónya, Kim Borg	Horst Stein; Berlin State Opera orchestra and chorus (Performed in German)	(Recorded by Deutsche Grammophon); CD: Berlin Classics; Cat: 0091172BC
1962	Leontyne Price, Franco Corelli, Cornell MacNeil	Kurt Adler; Metropolitan Opera orchestra and chorus (Recording of a performance on 2 April 1962)	CD: Sony; Cat: 80468
1962	Leontyne Price, Giuseppe Di Stefano, Giuseppe Taddei	Herbert von Karajan; Vienna Philharmonic; Vienna State Opera chorus	(Recorded by Decca for RCA); CD:Decca; Cat: 421 670-2
1964	Maria Callas, Carlo Bergonzi, Tito Gobbi	Georges Prêtre; Conservatoire de Paris orchestra Paris Opera chorus	CD: EMI Classics; Cat: CMS 7 69974-2
1964	Tamara Milashkina, Zurab Andjaparidze, Oleg Klenov	Yevgeny Svetlanov; USSR State Symphony orchestra and chorus (Performed in Russian)	(Recorded by Melodiya); CD: Classical Records (Russia); Cat: CR-024
1965	Maria Callas, Franco Corelli, Tito Gobbi	Fausto Cleva; Metropolitan Opera orchestra and chorus (Recording of a performance on 19 March 1965)	CD: Melodram; Cat: MEL 26030
1965	Maria Callas, Richard Tucker, Tito Gobbi	Fausto Cleva; Metropolitan Opera orchestra and chorus (Recording of a performance on 25 March 1965)	CD: Melodram; Cat.: CDM 26035
1965	Maria Callas, Renato Cioni, Tito Gobbi	Georges Prêtre; Orchestra and Chorus of the Royal Opera House, Covent Garden (Recording of a performance on 5 July 1965)	CD: Divina Records; Cat: DVN 2
1966	Birgit Nilsson, Franco Corelli, Dietrich Fischer-Dieskau	Lorin Maazel; Accademia Nazionale di Santa Cecilia orchestra and chorus	CD: Decca; Cat: 440 051-2
1967	Sena Jurinac, Juan Oncina, Cesare Bardelli	Josef Krips; Vienna State Opera orchestra (Recording of a performance on 14 October 1967)	CD: Myto; EAN: 0608974503154
1972	Leontyne Price, Plácido Domingo, Sherrill Milnes	Zubin Mehta; New Philharmonia Orchestra; John Alldis Choir; Wandsworth School Boys' Choir	CD: RCA Red Seal; Cat: RD 8015
1974	Tamara Milashkina, Vladimir Atlantov, Yuri Mazurok	Mark Ermler; Bolshoi Theatre orchestra and chorus	LP: Melodiya; Cat: C10 8431/6
1976	Galina Vishnevskaya, Franco Bonisolli, Matteo Manuguerra	Mstislav Rostropovich; French National Orchestra; French National Radio chorus	CD: Deutsche Grammophon; Cat: 477 559 9
1976	Montserrat Caballé, José Carreras, Ingvar Wixell	Colin Davis; Royal Opera House orchestra and chorus	CD: Philips Records; Cat: 438359
1977	Virginia Zeani, Corneliu Fanateanu, Nicolae Herlea	Cornel Trailescu; Romanian National Opera orchestra and chorus	(Recorded by Electrecord); CD: World of the Opera; Cat: 5257
1978	Mirella Freni, Luciano Pavarotti, Sherrill Milnes	Nicola Rescigno; National Philharmonic Orchestra; London Opera chorus Wandsworth School Boys' Choir	CD: Decca; Cat: 414036
1979	Katia Ricciarelli, José Carreras, Ruggero Raimondi	Herbert von Karajan; Berlin Philharmonic; Berlin State Opera chorus, Schöneberger Sängerknaben	CD: Deutsche Grammophon; Cat: 4138152
1980	Renata Scotto, Plácido Domingo, Renato Bruson	James Levine; Philharmonia Orchestra; Ambrosian Opera chorus St. Clement Danes School choir	CD: EMI Classics; Cat: 66504
1981	Maria Bieshu, Mikhail Muntyanu, Yuri Mazurok	Alexander Lazarev; Bolshoi Theatre orchestra and chorus (performed in Russian) (Film soundtrack)	LP: Melodiya; Cat: С10 17403 001
1984	Laila Anderson-Palme, Rolf Björling, Erik Sædén	Carlo Felice Cillario; Orchestra and Chorus of the Royal Swedish Opera (Recording of a performance on 20 September 1984)	CD: Sterling; Cat: CDA1837/1838-2
1988	Éva Marton, José Carreras, Juan Pons	Michael Tilson Thomas; Hungarian State Orchestra; Hungarian State R/TV chorus	CD: Sony; Cat: 091175
1990	Kiri Te Kanawa, Giacomo Aragall, Leo Nucci	Georg Solti; National Philharmonic Orchestra; Welsh National Opera Chorus, Royal Opera House Children's chorus	CD: Decca; Cat: 414597
1990	Mirella Freni, Plácido Domingo, Samuel Ramey	Giuseppe Sinopoli; Philharmonia Orchestra; Royal Opera House chorus	CD: Deutsche Grammophon; Cat: 431775
1990	Nelly Miricioiu, Giorgio Lamberti, Silvano Carroli	Alexander Rahbari; Czecho-Slovak Radio Symphony Orchestra; Slovak Philharmonic chorus	CD: Naxos; Cat: 8.660001-2
1990	Raina Kabaivanska, Luciano Pavarotti, Ingvar Wixell	Daniel Oren; Rome Opera orchestra and chorus (Recording of a performance on 13 December 1990)	CD: RCA Victor Red Seal; Cat: 61806
1992	Carol Vaness, Giuseppe Giacomini, Giorgio Zancanaro	Riccardo Muti; Philadelphia Orchestra; Westminster Symphonic Choir	CD: Philips; Cat: 434 595-2
1993	Catherine Malfitano, Plácido Domingo, Ruggero Raimondi	Zubin Mehta; RAI Orchestra Sinfonica and Coro di Roma (Film soundtrack)	CD: Teldec; Cat: 0630-12372-2
1995	Miriam Gauci, Giacomo Aragall, Vicente Sardinero	Alexander Rahbari; Orquesta Sinfonica de Barcelona i Nacional de Catalunya	CD: Discover; Cat: DICD 920360-1
1996	Jane Eaglen, Dennis O'Neill, Gregory Yurisich	David Parry; Philharmonia Orchestra; Geoffrey Mitchell Choir, Peter Kay Children's choir (performed in English)	CD: Chandos Records; Cat: 3000
2000	Angela Gheorghiu, Roberto Alagna, Ruggero Raimondi	Antonio Pappano; Royal Opera House orchestra and chorus Tiffin Boys' Choir (Film soundtrack)	CD: EMI Classics; Cat: 57173
2000	Maria Guleghina, Salvatore Licitra, Leo Nucci	Riccardo Muti; Teatro alla Scala orchestra and chorus	CD: Sony Classical Records; Cat: S2K 89271
2001	Fiorenza Cedolins, Andrea Bocelli, Carlo Guelfi	Zubin Mehta; Maggio Musicale Fiorentino orchestra and chorus	CD: Decca; Cat: 414597
2023	Melody Moore, Ştefan Pop, Lester Lynch	Carlo Montanaro; Rundfunk-Sinfonieorchester Berlin	CD: Pentatone; Cat: PTC 5187 055
2024	Vanessa Goikoetxea, Pietro Pretti, Alexey Markov	Daniele Gatti; Maggio Musicale Fiorentino orchestra and chorus (Recording of a performance on 4 June 2024)	CD: Naxos; Cat: 8.660607-08
2024	Eleonora Buratto, Jonathan Tetelmann, Ludovic Tézier	Daniel Harding; Accademia Nazionale di Santa Cecilia	CD: Deutsche Grammophon; UPC: 00028948669974

== Video ==
Year	Cast (Tosca, Cavaradossi, Scarpia)	Conductor, Opera house and orchestra	Label
1956	Maria Caniglia (actress: Franca Duval), Franco Corelli, Giangiacomo Guelfi (actor: Afro Poli)	Oliviero De Fabritiis, Rome Opera orchestra and chorus, (Film directed by Carmine Gallone)	DVD: Hardy Classic Video; Cat: HCD 4015
1961	Renata Tebaldi, Gianni Poggi, Giangiacomo Guelfi	Arturo Basile; NHK Symphony Orchestra (Recording of a performance on 22 October 1961)	CD: VAI Music; EAN: 0089948441694
1964	Maria Callas, Renato Cioni, Tito Gobbi	Carlo Felice Cillario; Royal Opera House orchestra and chorus (Videotape of live telecast of act 2 at Covent Garden, 9 February 1964)	DVD: EMI Classics; Cat: DVA 4 92851 9
1973	Raina Kabaivanska, Flaviano Labó, Giampietro Mastrei	Oliviero De Fabritiis; NHK Symphony Orchestra (Videotape of live telecast, Tokyo, September 1973)	DVD: Encore; Cat: 3122
1976	Raina Kabaivanska, Plácido Domingo, Sherrill Milnes	Bruno Bartoletti; Philharmonia Orchestra and Ambrosian Singers (Film directed by Gianfranco De Bosio)	DVD: Deutsche Grammophon; Cat: 00440 073 4038
1978	Shirley Verrett, Luciano Pavarotti, Cornell MacNeil	James Conlon; Metropolitan Opera orchestra and chorus (Production by Tito Gobbi)	DVD: Decca; Cat: 0440 074 3410 9 Streaming video: Met Opera on Demand
1984	Éva Marton, Giacomo Aragall, Ingvar Wixell	Daniel Oren; Verona Arena orchestra and chorus (live 10 August); Video director: Brian Large	CD: HO CDBB 478; DVD: Kultur Video D2837
1985	Hildegard Behrens, Plácido Domingo, Cornell MacNeil	Giuseppe Sinopoli; Metropolitan Opera orchestra and chorus (Produced by Franco Zeffirelli)	DVD: Deutsche Grammophon; Cat: 00440 073 4100; SD video: Met Opera on Demand
1993	Catherine Malfitano, Plácido Domingo, Ruggero Raimondi	Zubin Mehta; RAI Orchestra Sinfonica and Coro di Roma (Film Tosca from Rome broadcast live in three parts, directed by Brian Large / Giuseppe Patroni Griffi)	DVD: Kultur Video; Cat: D4524; Blu-ray: Warner Classics
1998	Catherine Malfitano, Richard Margison, Bryn Terfel	Riccardo Chailly; Royal Concertgebouw Orchestra; De Nederlandse Opera chorus (Film directed by Misjel Vermeiren)	DVD: Decca; Cat: 074 3201
2001	Angela Gheorghiu, Roberto Alagna, Ruggero Raimondi	Antonio Pappano; Royal Opera House orchestra and chorus (2001 film directed by Benoît Jacquot)	DVD: EMI Classics; Cat: 7243 5 57173 2 0; 4K UHD: Arthaus Musik
2004	Daniela Dessì, Fabio Armiliato, Ruggero Raimondi	Maurizio Benini; Teatro Real orchestra and chorus (Film directed by Núria Espert)	DVD: Opus Arte; Cat: 901
2006	Fiorenza Cedolins, Marcelo Álvarez, Ruggero Raimondi	Daniel Oren; Orchestra and Chorus of the Verona Arena (Stage director: Hugo de Ana)	DVD: TDK; Cat: DVBD-OPTOV
2007	Antonia Cifrone, Stefano Secco, Giorgio Surian	Valerio Galli; Festival Puccini orchestra and chorus (Stage director: Mario Corradi)	DVD: Dynamic; Cat.33569
2009	Karita Mattila, Marcelo Álvarez, George Gagnidze	Joseph Colaneri; Metropolitan Opera orchestra and chorus (Production by Luc Bondy)	HD video: Met Opera on Demand
2011	Angela Gheorghiu, Jonas Kaufmann, Bryn Terfel	Antonio Pappano; Royal Opera House orchestra and chorus (Stage director: Jonathan Kent)	Blu-ray: EMI Classics; Cat: 404064-9
2013	Patricia Racette, Roberto Alagna, George Gagnidze	Riccardo Frizza; Metropolitan Opera orchestra and chorus (Production by Luc Bondy)	HD video: Met Opera on Demand
2014	Martina Serafin, Marcelo Alvarez, Ludovic Tézier	Daniel Oren; Paris Opera Orchestra and Chorus (Director: Ludovic Tézier)	HD video: Paris Opera Play
2017	Kristine Opolais, Marcelo Álvarez, Marco Vratogna	Simon Rattle; Baden-Baden Easter Festival, Berlin Philharmonic Orchestra (Stage director: Philipp Himmelmann)	Blu-ray: EuroArts; Cat: 206 4174
2018	Sonya Yoncheva, Vittorio Grigolo, Željko Lučić	Emmanuel Villaume; Metropolitan Opera orchestra and chorus (Production by David McVicar)	HD video: Met Opera on Demand
2018	Anja Harteros, Aleksandrs Antonenko, Ludovic Tézier	Christian Thielemann; Salzburg Easter Festival, Staatskapelle Dresden, Salzburg Bach Choir (Stage director: Michael Sturminger)	Blu-ray: C Major; Cat: 748404
2019	Karine Babajanyan, Piotr Beczala, Carlos Álvarez	Marco Armiliato; Vienna State Opera orchestra and chorus (Stage director: Margarete Wallmann)	Blu-ray: C Major; Cat: 759204
2019	Anna Netrebko, Francesco Meli, Luca Salsi	Ricardo Chailly; Teatro alla Scala orchestra and chorus (Stage director: Davide Livermore)	Blu-ray: C Major; Cat: 763404
2021	Elena Stikhina, Freddie De Tommaso, Alexey Markov	Oksana Lyniv; Royal Opera House Orchestra and Chorus (Stage director: Jonathan Kent)	HD video: ROH Stream
2022	Malin Byström, Joshua Guerrero, Gevorg Hakobyan	Lorenzo Viotti; Dutch National Opera, Netherlands Philharmonic Orchestra (Stage director: Barrie Kosky)	Blu-ray: Naxos; Cat: NBD0166V
2023	Sonya Yoncheva, Vittorio Grigolo, Roman Burdenko	Francesco Ivan Ciampa, Chorus & Orchestra of the Arena di Verona, (Production: Hugo de Ana; recorded live, 5 August 2023)	4k video: Unitel
2024	Lise Davidsen, Freddie De Tommaso, Quinn Kelsey	Yannick Nézet-Séguin, Metropolitan Opera Orchestra and Chorus (Stage director: David McVicar)	HD video: Met Opera on Demand
