= Tosca (2001 film) =

2001 film by Benoît Jacquot

- Film poster
- Directed by: Benoît Jacquot
- Based on: La Tosca by Victorien Sardou
- Produced by: Daniel Toscan du Plantier
- Starring: Angela Gheorghiu; Roberto Alagna; Ruggero Raimondi
- Cinematography: Romain Winding
- Edited by: Luc Barnier
- Release date: 2001
- Running time: 126 minutes
- Countries: Italy; France; United Kingdom; Germany
- Language: Italian

Tosca is a 2001 musical drama film written and directed by Benoît Jacquot, closely based on the 1900 opera Tosca with music by Giacomo Puccini and an Italian libretto by Luigi Illica and Giuseppe Giacosa, based in turn on the 1887 play by Victorien Sardou. The film stars soprano Angela Gheorghiu, tenor Roberto Alagna, and baritone Ruggero Raimondi, who mime their parts, sung in Italian. The soundtrack was pre-recorded in 2000 with the Royal Opera House orchestra and chorus conducted by Antonio Pappano.

== Plot ==
Tosca is in love with Cavaradossi, who is arrested by Scarpia for helping escaped prisoner Angelotti to hide. Scarpia has Cavaradossi tortured in the presence of Tosca, who divulges Angelotti's hiding place. Tosca agrees to submit to Scarpia's advances, if he spares Cavaradossi's life in a mock execution and provides her with a safe-conduct to allow her and her lover to escape Rome. After Scarpia finishes writing, she stabs and kills him. She joins her lover on a platform at the top of the Castel Sant'Angelo, where the execution is to take place. She shows him the safe-conduct and explains how she got it, and she assures him it is to be a mock execution. However, Scarpia has tricked her, the execution is real, and Tosca realizes Cavaradossi is dead. Scarpia's murder has been discovered, and Spoleta can be heard coming to arrest her. With a final cry, she leaps from the parapet to her death.

== Cast ==
- Angela Gheorghiu as Floria Tosca, a singer
- Roberto Alagna as Mario Cavaradossi, a painter
- Ruggero Raimondi as Baron Scarpia, Chief of Police
- Maurizio Muraro as Cesare Angelotti, former Consul of the Roman Republic
- Enrico Fissore as a sacristan
- David Cangelosi as Spoletta, a police agent
- Sorin Coliban as Sciarrone, a gendarme
- Gwynne Howell as a prison guard
- James Savage-Hanford as a shepherd boy

== Release ==
The soundtrack album was recorded at Abbey Road Studio No. 1 in August 2000 and issued on CD in 2001 by EMI Classics. The film premiered at the Venice Film Festival (out of competition) on September 1, 2001, and also received a pre-release screening on December 1, 2001, at the opera house in Lucca, where Puccini was born. It was released in movie theaters in the UK on April 5, 2002, and released in the United States by Avatar Films in July 2002. On home video, it was released in the UK in 2003 by Opus Arte in DVD format (PAL, anamorphic widescreen 16:9 picture format, 2-channel PCM and 5.1-channel DTS surround sound, subtitled) and in the United States in 2005 by Kultur (NTSC, widescreen, 2-channel and multichannel surround sound). In 2017 it was released in 4K Ultra HD and Blu-ray formats by Arthaus Musik.

== Reception ==
The film received generally positive reviews. The review aggregator Rotten Tomatoes reported an approval rating of 65%, with an average score of 6.3/10, based on 37 reviews. John von Rhein of the Chicago Tribune suggested "You would be better off investing in the worthy EMI recording that serves as the soundtrack, or the home video of the 1992 Malfitano–Domingo production."

However, the opera critic Edward Greenfield, writing in 2003 in the classical music review magazine Gramophone, stated: "I cannot think of a film of Tosca quite as compelling as this." Robert Denerstein of the Denver Rocky Mountain News wrote: "From the trembling fury of Gheorgiu's Tosca to the penetrating stare of Raimondi's Scarpia, this Tosca blazes with passion. At its best, it's sublime."

Metacritic, which uses a weighted average, assigned the film a score of 70 out of 100, based on eighteen critics, indicating "generally favorable" reviews.

== See also ==
- Tosca discography
