= Bruno Comparetti =

French tenor

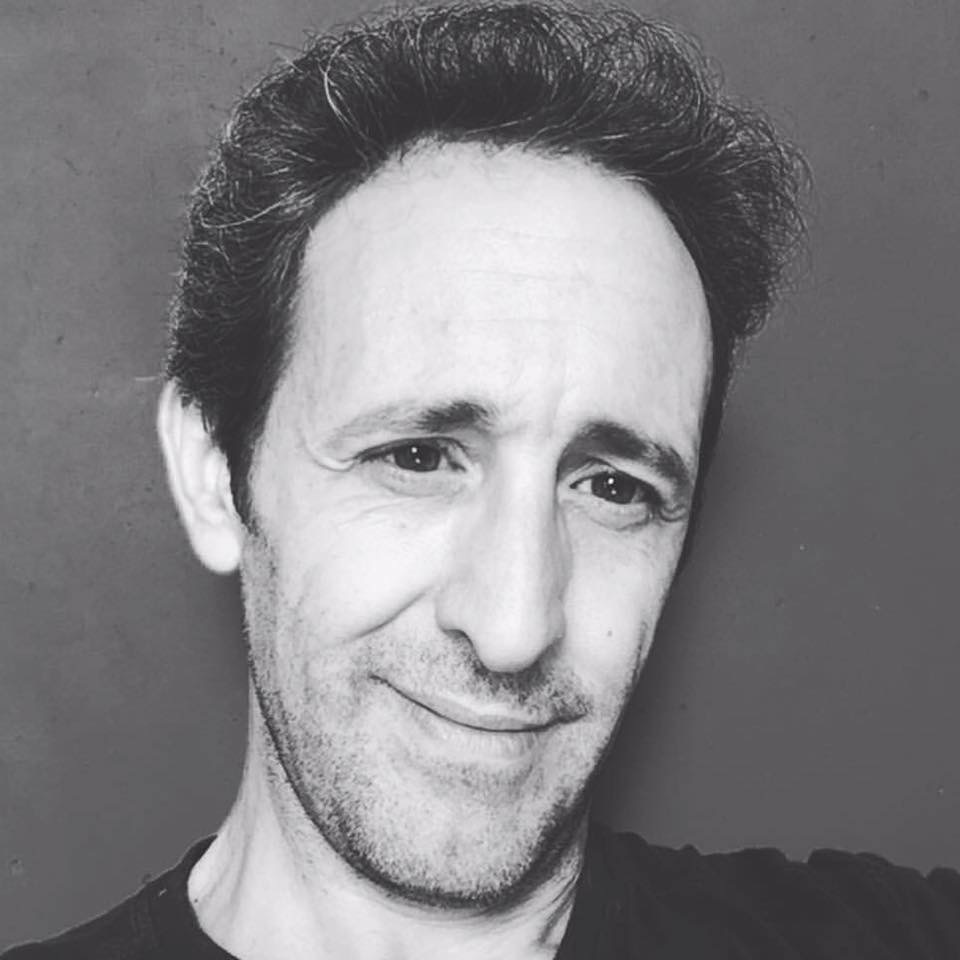
Bruno Comparetti opera singer, tenor

Bruno Comparetti is a contemporary Franco-Sicilian tenor. He studied singing in Barcelona with the Spanish tenor Eduardo Gimenez who taught him the art of bel canto as well as the singing technique inherited from his friend and teacher, Spanish tenor Alfredo Kraus.

== Biography ==
Comparetti was born in France to Sardinian and Sicilian parents. He began his career in 1999, in the role of Count Almaviva in Rossini's Barbier de Séville at the Concertgebouw of Amsterdam. Very quickly, he sang on lyrical stages such as the Opéra de Lyon, the Opéra de Marseille, the Capitole de Toulouse, the Opéra national de Bordeaux, the Opéra de Tours, the Opéra de Besançon, the Théâtre du Châtelet, the Toulon Opera, the Théâtre Impérial de Compiègne, the Opéra d'Avignon, the Angers-Nantes Opéra as well as abroad, Liverpool Opera, the Theater Freiburg, the Bremen Opera and also at the Gdansk Opera.

From 2001 to 2003, he was artist-in-residence at the Opéra National de Lyon.

These roles include among others: Ernesto in Don Pasquale at the Opéra National de Lyon under the direction of Maestro Maurizio Benini, Edgardo and Arturo in Donizetti's Lucia di Lammermoor, French and Italian versions, Adolphe Adam's Le postillon de Longjumeau, the title roles in Auber's Haydée, and Halévy's Charles VI, Rodolfo in Puccini's La Bohème, Alfredo in Traviata, the Duke of Mantova in Verdi's Rigoletto, Faust, Tybalt in Roméo et Juliette and Gounod's Mireille, Offenbach's Barbe Bleue, Federico in Donizetti's Emilia di Liverpool, Eisenstein in J.Strauss's la Chauve Souris... In early 2006, he was engaged at the Opéra Bastille to sing the lead role in the rehearsals of the opera Julietta by Martinů.

In September 2007, he performed at the Opéra de Marseille for the world premiere of Marius et Fanny after Marcel Pagnol, composed by Vladimir Cosma in the role of Mr Brun with Roberto Alagna and Angela Gheorghiu directed by Jean-Louis Grinda.

He has performed with conductors such as Giuliano Carella, Maurizio Benini, Miquel Ortega, Luciano Accocella, Claude Schnitzler, Iván Fischer, Yuri Temirkanov, Lawrence Foster, Nader Abbassi and directors such as Yannis Kokkos, Willy Decker, Jean-Louis Grinda, Carlos Wagner, Vincent Boussard, Mireille Larroche, Renée Auphan, Petrika Ionesco...

For the 2011–2012 season, he sang Tybalt in Gounod's Roméo et Juliette and the serenade singer in Henri Sauguet's la Chartreuse de Parme at the Opéra de Marseille as well as the Brazilian in Offenbach's la Vie Parisienne at the Angers-Nantes Opéra.

In August 2012, he returned to Vincent's role in Gounod's Mireille for the 1st edition of the "Opera Côté jardin" Festival at the Théâtre de Verdure de Gémenos.

At the end of 2012, he sang Anselmo in Mitch Leigh's Man of La Mancha for his debut at the Opéra de Monte-Carlo.

In August 2013, Bruno Comparetti sang again the role of Alfredo in Verdi's Traviata at the "Opéra Côté jardin" Festival at the Théâtre de Verdure de Gemenos, direction Pierre Iodice.

Among his plans for 2014 is the world premiere of the opera Colomba after Prosper Mérimée at the Opéra de Marseille, composed by Jean-Claude Petit for the role of Orlanduccio Barricini and a sailor.

As of 2014–2015, he sang the title role in Francis Lopez's The Prince of Madrid in Lagny-sur-Marne to celebrate the 100th anniversary of Luis Mariano's birth

He began his career in 1999 at the Angers-Nantes Opéra in the role of Almaviva in Rossini's The Barber of Seville, a role that he will resume in 2000 at the Concertgebouw of Amsterdam.

Some of the steps in his career include Ernesto in Don Pasquale at the Opéra national de Lyon under the direction of maestro Maurizio Benini as well as at the Freiburg Opera. He sang in productions of Verdi's Otello (dir. Ivan Fischer), Massenet's Werther with Béatrice Uria-Monzon (conducted by Willy Decker) at the Opéra national de Lyon, Le postillon de Lonjumeau at the Opéra de Dijon for the bicentenary of the birth of Adolphe Adam. The title roles in Auber's Haydée, and in Halévy's Charles VI dir. Miquel Ortega at the Théâtre Impérial de Compiègne.

In parallel to his career as a lyrical singer, Bruno Comparetti is passionate about teaching singing in all musical styles.
