= Sorin Coliban =

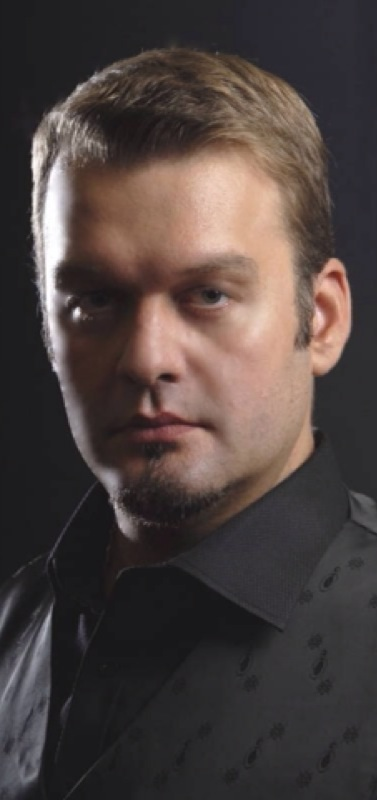

Background information
- Born: Sorin Coliban; 1976 (age 49–50); Bucharest, Romania
- Origin: Romanian
- Genre: Opera
- Instrument: Vocals
- Years active: 1994–present
- Website: sorincoliban.com

Sorin Coliban (born 1976 in Bucharest) is a Romanian opera singer with an international career. His voice range is bass–baritone. He is known for the volume and projection of his voice, both of which help him to sing both bass and baritone roles. He is one of the few singers to have performed (in the contemporary opera Macbeth by Salvatore Sciarrino in Luzern in 2004) with two different voices in the same performance: bass-baritone and countertenor.

== Biography ==
=== Early career ===
Sorin Coliban graduated in opera, lied and vocal symphonic singing sections at the Academy of Music in Bucharest and also attended classes headed by well known Romanian soprano Ileana Cotrubaș twice in 1994 and 2012. He improved his Rossini stile and technique of singing at the Accademia Rossiniana by the well-known Rossini Opera Festival in Pesaro, Italy under the guidance of famous conductor Alberto Zedda in the year 2001.

Early in his career he performed at venues such as the Royal Opera House in London, L'Opéra Bastille in Paris, Palais Garnier, the Théâtre du Châtelet in Paris, the War Memorial Opera House in San Francisco, the Bavarian State Opera in Munich and the Tel Aviv Performing Arts Center in Tel Aviv. His career gained momentum after winning the singing competition "The quest for Don Giovanni" in Athens in 1994. The prize for winning the competition was the chance to perform the title role in Don Giovanni by Mozart, in a unique production directed by the famous Italian bass Ruggero Raimondi, costume designer was the former Christian Dior Fashion House designer Marc Bohan at Athens Megaro-Mousikis in March 1996.

=== International recognition ===
After this debut in Athens, he started immediately to develop his international singing career. At the ROH Covent Garden (La Bohème/Colline 1996, Rigoletto/Monterone 1997 and Roméo et Juliette/Capulet 2000), in Paris at L'Opéra Bastille (Carmen/Zuniga 1997, La Cenerentola/Alidoro 1998, La Bohème/Colline 1999) and the Théâtre du Châtelet, in San Francisco (Lucia di Lammermoor, Raimondo 1999), in Switzerland at St. Gallen (Simone Boccanegra/Fiesco), Klagenfurt (Italian version of Don Carlo/Filippo II 2001), Luzern (2002-2004: Mosé/Title part, Macbeth in Macbeth by Salvatore Sciarrino, Der fliegende Holländer/Holländer, Zauberflöte/Sarastro), Mozart Festival in La Coruña in Spain (Don Giovanni/Commendatore, 2005, Die Zauberflöte/Sarastro, 2007) at Wiener Festwochen and the Staatsoper and Volksoper in Vienna and the Theater Basel (frz./Don Carlos/Grand Inquisiteur 2007) and many others.

Besides the opera repertoire he is a demanded soloist in vocal symphonic concerts with works by Verdi, Bach, Mahler and Mendelssohn, and in song recitals (Vienna, Bucharest and Baden).

== Recordings ==
Together with Angela Gheorghiu, Roberto Alagna, and Ruggero Raimondi, Coliban was cast for the movie production of Tosca; an opera movie released internationally in 2002 at the film festival in Venice. In 2009 he appeared on the Blu-ray of the Karol Szymanowski opera King Roger in the staging of the British director David Pountney recorded live at the Bregenz Festival in Austria.

Sorin Coliban also took part in audio and video opera recordings with EMI classics and NAXOS and in the "Arias" (June 2012) recital CD of bass baritone Erwin Schrott by Sony Classical. and in 2017 he appeared as Sparafucile on the DVD of Rigoletto by Giuseppe Verdi recorded live at the Opera Festival in the Quarry, Sankt Margarethen im Burgenland, Austria. 2018- Fatima by Austrian composer Johanna Doderer DVD with the world premiere of this children opera staged on the big stage of the Vienna State Opera in the leading role of the Schlossherr. Special edition Box with 22 CD, 150 Years Vienna State Opera . Un ballo in maschera, by G. Verdi, Count Horn (live recorded), Conductor Jesus Lopez Cobos with Piotr Beczala, Dmitri Hvorostovsky, Krassimira Stoyanova, Nadia Krasteva 2019 . Angelotti in Tosca with Piotr Beczala, Karine Babajanyan, Carlos Álvarez live DVD recorded by Unitel.de from the Vienna State Opera in June 2019 conductor Marco Armiliato.

== Collaborations ==
Coliban has sung under the baton of conductors such as Bernard Haitink, Franz Welser-Möst, Seiji Ozawa, Alberto Zedda, Leonard Slatkin, James Conlon, Kent Nagano, Pinchas Steinberg, Richard Bonynge, Zubin Mehta, Antonio Pappano, Valery Gergiev, Donald Runnicles, and Sebastian Weigle, and worked with the stage directors such as Giancarlo Del Monaco, Robert Carsen, Sven Eric Bechtolf, Jonathan Miller, Graham Vick, Luc Bondi, Jean-Louis Martinoty, Nicolas Joel, Benoît Jaquot, and Daniele Abbado among others.

== Activity at the State Opera and Volksoper in Vienna ==
In 2004, Coliban became a member of Volksoper in Vienna, and since then has taken roles such as Il Commendatore (Don Giovanni), Müller (Irrelohe), Zuniga (Carmen), Bartolo (Le nozze di Figaro), Friedrich Engel (Der Evangelimann) und Konrad Nachtigall (Die Meistersinger von Nürnberg), Timur (Turandot), Eremit (Der Freischütz), Bauer (Die Kluge), Tommaso (Tiefland), Basilio (Der Barbier von Sevilla). At Wiener Staatsoper he performed Monterone ("Rigoletto), Grand Inquisiteur (French version of Don Carlos), and since the 2008–2009 season, Filippo II("Don Carlo"), Sarastro ("The Magic flute"), Hermann ("Tannhäuser"), Capulet (Roméo et Juliette), Alidoro (La Cenerentola"), Fra Melitone (La forza del destino by Verdi), Bartolo (Le nozze di Figaro), Basilio (Il Barbiere di Siviglia), Fafner and Fasolt ("Rheingold" and "Siegfried"), Commendatore, Geronte di Ravoir in Manon Lescaut and Colline in La bohème by Puccini, amongst others.

== Recent career ==
In 2009, he made his debut at the festival Bregenzer Festspiele in Austria, with Ramfis in Aida by Verdi and the Archbishop in King Roger by Szymanowski. He returned there in the summer of 2010. In 2011, 2012 and 2013 he sang, among other roles, Landgraf Herrmann in Tannhäuser by Wagner, Gorjančikov in From the House of the Dead by Janáček at the State Opera in Vienna, both under the baton of Franz Welser-Möst, Basilio in Il barbiere di Siviglia, Sarastro in Die Zauberflöte also at the Vienna State Opera, made his debut in the Musikverein in Vienna with a lieder recital and made his debut in the summer 2013 at the Bayreuth Festival in the bicentennial new Richard Wagner Ring production led by Russian conductor Kirill Petrenko and directed by Frank Castorf. In the seasons 2014 to 2017, he debuted the roles of Filippo II in Don Carlo, Alidoro in La Cenerentola, Gonzalo in The Tempest, a contemporary opera by Thomas Ades in a production of the Metropolitan Opera, The Lord of the Castle in the opera Fatima by Johanna Doderer at the Vienna State Opera, Kontchak in Prince Igor by Alexander Borodin in a new production at the Vienna Volksoper and Peneios in Daphne by Richard Strauss at the Berlin Philharmonic under maestro Marek Janowski and resang Fafner in Siegfried with the Odense Symphony Orchestra under the baton of Alexander Vedernikov and Sarastro in Die Zauberflöte for the first time in the new 2013 production at the Vienna State Opera. 2015-2020 sang Don Giovanni (title role) and Don Pasquale at the Opera Craiova in Romania and in Sweden, returned as the Khan Kontchak from Prince Igor by Alexander Borodin at the Volksoper in Vienna and debuted Sparafucile from Rigoletto by Giuseppe Verdi at the Festival Oper im Steinbruch in Austria (broadcast live on national Austrian TV ORF).On the 23.2.2020 he debuted the role of Satan in the massive Oratorio by Cesar Franck, les Béatitudes at the Elbphilharmonie in Hamburg. On 20 February 2021, he debuted at La Scala in Milan, in a new Production of Salome by Richard Strauss conducted by Riccardo Chailly and staged by Damiano Michieletto . The performance was broadcast by Italian cultural television channel Rai 5.In the summer of 2021 he returned as Timur in Turandot by Giacomo Puccini at the Festival Oper im Steinbruch in Burgenland Austria. In autumn - winter 2021, he was on a tour with a modern new production of Giuseppe Verdi's Aida in the role of Ramfis, staged by Roland Schwab, conducted by Jakob Hultberg and produced by The Danish National Opera Den Jyske Opera, with performances in the most important towns of Denmark including Copenhagen Det Kongelige Teater.Two roles at Teatro alla Scala in Milan in 2022, Samuel in a new production of Un ballo in maschera by G.Verdi and Gonzalo in The tempest by Thomas Adès conducted by the composer himself. In June 2022 returned for Timur in Turandot at the Volksoper and in Budapest Wagner Days Festival sang Hunding in Die Walküre and Fasolt in Das Rheingold under the baton of Ádám Fischer. He sustained his first masterclass in opera and lied singing together with mezzosoprano Aura Twarowska at Lugoj Clasic Festival, Lugoj, Romania in september 2022.
