= Coliban =

Coliban is a Romanian surname. Notable people with the surname include:

- Ion Coliban (born 1925, date of death unknown), Romanian skier
- Sorin Coliban (born 1976), Romanian opera singer
