= Angela Gheorghiu discography =

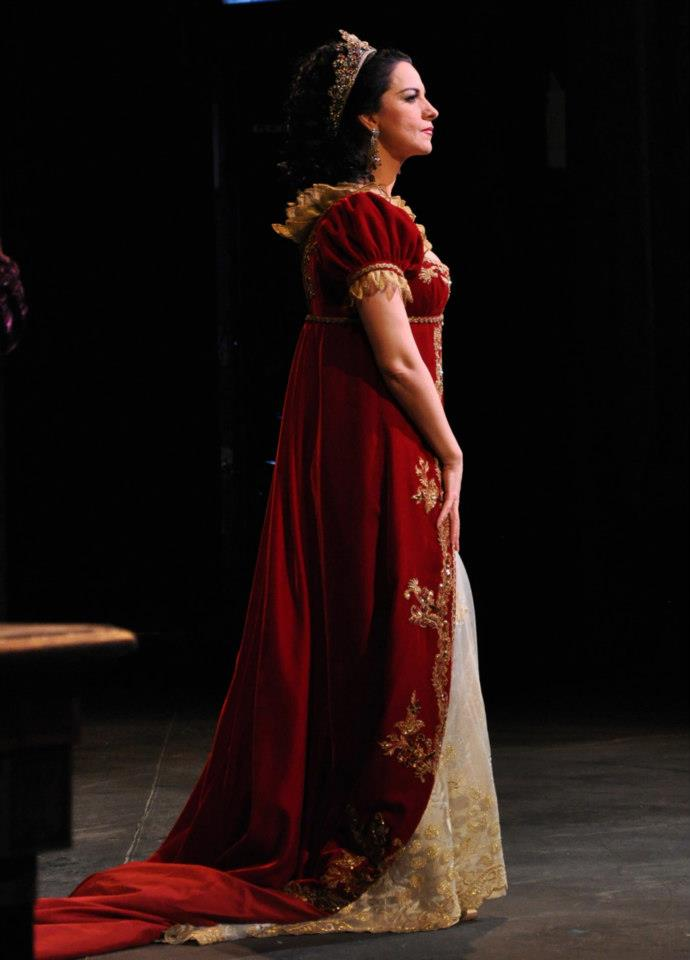
Angela during the dress rehearsal for Tosca at San Francisco Opera, November 2012

This is a list of recordings of the Romanian soprano opera singer Angela Gheorghiu (born 7 September 1965). The list includes live and studio recordings available in audio CD, VHS and DVD.

== Operas, concert works ==
=== Audio ===
Date	Recording	Label	No. and type
1994	La traviata (Verdi)	Decca	000289 448 1192 6 CD
1996	L'elisir d'amore (Donizetti)	Decca	000289 478 2491 6 CD
1996	Carmen (Bizet)	Teldec	B000000S8P CD
1998	Roméo et Juliette (Gounod)	EMI	0094635862423 CD
1999	La bohème (Puccini)	Decca	000289 466 0702 2 CD
1999	Il trittico (Puccini)	EMI	0724355658722 CD
1999	Werther (Massenet)	EMI	0724355682024 CD
2000	Manon (Massenet)	EMI	0724355700520 CD
2001	Messa da Requiem (Verdi)	EMI	0724355716828 CD
2001	Tosca (Puccini)	EMI	0724355717320 CD
2002	Il trovatore (Verdi)	EMI	0724355736024 CD
2003	Carmen (Bizet)	EMI	0094635243529 CD
2008	Marius et Fanny	Larghetto	CD
2009	Madama Butterfly (Puccini)	EMI	5099926418728 CD
2009	L'amico Fritz (Mascagni)	Deutsche Grammophon	00289 477 8367 CD
2011	Fedora (Giordano)	Deutsche Grammophon	000289 477 8367 1 CD
2010 (Note: Reissued as part of "Home of the Opera" collection)	Roméo et Juliette (Gounod)	EMI Classics	5099964070025 CD
2010	La rondine (Puccini)	EMI Classics	509996407482 CD

=== Video ===
Date	Recording	Label	No. and type
1994	La traviata (Verdi)	Decca	DVD
1996	L'elisir d'amore (Donizetti)	Decca	DVD
1996	La rondine (Puccini)	EMI	DVD
2001	Messa da Requiem (Verdi)	EMI	DVD
2001	Tosca (Puccini)	EMI	DVD
2003	Roméo et Juliette (Gounod)	Arthaus Musik	DVD
2007	La traviata (Verdi)	Arthaus Musik	DVD/Blu-ray
2007 (Note: Live from La Scala, Milan)	La traviata (Verdi)	Arthaus Musik	DVD
2008 (Note: Live from the Met, New York)	La bohème (Puccini)	EMI	DVD
2010	La rondine (Puccini)	EMI	DVD
2010 (Note: Live from Royal Opera House, London)	Faust (Gounod)	EMI	DVD
2012	Adriana Lecouvreur (Cilea)	Decca	DVD/Blu-ray
2012	Tosca (Puccini)	EMI	DVD/Blu-ray

== Solo recitals ==
Date	Recording	Label	No. and type
1988 (Note: Released under her maiden name Burlacu)	Țara Mea (Paul Urmuzescu)	Electrecord	F.E. '88 015 LP
1995	The Puccini Experience	RCA	B0000024FD CD
1996	Arias	Decca	000289 452 4172 2 CD
1996	Roberto Alagna & Angela Gheorghiu – Duets and Arias	EMI	0724355611727 CD
1998	My World	Decca	458 3602 CD
1998	Angela Gheorghiu & Roberto Alagna – Verdi per due	EMI	0724355665621 CD
2000	Verdi Heroines	Decca	000289 466 9522 7 CD
2001	Casta Diva	EMI	0724355716323 CD
2001	Mysterium – Sacred Arias	Decca	000289 466 1022 0 CD
2005	Puccini Opera Arias	EMI	0094633235526 CD
2008	Angela & Roberto Forever	EMI	5099921459924 CD
2011	Homage to Maria Callas	Warner Classics	5099963150926 CD
2013	O, ce veste minunată! Colinde românești	MediaPro Music	B00GUZJNHA CD
2014	Guardian Angel. Christmas Carols	MediaPro Music	5948218003695 CD
2017	Eternamente: The Verismo Album	Warner Classics	0190295780241 CD + vinyl
2019	Plaisir d'amour	Decca Classics	CD
2021	Romanian Songs	Warner Classics	Digital
2021	Vangelis: Juno to Jupiter	Decca Records	CD + vinyl + Digital

== Solo compilations ==
Date	Recording	Label	No. and type
2004	The Essential Angela Gheorghiu	Decca	473 3202 2 CD
2004	Diva	EMI	0724355770622 CD
2004	Art of Angela Gheorghiu	Decca	DVD x 2
2008	My Puccini	EMI	2174412 CD
2010	Best of Angela Gheorghiu – Diva	EMI Japan	CD + DVD
2013	Angela Gheorghiu chante Verdi	Warner Classics	5099995894522 CD
2013	The Sound of Angela Gheorghiu	Classic fM	0028948083466
2015	Autograph. 25th Anniversary Boxed Set	Warner Classics	0825646190478 CD
2017	The Complete Recitals on Warner Classics	Warner Classics	0190295899479 CD

== EP / single ==
Date	Recording	Label	No. and type
2005	Numele Tău with Ștefan Bănică Jr.	Cat Music	
2012	Habanera EP with Maria Callas (Record Store Day UK exclusive 2012)	EMI / HMV	RSD2012 7" vinyl limited edition
2013	Copacul	MediaPro Music	

== Live concerts ==
=== Audio ===
Date	Recording	Label	No. and type
2002	Angela Gheorghiu: Live From Covent Garden	EMI	0724355726421 CD
2004	Last Night at the Proms	Warner Classics	B0002CPEPM CD
2005	25 Jaar Koningin Beatrix	EMI	072455806925 CD
2007	Live From La Scala	EMI	094639442027 CD
2017	Live from Covent Garden	Warner Classics	0190295889999 CD

=== Video ===
Date	Recording	Label	Type
1995	Plácido Domingo: Live In Prague With Angela Gheorghiu	Beckmann Visual Publishing	DVD
1996	James Levine's 25th Anniversary Metropolitan Opera Gala	DG	DVD
2001	Classics on a Summer's Evening	EMI	DVD
2002	Angela Gheorghiu: Live From Covent Garden	EMI	DVD
2002	Prom at the Palace	Opus Arte	DVD
2005	25 Jaar Koningin Beatrix	EMI	DVD
2008	Great Opera Arias: Concert with Domingo, Alagna, Gheorghiu	Kultur Video	DVD
2009	Waldbühne Concert – Italian Night	Kultur Video	DVD
2009	Tribute to Pavarotti – One Amazing Weekend in Petra	Decca	DVD

== Compilations ==
Date	Recording	Label	No. and type
2010	Classical Legends – In Their Own Words	EMI	CD
2010	Les Stars du Classique	EMI UK/Zoom	5099990582325 CD
2010	Classical 2011	EMI	B00485A7LA CD
2012	Solti: The Legacy 1937-97	Decca	B0091HVM7I CD

== Credits ==
Date	Recording	Track	Label
2012	Love Affair by Holograf	"Nu mai e timp"	MediaPro Music

== See also ==
- List of music released by Romanian artists that has charted in major music markets
