= Comparetti =

Comparetti is an Italian surname. Notable people with the surname include:

- Bruno Comparetti, Italian-French tenor
- Domenico Comparetti (1835–1927), Italian scholar
