= Petrika =

Petrika; is a given name and a surname.

- Ibolya Petrika, Hungarian sprinter
- Petrika Ionesco (born 1946), French stage director and playwright
