= Elena Dan =

Romanian opera singer

- Birth name: Elena Burlacu
- Also known as: Nina
- Born: 1967; Adjud, Socialist Republic of Romania
- Died: 1996 (aged 28–29)

Elena "Nina" Dan (née Burlacu, 1967–1996) was a Romanian opera singer.

== Biography ==
Elena Burlacu was born in 1967 in Adjud, Romania. She was the younger sister and only sibling of Angela Gheorghiu. She joined Angela at the music boarding school in Bucharest and also graduated from the National University of Music Bucharest. She made her international debut in Donizetti's L'elisir d'amore at Opéra National de Lyon in 1996. The opera was filmed and recorded and was made and is still available on DVD and CD.

Angela and Elena were, as Angela puts it 'inseparable, like twins'. In 1994, Angela Gheorgiu described Elena as follows: 'she is more beautiful than I and sings even better!'. Angela dedicated her 'Mysterium' recording to her sister.

Elena Dan died in 1996 in an accident. Angela Gheorghiu commented, "she was more than a sister to me... She was only a year younger. We were inseparable almost like twins, although she was blonde and green-eyed. She was another me. But, of course, it's worse for my mother. She is really very badly hit."

Elena Dan married a doctor, Andrei Dan, whilst still attending the National University of Music in Bucharest. In 1990, she and Andrei had a daughter called Ioana. After Andrei's death in 2001, Ioana was adopted by her sister, Angela Gheorghiu. Ioana now lives in the UK and is a university student.

== Recordings ==
- Donizetti - L'Elisir d'Amore (Alagna, Gheorghiu, Scaltriti, Alaimo, Dan / Pido, Lyon Opera) CD - complete recording (Decca, 1997)
- Donizetti - L'Elisir d'Amore (Alagna, Gheorghiu, Scaltriti, Alaimo, Dan / Pido, Lyon Opera) DVD (Decca, 1997)
- Donizetti - L'Elisir d'Amore (Alagna, Gheorghiu, Scaltriti, Alaimo, Dan / Pido, Lyon Opera) DVD Special Edition with Highlights CD (Decca, 2002)
