= Le val d'Andorre =

Opéra comique by Fromental Halévy

- Opéra comique by Fromental Halévy
- Title Page of the Score (Paris 1851)
- Translation: The Valley of Andorra
- Librettist: Jules-Henri Vernoy de Saint-Georges
- Language: French
- Premiere: 11 November 1848; Opéra-Comique, Paris

Le val d'Andorre (The Valley of Andorra) is an opéra comique by Fromental Halévy with a libretto by Saint-Georges. Although today almost completely forgotten, it was one of Halévy's greatest successes, running for 165 performances and restoring the then-precarious financial situation of the Opéra-Comique in Paris, where it was given its premiere on 11 November 1848.

== Production history ==
After the premiere, the reviewer of the Parisian Revue et gazette musicale wrote "This is the most brilliant total success ever recorded at the Opéra-Comique."

The opera was translated into German and produced in 1849 in Leipzig, where it was praised by Ignaz Moscheles – "Music of a genuine dramatic character, which has more flow of melody than his other operas. The subject is cleverly worked out and very impressive." In 1850 it opened in London, to mediocre reviews, but was graced by a visit from Queen Victoria (for which the French cast had to be hurriedly coached to sing God Save the Queen).

== Roles ==
Role	Voice type	Premiere Cast, 11 November 1848
Georgette	soprano	Anne-Benoîte-Louise Lavoye
Jacques Sincère	bass	Charles-Amable Battaille
L'endormi	bass	
Le joyeux	tenor	M Mocker
Rose de Mai	soprano	Mlle Darcier
Saturnin	tenor	M Jourdan
Stéphan	tenor	M Audran
Thérèse	mezzo-soprano	Mlle Revilly

== Synopsis ==
In Andorra, Stéphan (tenor) seeks to escape conscription by the French army. He is loved by the young Rose-de-Mai (soprano), Rose's mistress, the widow Thérèse (mezzo-soprano) and the wealthy Georgette (soprano). When he is condemned to death for desertion, Rose ransoms him by stealing money from Thérèse, and claiming that the money is from Georgette. In a typically improbable twist (stolen from The Marriage of Figaro), Rose turns out to be Thérèse's long-lost daughter, Georgette withdraws, and Rose de Mai and Stéphan are free to marry.

Georgette

Rose-de-Mai

Thérèse

Stéphan
