= Minodora Cliveti =

Romanian politician (born 1955)

Minodora Cliveti MEP
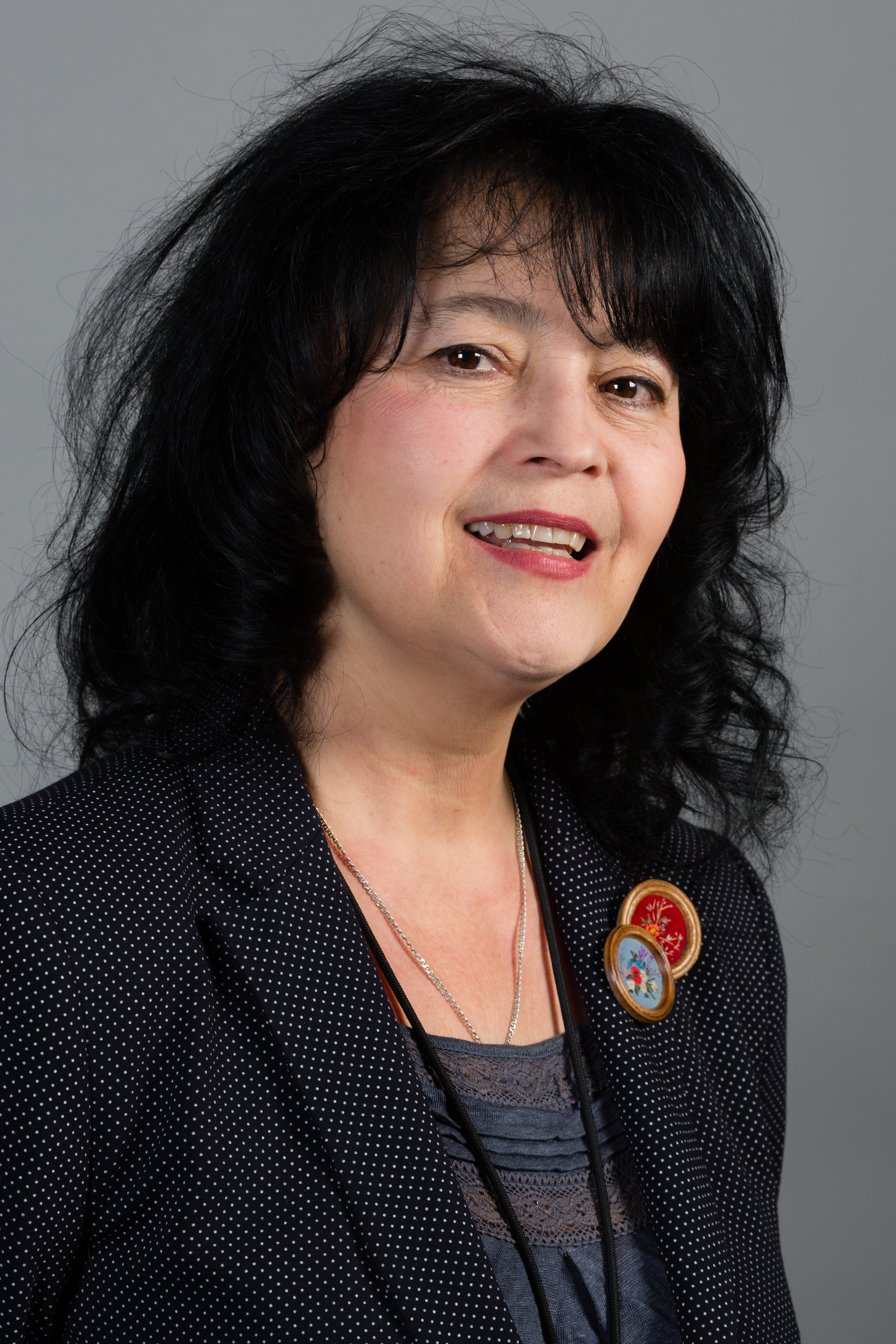
- In office 18 May 2012 – 30 June 2014

Personal details
- Born: 24 October 1955 (age 70) Adjud
- Party: Social Democratic Party

Video Introduction (English) / (Romanian)

Minodora Cliveti (born 24 October 1955) is a Romanian Social Democratic Party politician. In May 2012, she took her seat in the European Parliament in place of Rovana Plumb, who had resigned following her appointment as Environment Minister of Romania.

Cliveti graduated from the law faculty of Alexandru Ioan Cuza University in 1978. She practised as a lawyer in Bacău before becoming a diplomat in the Ministry of Foreign Affairs in 1996. She sat in the Chamber of Deputies of Romania from 2000 to 2008.
