= Louise Lavoye =

French soprano

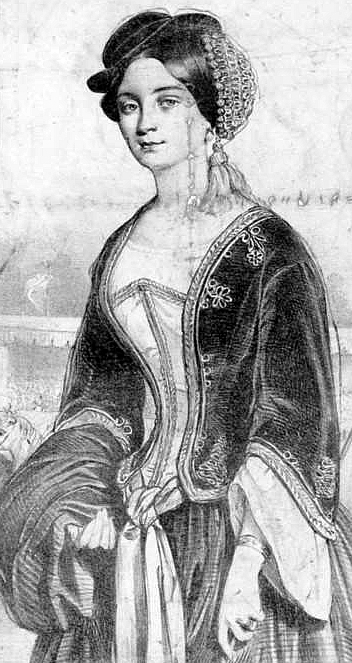
Anne-Benoîte-Louise Lavoye

Mlle. Lavoye, in the role of Georgette, Le val d'Andorre, 2nd Act

Mlle. Lavoye, in the role of Georgette, Le val d'Andorre, 3rd Act

Anne-Benoîte-Louise Lavoye (28 June 1823 – 10 October 1897) was a 19th-century French soprano born in Dunkirk.

== Biography ==
Lavoye studied at the Conservatoire de Lille and won First Prize in piano at age 11 in 1834, First Prize of vocalisation in 1835 and Honorary Prize in piano in 1836. She was admitted at the Conservatoire royal de musique in Laure Cinti-Damoreau's class. In 1838 she won the Honorary Prize in harmony and went on to win the Prizes in singing: Second prize for singing in 1839, First prize in singing in 1840. She won a First Prize for opéra comique in 1842 and made her debut in 1843 at the Opéra-Comique in Daniel-François-Esprit Auber's l'Ambassadrice. For Auber and Eugène Scribe, she created the roles of Zerbina in La Sirène on 26 March 1844 and Haydée in Haydée ou Le Secret on 28 December 1847.

She distinguished herself by the purity of her style, the freshness and charm of her voice, and her virtuosity. The most difficult roles of the repertoire were entrusted to her, and she was one of the most zealous servants of the Salle Favart. She premiered several operas, including Auber's La Sirène and Haydée ou Le Secret, Halévy's Les Mousquetaires de la reine, and Le val d'Andorre, Charpentier's Actéon, and Boisselot's Ne touchez pas à la reine.

Louise Lavoye died in Paris on 10 October 1897.
