= Adjud =

- Municipality
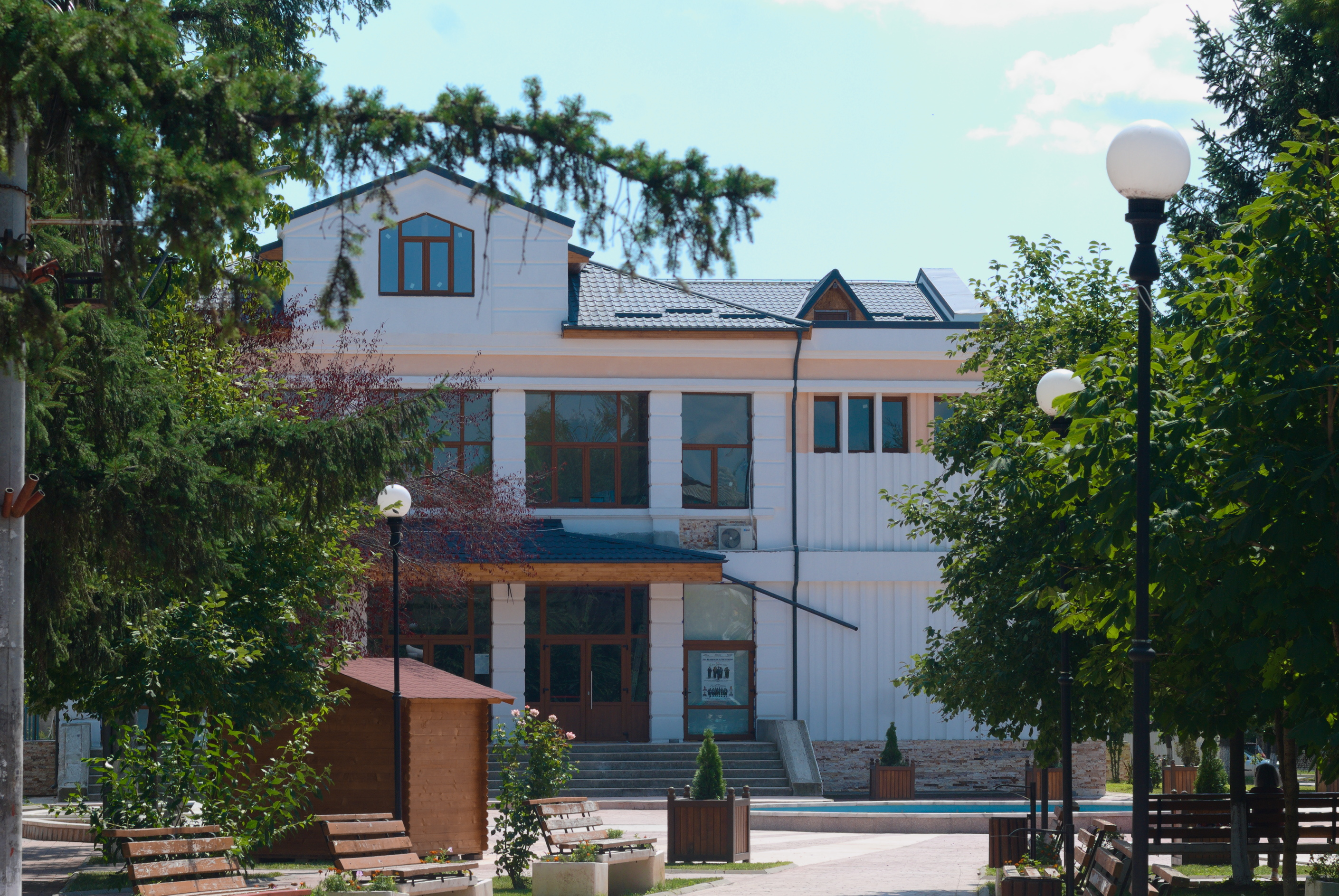
- Adjud cultural center

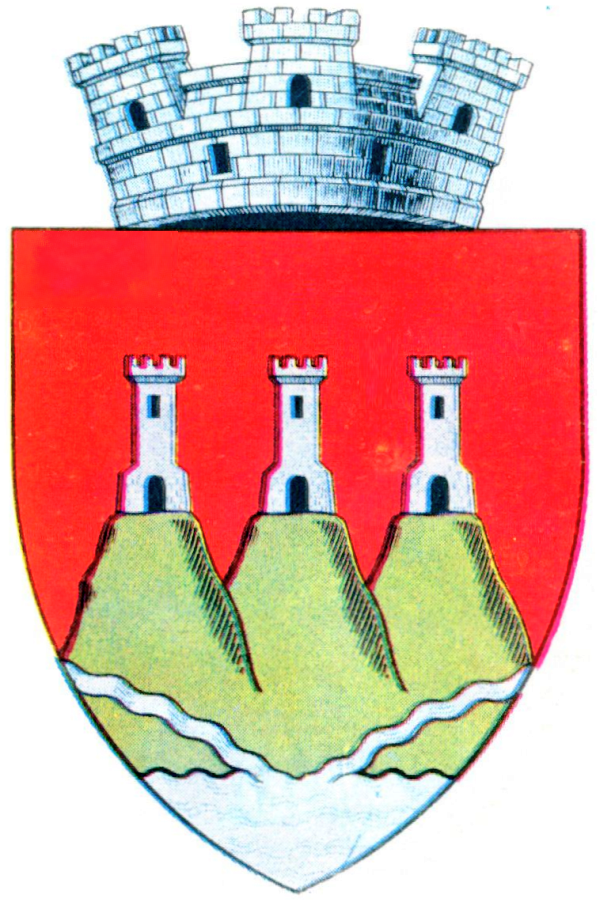
- Coat of arms

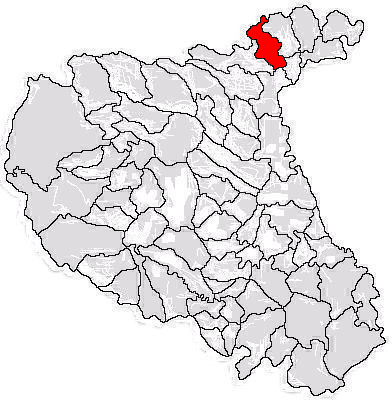
- Location in Vrancea County

- Location in Romania
- Coordinates: 46°6′0″N 27°10′47″E
- Country: Romania
- County: Vrancea

Government
  - Mayor (2024–2028): George-Claudiu Nica (PSD)
- Area: 59.1 km^{2} (22.8 sq mi)
- Elevation: 97 m (318 ft)
- Population (2021-12-01): 15,178
  - Density: 257/km^{2} (665/sq mi)
- Time zone: UTC+02:00 (EET)
  - Summer (DST): UTC+03:00 (EEST)
- Postal code: 625100
- Area code: (+40) 02 37
- Vehicle reg.: VN
- Website: www.adjud.ro

Adjud (Romanian pronunciation: [adˈʒud]; Hungarian: Egyedhalma) is a city in Vrancea County, Western Moldavia, Romania. It has a population of 15,178 inhabitants (as of 2021). It lies at a railway junction which has a classification yard and a passenger station. Adjud, situated north of the point where the river Trotuș enters the Siret, used to be a marketplace.

The city administers three villages: Adjudu Vechi, Burcioaia, and Șișcani.

== Geography ==
Adjud is situated on a plain and is surrounded by hills up to a height of 400 m (1,300 ft) at the foot of the Vrancea Mountains, a mountain range in the Curvature Carpathians. The average altitude of the town is 100 m (330 ft) above sea level. The surrounding land is favorable for agriculture.

Geological research findings show the city's subsoil having layers of gravel and sand Levantine and Quaternary, forming significant hydrological aquifers deposits fed by the Trotuș and Siret rivers and direct rainfalls.

== Climate ==
The climate is temperate with annual average temperature of 8–10 °C (50 °F) and an average rainfall of 500 mm / m a year. It is characterized by prevailing northwinds with winds from the south and south-east in the hot season. Due to its location at the junction of the provinces Moldavia, Wallachia, and Transylvania, it has been an important road and railway junction since ancient times. The town's area was of 5,911 ha (14,610 acres) in 1997, out of which 105 ha (260 acres) was covered by buildings and yards.

Climate data for Adjud (elevation 101m, 2014–2026 normals, extremes 1961–present)
Month	Jan	Feb	Mar	Apr	May	Jun	Jul	Aug	Sep	Oct	Nov	Dec	Year
Record high °C (°F)	20.2 (68.4)	22.9 (73.2)	29.0 (84.2)	32.7 (90.9)	35.0 (95.0)	37.5 (99.5)	39.1 (102.4)	40.6 (105.1)	35.6 (96.1)	31.9 (89.4)	25.6 (78.1)	19.0 (66.2)	40.6 (105.1)
Mean maximum °C (°F)	12.5 (54.5)	16.7 (62.1)	21.9 (71.4)	26.6 (79.9)	30.2 (86.4)	34.4 (93.9)	35.8 (96.4)	35.7 (96.3)	32.7 (90.9)	25.9 (78.6)	19.4 (66.9)	13.8 (56.8)	36.5 (97.7)
Mean daily maximum °C (°F)	3.5 (38.3)	6.6 (43.9)	12.1 (53.8)	17.7 (63.9)	23.0 (73.4)	28.2 (82.8)	30.1 (86.2)	30.5 (86.9)	25.2 (77.4)	17.6 (63.7)	10.0 (50.0)	5.1 (41.2)	17.4 (63.3)
Daily mean °C (°F)	−0.1 (31.8)	2.4 (36.3)	6.7 (44.1)	11.5 (52.7)	16.7 (62.1)	21.9 (71.4)	23.6 (74.5)	23.5 (74.3)	18.7 (65.7)	11.9 (53.4)	6.3 (43.3)	2.1 (35.8)	12.0 (53.6)
Mean daily minimum °C (°F)	−3.8 (25.2)	−1.7 (28.9)	1.3 (34.3)	5.3 (41.5)	10.4 (50.7)	15.6 (60.1)	17.0 (62.6)	16.6 (61.9)	12.2 (54.0)	6.2 (43.2)	2.6 (36.7)	−0.9 (30.4)	6.7 (44.1)
Mean minimum °C (°F)	−13.9 (7.0)	−9.9 (14.2)	−5.4 (22.3)	−2.0 (28.4)	4.0 (39.2)	9.9 (49.8)	12.0 (53.6)	11.7 (53.1)	4.9 (40.8)	−0.8 (30.6)	−4.5 (23.9)	−7.5 (18.5)	−14.6 (5.7)
Record low °C (°F)	−29.0 (−20.2)	−25.6 (−14.1)	−21.6 (−6.9)	−5.5 (22.1)	−3.5 (25.7)	1.9 (35.4)	8.0 (46.4)	5.2 (41.4)	−4.9 (23.2)	−8.0 (17.6)	−23.0 (−9.4)	−19.9 (−3.8)	−29.0 (−20.2)
Average precipitation mm (inches)	16.6 (0.65)	16.7 (0.66)	32.3 (1.27)	36.1 (1.42)	50.6 (1.99)	80.5 (3.17)	62.6 (2.46)	49.8 (1.96)	34.4 (1.35)	54.3 (2.14)	42.1 (1.66)	29.7 (1.17)	504.7 (19.87)
Average precipitation days (≥ 1.0 mm)	3.7	3.0	4.8	5.8	7.7	7.4	7.2	4.3	4.7	4.8	5.2	4.8	63.4
Source 1: Meteomanz (2014-2026)
Source 2: uaiasi.ro (1961-1997)

== History ==
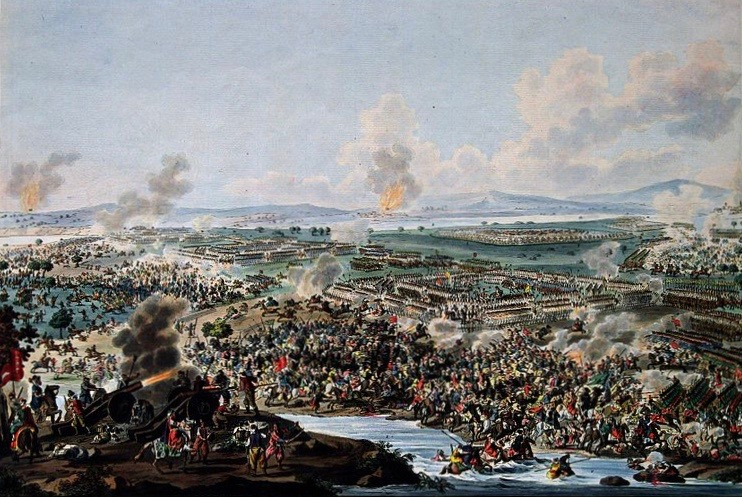
Battle of Adjud, 14 October 1788, during the Russo-Turkish War (1787–1792)

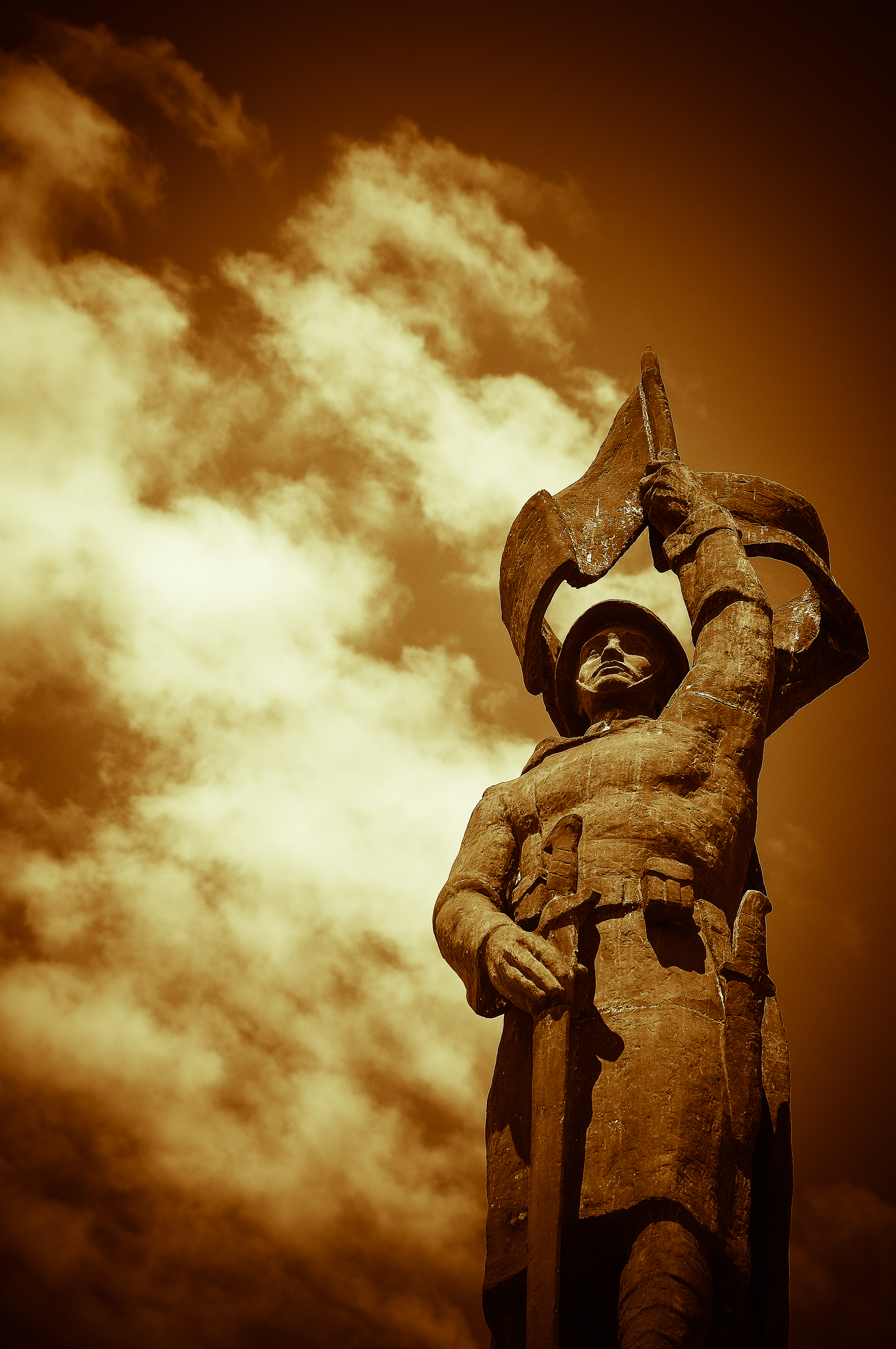
World War I monument

In the northern part of the town a settlement from the Bronze Age was discovered, which dates roughly from the second millennium BC and belongs to Monteoru culture. Geto-Dacian vestiges of 5th century BC were also found here.

The first mention of the town is made by its Hungarian name Egyedhalma ("in oppido nostro Egydhalm” meaning "in our city Gilles' Hill") in a Latin language document from 1433, where Iliaș of Moldavia granted commercial privileges to Transylvanian Saxon merchants. The Romanian name of Adjud derives from the Hungarian one. The original name supports the idea that the town was established by Hungarian Csángós settled in Moldavia as part of a systematic Hungarian imperial policy to settle Hungarian and partly German population in places of strategic economic, commercial and military importance with the task to control and defend the eastern frontier of Hungary.

The Battle of Adjud occurred here on 14 October 1788, during the Russo-Turkish War (1787–1792), pitting the armies of the Russian Empire and the Habsburg monarchy (under the command of field marshal Baron Spleny von Mihald) against those of the Ottoman Empire.

Adjud was declared a city in 1948. In 1950 it became the residence of Adjud district from Putna Region, then (after 1952) from Bârlad Region and (after 1956) from the Bacău Region. In 1968, it became a city of Vrancea County, while in 2000 Adjud was declared a municipality.

== Population ==
Historical population
Year	Pop.	±%
1930	6,748	—
1948	4,028	−40.3%
1956	6,119	+51.9%
1966	8,347	+36.4%
1977	12,501	+49.8%
1992	20,346	+62.8%
2002	20,776	+2.1%
2011	14,670	−29.4%
2021	15,178	+3.5%
Source: Census data

At the 2021 census, Adjud had a population of 15,178. According to the 2011 census, the city had a population of 14,670, of which 13,734 (93.62%) were Romanians, and 915 (6.23%) Roma. As to religious makeup, most respondents were of the Orthodox religion (94.92%). The second largest community was the Roman Catholic one, 2.32% of the population. Pentecostals totaled 1.33%, while other denominations were represented by less than 1%.

== Road ==
Adjud municipality is crossed by national road DN2 (part of European route E85) for a length of 11 km (6.8 mi), from km 226 at the Trotuș River bridge up to km 237, running through downtown for a section of 3 km. It is also crossed by the national road DN11A, from the agro-food market towards Onești–Bacău, for a length of 4 km from km 37 + 450 to km 33 + 450. National road DN2 branches out to Adjudu Vechi, while DN11A goes to Bârlad, from km 42 to 46, for a length of 4 km, running in the downtown area for a section of 1.5 km.

== Notable persons ==
- Costel Alexe (born 1983), politician
- Gheorghe Balș (1868–1934), engineer and art historian
- Dan Botta (1907–1958), poet, essayist
- Emil Botta (1911–1977), poet, writer and actor, brother of Dan Botta
- Minodora Cliveti (born 1955), politician
- Elena Dan (1967–1996), opera singer
- Ion Dichiseanu (1933–2021), actor
- Angela Gheorghiu (born 1965), soprano
- Nelly Miricioiu (born 1952), soprano
- Gheorghe Naghi (1932–2019), film director
- Alexandru Novac (born 1997), athlete
- Gelu Radu (born 1957), weightlifter
