= Haydée =

Opera by Daniel Auber

- Opéra comique by Daniel Auber
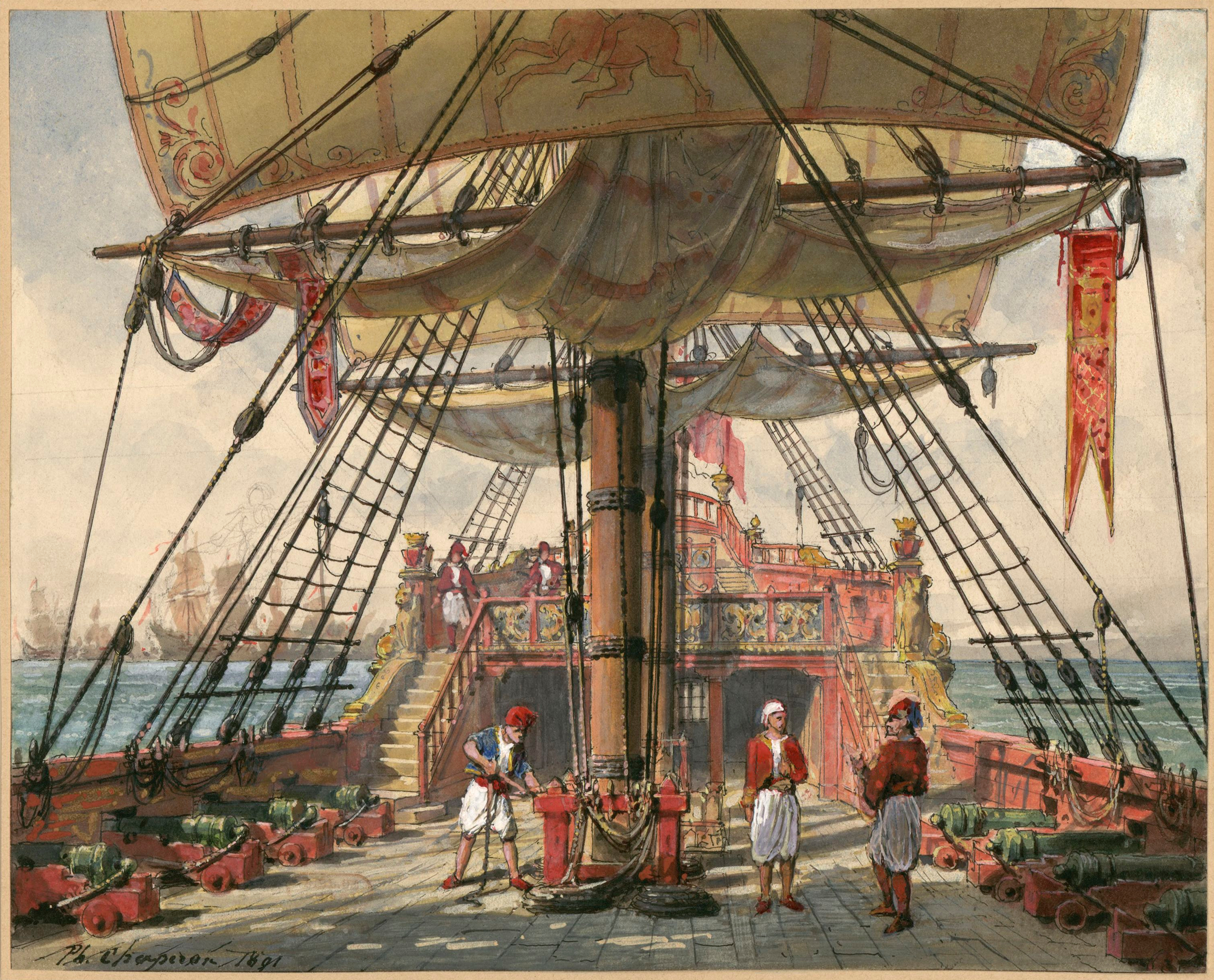
- Set design for Act II by Philippe Chaperon
- Librettist: Eugène Scribe
- Language: French
- Based on: Prosper Mérimée's La Partie de trictrac
- Premiere: 28 December 1847; Salle Favart, Paris

Haydée, ou Le secret is an opéra comique by the French composer Daniel Auber, first performed by the Théâtre Royal de l'Opéra-Comique at the Salle Favart in Paris on 28 December 1847. The libretto (in three acts) is by Auber's regular collaborator, Eugène Scribe and is based on a short story by Prosper Mérimée, La Partie de trictrac (1830).

The opera was performed regularly by the Opéra-Comique up to the end of the 19th century, achieving over 520 performances there.

== Roles ==
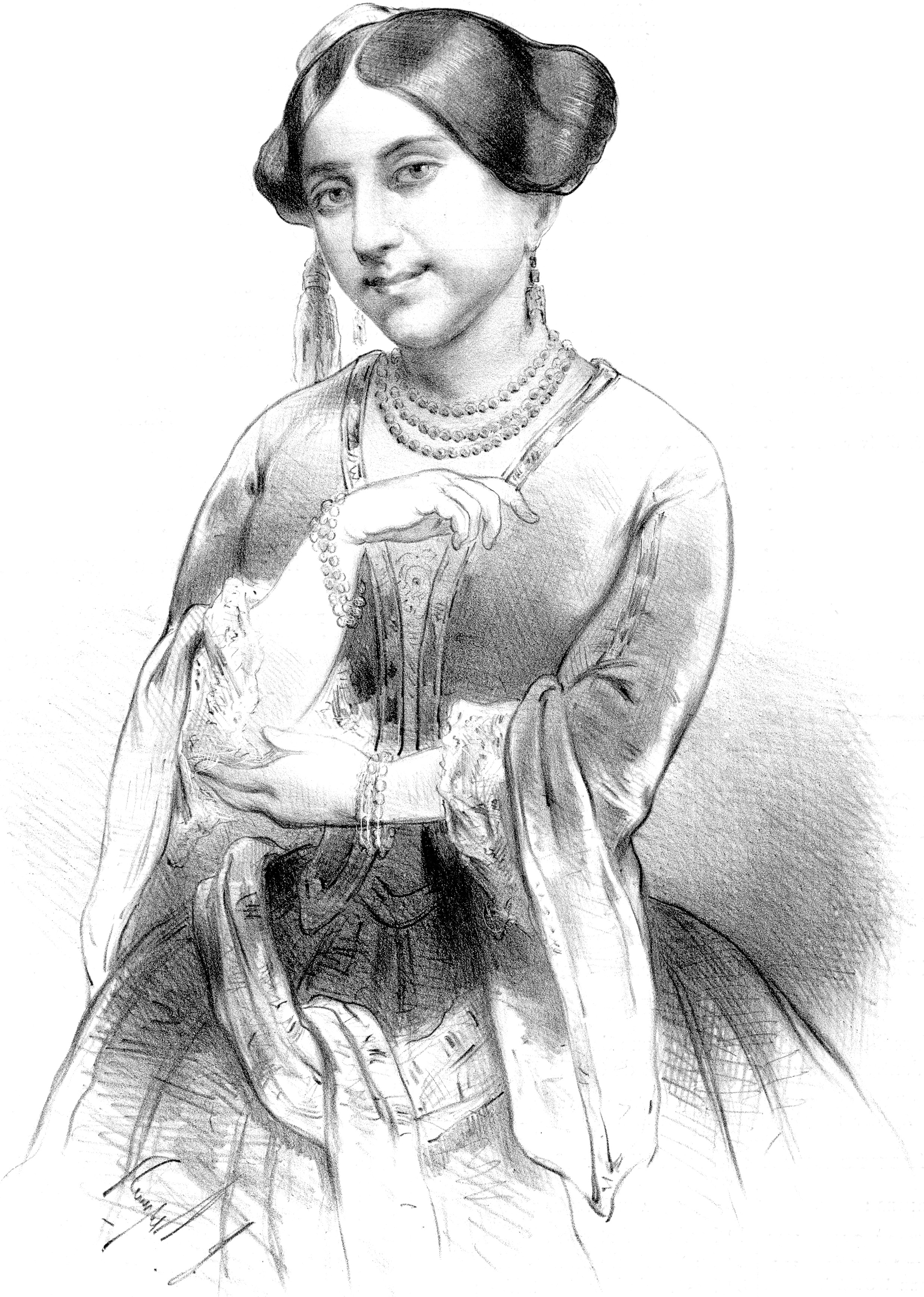
Anne-Benoîte-Louise Lavoye as Haydée

Role	Voice type	Premiere Cast, 28 December 1847 (Conductor: Théodore Labarre)
Andréa Donato	tenor	Marius-Pierre Audran
Doménico	tenor	Edmond-Jules Delaunay-Ricquier
Haydée	soprano	Anne-Benoîte-Louise Lavoye
Lorédan Grimani	tenor	Gustave-Hippolyte Roger
Malipieri	bass	Léonard Hermann-Léon
Rafaela	soprano	Sophie Grimm

== Synopsis ==
The story is set during the 16th-century wars between the Republic of Venice and the Ottoman Empire and concerns a Venetian admiral, Lorédan, who can never forgive himself for once having cheated at dice. The title character is a Cypriot slave girl; her name is taken from Haidée, the pirate king's daughter, in Byron's poem Don Juan.

Lorédan is the commander of a naval fleet, with a ward named Rafaela, and a slave girl named Haydée, who is deeply in love with him. He has just had Andrea, a naval captain, pledge himself to his service. Lorédan's second-in-command is Malipieri, a spy for the Council of Ten. Malipieri overhears Lorédan talking in his sleep about a great crime in his past: in his youth, he cheated at dice in order to win the fortune of the Venetian senator Donato, who then killed himself. Racked with guilt, he has spent the rest of his life seeking the senator's son, to try and make amends.

After Andrea captures a Turkish ship, Malipieri attempts to steal his prize money for having done so, but Lorédan overrules him. Malipieri darkly threatens to expose Lorédan's crime, demanding Haydée's hand in marriage in order to keep silent, and reveals she is really a princess. Haydée, being deeply in love with Lorédan, offers to do this to save him. This proves deeply troubling.... until a messenger reveals that Andrea killed Malipieri in a duel, and that Andrea is the son of Senator Donato. Andrea and Lorédan reconcile, Lorédan marries Haydée; Andrea marries Lorédan's daughter, Rafaela; and Lorédan becomes Doge of Venice.

== Recordings ==
- Isabelle Philippe (Haydée); Bruno Comparetti (Lorédan Grimani); Paul Medioni (Malipieri); Anne Sophie Schmidt (Rafaela); Mathias Vidal (Andréa Donato); Stéphane Malbec-Garcia (Doménico); Michael Swiereczewski (conductor); Théâtre Impérial de Compiègne; Pierre Jourdan (artistic director); André Brasilier (scenery); Jean-Pierre Capeyron (costumes); Thierry Alexandre (lighting). Kultur Video D4244 (Region 1, NTSC, 137 min, 16:9 anamorphic), 2005.
