= Ruggero Raimondi =

Italian operatic bass-baritone (born 1941)

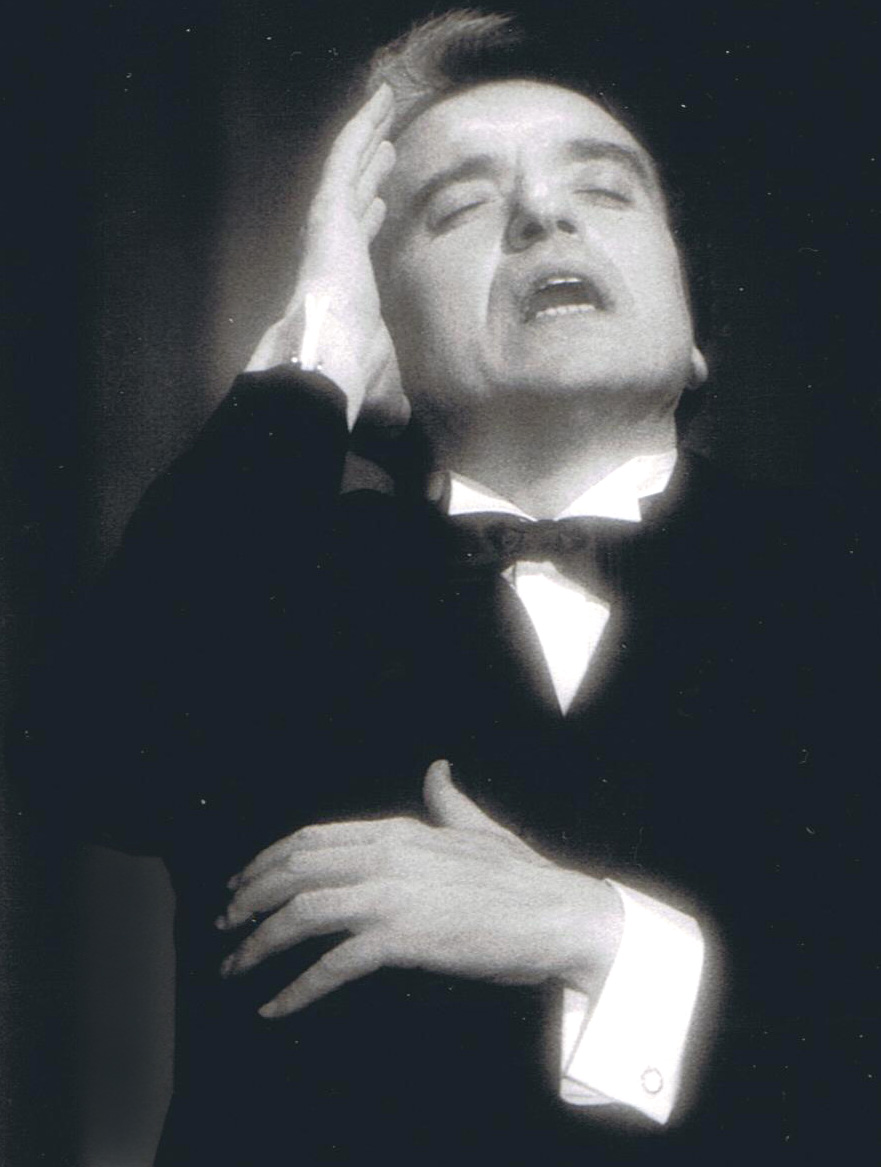
Raimondi in concert, 1982

Ruggero Raimondi (born 3 October 1941) is an Italian bass-baritone opera singer who has also appeared in motion pictures.

== Life and career ==
=== Early training and career ===
Ruggero Raimondi was born in Bologna, Italy, during World War II. His voice matured early into its adult timbre, and at the age of 15, he auditioned for conductor Francesco Molinari-Pradelli, who encouraged him to pursue an operatic career. He began vocal studies with Ettore Campogalliani, and was accepted at age 16 as a student at the Giuseppe Verdi Conservatory in Milan. He then continued his studies in Rome, under the guidance of Teresa Pediconi and Armando Piervenanzi.

After having won the National Competition for young opera singers in Spoleto, he made his debut in the same city in the role of Colline in La bohème in the Festival dei Due Mondi. Subsequently, an opportunity arose for him at the Teatro dell'Opera in Rome when he was called upon to substitute in the role of Procida in Giuseppe Verdi's I vespri siciliani, and he received enormous success from the public and the critics. The young singer was very shy and stiff at first, but his early directors helped him, and he was soon an accomplished opera actor.

=== Opera, film and television ===
Raimondi's career soon extended to the major opera houses in Italy, such as La Fenice in Venice, the Teatro Regio in Turin, Teatro Comunale in Florence and abroad, beginning with the Glyndebourne Festival (Don Giovanni in 1969). His La Scala debut was as Timur in Turandot in 1968, his Metropolitan Opera debut was as Silva in Ernani in 1970, and his Covent Garden debut was as Fiesco in Simon Boccanegra in 1972. In 1975, he made his Paris Opera debut as Procida, followed by the title role in Boris Godunov, and his Salzburg Festival debut in 1980 as the King in Aida (opposite Mirella Freni as Aida, Piero Cappuccilli as Amonasro, and Jose Carreras as Radames, with Karajan conducting). In 1986, he first directed a production of Don Giovanni, and decided to continue his career as a director as well.

Raimondi is especially well-known for his Rossini and Mozart roles, although he has also sung a lot of other bass roles in various repertories. Some of his most important roles have been King Philip in Verdi's Don Carlos; Fiesco; the title roles in Boris Godunov (including the Andrzej Żuławski film) and Attila; Silva; Escamillo in Bizet's Carmen (including the Francesco Rosi film, 1984, with Plácido Domingo and Julia Migenes); the title role in Don Giovanni (including the Joseph Losey film, 1979); Count Almaviva in The Marriage of Figaro; and Don Alfonso in Così fan tutte; the title role in Don Quichotte by Massenet; and Scarpia in a recording of Tosca later filmed live from Rome, with Plácido Domingo and Catherine Malfitano, conducted by Zubin Mehta. He also made the television film Six Characters in Search of a Singer. In 2008, Raimondi made his television debut in the mini-series Le Sanglot des anges on French TV, in which he played the role of an Italian opera singer. In July 2011 he played the role of Pagano in Verdi's I Lombardi alla prima crociata on the rooftop of Milan Cathedral. The concert was organized by the Veneranda Fabbrica del Duomo di Milano to celebrate the 150th anniversary of Italian unification.

== Recordings ==
=== Audio recordings ===
Verdi Rigoletto (Molinari Pradelli - MacNeil, Grist, Gedda Rome Opera) EMI 1968 Verdi Don Carlo (Guilini- Caballe, Domingo, Milnes, Verret) EMI 1970 Verdi Simon Boccanegra (Levine, Cappuccilli, Domingo, Ricciarelli) RCA 1973 Verdi I Vespri Siciliani (Levine, Milnes, Domingo, Arroyo) RCA 1974 Verdi Macbeth (Multi, Milnes, Cossotto, Carreras) EMI 1976

- Mozart: Don Giovanni | Sony | 1978
- Mozart: Le nozze di Figaro | Decca | 1985
- Mussorgsky: Boris Godunov | Erato | 1989
- Puccini: Turandot | Deutsche Grammophon | 1981
- Puccini: Tosca | Deutsche Grammophon | 1979
- Rossini: Il barbiere di Siviglia | Deutsche Grammophon | 1993
- Rossini: Il barbiere di Siviglia | EMI | 1973–74
- Rossini: Il barbiere di Siviglia (w/bonus DVD) DVD | Decca | 1993
- Rossini: Il viaggio a Reims | Deutsche Grammophon | 1984
- Rossini: La Cenerentola| Decca | 1987
- Rossini: L'italiana in Algeri | Deutsche Grammophon | 1989
- Verdi: Aida | Deutsche Grammophon | 1981
- Verdi: I vespri siciliani | RCA Red Seal | 1973
- Verdi: Attila | Philips | 1972
- Verdi: Don Carlos | Deutsche Grammophon | 1985
- Verdi: Un ballo in maschera | Deutsche Grammophon | 1980
- Verdi: I masnadieri | Phillips | 1975

=== TV ===
- 2008 : Le Sanglot des Anges, mini series directed by Jacques Otmezguine
- 2005 : Così fan tutte staged by Patrice Chéreau
- 2001 : Il turco in Italia with Cecilia Bartoli at Zürich Opera House
- 1992 : Glyndebourne Festival Opera: A Gala Evening, directed by Christopher Swann
- 1992 : Tosca: in the settings and at the times of Tosca, directed by Brian Large (with Malfitano and Domingo)
- 1992 : Le nozze di Figaro, directed by Brian Large
- 1991 : José Carreras and Friends: Opera Recital
- 1985 : Faust staged by Ken Russell at the Vienna State Opera
- 1983 : The Metropolitan Opera Centennial Gala Directed by Kirk Browning
- 1983 : Ernani Directed by Kirk Browning (with Milnes and Pavarotti)
- 1982 : Verdi's Messa da Requiem
- 1981 : Six personnages en quête d'un chanteur by Maurice Béjart
- 1980 : Boris Godunov staged by Joseph Losey at Opéra National de Paris

== Filmography ==
- 2019 : Beaux-parents by Héctor Cabello Reyes
- 2001 : Tosca by Benoît Jacquot, with Angela Gheorghiu & Roberto Alagna
- 1997 : Les Couleurs du diable by Alain Jessua
- 1989 : Boris Godunov by Andrzej Żuławski
- 1984 : Carmen by Francesco Rosi, with Plácido Domingo
- 1983 : La vie est un roman by Alain Resnais
- 1982 : La Truite by Joseph Losey
- 1979 : Don Giovanni by Joseph Losey, with José van Dam, Kiri Te Kanawa

== Honours ==
- Monaco: Commander of the Order of Cultural Merit (November 1999)

== See also ==
- Debussy: Pelléas et Mélisande (Herbert von Karajan recording)
