= Karine Babajanyan =

Armenian operatic soprano

Karine Babajanyan (Armenian: Կարինե Բաբաջանյան) is an Armenian operatic soprano.

== Life ==
Babajanyan was born in Yerevan. Her musical education began at the age of 6. She first learned to play the piano and in 1987 graduated from the Romanos Melikyan Music College in Yerevan as a piano teacher and piano accompanist. 6 years later a diploma as choirmaster followed at the Komitas State Conservatory of Yerevan. There she also studied singing with Tatevik Sazandaryan, and thus expanded her musical education to include a degree as an opera and concert singer as well as a singing teacher. In 1998 she completed her studies in solo singing with distinction. She completed her vocal training with Mirella Parutto and Dunja Vejzovic.

From 1996 to 1999 Babajanyan was first engaged at the National Theatre in Yerevan. In 1999 she moved her professional focus to Germany, which has since become her second home. Her first engagements led her to the Theater Koblenz and the Bielefeld Opera, as a guest to the Komische Oper Berlin, the Staatsoper Hannover and the Aalto Theater Essen. From 2003 to 2011 she was a member of the ensemble Staatstheater Stuttgart. Since 2011 she has been working as a freelance artist.

Her activity as a solo and concert singer led Babajanyan to the Grand Théâtre de Genève, the Müpa Budapest, Det Kongelige Teater in Kopenhagen, the National Centre for Performing Arts in Beijing, the Teatro Politeama, Palermo, the Semperoper Dresden, the Deutsche Oper am Rhein, the Opernhaus Zürich, the Staatsoper Berlin, the Vlaamse Opera in Antwerp, the Finnish National Opera and Ballet in Helsinki, the New Israeli Opera in Tel Aviv, the New National Theatre in Tokio, the Opernhaus Graz, the Palacio de Bellas Artes in Mexico-city, the Cologne Opera, the Nationaltheater Mannheim, the Stadttheater Bern, the Hessisches Staatstheater Wiesbaden, the Staatsoper Hamburg, the Theater Basel, the Oper Frankfurt and the Dorset Opera.

She was also engaged by the Bregenzer Festspiele, the Festspielhaus Baden-Baden, the Ruhrtriennale, the Schleswig-Holstein Musik Festival, the Rheingau Musik Festival, the Prague Autumn International Music Festival, the Nuit Blanche Reggio Calabria, the DomStufen-Festspiele in Erfurt and the International Opera Festival Miskolc in Hungary.

A highlight of her career in 2008 was her appearance as Puccini's Tosca at the Bregenz Festival in the James Bond film Quantum of Solace with Daniel Craig as James Bond.

Babajanyan worked with the conductors Daniel Oren, Carlo Rizzi, Nicola Luisotti, Robin Ticciati, Lothar Zagrosek, Muhai Tang, Stefan Soltesz, Alexander Joel, Helmuth Rilling, Piergiorgio Morandi, José Cura, Jonathan Nott, Carlo Montanaro, Julian Kovatchev and Axel Kober and with the film directors Werner Schroeter, Peter Konwitschny, Philipp Himmelmann, Graham Vick, Jossi Wieler, Tatjana Gürbaca, Monique Wagemakers and Dietrich Hilsdorf.

Her repertoire includes the great soprano roles with Mozart (Elettra, Elvira, Contessa, Fiordiligi) as well as various Italian roles. (Mimi, Cio-Cio-San, Manon Lescaut, Liù, Suor Angelica, Leonora in Il trovatore, Elisabetta in Don Carlo, Amelia in Un ballo in maschera, Leonora in La forza del destino, Desdemona, Maddalena in Andrea Chénier, Nedda, Norma), but also Rachel from Halévy's La Juive, Janáček's Jenůfa, Tatjana from Tchaikowsky's Eugene Onegin and Maria from Tchaikowsky's Mazeppa.

Her signature role is Cio-Cio-San in Puccini's Madama Butterfly that she portrayed in 15 productions.

At the Staatsoper Stuttgart she sang the role of Carmen. She also made excursions into the German repertory with Wagner and Strauss. At the end of September 2014 she had her premiere as Ariadne in Strauss' Ariadne auf Naxos at the Deutsche Oper am Rhein in Düsseldorf.

In October 2015 Babajanyan made her debut as Elena in a new production of Mefistofele alongside Joseph Calleja and René Pape at the Bayerische Staatsoper .

== Prizes and awards ==
- 1st prize in the Avetik Isahakyan Singing Competition 1996.
- 1st prize at the Austrian-German Singing Competition 1997
- Special prize at the "Competizione Dell' Opera" in Hamburg 1998
- Nomination "Best Young Singer" of the year 2001 by the magazine Opernwelt for Madama Butterfly and Manon Lescaut at the Komische Oper Berlin
- Nomination "Best Singer" of the year 2003 at the Critics' Survey NRW for Madama Butterfly and Jenufa at the Theater Bielefeld
- Awarded with the Komitas Order as "Cultural Ambassador of Armenia in the World" by the Diaspora ministry in Armenia

== Radio and television broadcasts ==
- 2003 Russian Operetta - WDR Live broadcast from the Kölner Philharmonie
- 2013 Ottorino Respighi's Il Tramonto with the Württemberg Chamber Orchestra Heilbronn - SWR broadcast
- 2014 Mozart's Don Giovanni – Broadcast from the Opera Vlaanderen on Belgian Television

== Discography ==
- 2008: Karine Babajanyan – Puccini-Arien, Audio-CD, EMI Classics 2677312
