= Diaspora ministry =

A ministry of the diaspora or ministry of expatriates is any governmental agency which is charged with interacting with the nation's emigrants and expatriates in other states.

In countries such as Israel and Syria, the diaspora portfolio is combined with some other portfolio, such as Foreign Affairs or Information, in order to imbue the office with a secondary, diaspora-specific diplomatic role.

== List ==
- Armenia - Ministry of Diaspora, now High Commissioner for Diaspora Affairs (Armenia)
- Azerbaijan - State Committee on Work with Diaspora
- Bangladesh - Ministry of Expatriates
- Canada - Global Affairs Canada
- China - Overseas Chinese Affairs Office
- Georgia - State Ministry on Diaspora Affairs
- Greece - Deputy Minister for Diaspora Greeks
- India - Ministry of Overseas Indian Affairs
- Ireland - Minister for Diaspora Affairs
- Israel - Information and Diaspora Ministry
- Mexico - Institute for Mexicans Abroad
- Montenegro - Ministry of Diaspora Affairs
- Kenya - Ministry of Foreign and Diaspora Affairs
- Romania - Ministry for the Romanians Abroad
- Serbia - Ministry of Religion and Diaspora
- Syria - Minister of Foreign Affairs and Expatriates
- Taiwan - Overseas Community Affairs Council
- Vietnam - Ministry of Foreign Affairs
