= David Alagna =

French stage director and composer

David Alagna (born in Paris, 1975) is a French stage director and composer.

As a composer he is best known for his opera Le Dernier jour d'un condamné based on the story by Victor Hugo, to a libretto by his brother Frédérico Alagna, himself, and by his older brother Roberto Alagna.
