= Marius et Fanny =

Marius et Fanny is an opera (opéra comique) in two acts composed by Vladimir Cosma. The libretto by Michel Lengliney, Jean-Pierre Lang, Michel Rivegauche, Antoine Chalamel, Michel Arbatz and Vladimir Cosma is based on Marcel Pagnol's stage and film trilogy Marius, Fanny and César (known as the Trilogie marseillaise). The opera premiered on 4 September 2007 at the Opéra de Marseille with Roberto Alagna and Angela Gheorghiu in the title roles.

== Roles ==
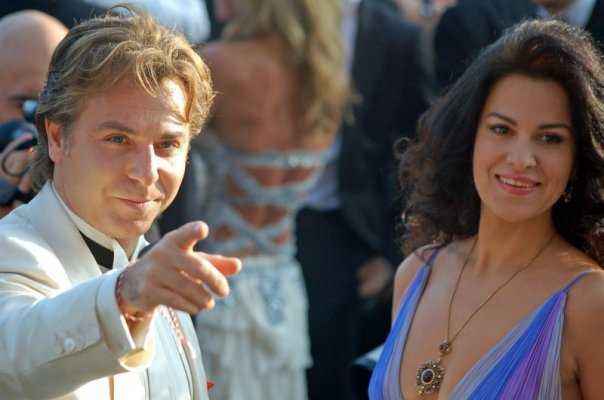
Roberto Alagna and Angela Gheorghiu who created the roles of Marius and Fanny at the world premiere

Role	Voice type	Premiere cast, 4 September 2007 Conductor: Jacques Lacombe
Marius	tenor	Roberto Alagna
Fanny	soprano	Angela Gheorghiu
César, Marius's father	bass-baritone	Jean-Philippe Lafont
Honorine, Fanny's mother	soprano	Isabelle Vernet
Honoré Panisse, a sail merchant and César's best friend	baritone	Marc Barrard
Monsieur Brun. a customs official from Lyon	tenor	Bruno Comparetti
Escartefigue, a ferry captain	tenor	Éric Huchet
Piquoiseau, an old sailor turned beggar	bass-baritone	Antoine Garcin
César's bar clients, soubrettes, port workers

== Synopsis ==
Setting: The Old Port of Marseille in the 1930s

Marius works in his father's bar at the port, but has dreams of becoming a sailor. His childhood sweetheart, Fanny, works in her mother's shellfish stall at the port. When Fanny becomes pregnant with Marius's child, their parents urge the young couple to marry. After their engagement, Fanny realizing his disappointment, encourages him to follow his dream of going to sea. Marius abandons her, and she marries her elderly admirer, Honoré Panisse, to provide a father for her baby. When Marius returns from sea and finds Fanny married, he tries to win her back, but to no avail. despite the fact that she still loves him. Their son, Césariot, is being raised as Panisse's legitimate child, and in the intervening years, Fanny has been transformed into "the perfect bourgeois wife".

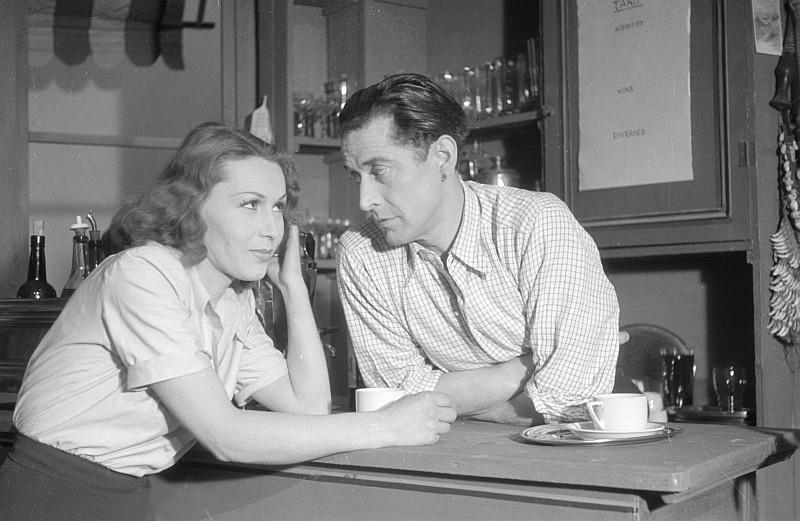
Scene from Zum goldenen Anker, a 1946 German stage adaptation of Pagnol's Trilogie marseillaise

== Other adaptations of Pagnol's Trilogie marseillaise ==
- The 1938 film Port of Seven Seas with screenplay by Preston Sturges
- The 1946 German-language stage play Zum goldenen Anker (The Golden Anchor) directed by Boleslaw Barlog with music by Leo Spies
- The 1954 Broadway musical Fanny with a book by S. N. Behrman and Joshua Logan and songs by Harold Rome
- The 1958 German radio play Zum goldenen Anker, adapted by Walter Matthias Diggelmann
- The 1961 film Fanny based on Behrman and Logan's musical (excising Rome's score)
- The 2013 remake of the entire film trilogy, Marius, Fanny, and César, directed by Daniel Auteuil
