= Petrika Ionesco =

French stage director and playwright (born 1946)

Petrika Ionesco (born Petrică Ionescu; 13 October 1946) is a Romanian-born French stage director, scenic designer and playwright.

== Life and career ==
In 1970 he graduated from the "Ion Luca Caragiale" Theatrical Arts Academy in Bucharest, Communist Romania, and in the same year he defected while touring Italy.

After living in France for about a year, he went to the USA in 1971 (at the invitation of stage director Ellen Stewart), and then hitchhiked around the world before returning to Paris. There he met Fernando Arrabal, who invited him to London to stage his play Et ils passèrent des menottes aux fleurs ("And They Put Handcuffs on the Flowers").

He has staged plays in France, Great Britain, Germany, Ireland, Romania, Switzerland, etc. Although he mainly works for the theatre stage, he has also staged shows at Disneyland.

He became a French citizen in 1976. He made the set of Nureyev's Cinderella at the Opéra de Paris in 2008.

== Filmography ==
- Cinderella (2007), stage design

== Plays ==
- L’Atlantide
- L’enfance de Vladimir Kobalt

== Publications ==
- Ionesco, Petrika (14 April 2024). L'apocalypse subtile d'Oscar (in French). Le Lys Bleu Éditions. ISBN 979-10-422-2577-3.
