= Angela Gheorghiu =

Romanian operatic soprano (born 1965)

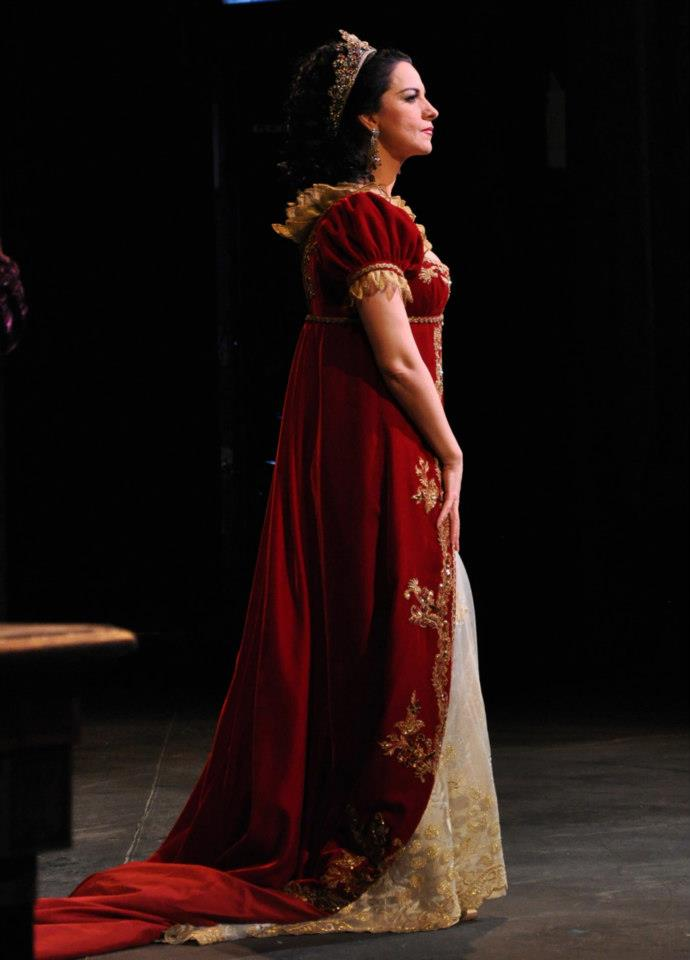
- Gheorghiu as Floria Tosca at San Francisco Opera, November 2012
- Born: Angela Burlacu; 7 September 1965 (age 61); Adjud, Romania
- Education: National University of Music Bucharest
- Occupation: Operatic soprano
- Years active: 1990–present
- Spouses: Andrei Gheorghiu (div. 1994) Roberto Alagna (m. 1996; div. 2013)
- Children: 1
- Website: www.angelagheorghiu.com

Angela Gheorghiu (Romanian: [anˈdʒela ɡe̯orˈɡi.u]; née Burlacu; born 7 September 1965) is a Romanian operatic soprano, especially known for her performances in the operas of Puccini and Verdi, widely recognised by critics and opera lovers as one of the greatest sopranos of all time.

Embarking her career in 1990, she made her Royal Opera House and Vienna State Opera debuts in 1992, followed by New York's Metropolitan Opera debut in 1993. She was catapulted to international stardom after starring as Violetta in Verdi's La traviata at Covent Garden in 1994. Her signature roles include, alongside Violetta in La traviata, Mimì in La bohème, Magda in La rondine, the title roles in Tosca and Adriana Lecouvreur. She had performed frequently with French tenor Roberto Alagna, whom she first met in 1992 and married in 1996, in concerts and opera productions until their eventual divorce in 2013. They were widely celebrated as opera’s "golden couple".

Her voice is described as "the most instantly recognizable and interesting soprano voice of our time. A liquid instrument of great lyrical beauty with gleaming spun-gold high notes, but a dark, vibrant contralto range, reminiscent of Maria Callas.", and she is considered "the world's most glamorous opera star".

She has made substantial discography (Angela Gheorghiu discography) primarily with EMI Classics (absorbed into Warner Classics in 2013) and Decca, and holds several Gramophone Awards and honorary doctorates.

== Early life and family ==
Angela Burlacu was born in Adjud, Romania, to a seamstress mother and train driver father. Along with her sister Elena, she sang opera music from an early age. At age 14, she began to study singing at the Music High School in Bucharest and then at the National University of Music Bucharest, under Mia Barbu, her only singing teacher and vocal mentor. Her graduation in 1990 followed the overthrow of Nicolae Ceaușescu the previous year, enabling her to seek an international career immediately. Her graduation exam took place at the Cluj-Napoca Romanian National Opera as Mimì in La bohème in 1990, the same year she won third prize in the Belvedere International Singing Competition.

In 1996, Elena died in a car crash. Angela's parents then separated and her father became a monk, living in a monastery in Mount Athos. Four years later, after Elena's surgeon husband, Andrei Dan, died, Angela adopted their daughter, Ioana, who studied in the University of Kent and has lived in London since. She decided not to have a child of her own in fear of the probable voice change after pregnancy and that raising Ioana was already a satisfying experience for her.

== Career ==
=== Early career (1991–2002) ===
Gheorghiu made her international debut at the Theater Basel in 1991, performing Adina in L'elisir d'amore. In 1992, she debuted at the Royal Opera, London in one performance as Zerlina in Don Giovanni opposite Bryn Terfel as Masetto, and then her official debut as Mimì in La bohème. In the same year, she debuted at the Vienna State Opera in the role of Adina, and was engaged as Nannetta in Falstaff in the same season. She became a regular guest singer at the Royal Opera, featuring in consecutive seasons in various opera productions such as Puccini's Turandot (Liù), Don Giovanni (Zerlina), Carmen (Micaëla), L'elisir d'amore (Adina), Roméo et Juliette (Juliette), The Tales of Hoffmann (Antonia). In 1994, she starred in the premiere of a new production of Massenet's Chérubin. In November 1994, she debuted as Violetta in Richard Eyre's new production of La traviata conducted by Georg Solti at the Royal Opera House. The sensation prompted BBC Two to clear its regular schedule on 8 December to broadcast the live performance, which led her to international stardom.

In 1993, she made her Metropolitan Opera debut in La bohème. Since then, she has returned to the company for La bohème, Puccini's Turandot, Carmen, L'elisir d'amore, Roméo et Juliette. In 1999, she was featured in Roméo et Juliette at the Lyric Opera of Chicago, and in Mascagni's L'amico Fritz as Suzel at the Opéra de Monte-Carlo. She was featured in Michael Jackson's MJ & Friends in Munich. Later in the year, she sang at the Richard Tucker Opera Gala, and performed at the reopening of the Covent Garden Royal Opera House. In 2001, she performed in La Fenice's reopening concert, "Concert in Honour of the President of the Republic" at the Teatro Malibran. She also made guest appearances at the Paris Opera (Micaëla, Violetta, Mimì) and Salzburg Festival (Violetta, Juliette). Gheorghiu was additionally cast in two opera films: Tosca (2001; directed by Benoît Jacquot) as the title role, and Roméo et Juliette (2002; directed by Barbara Willis Sweete) as Juliette.

=== Mid–career ===
Gheorghiu starred in as Magda in Nicolas Joel's new production of La rondine, which premiered on 7 May 2002, at the London Royal Opera. She returned to the production in the London revival in 2004, at her San Francisco Opera debut in November 2007, and the Met premiere in the 2008/09 season, which was the company's first performance of the opera since 1936.

In 2002, she sang at the Prom at the Palace, the event that marked the Golden Jubilee of Elizabeth II. She was invited as a performing artist at the 2003 Nobel Peace Prize Concert. In 2005, she sang at the opening the Palau de les Arts Reina Sofía in Valencia, in the presence of Queen Sofía of Spain, and Queen Beatrix's Silver Jubilee Gala in Amsterdam.

In March 2003, Gheorghiu starred in Gounod's Faust as Marguerite at the Metropolitan Opera, but withdrew from final performances citing security concerns due to the Iraq War. In July 2003, she debuted as Nedda in Pagliacci with Plácido Domingo in the title role at the Royal Opera, and then performed in La traviata at the Verona Arena. A soprano with a large range and a dark coloured voice, Gheorghiu is also able to sing spinto soprano roles. In 2006, she sang the complete title role in Tosca on stage for the first time (having previously tried out the role by performing Act 2 only, at the 2005 MET opera gala, with Bryn Terfel. This was in Jonathan Kent's new production at the Royal Opera House, Covent Garden. Her performance was an overall success, although because the famous Zeffirelli 1964 production, which was designed for Maria Callas, was replaced, there was comparison between the Toscas of Gheorghiu and Callas.

She gave performances at the Teatro Regio di Torino, Los Angeles Opera, Deutsche Oper Berlin, Teatro dell'Opera di Roma. In 2007, she made her La Scala opera debut in La traviata conducted by Lorin Maazel, and returned five years later for La bohème.

In the 2007/08 season, she sang in two world premieres: Marius et Fanny at the Opéra de Marseille, and Le Dernier Jour d'un condamné, adapted after the novel of the same name by Hugo and composed by David Alagna, at the Palau de le Arts Reina Sofía.

Gheorghiu continued her appearances at the Met as Violetta in La traviata opposite Jonas Kaufmann in 2006 and 2007; as Amelia in Verdi's Simon Boccanegra in 2007; as Mimì in La bohème in 2008; in the Met Summer Concert in Prospect Park, New York City on 20 June 2008; as Magda in La rondine and Adina in L'elisir d'amore in the 2008/2009 season; and for the 2009/2010 season she appeared as Violetta, replacing her previous engagement as Marie Antoinette in a rare revival of John Corigliano's The Ghosts of Versailles, which was replaced due to the recession.

She took part in the "Divas in Beijing" concert series held during the 2008 Summer Olympics. In October 2008, she performed at the Memorial Concert for Luciano Pavarotti in Petra, where she also performed an unconventional duet of "Là ci darem la mano" from Mozart's Don Giovanni with Sting. She then premiered a new Faust at the Vienna State Opera. In 2009, she was invited to honor Grace Bumbry at the 32nd Annual Kennedy Center Honors, where she performed "Vissi d'arte" from Puccini's Tosca in the presence of Barack Obama.

=== 2010s–present ===
In November 2010, Gheorghiu made her role debut in a new production of Cilea's Adriana Lecouvreur at the Covent Garden Royal Opera House to critical success.

In July 2011, Gheorghiu sang the title role in Tosca at the Royal Opera House conducted by Antonio Pappano which was released on DVD and Blu-ray, and the following September returned there for the revival of Faust, which was broadcast live in cinemas all over the world. In April 2012, she appeared for the first time at the Teatro Colón, Buenos Aires, in a concert of duets with Roberto Alagna.

In 2012, Gheorghiu was invited as the guest performer at the Vienna Opera Ball. Later the year, she was the guest of honour at the London Royal Opera House gala, organized to raise funds for the Royal Opera House Foundation, which was attended by Queen Elizabeth II. In June 2012, she celebrated 20 years since her debut on the stage of the London Royal Opera House, by performing in La bohème with Roberto Alagna. In July 2012, she held her first master class at the Georg Solti Accademia in Castiglione della Pescaia, Italy. She returned for a second master class in 2016. In November 2012 she returned to San Francisco Opera to perform in Puccini's Tosca.

In May 2013, she performed the Romanian national anthem "Deșteaptă-te, române!" on the day the flag of Romania entered the Guinness World Records for the "World's biggest flag". Gheorghiu returned to the Met in December 2014 to perform Mimì in La bohème to great critical acclaim, opposite Michael Fabiano.

In March 2015, she debuted as Charlotte in Massenet's Werther at the Vienna State Opera to great critical acclaim, and then repeated the role in August at the Salzburg Festival in a concert performance. In July, Gheorghiu made her debut at the Verbier Festival with guitarist Miloš Karadaglić in a special recital at The Église.

In October 2015, Gheorghiu appeared in Australia for the first time, performing in two exceptional gala concerts at the Sydney Opera House and at Hamer Hall, Arts Centre Melbourne. Later the month, she performed Tosca at the Metropolitan Opera for the first time in the Luc Bondy production with great reviews. Between her two Tosca performances, she performed at the Richard Tucker Opera Gala, at the David Geffen Hall, which was broadcast on 5 February 2016 on PBS.

In November 2015, Gheorghiu sang at the Elena Obraztsova Opera Ball at the Bolshoi Theatre in Moscow. She co-organized and performed in a humanitarian concert at the Romanian Athenaeum on 29 November to raise funds for the victims of the Colectiv nightclub fire. In December, Gheorghiu sang together with Ramón Vargas and Ghiță Petean in a gala concert at Opéra de Monte-Carlo, from which all proceeds went to the "Fondo Memorial Eduardo Vargas", established in memory of the tenor's deceased son.

In 2016, Gheorghiu returned in the title role of Puccini's Tosca at the Royal Opera House and received great critical acclaim. She was scheduled to appear in 5 performances, but sang in a total of 7 performances. She also returned as Tosca at the Vienna State Opera alongside Jonas Kaufmann and Bryn Terfel in April 2016. In September 2016, Gheorghiu performed in Tosca at the Berlin State Opera with "loud and prolonged ovation".

2017 marked 25 years since Gheorghiu's international debut at the Royal Opera House in 1992 and celebrated her 150 performance with the opera house that made her a star. She performed there in Adriana Lecouvreur in February 2017. On Wednesday 6 September 2017, she performs at the Luciano Pavarotti 10th Anniversary Concert, held at the Verona Arena, singing together with Il Volo, Plácido Domingo and José Carreras, but also with Massimo Ranieri. In October of that year she made her house debut at the Teatro Massimo in Palermo, again as Adriana Lecouvreur.

In February 2021, Angela Gheorghiu performed in aid of New York's Metropolitan Opera (Met) musicians, deprived of their pay because of the Coronavirus-related cancellations of their performances. In September 2021 was released last studio album Juno to Jupiter by Vangelis in which Gheorghiu performed on three compositions representing Greek-Roman Goddess Hera-Juno.

In February 2022, Gheorghiu celebrated her 30th anniversary with the Royal Opera House, reprising Tosca to great critical acclaim.

== Personal life ==
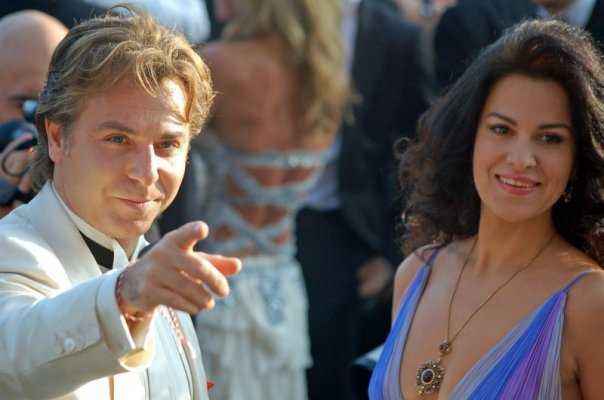
Gheorghiu and Alagna at the 2006 Cannes Film Festival

Gheorghiu met tenor Roberto Alagna, her co-star in La bohème at the Royal Opera, in 1992. At the time, they were both married; she was married to engineer Andrei Gheorghiu. In 1994, Alagna's wife died of cancer. She divorced Gheorghiu in the same year, but retained his surname due to the musical background of the family, with whom she still maintained a good relationship. They were engaged by 1995, and then married during a run of La bohème at the Metropolitan Opera in April 1996 in general manager Joseph Volpe's office by New York City mayor Rudy Giuliani. The couple have sung together often on stage and on studio recordings.

In a 2009 interview with The Independent, she spoke of Alagna's jealousy of other artists with whom she performed, especially Jonas Kaufmann. In October 2009, Alagna announced their separation in an interview with Le Figaro. However, Gheorghiu claimed in an interview with Corriere della Sera that it was she that filed the divorce and that he wanted to get back together. Following the separation, she declined to appear opposite Alagna in Carmen at the Metropolitan Opera in December 2009. The divorce was called off in December 2009.

In a March 2011 interview with the Daily Express she stated that she and Alagna were back together, though she still planned to sing separately from him for a while. They were seen together in March 2011 backstage at London's Royal Opera House where Alagna was performing in Aida. Later that year, they jointly opened the amphitheatre in the Katara Cultural Village, Qatar. In June 2012, they sang together in two performances of La bohème at the Royal Opera House to commemorate the 20th anniversary of their meeting in a production of the same. They also sang at a joint concert in Buenos Aires, and had planned to perform together in Manon Lescaut and Adriana Lecouvreur in future seasons. However, in January 2013, they agreed to divorce.

She has been in a relationship with Romanian dentist Mihai Ciortea, who is 22 years her junior, since autumn 2013.

== Professional relationships ==
On rare occasion, Gheorghiu has had difficult relationships with opera house managements and directors. Some, but not all, of them have stemmed from her opposition to directors who, as she put it in an interview with ABC "want to express their own fantasies, forgetting about the characters. At times, she says, what they put on stage goes against both the story and the music." She has attributed her outspokenness to her upbringing in Romania under the totalitarian regime of Nicolae Ceaușescu:

Because I grew up in a country where there was no possibility of having an opinion, it makes me stronger now. Lots of singers are frightened about not getting invited back to an opera house if they speak out. But I have the courage to be, in a way, revolutionary. I want to fight for opera, for it to be taken seriously. Pop music is for the body, but opera is for the soul.

In 1996, Gheorghiu was cast as Micaëla in a new production of Bizet's Carmen, opposite Waltraud Meier and Plácido Domingo at the Metropolitan Opera. The production by Franco Zeffirelli called for the role to wear a blonde wig, which she disliked. When the Met toured the production in Japan in 1997, she refused to wear it on the first night to which then general manager Joseph Volpe said, "The wig is going on, with you or without you" and replaced her with an understudy. She then resumed the performances with the wig entirely covered by the hood of her cape.

Volpe had planned to engage Gheorghiu in the role of Violetta Valery for a new production of La traviata, to premiere in November 1998 and directed by Zeffirelli. Alagna was to sing the role of Violetta's lover, Alfredo Germont. According to Volpe, Gheorghiu and Alagna argued with the staff and the director over production details and continually delayed signing the contract. They eventually signed their contracts, and faxed them to the Met one day past their deadline. Volpe refused to accept them. The production opened with Patricia Racette and Marcelo Álvarez as the lovers.

In September 2007, Gheorghiu was dismissed from Lyric Opera of Chicago's production of La bohème by General Manager William Mason, for missing rehearsals and costume fittings, and generally "unprofessional" behavior. Gheorghiu said in a statement that she had missed some rehearsals to spend time with her husband, who was singing at the Met in Roméo et Juliette and rehearsing for Puccini's Madama Butterfly and added, "I have sung Bohème hundreds of times, and thought missing a few rehearsals wouldn't be a tragedy. It was impossible to do the costume fitting at the same time I was in New York."

Asked once if she was difficult, she replied: "No, I seek perfection!"

== Achievements ==
=== Awards ===
Gheorghiu won the title of Female Artist of the Year at the Classic Brit Awards in 2001 and 2010.

Gheorghiu has won 5 Gramophone Awards. Puccini's La rondine released by EMI Classics won Record of the Year in 1997. Her album "Verdi Heroines" (Decca) won Best Recital in 2000 and Classic FM People's Choice Award in 2001. Jules Massenet's Manon released by EMI with her in the title role won the "Best Opera Recording" and was nominated for "Best Opera Recording" in the 2002 Grammy Awards. EMI's recording of Puccini's Madama Butterfly won the Best Opera Recording in 2009.

The EMI recording of Tosca with Gheorghiu, Roberto Alagna and Ruggero Raimondi in the title roles brought her the Deutscher Schallplattenpreis award in 2002. In 2002, Gheorghiu won the Echo Klassik Award for "Female Singer of the Year". In 2004, Gheorghiu won the Best Opera Recording in the Victoires de la musique classique for Bizet's Carmen issued by EMI Classics. She also won Diapason d'Or Awards, Choc du Monde de la Musique in France, Cecilia Prize in Belgium, the Italian Musica e dischi, Foreign Lyric Production Award, the United States Critics' Award.

In 2013, the DVD of Adriana Lecouvreur released by Decca where Gheorghiu plays the title role won at the International Classical Music Awards for Best DVD Performance. In May 2014, she was included in the Gramophone Hall of Fame. On 2 October 2015, she was awarded the European Cultural Award in a special gala ceremony at the Dresden Frauenkirche.

Gheorghiu received the "Victoire d'Honneur" (Honour of Victory) award in the 2018 Victoires de la musique classique, and "Premio Puccini" award from the Foundation of Festival Puccini in the same year. In March 2019 she received the Global Star award in the "BraVo" International Professional Music Award in a ceremony held at the Bolshoi Theatre.

=== Honours ===
Gheorghiu was honoured with the vermeil Medal of the City of Paris, and was appointed Officier and Chevalier of the Ordre des Arts et des Lettres by the French Ministry of Culture.

In December 2010, Gheorghiu was presented the Order of the Star of Romania in the grade of Commander. In October 2012, Gheorghiu received the Nihil Sine Deo royal decoration from King Michael I, honoring her contribution to promoting Romanian culture in the world.

Gheorghiu holds honorary doctorates from George Enescu National University of Arts (2010), Gheorghe Dima Music Academy (2014), University of Bucharest (2017).

== See also ==
- List of music released by Romanian artists that has charted in major music markets

== Publications ==
- Gheorghiu, Angela; Tolansky, Jon (4 September 2018). Angela Gheorghiu: A Life for Art. University Press of New England. ISBN 978-1-6116-8912-9.
- Gheorghiu, Angela; Tolansky, Jon (17 September 2021). Angela Gheorghiu: O viata pentru arta. Curtea Veche Publishing. ISBN 9786064409942.
- Gheorghiu, Angela; Tolansky, Jon (1 June 2023). アンジェラ・ゲオルギュー A Life for Art. Mizunowa Publishing みずのわ出版. ISBN 978-4-86426-050-3.
