= Roberto Alagna =

French opera tenor (born 1963)

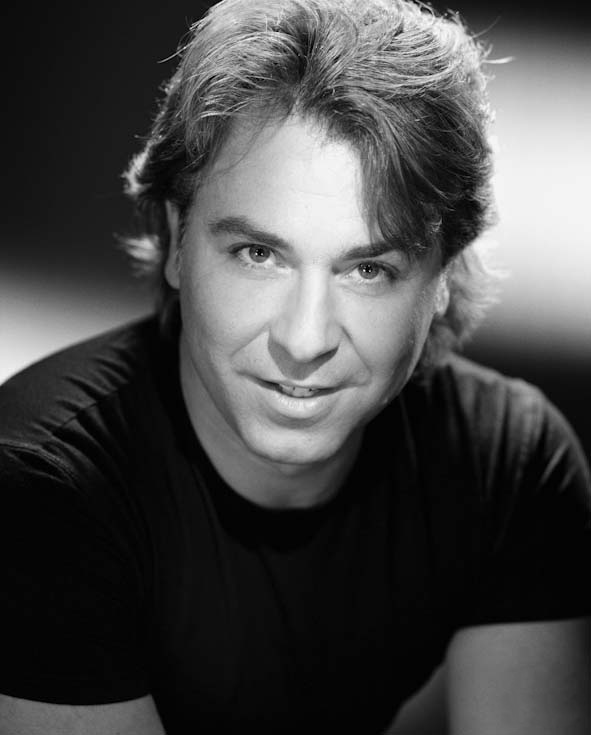
- Roberto Alagna in 2004
- Born: 7 June 1963 (age 63); Clichy-sous-Bois, Seine-Saint-Denis, France
- Citizenship: Italian; French
- Occupation: Opera singer (tenor)
- Years active: 1988–present
- Spouses: Florence Lancien (died 1994) Angela Gheorghiu (m. 1996; div. 2013) Aleksandra Kurzak (m. 2015)
- Children: 2

Roberto Alagna (Italian pronunciation: [roˈbɛrto aˈlaɲɲa]; born 7 June 1963) is a French operatic tenor. He obtained French citizenship in 1981, while also retaining his previous Italian citizenship.

== Early years ==
Alagna was born in Clichy-sous-Bois, outside the city of Paris, in 1963 to a family of Sicilian immigrants. As a teenager, the young Alagna began busking and singing pop in Parisian cabarets, mostly for tips. Influenced primarily by the films of Mario Lanza and learning from recordings of many historic tenors, he then switched to opera, but remained largely self-taught. He was discovered by Gabriel Dussurget, the co-founder of the Aix-en-Provence Festival. He had performed frequently with Romanian soprano Angela Gheorghiu, whom he first met in 1992 and married in 1996, in concerts and opera productions until their eventual divorce in 2013.

== Career ==
After winning the Luciano Pavarotti International Voice Competition, an initiative backed by the Italian Ministry of Cultural Heritage and Activities, that started in Modena in 1988, Alagna made his professional debut as Alfredo Germont in La traviata with the Glyndebourne touring company. This led to many engagements throughout the smaller cities in France and Italy, mainly again as Alfredo, a role he would eventually sing over 150 times. His reputation grew and he was soon invited to sing at major theatres such as La Scala in 1990, Covent Garden in 1992 and the Metropolitan Opera as Rodolfo in 1996. His performances of Roméo in Roméo et Juliette by Charles Gounod at Covent Garden in 1994 (opposite Leontina Vaduva) catapulted him to international stardom.

Alagna opened the 2006/07 season at La Scala on 7 December 2006 in the new production of Aida by Franco Zeffirelli. During the second performance on 10 December, Alagna, whose opening performance was considered ill-at-ease, was booed and whistled from the loggione (the least expensive seats at the very back of La Scala), and he walked off the stage. The tenor's reaction to his public criticism was denounced as immature and unprofessional by La Scala management and Zeffirelli, who said, "A professional should never behave in this way. Alagna is too sensitive, it is too easy to hurt his feelings. He does not know how to act like a true star." The role of Radames was taken over successfully for the rest of the performance by his understudy Antonello Palombi, who entered on stage wearing jeans and a black shirt.

In 2007 while at the Metropolitan Opera singing the role of Pinkerton in Madama Butterfly, Alagna replaced the indisposed tenor Rolando Villazón as Romeo in Roméo et Juliette opposite soprano Anna Netrebko for two performances in September and two performances in December. Alagna was also engaged by the Metropolitan Opera at the last minute to cover for the indisposed Marco Berti in a 16 October 2007 performance of Aida. After the performance, the audience gave him a standing ovation. The 15 December performance of Roméo et Juliette starring Alagna and Netrebko was broadcast by the Met into 447 theatres worldwide in high definition and seen by about 97,000 people.

In recent years, Alagna has been an advocate of restoring to prominence neglected French operas – Alfano's Cyrano de Bergerac, Massenet's Le jongleur de Notre-Dame, Lalo's Fiesque, and new works – Vladimir Cosma's Marius et Fanny and his brother David Alagna's Le dernier jour d'un condamné. He has also recorded light music with an homage album to Luis Mariano, Sicilien, and Pasión.

Alagna was scheduled to make his debut at the Bayreuth Festival on opening day, 25 July 2018, in the title role of a new production of Richard Wagner's Lohengrin. Alagna withdrew from the festival on 29 June 2018 citing failure to learn the role in time.

== Personal life ==
Alagna's first wife, Florence Lancien, died of a brain tumour in 1994; they had one daughter, Ornella, who was born in 1992. In 1996, he married Romanian soprano Angela Gheorghiu, having met her in 1992 in the London Bohème production. The couple announced a divorce in 2009, but had reunited by 2011. However, in January 2013, the couple mutually agreed on a formal divorce. Alagna and Polish soprano Aleksandra Kurzak had begun a relationship, and their daughter, Malena, was born on 29 January 2014. Alagna and Kurzak married in 2015.

Alagna has worked together on several projects with his brothers Frédérico Alagna and the stage director and composer David Alagna. The three brothers recorded an album of light music, Serenades, and worked together on the younger brother David's opera based on Victor Hugo's The Last Day of a Condemned Man. Alagna has often sung Alfano's Cyrano opposite his sister-in-law Nathalie Manfrino as Roxane.

The government of France named Alagna Chevalier of the Légion d'honneur in 2008.

== Opera roles ==
- Alfredo, La traviata (Verdi)
- Manrico, Il trovatore (Verdi)
- Don José, Carmen (Bizet)
- Rodolfo, La bohème (Puccini)
- Roméo, Roméo et Juliette (Gounod)
- Edgardo, Lucia di Lammermoor (Donizetti)
- Edgar, Lucie de Lammermoor (French adaptation) (Donizetti)
- Fritz, L'amico Fritz (Mascagni)
- Hoffmann, Les Contes d'Hoffmann (Offenbach)
- Mario Cavaradossi, Tosca (Puccini)
- Macduff, Macbeth (Verdi)
- Nemorino, L'elisir d'amore (Donizetti)
- Paolo, Francesca da Rimini (Zandonai)
- Roberto, Roberto Devereux (Donizetti)
- Cyrano, Cyrano de Bergerac (Alfano)
- Don Carlos, Don Carlos (Verdi)
- Don Carlo, Don Carlo (Italian adaptation) (Verdi)
- Werther, Werther (Massenet)
- Le Chevalier des Grieux, Manon (Massenet)
- Jean, Le jongleur de Notre-Dame (Massenet)
- Faust, Faust (Gounod)
- Ruggero, La rondine (Puccini)
- Orphée, Orphée et Eurydice (Gluck)
- Pinkerton, Madama Butterfly (Puccini)
- Turiddu, Cavalleria rusticana (Mascagni)
- Canio, Pagliacci (Leoncavallo)
- Duke of Mantua, Rigoletto (Verdi)
- Fiesque, Fiesque (Lalo)
- Marius, Marius et Fanny (Cosma)
- Radamès, Aida (Verdi)
- Rodrigue, Le Cid (Massenet)
- Ulysse, Pénélope (Fauré)
- Enée, Les Troyens (Berlioz)
- Nadir, Les pêcheurs de perles (Bizet)
- Riccardo, Un ballo in maschera (Verdi)
- Calaf, Turandot (Puccini)
- Chevalier des Grieux, Manon Lescaut (Puccini)
- Samson, Samson et Dalila (Saint-Saëns)
- Otello, Otello (Verdi)

== Discography ==
=== Albums ===
Year	Album	Credits	Charts				
Year	Album	Credits	BEL (Wa)	FRA	SPA	SWI	MEX
1996	Chants sacrés		—	19	—	—	—
2001	Puccini: Tosca	Angela Gheorghiu, Roberto Alagna and Ruggero Raimondi	—	89	—	—	—
2002	Donizetti: Lucie de Lammermoor	Natalie Dessay, Roberto Alagna, Ludovic Tézier and Evelino Pidò	—	150	—	—	—
2003	Bizet: Carmen	Gheorghiu & Alagna	—	59	—	—	—
2005	Chante Luis Mariano		14	4	—	89	—
2006	Tenor		86	40	—	—	—
2006	Viva Opéra!		29	43	—	—	—
2007	Credo – Airs sacrés		56	18	—	—	—
2008	Sicilien		4	2	—	71	—
2009	Le jongleur de Notre-Dame		—	198	—	—	94
2009	Sicilien – Live		72	56	—	—	—
2010	Hommage à Luis Mariano – C'est magnifique!		53	27	—	—	—
2010	Les stars du classique		—	191	—	—	—
2011	Pasión		5	4	34	100	—
2012	Pasión Live		—	80	—	—	—
2013	Robertissimo		24	11	—	—	—
2014	Little Italy		—	71	—	—	—
2014	Ma vie est un opéra		50	33	—	—	—
2016	Malèna	Yvan Cassar, London Orchestra & Roberto Alagna	—	47	—	—	—
2018	Puccini in Love	Roberto Alagna / Aleksandra Kurzak	160	—	—	—	—
2019	Caruso 1873	Roberto Alagna	—	40	—	—	—
2020	Robert Alagna: Essentials	Roberto Alagna		—	—	—	—
2020	Le Chanteur	Roberto Alagna		—	—	—	—

=== Singles ===
Year	Album	Charts
Year	Album	FR
2003	"Petit Papa Noël"	91

== Videography ==
- James Levine's 25th Anniversary Metropolitan Opera Gala (1996), Deutsche Grammophon DVD, B0004602-09
