= King Roger (opera) =

Opera by Karol Szymanowski

King Roger Król Roger
- Opera by Karol Szymanowski
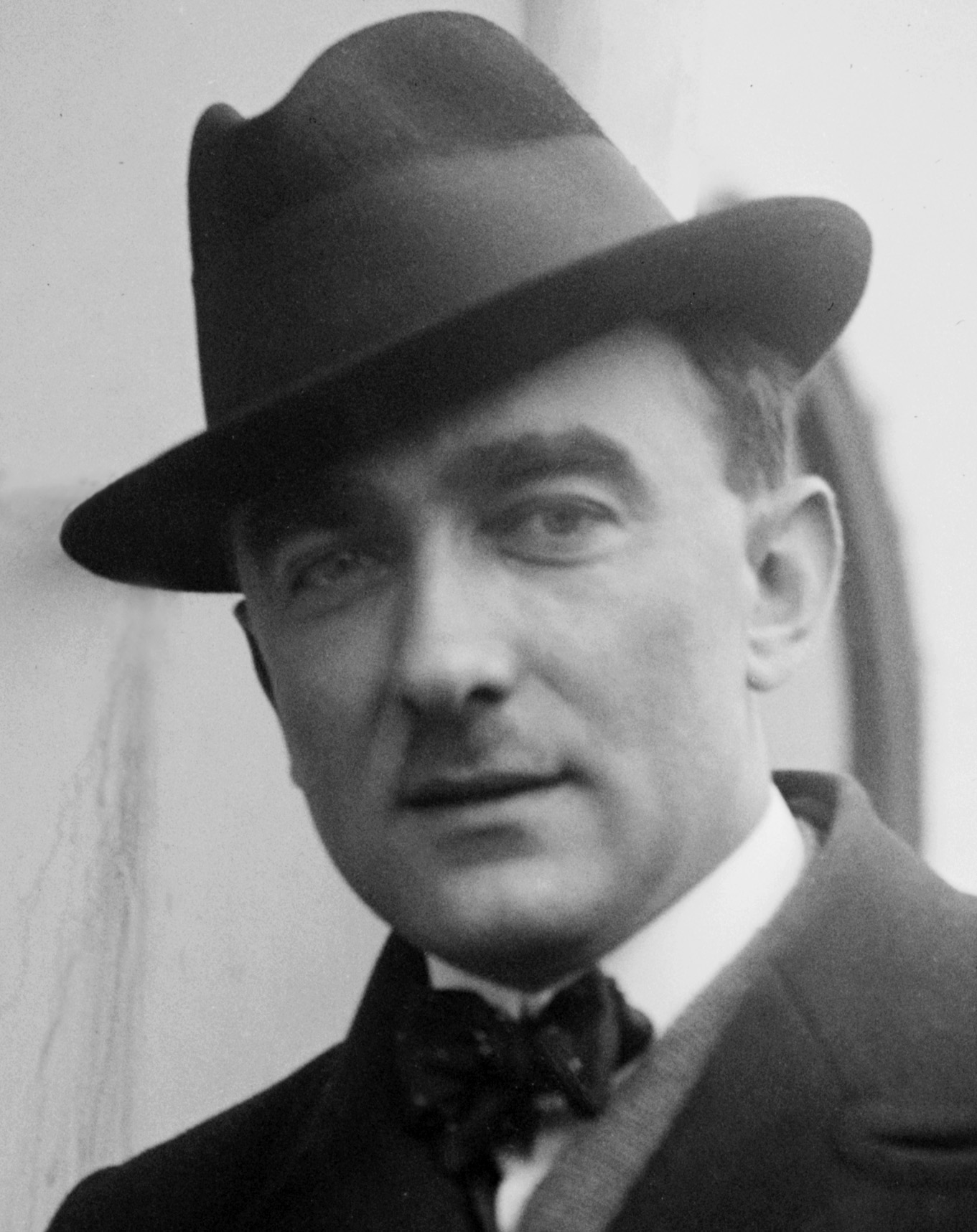
- Szymanowski in 1922
- Librettist: Karol Szymanowski; Jarosław Iwaszkiewicz
- Language: Polish
- Based on: life of Roger II of Sicily
- Premiere: 19 June 1926; Grand Theatre, Warsaw

King Roger (Polish: Król Roger, Op. 46) is an opera in three acts by Karol Szymanowski to a Polish libretto by the composer himself and Jarosław Iwaszkiewicz, the composer's cousin. The score was finished in 1924. The opera received its world premiere on 19 June 1926 at the Grand Theatre, Warsaw, with the cast including the composer's sister, the soprano Stanisława Korwin-Szymanowska, as Roxana.

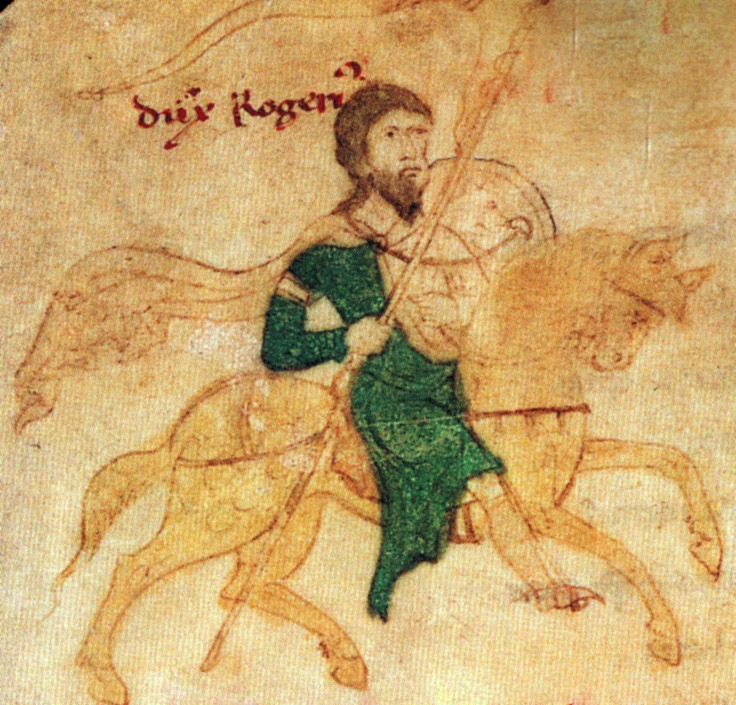
King Roger II of Sicily, from Liber ad honorem Augusti, 1196

The opera deals with the life of Roger II of Sicily. The "Sicilian drama", as the composer called it, originated from Szymanowski's enthusiasm for Mediterranean culture as a melting pot of different peoples and religions. He spent much time travelling in that area in 1911 and in 1914, and shared his love of the region with Iwaszkiewicz. In the summer of 1918 at Odessa, Szymanowski and Iwaszkiewicz conceived the project, and composed the opera over the period of 1918 to 1924. Szymanowski's lost novel Efebos dealt with mystical themes similar to those that inspired this work; Szymanowski labelled it a "Misterium".

Jim Samson has placed King Roger in a musico-psychological analysis of Szymanowski's compositional struggles. Alistair Wightman has briefly discussed Szymanowski's stylised treatment of Arabic musical idioms in the score. Stephen Downes has analysed in detail the themes of "duality" and "transformation" expressed in the music of the opera.

== Performance history ==
King Roger was premiered at the Grand Theatre in Warsaw on 19 June 1926. Stagings of the opera have been relatively rare. Two productions followed closely, the first at Theater Duisburg, Germany, in October 1928, and the second in October 1932 at the Národní divadlo in Prague. The first post-World War II presentation took place in Palermo in 1949 in the presence of its librettist, conducted by Mieczysław Mierzejewski, set design by Renato Guttuso, Giovanni Inghilleri sang Roger, Clara Petrella sang Roxana, Antonio Annaloro the Shepherd. After that some years passed before the opera was staged again.

In 1975, the New Opera Company in London produced the work under the baton of Charles Mackerras. In the US the opera was first seen in 1981, in a concert version given by the St. Louis Symphony in St. Louis, conducted by Leonard Slatkin. That same year it was presented at the Teatro Colón in Buenos Aires, conducted by Stanisław Wisłocki. In August 1982, a concert performance was given at Wolf Trap Farm Park in the temporary tent structure that stood in for the Filene Center, which had been destroyed by fire in April. Featuring Allan Monk in the title role and Richard Cassilly as the Shepherd and conducted by then Music Director Richard Woitach, it also featured young artists from the Wolf Trap Opera company.

Since the late 1980s and into the present century, King Roger seems to have enjoyed something of a revival with about thirteen productions in many different locations. In 1988, the Long Beach Opera in California, known for its innovative approach to the repertoire, had Murry Sidlin as conductor and James Johnson as King Roger, Nancy Shade as Roxana, and Jonathan Mack as Edrisi. A concert performance was given on 3 March 1990 at the Royal Festival Hall by the BBC Symphony Orchestra and Chorus conducted by Andrew Davis. This was the opening concert of a festival of Szymanowski's works given by the South Bank Arts Centre. David Wilson-Johnson took the title role, with Wieslaw Ochman as the Shepherd, Eilene Hannan as Roxana, Martyn Hill as Edrisi, Matthew Best as the Archbishop and Anne Collins as the Archdeaconess. Sydney Dance Company used the opera as a recorded soundtrack for its ballet of King Roger in the Sydney Opera House in 1990. Palermo presented King Roger again in 1992. Four concert versions were given by the end of the 1990s: the first by Orchestre National de France in Paris, conducted by Charles Dutoit in 1996 and at the London Proms by the City of Birmingham Symphony Orchestra under Simon Rattle in 1998, while the third and fourth performances were presented in Montreal and subsequently, on 17 October 1999, at Carnegie Hall for the New York Premiere with Charles Dutoit and the Montreal Symphony Orchestra.

In the 21st century, King Roger was given by the Polish National Opera in 2000 and in the same year also in Amsterdam by the Netherlands Opera, conducted by Hartmut Haenchen. In 2002, Charles Dutoit conducted the Japanese premiere of the work in a concert version with the NHK Symphony Orchestra in Tokyo, as well as in Prague with the Czech Philharmonic in 2007. The Mariinsky Opera Company brought the work to the Edinburgh Festival in 2008 under Valery Gergiev and directed by Mariusz Treliński.

It was presented in Palermo in 2005 and also by the Wrocław Opera in 2007. A subsequent US performance was at the Bard SummerScape festival in 2008.

Both the Gran Teatre del Liceu in Barcelona and the Opéra National de Paris in Paris, conducted by Kazushi Ono presented it in 2009. In 2011, King Roger appeared at the Staatstheater Mainz. A new production of the opera was staged in Polish at The Santa Fe Opera on 21 July 2012 with Mariusz Kwiecień in the title role. In 2013, King Roger was presented at the 17th Festival Amazonas de Ópera in Manaus, Brazil, with Marcin Bronikowski in the title role. In June 2014, a new production was staged at the Wuppertal Opera House in Germany. Two performances took place in Boston in March 2015 with the Boston Symphony Orchestra and Charles Dutoit. The Royal Opera House, Covent Garden, introduced a new co-production with Opera Australia, conducted by Antonio Pappano, in May 2015. The first performance in Australia was shown by Opera Australia in 2017 in Sydney and Melbourne, conducted by Andrea Molino, with Saimir Pirgu as the Shepherd. In July 2026, Des Moines Metro Opera presented a new production in Indianola, Iowa, directed by Chas Rader-Shieber, with Christopher Sokolowski as the Shepherd and Alexander Birch Elliott in the title role, marking the centenary of the opera's 1926 premiere.

== Roles ==
Role	Voice type	Premiere, 19 June 1926 (Conductor: Emil Młynarski)
Roger II, King of Sicily	baritone	Eugeniusz Mossakowski
Roxana, his wife	soprano	Stanisława Korwin-Szymanowska
Edrisi, an Arab scholar	tenor	Maurycy Janowski
Shepherd	tenor	Adam Dobosz
Archbishop	bass	Roman Wraga
Deaconess	contralto	Teodozja Skonieczna
Priests, monks, nuns, acolytes, courtiers, guards, eunuchs, Shepherd's disciples

== Synopsis ==
Place: Sicily
Time: 12th century

The story concerns the enlightenment of the Christian King Roger II by a young shepherd who represents pagan ideals.

=== Act 1 ===
Often known as the "Byzantine" act

The Shepherd is introduced to King Roger and his court during mass at the Palermo Cathedral. Despite calls by the Archbishop as well as the crowd for his punishment as a heretic, Roxana, Roger's wife, convinces the King not to kill him. She implores him to pass a fair judgment on the Shepherd. Roger orders the young man to appear at the palace that night, where he will explain himself and submit to the King's judgement.

=== Act 2 ===
The "Oriental" act, representing India and the Middle East

As instructed, the Shepherd appears at the palace gates. Roxana sings a seductive song which is clearly a response to the visitor, causing Roger to grow increasingly agitated. As the Shepherd is led in, he describes his faith in detail and soon almost the entire court joins him in an ecstatic dance. Roger attempts to chain him, but the Shepherd easily breaks free, and leaves the palace with almost all of those assembled following him. At first the King and his Arab advisor, Edrisi are left alone, but soon it is decided that Roger will join the Shepherd.

=== Act 3 ===
The "Greco-Roman" act

In an ancient Greek theater, King Roger and Edrisi rejoin Roxana, who informs her husband that only the Shepherd can free him of his fear and jealousy. A fire is lit, and the Shepherd's followers commence another dance, while the Shepherd is transformed into Dionysus. As the dance ends and the participants leave the stage, Roger is left transformed by the experience, and sings a joyous hymn at the arrival of the morning sun.

== Recordings ==
Year	Cast: (King Roger, Roxana, Edrissi, Shepherd)	Conductor, Opera house and orchestra	Label
1965 & 1988	Andrzej Hiolski, Hanna Rumowska, Kazimierz Pustelak, Zdzisław Nikodem	Mieczysław Mierzejewski, Polish National Opera Orchestra and Chorus and Youth Choir : Grand Theatre – National Opera Warszawa	AAC: Polskie Nagrania 1965, Cat: 0250/1; Olympia 1988, Cat: OCD 303
1990	Andrzej Hiolski, Barbara Zagórzanka, Wiesław Ochman, Henryk Grychnik	Karol Stryja, Polish State Philharmonic Orchestra and Chorus and the Cracow Philharmonic Boys' Choir	CD: Marco Polo, Cat: 223339; Naxos, Cat: 8660062-63
1992	Florian Skulski, Barbara Zagórzanka, Stanisław Kowalski, Zdzisław Nikodem	Robert Satanowski, Polish National Opera Orchestra and Chorus and Youth Choir : Grand Theatre – National Opera Warszawa	CD: Koch-Schwann, Cat: 314 014 K2
1998	Thomas Hampson, Elżbieta Szmytka, Ryszard Minkiewicz, Philip Langridge	Simon Rattle, City of Birmingham Symphony Orchestra and Chorus, plus City of Birmingham Symphony Youth Chorus	CD: EMI; Cat: 56823 and Cat: 14576
2003	Wojtek Drabowicz, Olga Pasichnyk, Piotr Beczała, Krzysztof Szmyt	Jacek Kaspszyk, Polish National Opera Orchestra and Chorus and All Polacca Youth Choir (Live recording of a broadcast at the Teatr Wielki, Warsaw, January)	CD: Accord; Cat: ACD 131–2
2007	Andrzej Dobber, Aleksandra Buczek, Rafal Majzner, Pavlo Tolstoy	Ewa Michnik, Wroclaw Opera Orchestra and Choir and Angelus Chamber Choir	DVD: Narodowy Instytut Audiowizualny; Cat: 5908259554143 (PAL version only)
2009	Mariusz Kwiecień, Olga Pasichnyk, Štefan Margita; Eric Cutler	Kazushi Ono, Orchestre de l'Opéra national de Paris	DVD: Bel Air Media
2009	Scott Hendricks, Olga Pasichnyk, John Graham-Hall, Willy Hartmann	Mark Elder, Vienna Symphony and the Polish Radio Choir, Kraków, plus the Children's Chorus of Musikhauptschule Bregenz	DVD: C-Major; Cat: 702808 (NTTC)
2015	Mariusz Kwiecień, Georgia Jarman, Kim Begley, Saimir Pirgu	Antonio Pappano, Royal Opera Chorus, Orchestra of the Royal Opera House	DVD: Opus Arte; Cat: 8011613
