= Agnieszka Rehlis =

Polish operatic soprano

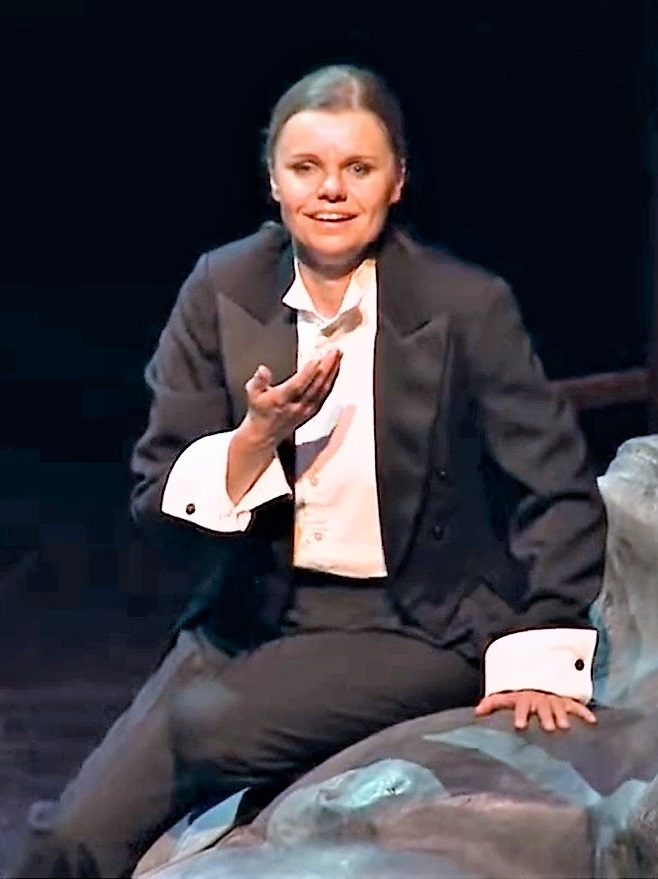
- Agnieszka Rehlis as Composer in Ariadne auf Naxos in 2016
- Born: Poland
- Education: Karol Lipiński Academy of Music
- Occupation: Classical mezzo-soprano
- Organizations: Wrocław Opera

Agnieszka Rehlis is a Polish operatic mezzo-soprano who has made an international career. She is known for portraying Verdi characters including Amneris and Azucena. She participated in music by Krzysztof Penderecki, including the world premiere of his Eighth Sinfonie and the Grammy Award–winning collection Penderecki Conducts Penderecki.

== Life and career ==
Rehlis studied voice at the Karol Lipiński Academy of Music in Wrocław. She graduated with distinction in 1996. She immediately became a member of the Wrocław Opera where she remained until 2007. Rehlis appeared in roles such as Cherubino in Mozart's Le nozze di Figaro, Verdi's Fenena in Nabucco and Flora in his La traviata, and Mercedes in Bizet's Carmen. In 2003, she appeared at the Teatr Wielki in Warsaw for the first time, as Fenena. She appeared at the Bregenz Festival as Lisa and Hannah in Weinberg's Die Passagierin, and also at Teatr Wielki, the Houston Grand Opera and the Lyric Opera in Chicago. She appeared as Amneris in Verdi's Aida at the Estonian National Opera, and the Composer in Ariadne auf Naxos at the Opera Krakowska. In the 2016/17 season, she performed the title role of Bizet's Carmen at the Podlaska Opera. She appeared at the summer DomStufen Festival in Erfurt in 2017, performing Azucena in Verdi's Il trovatore the first time. She first performed at the Opernhaus Zürich as the Abbess in Prokofiev's Der feurige Engel, repeating the role at the Scottish Opera, in Bern, Erfurt and at the Aix-en-Provence Festival.

As a concert singer, Rehlis focused on the works by Krzysztof Penderecki, often conducted by the composer. She performed in his Seven Gates of Jerusalem at Midem Classique 2000 in Cannes, in Polish Requiem and in the world premieres of both his Eighth Sinfonie in Luxembourg and his Dies Illa at the Festival van Vlaanderen in Brussels. She sang in Penderecki's A sea of dreams did breathe on me, with the National Philharmonic in Warsaw conducted by Valery Gergiev. In Zürich, she appeared as Azucena when the new GMD, Gianandrea Noseda, conducted for the first time, alongside Piotr Beczala in the title role, Marina Rebeka as Leonora and Quinn Kelsey as Luna. A reviewer wrote: "Agnieszka Rehlis was a trembling, shaking, almost possessed Azucena; despite her small figure she filled the stage with her troubling presence. Her mezzo was remarkably uniform over its range, and her high notes were powerful and brilliant. Her 'Sei vendicata, o madre', at the end, was terrifying."

== Recordings ==
Rehlis recorded Penderecki's Te Deum (Naxos, 2005) and Symphony No. 8 Lieder der Vergänglichkeit (Songs of Transience) (Naxos, 2006). She sang on the Grammy Award–winning CD Penderecki Conducts Penderecki, Volume 1 (Warner, 2016).
