= Gisle Kverndokk =

Norwegian composer (born 1967)

Gisle Kverndokk (born 3 February 1967 in Trondheim, raised in Skien) is a Norwegian contemporary composer.

== Education ==
In his teens, Kverndokk studied composition with Ragnar Søderlind. After having completed high school, Kverndokk enrolled at the Norwegian Academy of Music from which he graduated with diploma in 1994, having studied under the tutorship of Olav Anton Thommessen, Lasse Thoresen and Alfred Janson. Kverndokk has also studied at the Juilliard School in New York with John Corigliano and David Diamond.

== Career ==
1992 saw Kverndokk being bestowed with one of the main prizes of the Juilliard Composers Competition with his orchestral work Selene. For his work Initiasjon for fiolin og orkester, Kverndokk received the 1993 First Prize in the category for composers under the age of 30 at the International Rostrum of Composers held in Paris. Kverndokk has composed two solo concertos, both premiered by the Bergen Philharmonic Orchestra; Concerto for oboe and orchestra (1996) and Concerto for flute and orchestra (1998). His Peer Gynt Fantasi was composed for violinist Arve Tellefsen and the Oslo Philharmonic Orchestra for a summer concert premiere at Oslo's Holmenkollen in 2000. During the 1999-2000 concert season, Kverndokk served as the Trondheim Symphony Orchestra’s composer in residence. February 2003 saw his The Crystal Cabinet for violin, piano and orchestra premiered by the Oslo Philharmonic Orchestra.

Kverndokk’s first opera, The Falcon Tower, was premiered in 1990 with a cast of singers and musicians from the Norwegian Academy of Music. The opera’s libretto was based on Erik Fosnes Hansen’s novel by the same name. Kverndokk’s children’s opera George’s Magical Medicine was commissioned by the Kristiansund Opera and premiered in 1995 and was bestowed with a Work of the Year Prize from the Norwegian Society of Composers in the same year. The opera has subsequently seen performances domestically by the Norwegian National Opera and Ballet, Bergen’s Opera Vest and by the Trondheim Symphony Orchestra and internationally at the Schleswig-Holstein Musik Festival. The children’s operas Max and Moritz and Supersize Girl, commissioned by the New York Opera Society, saw premieres in Washington, D.C. in 2010 and 2013 respectively.

With librettist and singer Øystein Wiik, Kverndokk has penned a number of musicals. Their first joint project was the musical Sofie’s World, premiered at the Schlossfestspielen Ettlingen, Germany in 1998. 2001 saw the premiere of the musical Vincent, which depicted the life of painter Vincent van Gogh, again at the Schlossfestspielen Ettlingen. 2002 saw the premiere of musical Dangerous Liaisons, a work based on Pierre Choderlos de Laclos's novel of the same name, at the Theater Pforzheim, Germany. In autumn 2003, Kverndokk and Wiik’s musical Homeless, based on Hector Malot’s novel, premiered at Oslo’s Det Norske Teatret. Theater Erfurt premiered the musical "MartinL." at the DomStufen-Festspiele in 2008. This work was later nominated for the Nordic Council Music Prize.

Kverndokk has composed a number of church music works including Te Deum (2010) for the Norwegian Soloist's Choir, Mass (2007) for Nordic Voices, Nidaros Mass (2010) for Nidaros Cathedral Choir and Sommerens Maria (2011). Autumn 2015 saw the release of the album Fuge der Zeit, which featured a mass penned by Kverndokk for Nordic Voices based on the work Missa Brevis, originally commissioned by the 2002 Fartein Valen Dagene.

2005 saw Kverndokk debuting as a film composer with the score for Danish motion picture Chinaman, produced by Fine & Mellow.

Kverndokk's most recently composed orchestral work is Symphonic Dances written for the Stavanger Symphony Orchestra in commemoration of Norway's Centenary Celebration of its Constitution in 2014. In later years, Kverndokk has also composed a number of chamber music works, including Three Pictures (2012) for Tine Thing Helseth, the string quartet La Nouvelle Athènes (2014) for the Danish String Quartet and Offertorium (2015) for Trio ClariNord. Kverndokk's latest chamber work, Offertorium for clarinet, cello and piano, was premiered at the Ultima Oslo Contemporary Music Festival in September 2015.

== Production ==
=== Selected works ===
- Upon this handful of earth (2017)
- Ruth Maier (2015)
- Symfoniske Danser (2014)
- Supersize Girl (2013)
- Påske (2012)
- Nidarosmesse (2010)
- Jorden rundt på 80 dager (2007)
- Den fjerde nattevakt (2005)
- The Crystal Cabinet (2003)
- Frendelaus (2003)
- Bokken Lasson – sensibel suksess (2000)
- Sofies Verden (1998)
- ...in the night before the town-crier begins to cry (1994)
- Initasjon (1993)
- Selene for orchestra (1992)
- Ho som ber god frukt (1991)
- Klaversonate (1991)
- Falketårnet (1990)

=== Discography ===
- Nordic Voices, Fuge der Zeit (2015)
- Kirkens Korskole Nøtterøy, Sommerens Maria (2015)
- De Unges Orkesterforbund, Minuetto Libero (2014)
- Guro Kleven Hagen, Sara Chen, Miriam Helms Ålien, Madelene Berg, Ann Hou Sæter, Christopher Tun Andersen, Victoria Putterman, Melinda Csenki, Sonoko Miriam Shimano Welde, Nine Solos for Nine Violinists (2012)
- Peter Herresthal, Bergen Philharmonic Orchestra, Peter Kates, Catch Light (2012)
- Musical Forever 2 (2011)
- Dan Styffe, Revisited (2003)
- Steinar Hannevold, Bergen Philharmonic Orchestra, Dimitri Kitajenko, Concerto for oboe and orchestra (2001)
- Kyberia, Navigations (2000)
- Norwegian Radio Orchestra, Bokken Lasson – sensible suksess (2000)
- Songs from Sophie's World (1999)
- Øystein Wiik, Too Many Mornings 1991)
