= Symphony No. 8 (Penderecki) =

Symphony by Krzysztof Penderecki

- "Lieder der Vergänglichkeit" (Songs of Transience)
- Choral symphony by Krzysztof Penderecki
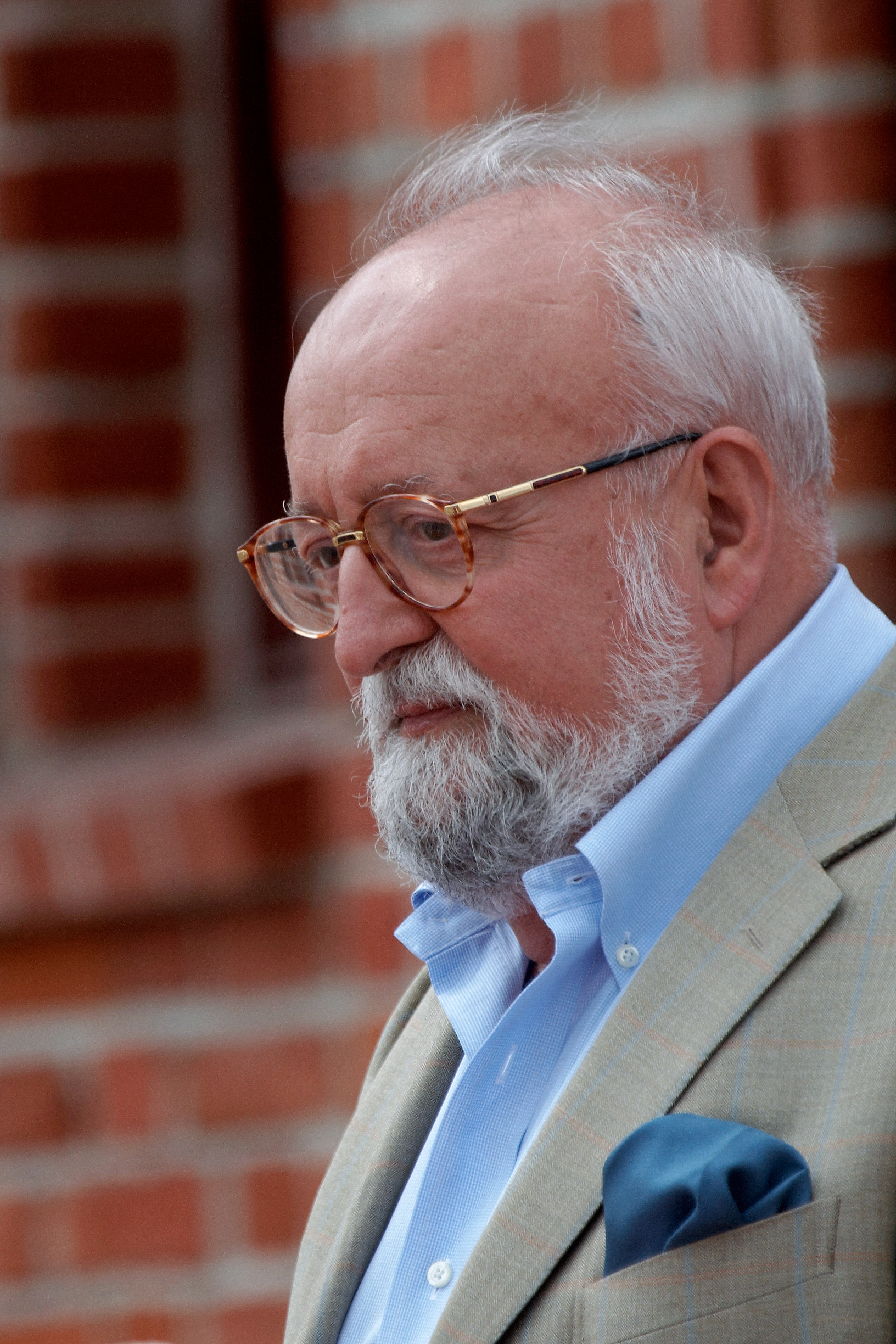
- The composer in 2008
- Text: Poems
- Language: German
- Composed: 2005 (expanded in 2007)
- Performed: 26 June 2005, Luxembourg
- Duration: 35 minutes
- Movements: 12
- Scoring: 3 soloists; choir; orchestra

The Symphony No. 8 "Lieder der Vergänglichkeit" (Songs of Transience) by Krzysztof Penderecki is a choral symphony in twelve relatively short movements set to 19th and early 20th-century German poems. The work was completed and premiered in 2005. The symphony has an approximate duration of 35 minutes. Penderecki revised the symphony in 2007 by adding a few more poem settings and the piece has expanded to around 50 minutes. Although given the designation Symphony No. 8, it was not actually the final symphony Penderecki completed before his death in March 2020; the Sixth Symphony (subtitled "Chinese Songs"), begun in 2008, was not completed until 2017.

== Premiere ==
The work was premiered on 26 June 2005 by the Luxembourg Philharmonic Orchestra conducted by Bramwell Tovey. Vocalists for the premiere were Olga Pasichnyk (soprano), Agnieszka Rehlis (mezzo-soprano), and Wojtek Drabowicz (baritone).

== Movements ==
1. "Nachts" (By Night), poem by Joseph von Eichendorff. The first movement begins quietly with strings and woodwinds and builds up as the mezzo and mixed chorus enter.
2. "Ende des Herbstes" (End of Autumn, stanza 1), poem by Rainer Maria Rilke. The second movement describes the inevitability and danger of change. The orchestra and vocals become more ominous and forceful then die away as the movement reaches its conclusion.
3. "Bei einer Linde" (By a Lime Tree), poem by Joseph von Eichendorff. The text depicting the passing of spring is sung by the baritone soloist. The movement comes to a close with an oboe solo.
4. "Flieder" (Lilac), poem by Karl Kraus. The fourth movement is noticeably faster-paced than the preceding movements. Again, this movement features the baritone. The text reflects on a blooming lilac and the splendor of existence.
5. "Frühlingsnacht" (Spring Night), poem by Hermann Hesse. The fifth movement begins quietly as it builds to an English horn solo. The baritone is again featured. The text depicts a night scene in which the speaker observes trees prior to falling asleep.
6. "Ende des Herbstes" (End of Autumn, stanza 2), poem by Rainer Maria Rilke. The sixth movement is predominantly choral until the orchestra takes over shortly before the end. The text describes how all gardens must eventually perish for the winter.
7. "Sag' ich's euch, geliebte Bäume?" (Do I Tell You, Beloved Trees?), poem by Johann Wolfgang von Goethe. The seventh movement is the first movement to feature the soprano. The movement changes mood often, most noticeably when the choir enters. The end of this movement is noticeably more climactic than the previous movements.
8. "Im Nebel" (In the Mist), poem by Hermann Hesse. The eighth movement begins with the upper parts of the chorus. The soprano remains the soloist. The movement ends with the full mixed chorus. The text is a reflection on isolation.
9. "Vergänglichkeit" (Transience), poem by Hermann Hesse. The movement opens with the soprano and strings. The orchestra and chorus build to a climactic middle section and quickly fade. The movement builds heavily again towards the end of the movement only to quickly die away once again. This building up and dying away is reflected in the text, which reflects on how the thriving can quickly expire due to the rigors of the world.
10. "Ende des Herbstes" (End of Autumn, stanza 3), poem by Rainer Maria Rilke. The tenth movement begins with the chorus than gradually builds up to a climax. The conclusion of the movement features a bass trumpet solo.
11. "Herbsttag" (Autumn Day), poem by Rainer Maria Rilke. The baritone soloist is featured again in the eleventh movement. The text describes decay brought about by autumn. The descending lines in the strings illustrate this decay.
12. "O grüner Baum des Lebens" (O Green Tree of Life), poem by Achim von Arnim. The twelfth movement is the longest in the piece. All of the vocal soloists are featured. The movement builds to multiple high points before reaching its true climax towards the end. The climax soon dissipates and the chorus is left ascending in pitch as the piece diminishes into a silent conclusion.

== Text ==
Nachts
Joseph von Eichendorff

Ich stehe in Waldesschatten
Wie an des Lebens Rand,
Die Länder wie dämmernde Matten,
Der Strom wie ein silbern Band.

Von fern nur schlagen die Glocken
Über die Wälder herein,
Ein Reh hebt den Kopf erschrocken
Und schlummert gleich wieder ein.

Der Wald aber rühret die Wipfel
Im Traum von der Felsenwand,
Denn der Herr geht über die Gipfel
Und segnet das stille Land.

Ende des Herbstes (Stanza 1)
Rainer Maria Rilke

Ich sehe seit einer Zeit,
wie alles sich verwandelt.
Etwas steht auf und handelt
und tötet und tut Leid

Bei einer Linde
Joseph von Eichendorff

Seh' ich dich wieder, du geliebter Baum,
In dessen junge Triebe
Ich einst in jenes Frühlings schönstem Traum
Den Namen schnitt von meiner ersten Liebe?

Wie anders ist seitdem der Äste Bug,
Verwachsen und verschwunden
Im härtren Stamm der vielgeliebte Zug,
Wie ihre Liebe und die schönen Stunden!

Auch ich seitdem wuchs stille fort, wie du,
Und nichts an mir wollt' weilen,
Doch meine Wunde wuchs – und wuchs nicht zu
Und wird wohl niemals mehr hienieden heilen.

Flieder
Karl Kraus

Nun weiß ich doch, 's ist Frühling wieder.
Ich sah es nicht vor so viel Nacht
und lange hatt' ich's nicht gedacht.
Nun merk' ich erst, schon blüht der Flieder.

Wie fand ich das Geheimnis wieder?
Man hatte mich darum gebracht.
Was hat die Welt aus uns gemacht!
Ich dreh' mich um, da blüht der Flieder.

Und danke Gott, er schuf mich wieder,
indem er wiederschuf die Pracht.
Sie anzuschauen aufgewacht,
so bleib' ich stehn. Noch blüht der Flieder.

Frühlingsnacht
Hermann Hesse

Im Kastanienbaum der Wind
Reckt verschlafen sein Gefieder,
An den spitzen Dächern rinnt
Dämmerung und Mondschein nieder.

In den Gärten unbelauscht
Schlummern mondbeglänzte Bäume,
Durch die runden Kronen rauscht
Tief das Atmen schöner Träume.

Zögernd leg ich aus der Hand
Meine, warmgespielte Geige,
Staune weit ins blaue Land,
Träume, sehne mich und schweige.

Ende des Herbstes (Stanza 2)
Rainer Maria Rilke

Von Mal zu Mal sind all
die Gärten nicht dieselben;
von den gilbenden zu der gelben
langsamem Verfall:
wie war der Weg mir weit.

Sag' ich's euch, geliebte Bäume?
Johann Wolfgang von Goethe

Sag' ich's euch, geliebte Bäume?
Die ich ahndevoll gepflanzt,
Als die wunderbarsten Träume
Morgenrötlich mich untanzt.
Ach, ihr wißt es, wie ich liebe,
Die so schön mich wiederliebt,
Die den reinsten meiner Triebe
Mir noch reiner wiedergibt.

Wachset wie aus meinem Herzen,
Treibet in die Luft hinein,
Denn ich grub viel Freud und Schmerzen
Unter eure Wurzeln ein.
Bringet Schatten, traget Früchte,
Neue Freude jeden Tag;
Nur daß ich sie dichte, dichte,
Dicht bei ihr genießen mag.

Im Nebel
Hermann Hesse

Seltsam, im Nebel zu wandern!
Einsam ist jeder Busch und Stein,
Kein Baum sieht den anderen,
Jeder ist allein.

Voll von Freunden war mir die Welt,
Als noch mein Leben Licht war,
Nun, da der Nebel fällt,
Ist keiner mehr sichtbar.

Wahrlich, keiner ist weise,
Der nicht das Dunkle kennt,
Das unentrinnbar und leise
Von allen ihn trennt.

Seltsam, im Nebel zu wandern!
Leben ist Einsamsein.
Kein Mensch kennt den anderen,
Jeder ist allein.

Vergänglichkeit
Hermann Hesse

Vom Baum des Lebens fällt
Mir Blatt um Blatt,
O taumelbunte Welt,
Wie machst du satt,
Wie machst du satt und müd,
Wie machst du trunken!
Was heut noch glüht
Ist bald versunken.

Ende des Herbstes (Stanza 3)
Rainer Maria Rilke

Jetzt bin ich bei den leeren
und schaue durch alle Alleen.
Fast bis zu den fernen Meeren
kann ich den ernsten schweren
verwehrenden Himmel sehn.

Herbsttag
Rainer Maria Rilke

Herr: es ist Zeit. Der Sommer war sehr groß.
Leg deinen Schatten auf die Sonnenuhren,
und auf den Fluren laß die Winde los.

Befiehl den letzten Früchten voll zu sein;
gieb ihnen noch zwei südlichere Tage,
dränge sie zur Vollendung hin und jage
die letzte Süße in den schweren Wein.

Wer jetzt kein Haus hat, baut sich keines mehr.
Wer jetzt allein ist, wird es lange bleiben,
wird wachen, lesen, lange Briefe schreiben
und wird in den Alleen hin und her
unruhig wandern, wenn die Blätter treiben.

O grüner Baum des Lebens
Achim von Arnim

O grüner Baum des Lebens,
In meiner Brust versteckt,
Laß mich nicht flehn vergebens!
Ich habe dich entdeckt.
O zeige mir die Wege
Durch diesen tiefen Schnee,
Wenn ich den Fuß bewege,
So gleit ich von der Höh.

Ich bliebe dir gern eigen,
Ich gäb mich selber auf, –
Willst du den Weg mir zeigen,
Soll enden hier mein Lauf?
Mein Denken ist verschwunden,
Es schlief das Haupt mir ein,
Es ist mein Herz entbunden
Von der Erkenntnis Schein.

Ich werd in Strahlen schwimmen,
Aus dieses Leibes Nacht,
Wohin kein Mensch kann klimmen,
Mit des Gedankens Macht.
Es ward mein Sinn erheitert,
Die Welt mir aufgetan
Der Geist in Gott erweitert,
Unendlich ist die Bahn!

== Instrumentation ==
The score calls for 3 flutes (1st doubling bamboo flute, 2nd doubling alto flute, 3rd doubling piccolo), 2 oboes, cor anglais, 3 clarinets (3rd doubling E-flat clarinet and bass clarinet), 2 bassoons, contrabassoon, 4 horns, 3 trumpets, bass trumpet (in the hall), 3 trombones, tuba, timpani, mark tree, Turkish crescent, crash cymbals, 4 suspended cymbals, 2 tam-tams, tambourine, snare drum, bass drum with cymbals, ratchet, crotales, 3 temple blocks, tubular bells, church bells, glockenspiel, xylophone, marimba, harp, piano (doubling celesta), and strings. The score also calls for choir and features soprano, mezzo-soprano, and baritone soloists.

The score also requires 50 ocarinas from the choir at various tunings.
