= Tomasz Konieczny =

Polish-born bass-baritone (born 1972)

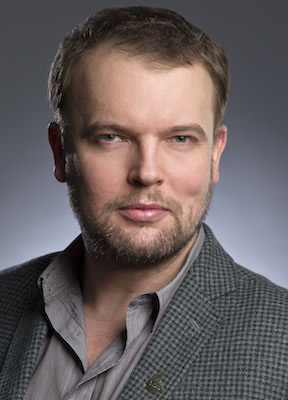
- Konieczny in 2012
- Born: 10 January 1972 (age 54); Łódź, Poland
- Education: Łódź Film School; Chopin University of Music
- Occupation: Operatic bass-baritone
- Years active: 1994–present
- Website: Official website

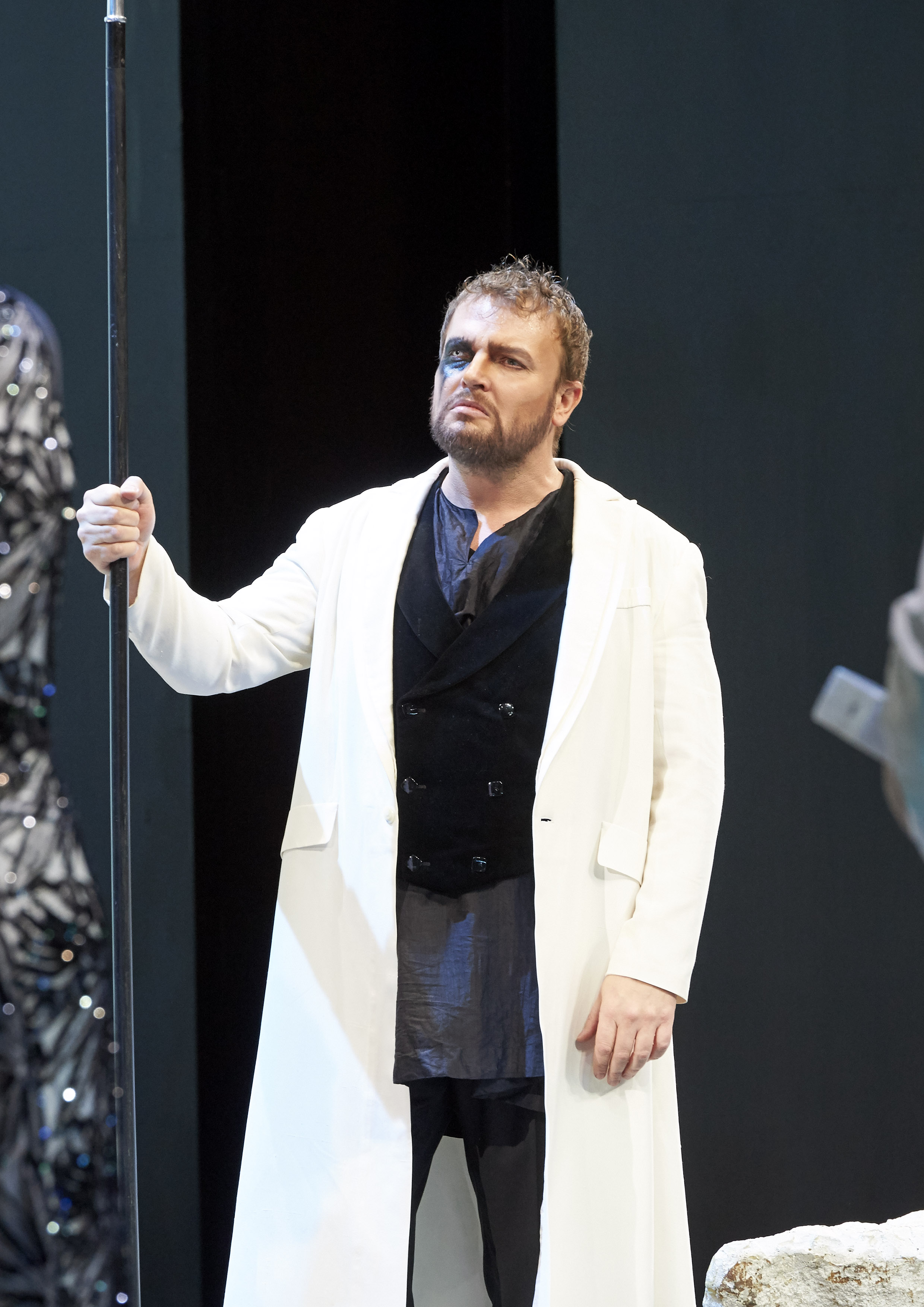
Tomasz Konieczny as Wotan in Das Rheingold, Staatsoper Wien

Tomasz Konieczny (Polish pronunciation: [ˈtɔmaʂ kɔˈɲɛt͡ʂnɨ]; born 10 January 1972) is a Polish bass-baritone.

== Life and work ==
He was born on 10 January 1972 in Łódź, Poland. He commenced his studies as an actor at the Film, TV and Theatre Academy in Łódź. Following this he studied voice at the Chopin University of Music in Warsaw, finishing his studies under the guidance of Professor Christian Elßner at the Hochschule für Musik Carl Maria von Weber in Dresden.

He made his debut in a film directed by Oscar-winning director Andrzej Wajda The Ring with the Eagle following this he worked as an actor/director in many TV, film and theatre productions in Poland.

He made his debut as a singer in 1997 in the role of Figaro (Marriage of Figaro) in Poznań, Poland.

Two years later he made his debut at the Oper Leipzig as Kecal in the Bartered Bride (Smetana) where he remained for the 1999–2000 season.

In 2000 he was engaged as a bass at the Theater Lübeck where he sang Procida (I vespri siciliani), Pandolph (Cendrillon), Orest (Elektra) and Ramfis (Aida).

Since 2002/2003 he has been a member of the ensemble of Nationaltheater Mannheim where he received the Arnold Petersen Prize for talented young singers, his roles in Mannheim have included Orest, Pimen (Boris Godunow), King Mark (Tristan & Isolde), Sarastro (The Magic Flute), Amfortas (Parsifal), Wotan (Das Rheingold, Walküre), Pizzaro (Fidelio), Grand Inquisitor (Don Carlo), Melitone (La forza del destino) and Jochanaan (Salome).

In February 2005 he made his debut at the Staatstheater Stuttgart as Sarastro and in June 2005 as King Vladislav in Smetana's Dalibor at the Staatstheater Saarbrücken.

In September he made his debut at the Deutsche Oper am Rhein in April 2006 as Osmin and Melitone (La forza del destino) and in May 2006 as Wotan (Das Rheingold). In the 2006/7 season he became a member of the Ensemble of the Deutsche Oper am Rhein Düsseldorf/Duisburg. He sang here as Bottom (A Midsummer Night's Dream) in 2006, in 2007 Kurwenal (Tristan und Isolde), Golaud (Pelléas et Mélisande), and Turco (Il Turco in Italia), and in 2008 Amfortas (Parsifal).

In June 2006 he sang at Budapester Wagner Tage as Amfortas (Parsifal). The conductor was Ádám Fischer.

In August 2006 he made his debut in Matthäuspassion, Arias of Bach in São Paulo and Rio de Janeiro. The conductor was Kent Nagano.

In January 2008 he made his debut at the Semperoper Dresden as Alberich. The conductor was Peter Schneider.

In April 2008 he made also his debut at the Wiener Staatsoper as Alberich (new production of Der Ring des Nibelungen). The conductor was Franz Welser-Möst.

In 2017 he made his debut at the Canadian Opera Company as Mandryka in R. Strauss's Arabella. The conductor was Patrick Lange.

In 2019, he made his debut at the Metropolitan Opera as Alberich in Wagner's Der Ring des Nibelungen.

== Honours and awards ==
Tomasz Konieczny is the recipient of many awards, including the Polish Arts and Culture Prize, the Alfred Toepfer Foundation Prize, the Arnold Petersen Award, the Stadtsparkasse Prize in Dresden, and Second Prize in the International Dvořák competition in Karlsbad.

In 2019, he received the Austrian distinction of Kammersänger.

== See also ==
- Mariusz Kwiecień
- Piotr Beczała
- Jakub Józef Orliński
