= Michnick =

Michnick is a surname, a variant of Michnik. Notable people with this surname include:

- Roberta Michnick Golinkoff, American developmental psychologist, educator and writer
- Irwin Michnick, birth name of Mitch Leigh (1928-2014), American musical theatre composer and theatrical producer
