= Piotr Beczała =

Polish operatic tenor

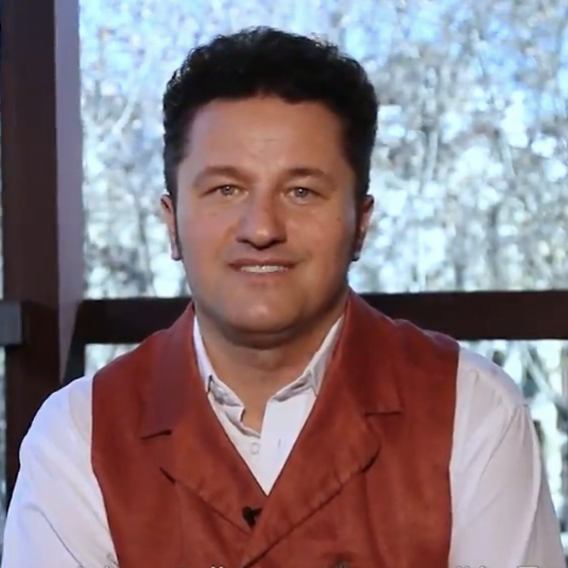
- Piotr Beczała in 2012
- Born: 28 December 1966 (age 59); Czechowice-Dziedzice, Polish People's Republic
- Education: Karol Szymanowski Academy of Music
- Occupation: Opera singer (tenor)
- Years active: 1992–present
- Spouse: Katarzyna Bąk
- Awards: Echo Klassik Award (2014); Order of Polonia Restituta (2015); International Opera Award (2018); Medal for Merit to Culture – Gloria Artis (2018)
- Website: piotrbeczala.com

Piotr Beczała (Polish pronunciation: [ˈpjɔtr bɛˈt͡ʂawa]); born 28 December 1966) is a Polish operatic tenor with an international career based primarily in Europe and the United States. He has performed in the world's leading opera houses including Metropolitan Opera, La Scala, Gran Teatre del Liceu, Royal Opera House, Semperoper, Carnegie Hall, Teatro Real, Deutsche Oper Berlin and is particularly known for his portrayals of characters from the operas of Giuseppe Verdi and Wolfgang Amadeus Mozart. In 2015, he was awarded the Knight's Cross of the Order of Polonia Restituta for his artistic achievements.

== Life ==
He was born in Czechowice-Dziedzice in southern Poland and initially trained in Katowice, both Upper Silesia. He studied under Sena Jurinac in Switzerland. His first engagements were with the Linz State Theatre from 1992 to 1997, after which he became a regular member of Zürich Opera. One of his early roles in Zürich was that of Matteo in Richard Strauss' Arabella (with Cheryl Studer in the title role). Between 2004 and 2006, Beczała made several major international house debuts.

In April 2004, he made his debut at London's Royal Opera House as the Italian Tenor in Der Rosenkavalier, later returning in October of that year in the title role of Faust, then in June 2005 as the Duke in Rigoletto, and in September 2006, again in Faust. In November 2004, he made his San Francisco Opera and American debut as Lensky in Eugene Onegin. Beczała's La Scala debut came in January 2006 as the Duke in Rigoletto, the role in which he also made his Metropolitan Opera, New York, debut on 19 December 2006. In 2007, Beczała was awarded the Munich Opera Festival Prize.

In 2012/2013, Beczała reprised his role as the Duke in Michael Mayer's new "Rat Pack" production of Rigoletto at the Metropolitan Opera. Following a hostile reception from the loggionisti at the opening night of the 2013/14 La Scala season in La traviata, Beczała announced his refusal ever to appear in another production at La Scala. In 2014, he was awarded the Echo Klassik Prize in the Male Singer of the Year category. In the same year, he received the Fryderyk Award conferred by the Polish Society of the Phonographic Industry in the Artist of the Year category as well as the Opera News Award presented by the American classical music magazine Opera News.

Beczała's commercial recordings include a Farao Classics recording of La traviata (as Alfredo Germont), and the complete songs of Karol Szymanowski.

In 2018 Beczała was awarded the International Opera Awards – Best Singer. In 2018, Beczala signed an exclusive, multi-album contract with Pentatone. In the same year, he became the recipient of the Gold Medal for Merit to Culture – Gloria Artis awarded by the Ministry of Culture and National Heritage of Poland for his distinguished contributions to the Polish culture and national heritage. His first solo recording on the label, Vincerò!, was released in 2020.

In 2019, Beczała received a Grammy Award nomination in the Best Opera Recording category for his performance in Deutsche Grammophon's 2018 recording Lohengrin.

In 2022, he received an honorary degree from the Karol Szymanowski Academy of Music in Katowice.

Throughout his career he has collaborated with many distinguished artists and conductors including Placido Domingo, Diana Damrau, Gerd Albrecht, Vladimir Jurowski, Anna Netrebko, Antonio Pappano, Angela Gheorghiu, Zubin Mehta, Richard Bonynge, Semyon Bychkov, Sir Andrew Davis, Edo de Waart, Iván Fischer, Marek Janowski, Michael Gielen, Carlo Maria Giulini, Nikolaus Harnoncourt, Trevor Pinnock, Philippe Herreweghe, Mariss Jansons, Ton Koopman, Kent Nagano, Christian Thielemann, Franz Welser-Möst and Alberto Zedda.

== Selected discography ==
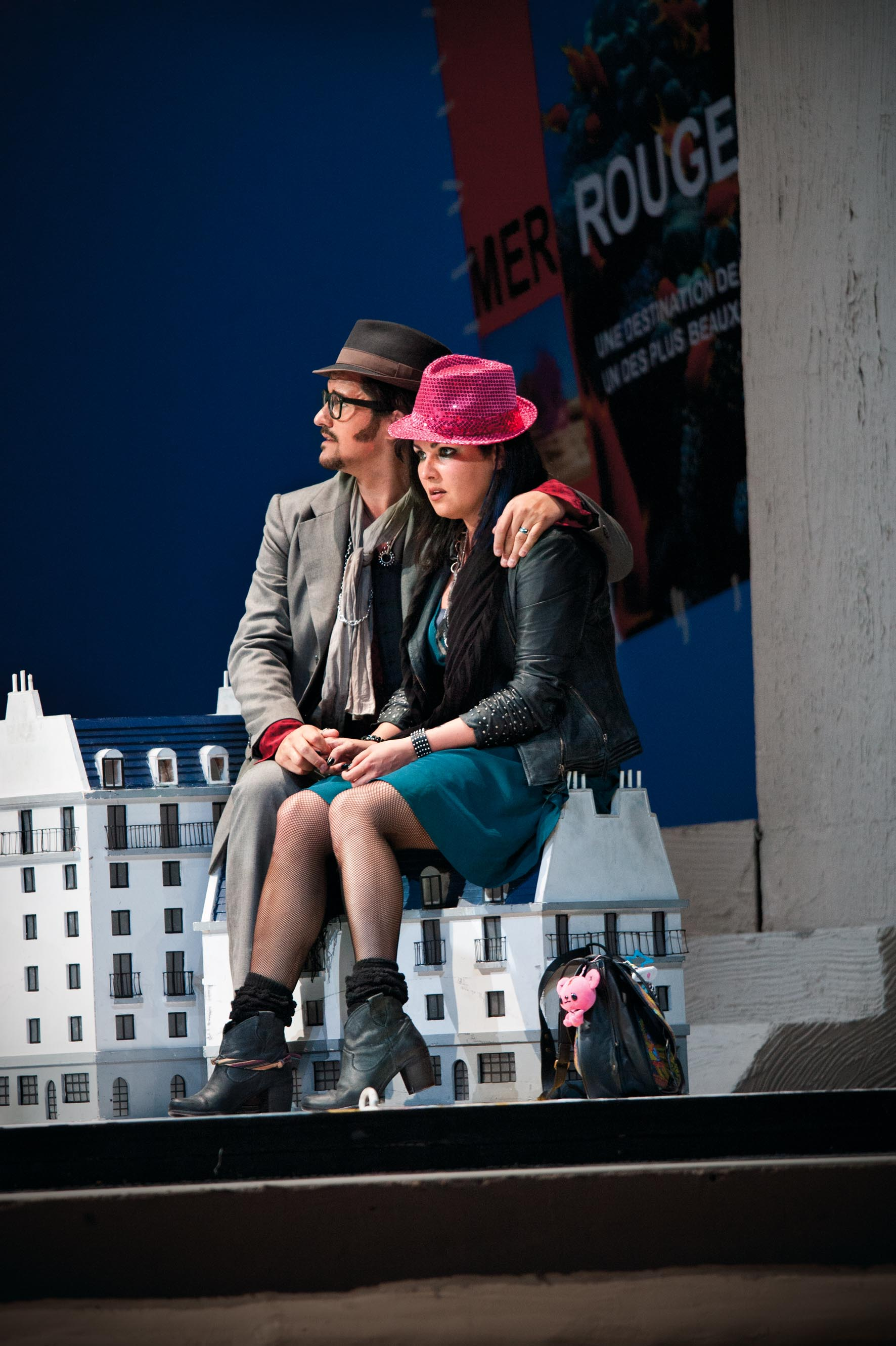
Piotr Beczała and Anna Netrebko performing in Puccini's La bohème, Salzburg Festival, 2012

- Rachmaninoff & Tchaikovsky Romances (Helmut Deutsch), PENTATONE, 2023
- Moniuszko: Halka (Tomasz Konieczny, Natalia Kawałek, Corinne Winters, Łukasz Borowicz, Mariusz Treliński, Vienna Radio Symphony Orchestra, Arnold Schoneberg Chor), (2022)
- Puccini: Tosca (Karine Babajanyan, Carlos Álvarez, Marco Armiliato, Orchester der Wiener Staatsoper), (2021)
- Lohengrin (Anja Harteros, Tomasz Konieczny, Waltraud Meier, Georg Zeppenfeld, Christian Thielemann, Chor & Orchester der Bayreuther Festspiele), Deutsche Grammophon, (2019)
- 50 Years At Lincoln Center – A Gala Celebration (Marco Armiliato, James Levine, Yannick Nézet-Séguin, Metropolitan Opera Orchestra and Chorus, The Metropolitan Opera), (2017)
- Gounod: Faust (Salzburger Festspiele 2016) (Alejo Pérez, Reinhard von der Thannen, Wiener Philharmoniker, Philharmonia Chor Vienna), UNITEL CLASSICA (2017)
- The French Collection (Diana Damrau, Opéra National de Lyon, Alain Altinoglu), Deutsche Grammophon, CD (2015)
- Heart's Delight: The Songs of Richard Tauber (Anna Netrebko, Daniela Fally, Avi Avital, Royal Philharmonic Orchestra, Łukasz Borowicz), Deutsche Grammophon, CD (2013)
- Verdi: Rigoletto (Željko Lučić, Diana Damrau, Oksana Volkova, Stefan Kocán), Blu-ray Disc, DVD (2013)
- Verdi (Polish Radio Symphony Orchestra, Łukasz Borowicz, Ewa Podleś, Mariusz Kwiecień), CD (2013)
- Verdi: Requiem (Kristin Lewis, Violeta Urmana, Ildar Abdrazakov, Philippe Jordan, Paris National Opera Chorus, Paris National Opera Orchestra), Erato (2013)
- Donizetti: Lucia di Lammermoor (Anna Netrebko, Mariusz Kwiecień, Ildar Abdrazakov), Blu-ray Disc (2013)
- Happy New Year (Die Operettengala aus Dresden) (Ingeborg Schopf, Diana Damrau, Staatskapelle Dresden, Blu-ray Disc, CD, DVD (2013)
- Puccini: La bohème (Anna Netrebko, Nino Machaidze, Massimo Cavalletti, Alesso Arduini, Carlo Colombara, Daniele Gatti), CD, DVD (2012)
- Mahler: Symphony No. 9 (LSO Live) (Valery Gergiev, London Symphony Orchestra), SACD (2012)
- Live aus der Semperoper (The Lehár Gala From Dresden) (Angela Denoke, Ana Maria Labin, Staatskapelle Dresden, Christian Thielemann), CD, DVD (2012)
- Dvořák: Rusalka (Camilla Nylund, Birgit Remmert, Alan Held, Emily Magee, The Cleveland Orchestra, Franz Welser-Möst), CD (2011)
- Beethoven: Symphonie Nr 9 (Annette Dasch, Mihoko Fujimura, Georg Zeppenfeld, Wiener Singverein, Wiener Philharmoniker, Christian Thielemann), DVD (2010)
- Gounod: Faust (Soile Isokoski, Michaela Selinger, Zoryana Kushpler, Kwangchul Youn, Adrian Eröd, Chor und Orchester der Wiener Staatsoper, Bertrand de Billy), 3 CD (2009)
- Donizetti: Lucia di Lammermoor (Anna Netrebko, Mariusz Kwiecień, Ildar Abdrazakov, Metropolitan Opera Orchestra and Chorus, Marco Armiliato), 2 DVD (2009)
- Giuseppe Verdi: Rigoletto (Leo Nucci, Elena Moşuc, László Polgár, Katharina Peetz, Chor und Orchester des Opernhauses Zürich, Nello Santi), DVD (2006)
- Franz Lehár: Das Land des Lächelns (Camilla Nylund, Julia Bauer, Alexander Kaimbacher, Alfred Berg, Chor des Bayerischen Rundfunks, Münchner Rundfunkorchester, Ulf Schirmer), 2 CD (2006)
- Wolfgang Amadeus Mozart: Don Giovanni (Thomas Hampson, Ildebrando D'Arcangelo, Christine Schäfer, Melanie Diener, Isabel Bayrakdarian Luca Pisaroni, Robert Lloyd, Konzertvereinigung Wiener Staatsopernchor, Wiener Philharmoniker, Daniel Harding), DVD (2006)
- Giuseppe Verdi: La Traviata (Anja Harteros, Chor der Bayerischen Staatsoper, Bayerisches Staatsorchester, Zubin Mehta), 2 CD (2005)
- Richard Strauss: Der Rosenkavalier (Adrianne Pieczonka, Angelika Kirchschlager, Miah Persson, Franz Hawlata, Franz Grundheber, Konzertvereinigung Wiener Staatsopernchor, Wiener Philharmoniker, Semyon Bychkov), 2 DVD (2004)
- Szymanowski: Król Roger (Wojciech Drabowicz, Olga Pasichnyk, Krzysztof Szmyt, Romuald Tesarowicz, Stefania Toczyska), 2 CD (2003)
- Jacques Offenbach: Die Rheinnixen (Nora Gubisch, Regina Schörg, Gaele Le Roi, Dalibor Jenis, Orchestre National de Montpellier, Friedemann Layer), 3 CD (2002)
- Peter Tchaikovsky: Iolanta (Olga Mykytenko, Andrey Grigorev, Benno Schollum), 2 CD (2002)
- Wolfgang Amadeus Mozart: Die Zauberflöte (Matti Salminen, Dorothea Röschmann, Desirée Rancatore, Detlef Roth, Gaele Le Roi, Choeur and Orchestre de l'Opéra national de Paris, Iván Fischer), DVD (2001)
- Hector Berlioz: Roméo et Juliette/Olivier Messiaen: L'Ascension (Sylvain Cambreling, Nadine Denize, Peter Lika, SWR Sinfonieorchester Baden-Baden und Freiburg), 2 CD (1999)
- Schubert: Messe Es-dur D 950 (Ruth Ziesak, Vesselina Kasarova, Michael Schade, Roland Schubert, MDR Leipzig Radio Symphony Orchestra Choir, Wiener Philharmoniker, Riccardo Muti), CD (1997)

== Video simulcasts ==
Beczała has appeared in twelve roles in Met Opera video simulcasts, all of which are available for streaming at Met Opera on Demand:

- Edgardo in Lucia di Lammermoor (7 February 2009)
- Des Grieux in Manon (7 April 2012)
- Duke of Mantua in Rigoletto (16 February 2013, and 29 January 2022)
- Lensky in Eugene Onegin (5 October 2013)
- The prince in Rusalka (8 February 2014)
- Vaudémont in Iolanta (14 February 2015)
- Rodolfo in Luisa Miller (14 April 2018)
- Maurizio in Adriana Lecouvreur (12 January 2019)
- Loris Ipanov in Fedora (14 January 2023)
- Lohengrin in Lohengrin (18 March 2023)
- Don José in Bizet's Carmen (27 January 2024)
- Radamès in Verdi’s Aida (25 January 2025)

== See also ==
- Music of Poland
- Polish opera
- List of Polish people
- Mariusz Kwiecień
- Jakub Józef Orliński
