= Michnik =

Michnik is a Polish-language surname. Notable people with this surname include:

- Adam Michnik, Polish former dissident, historian, journalist, and politician
- Stefan Michnik, military judge in Communist Poland
- Ewa Michnik, Polish music conductor, professor, director of Krakow Opera and Wroclaw Opera
