= Franz von Hoesslin =

German conductor

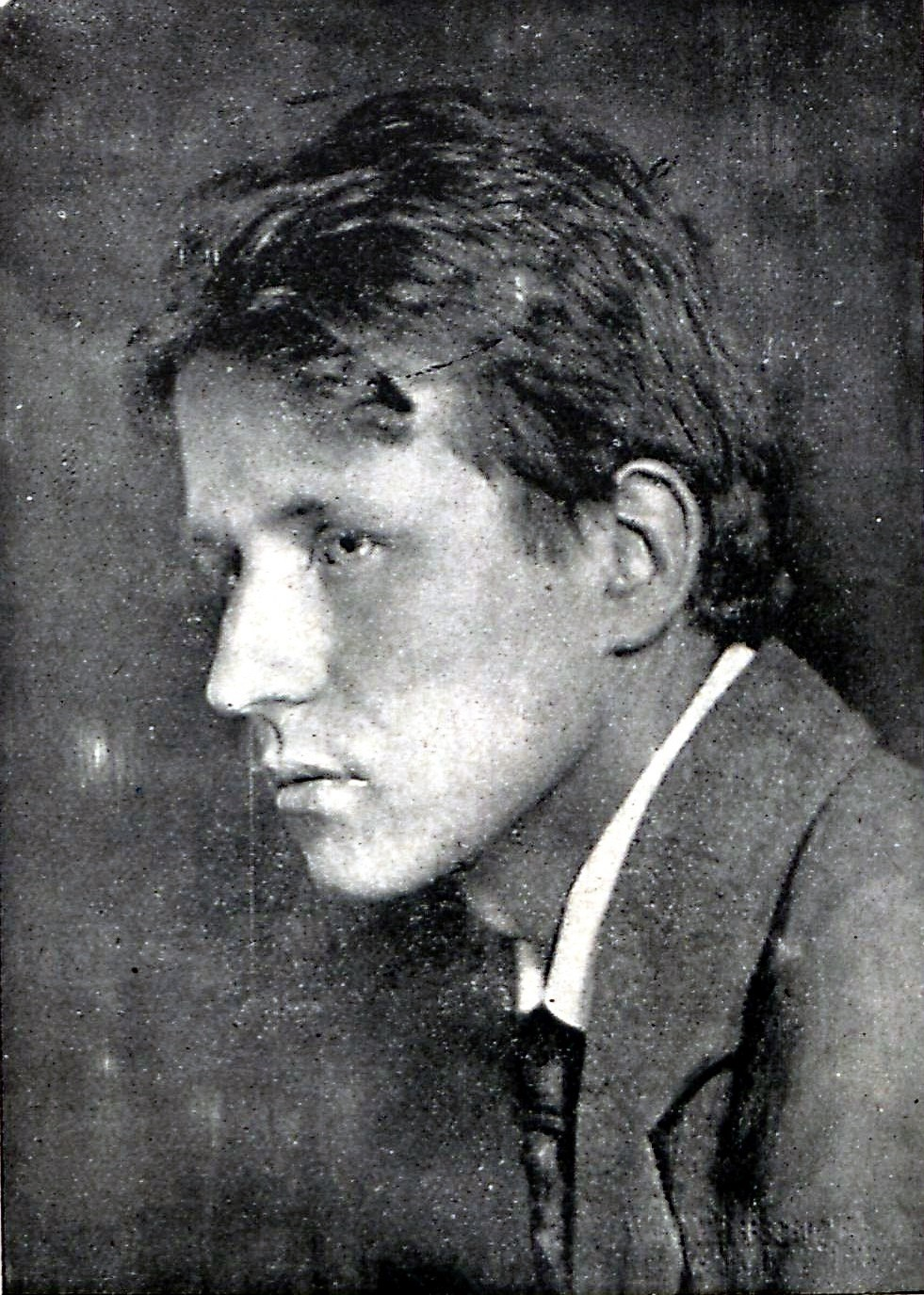
Franz von Hoesslin

Franz Johannes Balthasar von Hößlin, also Hoesslin (31 December 1885 in Munich – 25 September 1946 near Sète) was a German conductor. His second wife was the Jewish contralto Erna Liebenthal (1889–1946).

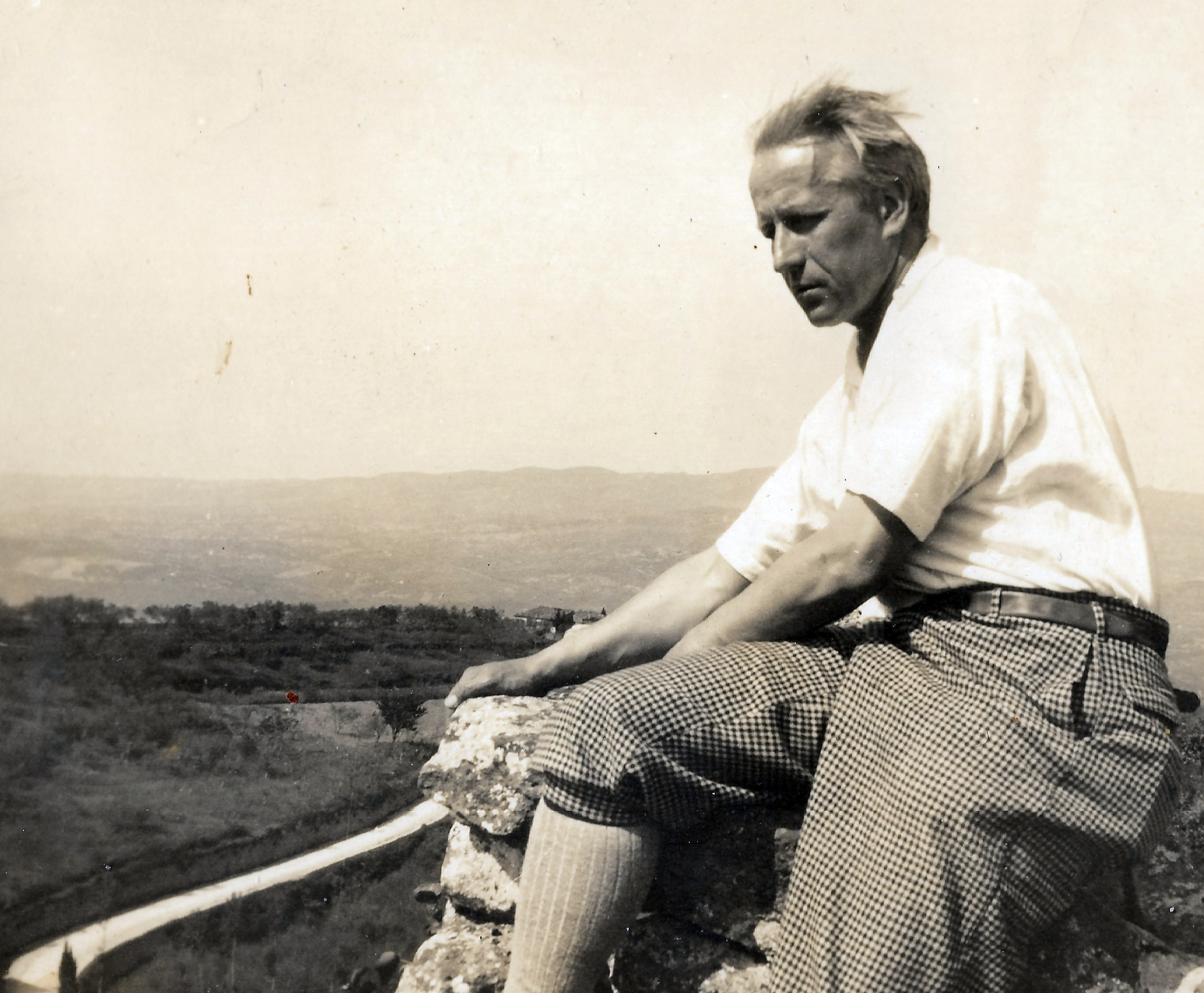
Franz von Hoesslin in Volterra, Italy, June 1930

Hoesslin was one of foremost conductors of Wagner's music in the 1920s and 1930s, conducting at the Bayreuth Festival in 1927, 1928 and 1934, and – despite having been exiled – again in 1938, 1939 and 1940 after the personal intervention of Winifred Wagner. The exile to Switzerland was occasioned after Hoesslin, then music director of the Breslau Opera, refused to conduct the playing of the Horst-Wessel song at a state ceremony. He and his wife were given 28 days to leave the city. Hoesslin responded by one final sold-out concert at which he pointedly conducted Beethoven's Ninth Symphony concluding with Schiller's "Ode to Joy".

The Hoesslins went first to Florence, but when Benito Mussolini's Italy also presented problems, then moved to Geneva where Ernest Ansermet had invited von Hoesslin to conduct the Orchestre de la Suisse Romande.

Hoesslin conducted three performances of Elektra by Richard Strauss at the Odeon of Herodes Atticus in Nazi-occupied Athens in late June and early July 1942. He also conducted two performances of the Ninth Symphony of Ludwig van Beethoven during the same tour.

On September 25, 1946, the Hoesslins were killed in an airplane accident while returning to Geneva from Barcelona. After missing the scheduled flight and being pressed to conduct a performance of Così fan tutte at the Geneva Opera, the couple chartered a small private plane. The plane crashed in the sea off Sète, killing all on board.
