= Valerian Ruminski =

American operatic bass (born 1967)

- Born: Martin Matthew Ruminski; 1967; Lackawanna, New York
- Occupation: Opera singer (bass)
- Years active: 1999 –

Valerian Ruminski (born 1967) is an American operatic bass.

== Life and career ==
Martin Matthew Ruminski, known as Valerian Ruminski, was born in Lackawanna, New York. He earned a Bachelor of Music degree at SUNY Buffalo in 1995. He received his vocal training at the Academy of Vocal Arts in Philadelphia, adopting the professional name "Valerian" in honor of his late father.

Mr. Ruminski started his career as an opera singer in 1999, with his performance at the New York City Opera in Bizet's Carmen. He was recognized with the 1999 Lincoln Center Martin Segal Award. In 2000, he received a Career Grant from the Richard Tucker Music Foundation and won the First Prize in the MacAllister Singing Competition.

He made his Metropolitan Opera debut on 17 January 2001 as Zuniga in Bizet's Carmen, later performing also as Gualtiero in I puritani (2006–2007) and Nikitich in Boris Godunov (2010–2011).

In 2004 Ruminski founded Nickel City Opera, a non-profit based in Buffalo, New York. In 2017, Ruminski received Opera America's Bravo Service Award, whose recipients "promote opera in their communities and work tirelessly to ensure the highest possible artistic quality and community service."

== Roles and opera companies ==
Ruminski's opera performances have included, among others:

- Skołuba in The Haunted Manor (Greater Buffalo Opera, 1997)
- Colline in La bohème (New York City Opera, 1999)
- Zuniga in Carmen (New York City Opera, 1999; Metropolitan Opera, 2001)
- Albert in La Juive (New Israeli Opera, 2000)
- Sparafucile in Rigoletto (New Israeli Opera, 2000)
- Ferrando in Il trovatore (Michigan Opera Theatre, 2002)
- Dottore Grenvil in La traviata (Santa Fe Opera, 2002)
- Fenicio in Ermione (Dallas Opera, 2003; New York City Opera, 2004)
- The King of Egypt in Aida (Opéra de Monte-Carlo, 2004; Florida Grand Opera, 2006)
- Frère Laurent in Roméo et Juliette (Opera Lyra, 2005)
- Don Alfonso in Così fan tutte (Seattle Opera, 2006)
- Gualtiero in I puritani (Metropolitan Opera, 2006–2007)
- Licaone in Giove in Argo (concert performance, Avery Fisher Hall, 2008)
- Garibaldo in Rodelinda (Portland Opera, 2008)
- Monterone in Rigoletto (Toledo Opera, 2008)
- Sarastro in The Magic Flute (Opera Lyra, 2009; Opera Ireland, 2009)
- Banquo in Macbeth (Opera Ireland, 2009)
- Nikitich in Boris Godunov (Metropolitan Opera, 2010–2011)
- Marquis d'Obigny in La traviata (concert performance, Vienna Musikverein, 2010)
- Raimondo in Lucia di Lammermoor (Hawaii Opera Theatre, 2011)
- The title role in Don Pasquale (Hawaii Opera Theatre, 2012)
- Don Magnifico in La Cenerentola (Seattle Opera, 2013)
- Rocco in Fidelio (Manitoba Opera, 2014)
- Daland in The Flying Dutchman (Calgary Opera, 2014)
- Nilakantha in Lakme (Calgary Opera, 2015)
- Timur in Turandot (Manitoba Opera, 2015)
- Bartolo in The Barber of Seville (Opera San Jose, 2016)
- Sacristan in Tosca (Opéra de Montréal, 2017)

== In concert and recital ==
Ruminski's concert and recital performances have included, among others:

- Solo recital, including the world premiere of six songs set to poems by Charles Bukowski (Zipper Hall, 2000)
- Handel's Messiah, as bass soloist (Buffalo Philharmonic, 2002)
- Shostakovich's Song of the Forests, as bass soloist (Bard Music Festival, 2004)
- Beethoven's 9th Symphony, as bass soloist (Buffalo Philharmonic, 2005; Honolulu Symphony. 2010)

== Recordings ==
Ruminski's recordings include:

- A Night at the Opera: Favourite opera arias, duets and ensembles – Mariusz Kwiecien, Valerian Ruminski. Matthew Polenzani, Kristine Jepson, Indra Thomas; Royal Philharmonic Orchestra, Charles Rosenkrans (conductor). CD 2004. Label: Naxos
- I Puritani – Anna Netrebko (Elvira), Eric Cutler (Arturo), Franco Vassallo (Riccardo), John Relyea (Giorgio), Valerian Ruminski (Gualtiero); Metropolitan Opera Orchestra and Chorus, Patrick Summers (conductor). DVD 2007. Label: Deutsche Grammophon
- Victor Herbert: Collected Songs – various artists (Ruminski sings seven selections). CD 2012. Label: New World Records
