= Saimir Pirgu =

Albanian opera tenor

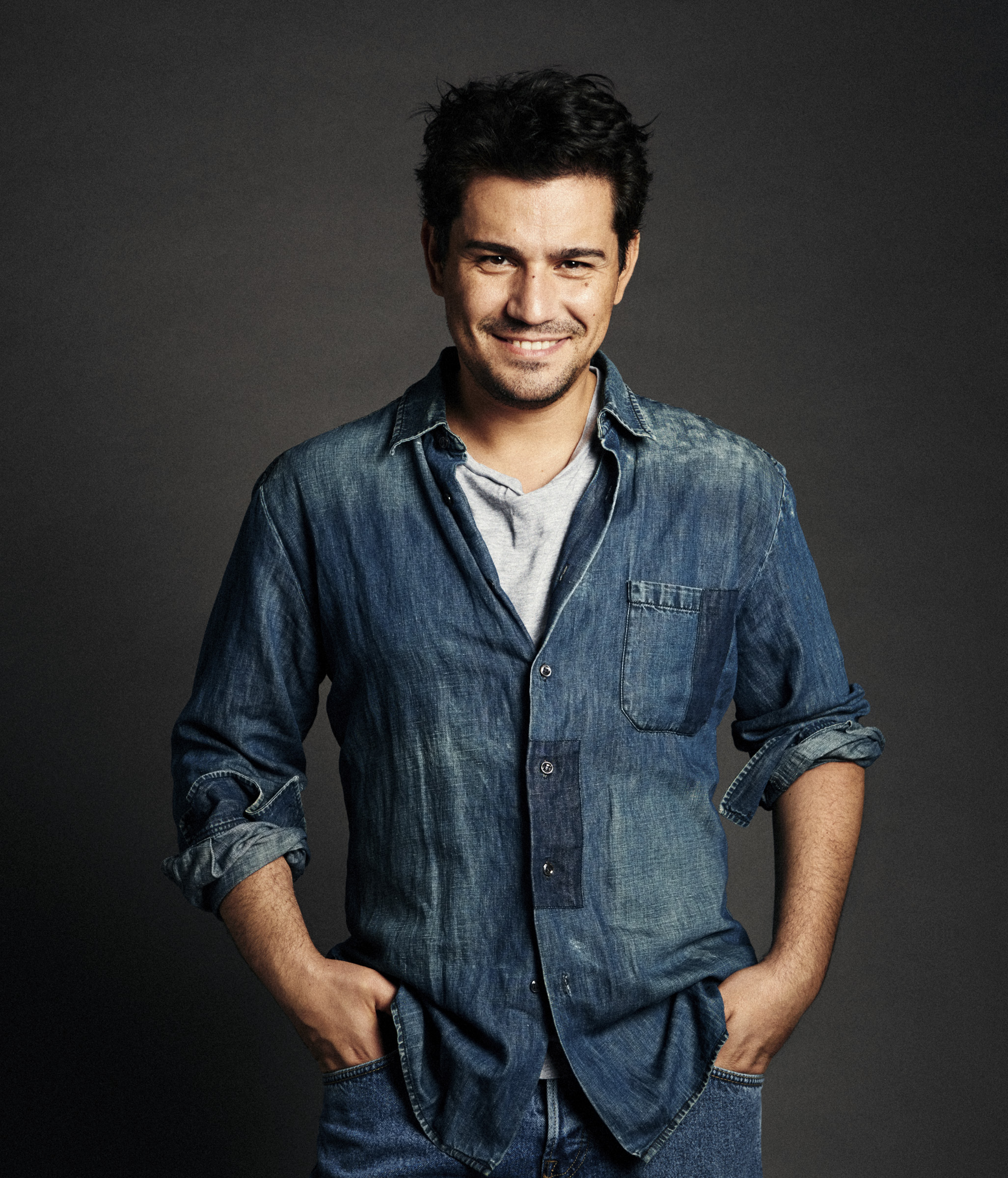
- Pirgu in 2015
- Born: September 23, 1981 (age 45); Elbasan, Albania
- Occupation: Tenor
- Years active: 2001–present
- Family: Pirgu
- Website: SaimirPirgu.com

Saimir Pirgu (born 23 September 1981 in Elbasan) is an Albanian international opera singer (tenor). In 2014 he was awarded the Italian citizenship by the President of the Italian Republic Giorgio Napolitano.

== Biography ==
Saimir Pirgu was born in Elbasan, Albania on the 23rd of September 1981. He graduated in singing at the Conservatory Claudio Monteverdi in Bolzano (Italy) where he studied with Vito Maria Brunetti.

At the age of 22 he was discovered by Claudio Abbado who chose him to play the role of Ferrando in Mozart's Così fan tutte. He collaborates with the most prestigious theaters and musical institutions in the world as: Teatro alla Scala in Milan, Opéra National de Paris, Royal Opera House, Metropolitan Opera, Vienna State Opera, Gran Teatre del Liceu, Moscow Bolshoi Theatre, Berlin State Opera and Deutsche Oper, Salzburg Festival, Vienna Musikverein, Bayerische Rundfunks in Munich, and Amsterdam Concertgebouw.

He has been directed by Riccardo Muti, Claudio Abbado, Mariss Jansons, Zubin Mehta, Nikolaus Harnoncourt, Lorin Maazel, Seiji Ozawa, Gianandrea Noseda, Daniel Barenboim, James Conlon, Antonio Pappano, Daniele Gatti.

He worked with Franco Zeffirelli, Woody Allen, Peter Stein, Graham Vick, Willy Decker, Deborah Warner, Luca Ronconi, Kasper Holten, David McVicar, Ferzan Ozpetek, Mario Martone, Michael Haneke, Robert Carsen.

Among his last appearances are: La damnation de Faust at Moscow Bolshoi Theatre, Rigoletto and King Roger at Royal Opera House London, La traviata at Metropolitan Opera New York, Santa Fe Opera and Berlin State Opera, The Magic Flute at Teatro alla Scala, L'elisir d'amore at Vienna State Opera and Deutsche Oper Berlin, Lucia di Lammermoor at Los Angeles Opera, La traviata and I Capuleti e i Montecchi at San Francisco Opera, La bohème and Lucia di Lammermoor at Washington National Opera, Un ballo in maschera in Tel Aviv, La clemenza di Tito at the Opéra national de Paris, Rigoletto at the Arena di Verona and Vienna State Opera, La bohème at Gran Teatre del Liceu, Mozart's Requiem at Symphony Center Chicago, Verdi's Requiem at Salzburg Festival, Vienna Musikverein, Bayerische Rundfunks in Munich, Pilharmonie de Paris and Amsterdam Concertgebouw.

Pirgu won the first prize in the international competitions Caruso in Milan in 2002, and Tito Schipa in Lecce in the same year. He was recognized with the Franco Corelli award in 2009 in Ancona (Italy) and with the prestigious "Pavarotti d'Oro Award" in 2013.

In December 2015, he released his album Il Mio Canto, edited by Opus Arte.

Pirgu made his debut with Opera Australia in 2017 as Shepherd in Szymanowski's King Roger at the Sydney Opera House.

=== Religious views ===
Saimir Pirgu has described himself as an atheist, although he has said "if a God exists he exists in music".

== Honors and awards ==
- 2002: First Prize at "Caruso" competition (Milan)
- 2002: First Prize at "Tito Schipa" competition (Lecce)
- 2004: "Eberhard-Waechter-Gesangsmedaille" Award (Vienna)
- 2009: "Franco Corelli" Award (Ancona)
- 2013: "Golden Pavarotti" Award
- 2016: "Çelësit të Qytetit" ("The Key of the City"), an honor of the capital of Albania, Tirana.

== Repertoire ==
- Giuseppe Verdi
  - Il Duca di Mantova – Rigoletto
  - Alfredo Germont: La traviata
  - Macduff – Macbeth
  - Fenton – Falstaff
  - Gabriele Adorno – Simon Boccanegra (2017, Teatro alla Scala)
  - Tenor – Requiem
- Gaetano Donizetti
  - Nemorino – L'elisir d'amore
  - Sir Edgardo di Ravenswood – Lucia di Lammermoor
- Wolfgang Amadeus Mozart
  - Idomeneo – Idomeneo re di Creta
  - Tito Vespasiano – La clemenza di Tito
  - Don Ottavio – Don Giovanni
  - Tamino – Die Zauberflöte
  - Ferrando – Così fan tutte
  - Tenor – Requiem
- Jules Massenet
  - Le chevalier des Grieux – Manon
  - Werther – Werther
- Charles Gounod
  - Roméo – Roméo et Juliette
  - Faust – Faust
- Giacomo Puccini
  - Rodolfo – La Bohème
  - Rinuccio – Gianni Schicchi
  - Tenor – Messa di Gloria
  - Benjamin Franklin Pinkerton – Madama Butterfly
  - Cavaradossi – Tosca
- Vincenzo Bellini
  - Tebaldo – I Capuleti e i Montecchi
- Jacques Offenbach
  - Hoffmann – Les contes d'Hoffmann
- Gioachino Rossini
  - Il cavalier Belfiore – Il viaggio a Reims
  - Tenor – Petite messe solennelle
- Franco Alfano
  - Christian – Cyrano de Bergerac
- Vicente Martín y Soler
  - Giocondo – Il burbero di buon cuore
- Sergei Rachmaninoff
  - Paolo – Francesca da Rimini
- Karol Szymanowski
  - Shepherd – Król Roger
- Pyotr Ilyich Tchaikovsky
  - Godefroy de Vaudémont – Iolanta
- Igor Stravinsky
  - Tenor – Pulcinella
- Joseph Haydn
  - Tenor – Die Schöpfung
- Antonín Dvořák
  - Tenor – Stabat Mater
- Hector Berlioz
  - Faust – La Damnation de Faust
  - Tenor – Requiem
  - Tenor – Messe solennelle

== Discography ==
- Il mio canto (Opus Arte), 2015, CD
- Szymanowski: Król Roger (Royal Opera House, staged by Kasper Holten, May 2015) Opus Arte, 2015, DVD/Blu-ray
- La traviata (Teatro di San Carlo, staged by Ferzan Özpetek, Dec 2012) CG Entertainment, 2015, Pal DVD
- Operngala (Naxos), 2015, Live CD
- G. Verdi – Rigoletto (Zürich Opernhaus 2014), 2015, DVD
- G. Verdi – Requiem (Vienna Musikverein 2013), 2014, DVD Blu-ray
- G. Verdi – Requiem (München, Bayerische Rundfunk 2013), 2014, CD
- V. Bellini – I Capuleti e i Montecchi (San Francisco Opera 2012), 2014, DVD Blu-ray
- New Year's Concert 2013 (Venice, Teatro la Fenice 2013), 2014, DVD Blu-ray
- W. A. Mozart – Die Zauberflöte (Milan, Teatro alla Scala 2011), 2012, DVD Blu-ray
- G. Puccini – La bohème im Hochhaus (Live from Berne, Switzerland, 2009), 2010, DVD
- W. A. Mozart – Idomeneo (Graz, styriarte 2008), 2009, DVD
- G. Verdi – La traviata (Opéra Royal de Wallonie, Belgium 2009) 2009, DVD
- V. Martín y Soler – Il burbero di buon cuore (Madrid, Teatro Real 2007) 2009, DVD
- V. Martín y Soler – Il burbero di buon cuore (Madrid, Teatro Real 2007) 2013, CD
- Ramon Carnicer – Elena e Costantino (Madrid, Teatro Real 2005) 2009, CD
- G. Rossini – La cambiale di matrimonio (Rossini Opera Festival 2006) 2008, DVD
- G. Rossini – La cambiale di matrimonio (Rossini Opera Festival 2006) 2007, CD
- Opera Night (Opera Cologne, for the German AIDS Foundation, 2005), 2006 DVD
- Angelo Casto e Bel (Universal), 2006, CD
