= Øystein Wiik =

Øystein Wiik (born 7 July 1956) is a Norwegian actor, singer, songwriter and novelist. He was born in Oslo. He has worked for Den Nationale Scene, Oslo Nye Teater and Det Norske Teatret, and played leading roles in several musicals. Among his albums are Too many mornings from 1991 and Stage from 1993. He published the crime novel Dødelig applaus in 2010.

He appeared in the 10th Anniversary of Les Misérables (Dream Cast) 1995.

Øystein has also written the libretto to the Norwegian musical comedy «Optimist» based on songs of Jahn Teigen which opened at Chateau Neuf in Oslo on 12 September 2019.
