= Olga Pasichnyk =

Polish-Ukrainian classical soprano singer

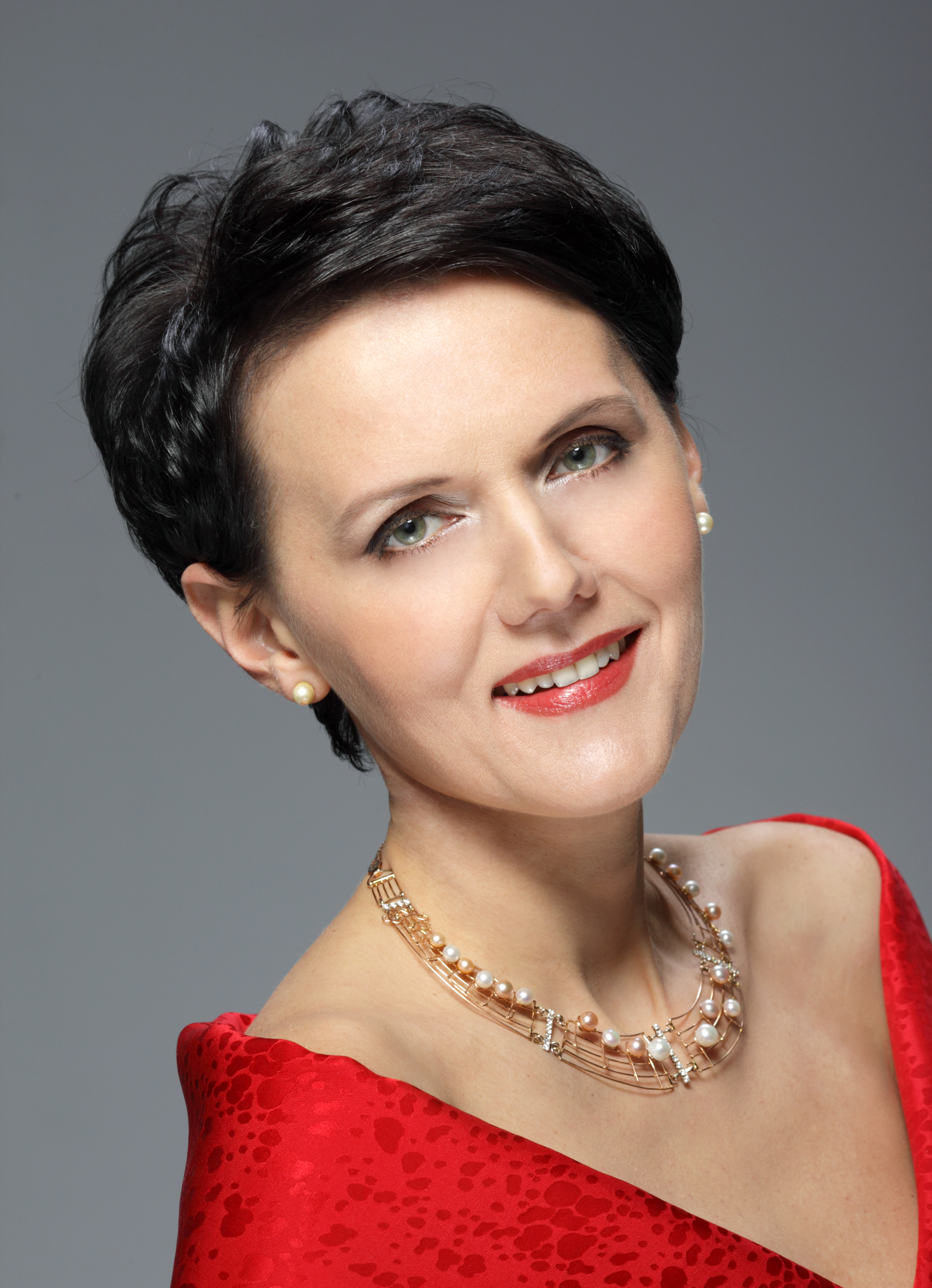
Olga Pasichnyk

Olga Pasichnyk (Ukrainian: Ольга Ігорівна Плиска-Пасічник [Olga Ihorivna Plyska-Pasichnyk]; Polish: Olga Pasiecznik; born 3 March 1968) is a Polish-Ukrainian classical soprano singer. She lives in Poland.

== Biography ==
Born in Rivne, Ukraine, Pasichnyk is the daughter of Ihor and Polish-born Jadwiga (née Antonowicz) Pasichnyk. Her father became the first rector of National University of "Academy Ostrogska" when it was revived in 1994. Her sister is the pianist Natalya Pasichnyk. She is married to Yuri Pliska, assistant professor at Warsaw University of Life Sciences.

She initially trained to be a pianist at Rivne, but moved to the Kyiv Conservatory to study singing as a soprano with Evgeniya Miroshnichenko. She then completed her postgraduate studies with Alina Bolechowska at the Fryderyk Chopin University of Music in Warsaw.

In 1992, Pasichnyk became a soloist of the Warsaw Chamber Opera, while still a student. Since then she has taken leading roles with many European opera companies, including the Paris Opera, Bavarian State Opera, Vlaamse Opera, Geneva Opera, Polish National Opera, Opéra de Lille, Teatro Real, Opéra de Nice and Opéra National du Rhin.

In parallel with her opera career, Pasichnyk performs concert works and tours widely with her sister Natalya. She has recorded extensively in both roles, with some fifty discs and DVDs.

She has won prizes at the International Vocal Competition 's-Hertogenbosch (the Netherlands, 1994), the Mirjam Helin International Singing Competition in Helsinki (Finland, 1999) and the Queen Elisabeth Music Competition (2000) as well as awards in Poland for her work at the Warsaw Opera, including the Officer's Cross of the Order of Merit of the Republic of Poland (2012).

== Selected discography ==
- Mozart, W. A.: Concert Arias ("Bella mia fiamma ...") (CD Accord, 2012)
- Pergolesi – L'Olimpiade (Deutscher Harmonia Mundi, 2011)
- Chopin – Complete songs (Naxos, 2010)
- Handel – Tre Donne – Tre Destini (PMC 2010 – DVD)
- Handel – Giulio Cesare (PMC 2008)
- Mozart – Don Giovanni (HMU, 2007)
- Jacopo Peri – L'Euridice (PMC, 2006)
- Mozart – Complete songs (PMC, 2006)
- Penderecki – Seven Gates of Jerusalem (Symphony No.7) (Naxos, 2006 – Grammy nomination 2008)
- Lutosławski – Chantefleurs et Chantefables (BeArTon, 2004)
- Handel – Athalia (Dabringhaus & Grimm, 2004)
- Mendelssohn & Dvorak songs (PMC, 2003)
- Szymanowski – King Roger (Accord, 2003)
- Dumky – Popular Ukrainian songs for voice and piano (OPUS111, 2001)
