= DomStufen-Festspiele =

Coordinates: 50°58′34″N 11°01′24″E

DomStufen-Festspiele is a theatre festival in Erfurt, Germany.
