= Wojtek Drabowicz =

Polish operatic baritone

Wojtek Drabowicz (also Wojciech Drabowicz; 24 March 1966 – 27 March 2007) was a Polish operatic baritone who was a leading performer at the Polish National Opera from 1989 through 2007. He also was active as a guest performer at major opera houses and concert stages throughout Europe.

== Biography ==
Born in Poznań, Drabowicz studied at the Academy of Music in his native city from 1984 to 1989. He won the Adam Didur-Concours competition in 1988 and both the Belvedere International Singing Competition in Vienna and the International Tchaikovsky Competition in Moscow in 1990. He made his professional opera debut in 1989 as the title hero in Pyotr Ilyich Tchaikovsky's Eugene Onegin at the Great Theatre, Poznań. He remained a regular performer at that house up until his sudden death at the age of 41 in a car accident brought about by a heart attack in 2007. He notably toured with the Polish National Opera to London in 2004 as the title hero in Karol Szymanowski's King Roger.

As a guest artist, Drabowicz was a regular visitor to the Glyndebourne Festival, where his roles included Count Almaviva in The Marriage of Figaro, Eugene Onegin, Tomsky in The Queen of Spades, and the title roles in Don Giovanni and Mazeppa. In 1991 he portrayed Moralès in Georges Bizet's Carmen at the Bregenzer Festspiele. He made his debut at La Monnaie as Guglielmo in Così fan tutte in 1995, and that same year made his first appearance at the Kiel Opera House as Pelléas in Pelléas et Mélisande. In 1998 he created Vershinin in the world premiere of Peter Eötvös's Tri sestry.
