= Mariusz Kwiecień =

Polish operatic baritone (born 1972)

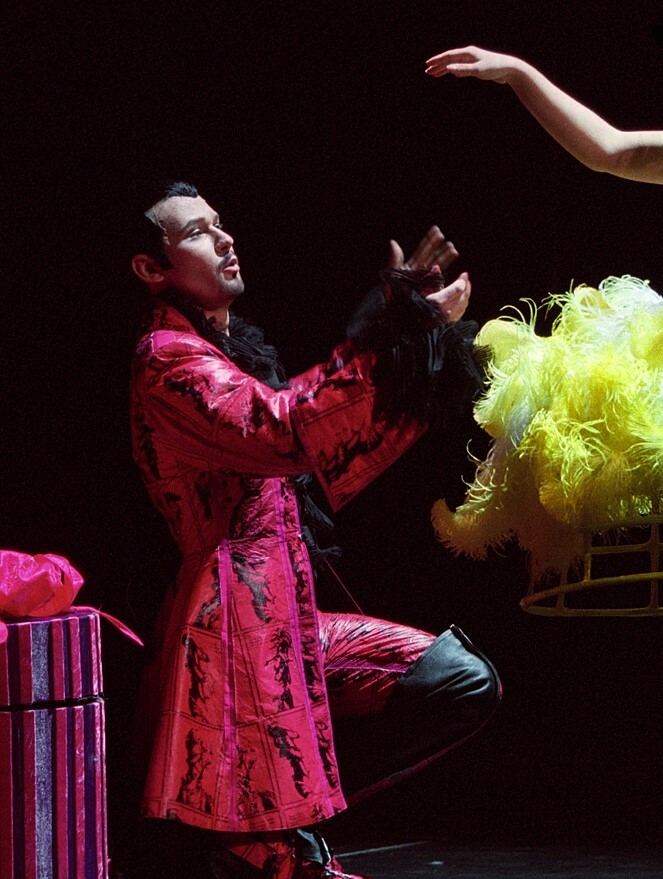
- Kwiecień in Don Giovanni at the Grand Theatre, Warsaw, 2002
- Born: 4 November 1972 (age 53); Kraków, Poland
- Education: Chopin University of Music
- Occupation: Artistic director
- Years active: 1993–present
- Website: www.mariuszkwiecien.com

Mariusz Kwiecień (Polish: [ˈmar-juʂ ˈkvjɛ-tɕɛɲ], born 4 November 1972) is a Polish artistic director and retired operatic baritone who sang leading roles in the major opera houses of Europe and North America. He received particular distinction in the title role of Mozart's Don Giovanni, which he sang at the Metropolitan Opera, Lyric Opera of Chicago, Vienna State Opera, Bilbao Opera, Houston Grand Opera, San Francisco Opera, Santa Fe Opera, Warsaw Opera, Royal Opera House, London, and Seattle Opera, where he won the company's 2006–07 Artist of the Year award for the role.

== Career ==
Kwiecień studied at the Warsaw Academy of Music and began his professional career as Aeneas in Purcell's Dido and Aeneas at the Kraków Opera in 1993. In 1995 he sang the title role in The Marriage of Figaro in Luxembourg and Poznań. He made his Warsaw Opera debut the next year as Stanisław in Moniuszko's rarely performed Verbum Nobile. Debuts in major European and American opera houses soon followed.

A former student of the Metropolitan Opera's Lindemann Young Artist Development Program, he made his Met debut in 1999 as Kuligin in Janáček's Káťa Kabanová. By 2003 he was singing leading baritone roles there, eventually giving over 200 performances, including Marcello in La bohème (2003), Silvio in Pagliacci (2004), Count Almaviva in The Marriage of Figaro (2005), Guglielmo in Così fan tutte (2005), Dr. Malatesta in Don Pasquale (2006, 2010), Enrico in Lucia di Lammermoor (2007, 2009), Belcore in L'Elisir d'Amore (2012), the title role in Eugene Onegin (2013–2017), and Zurga in The Pearl Fishers (2015–2018).

Kwiecień has won awards in several international voice competitions, including the Vienna State Opera and Hamburg State Opera Prizes in the 1996 Hans Gabor Belvedere Competition and the Mozart Interpretation Prize and Audience Choice Award in the 1998 Francisco Viñas Competition in Barcelona. He was also selected to represent Poland in the 1999 Cardiff Singer of the World competition.

In 2015, he became the recipient of the Gold Cross of Merit for his contributions to promoting Polish culture on the initiative of President of Poland Bronisław Komorowski.

In 2017, he received a Grammy Award nomination in the Best Opera Recording category for his performance in Szymanowski: Król Roger conducted by Antonio Pappano and produced by Jonathan Allen.

In September 2020 he announced his retirement from singing due to recurrent back problems. He became artistic director of the Wrocław Opera, a role he held until March 2023.

== Recordings ==
- A Night at the Opera (Kristine Jepson, Mariusz Kwiecień, Matthew Polenzani, Valerian Ruminski, Indra Thomas, Royal Philharmonic Orchestra, Charles Rosekranz), 2008, Naxos 8557309
- Brahms: Ein deutsches Requiem, Atlanta Symphony Orchestra and Chorus 2008, CD, Telarc
- Chopin. Pieśni (Songs), 2009, CD and iTunes
- Tchaikovsky: Eugene Onegin, Blu Ray and DVD 2009, a Bolshoi Theatre production filmed at Paris Opera (Palais Garnier 9/2008, Bel Air Classiques
- Donizetti: Lucia di Lammermoor, Blu Ray and DVD, Metropolitan Opera 2009, Deutsche Grammophon
- Donizetti: Don Pasquale, Blu Ray and DVD, Metropolitan Opera 2011, Deutsche Grammophon
- Slavic Heroes Arias from Russian (Eugene Onegin, Iolanta, Mazeppa, Prince Igor, Aleko, Sadko), Polish (Halka, The Haunted Manor, Verbum nobile, King Roger) and Czech (The Cunning Peasant, The Devil's Wall) operas. Polish Radio Symphony Orchestra, Lukasz Borowicz, 2012, HMF
- Mozart: Don Giovanni, Blu Ray and DVD, Royal Opera House 2014, Opus Arte
- Tchaikovsky: Eugene Onegin, Blu Ray and DVD, Metropolitan Opera 2014, Uni Dist Corp (Music)
- Szymanowski: Król Roger, Royal Opera House 2015, Opus arte
- Bizet: Les pêcheurs de perles, Blu Ray and DVD, Metropolitan Opera 2017, Warner Classics/Parlophone
- Donizetti: La Favorite, Blu Ray and DVD, Bayrische Staatoper 2017, Deutsche Grammophon/Verve Label Group
