= Wrocław Opera =

Opera house in Wrocław, Poland

Coordinates: 51.1057°N 17.0306°E

- Opera Wrocławska
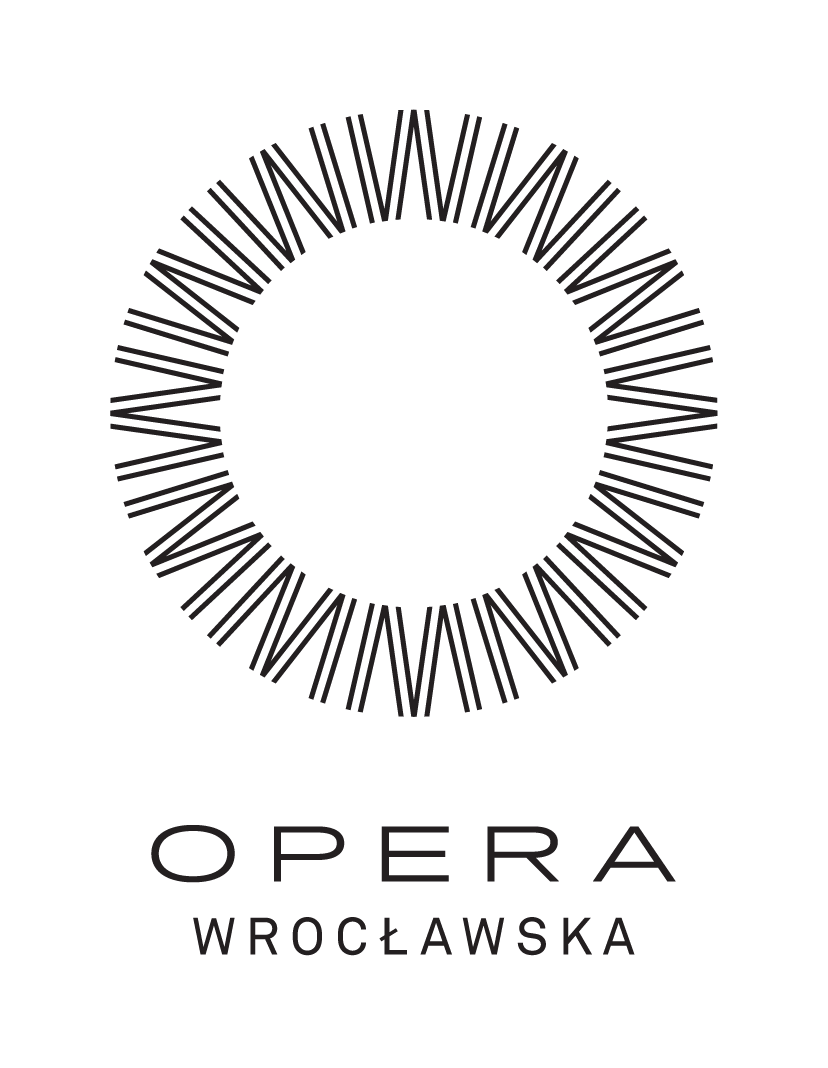

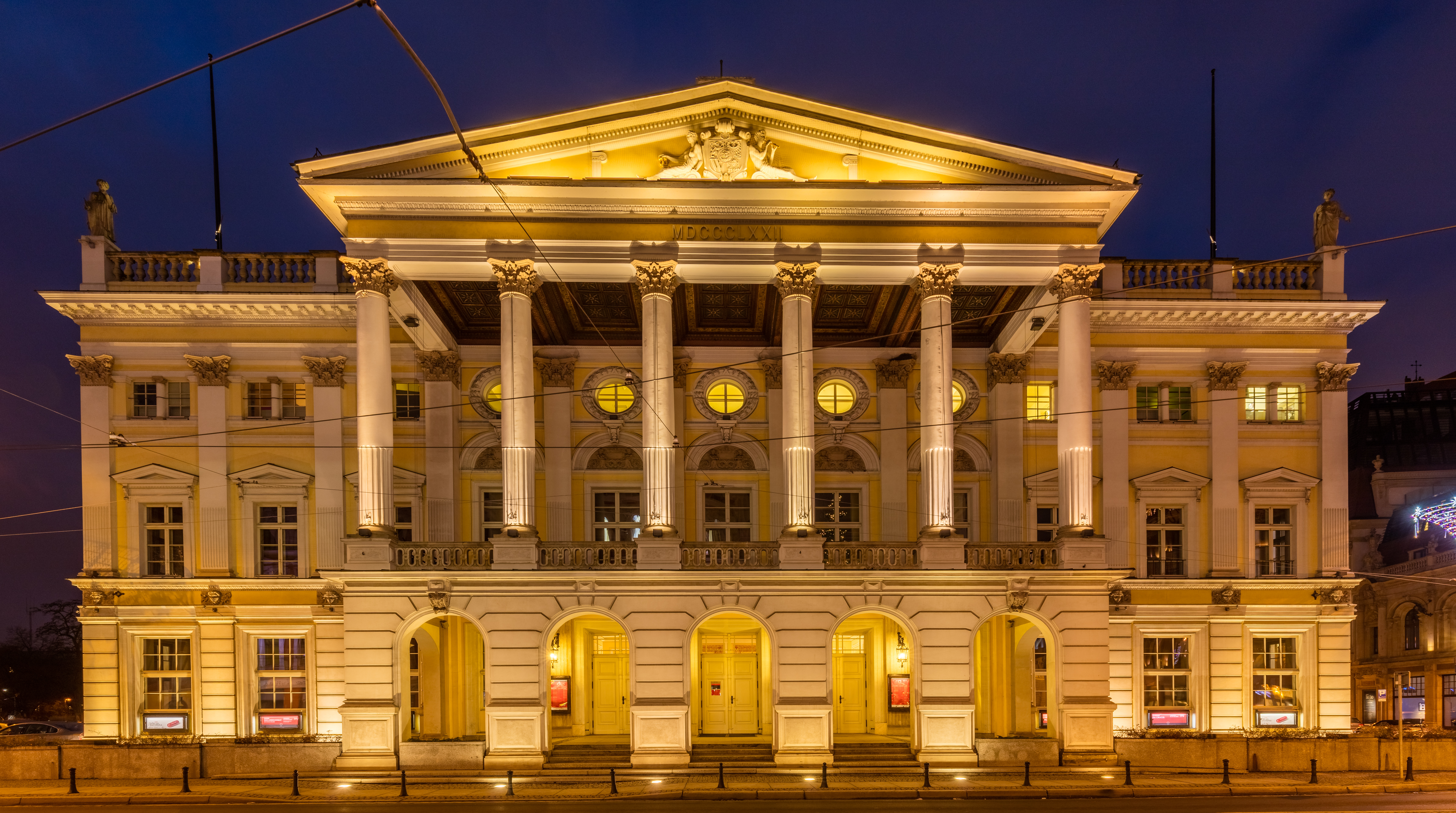
- Wrocław Opera at night
- Interactive map of Wrocław Opera
- Address: 35 Świdnicka Street; Wrocław; Poland
- Owner: Instytucja Kultury Samorządu Województwa Dolnośląskiego
- Capacity: 1600
- Type: Opera

Construction
- Opened: 1841
- Rebuilt: 1865 and 1871 (after a fire)
- Years active: 1841–present
- Architects: Carl Ferdinand Langhans (1841); Carl Johann Lüdecke (1865); Karl Schmidt (1871)

Website
- Official website

The Wrocław Opera (Polish: Opera Wrocławska, German: Oper Breslau) is an opera company and opera house in the Old Town of Wrocław, Poland, opened in 1841.

== History ==
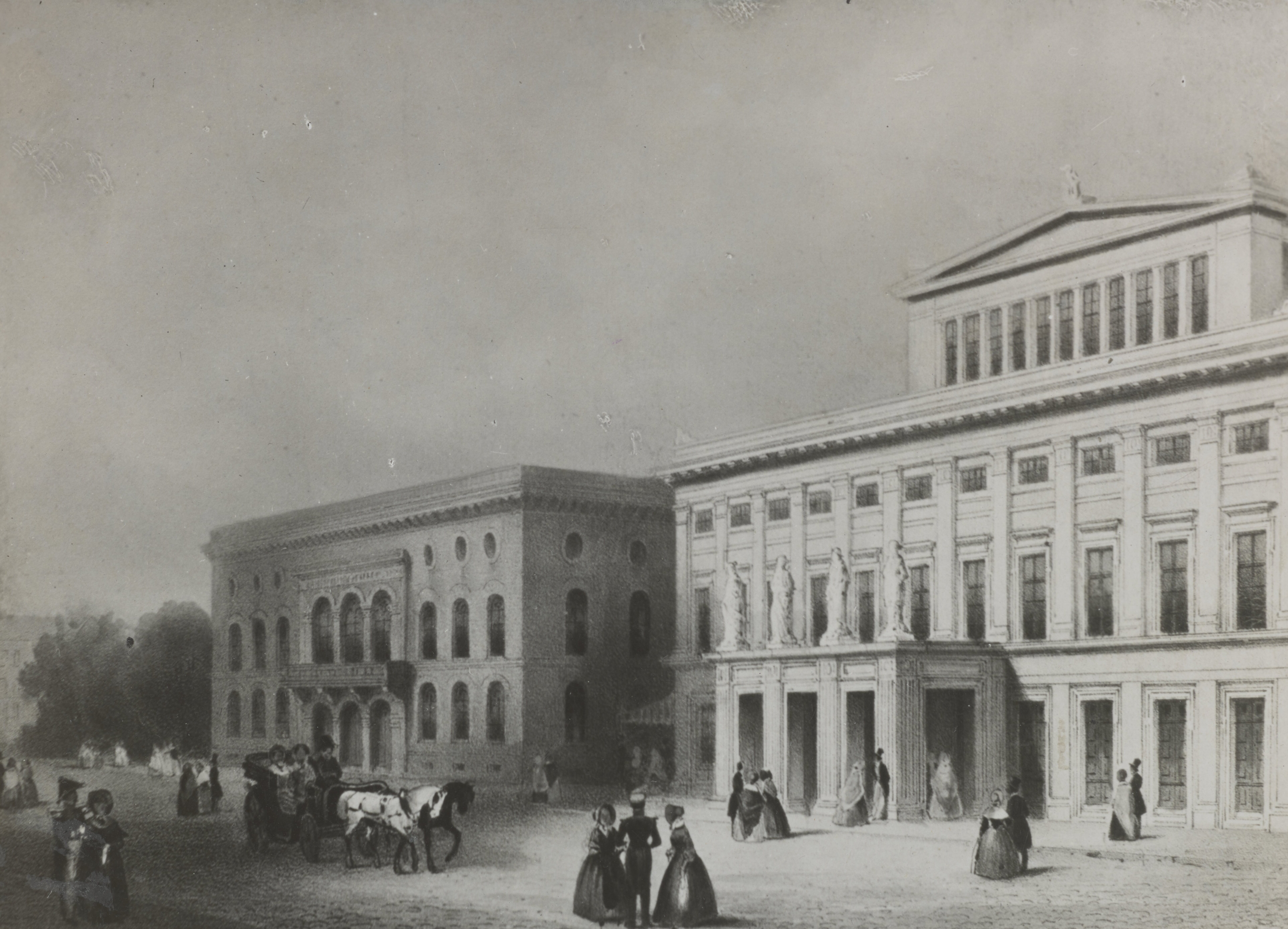
Historical image from 1910

An Italian opera company was established in Breslau in 1725 by Antonio Maria Peruzzi, following a split with Antonio Denzio with whom he had collaborated in the Peruzzi-Denzio company at the Sporck theatre in Prague. The Theater on the Cold Ashes was opened in 1755 by Franz von Schuch (1716–1764) and performed operas till his death in 1764. His son, Schuch the younger, brought the first operas of Johann Adam Hiller to the Theodor Lobe's theatre in Breslau in 1770. His successor Johann Christian Wäser introduced more, including local Singspiel translations of works by Pierre-Alexandre Monsigny. In 1804 Abbé Vogler invited Carl Maria von Weber to conduct the Breslau Opera when he was only 18. The opera house was constructed in 1841 to designs by Carl Gotthard Langhans, supervised by his son Carl Ferdinand. It was remodeled twice after fires in 1865 by Carl Johann Lüdecke and 1871 by Karl Schmidt. After the first fire, Theodor Lobe in 1867 invited the young conductor Ernst Schuch (1846–1914) to begin his career at the theatre.

After World War I notable productions during the interwar years included Schönberg's Die glückliche Hand (1928). The music directors in this period included Franz von Hoesslin who was forced to leave the city, and Germany, in 1936.

== Polish period ==
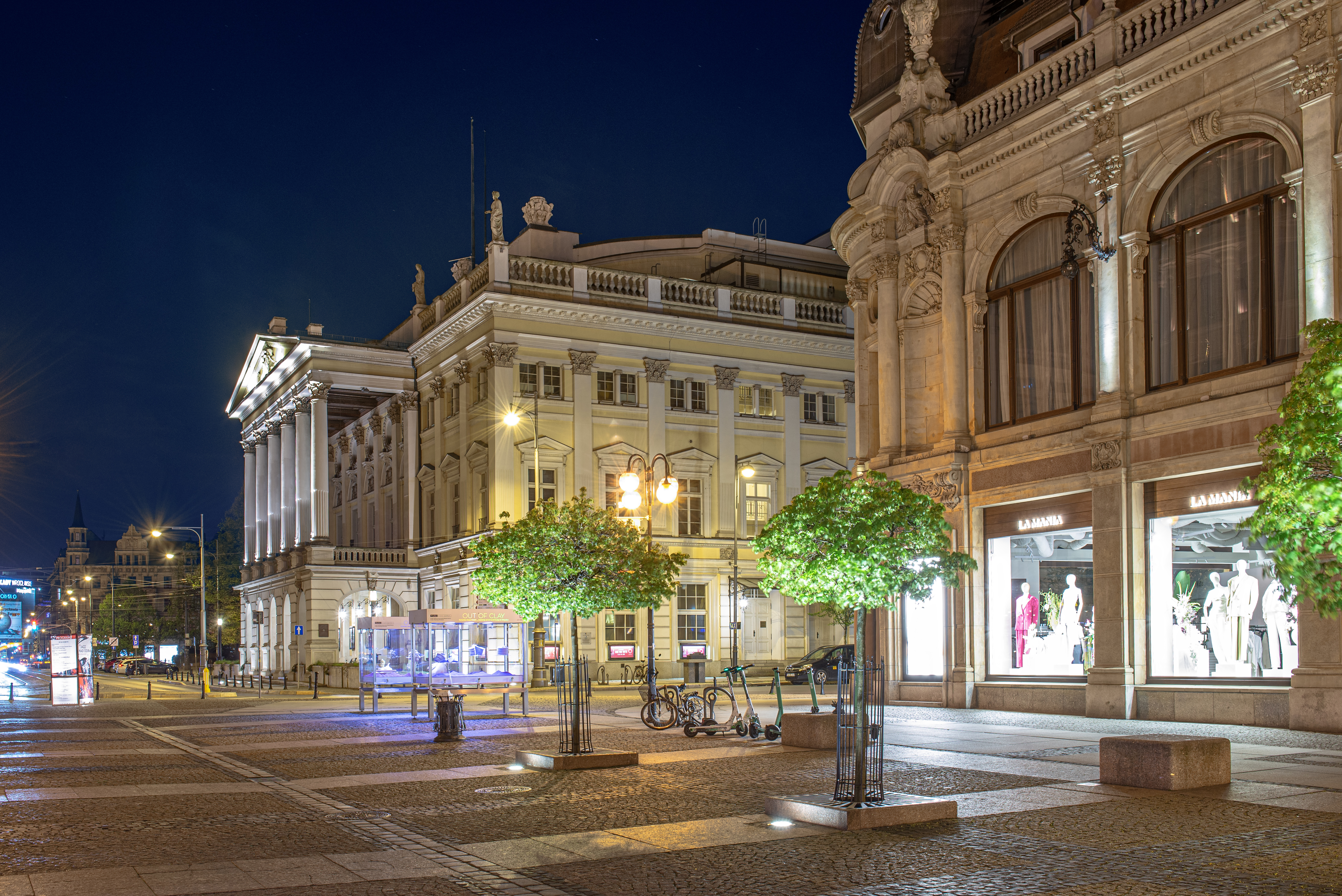
Wrocław Opera at night on Świdnicka Street

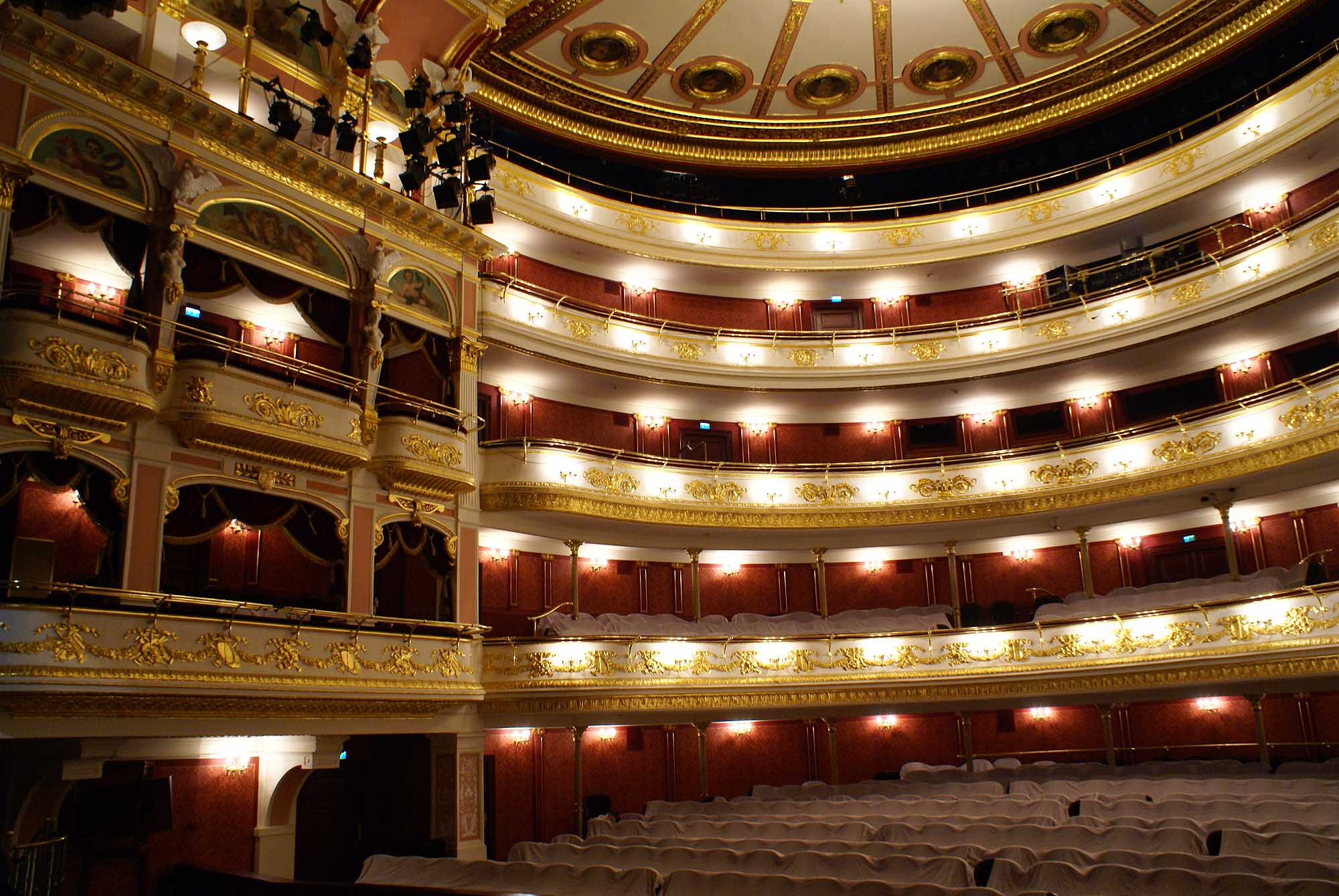
Interior of the Opera

Following the inclusion of Wrocław into Poland in 1945, the Lower Silesian Opera made its inaugural performance in post-World War II Polish Wrocław on September 8, 1945, with Stanisław Moniuszko's Halka directed by Stanisław Drabik. From 1945 to 1950 the building housed not only the Opera, but also theater, puppet theater and operetta performances. In 1997 the Director Ewa Michnik undertook the idea to use other venues during the complete rehab of the building (1997–2006). She created a series of mega-productions that took place around the city including the Centennial Hall, The National Museum courtyard and banks of the Oder River. This tradition became a trademark of Wrocław Opera and continues to this day. The super productions are famous for interesting surroundings, attractive decorations and guest actors. The Opera also organized Wagner festivals building on the tradition of Wagner's involvement with Wrocław Opera. The current repertoire of the Opera House includes Kot w butach (Puss in Boots) by Bogdan Pawłowski and Matka czarnoskrzydłych snów by Hanna Kulenty.

In 2014, the opera house received 105,451 visitors.

In 2017, Leszek Możdżer's opera Immanuel Kant based on the works of Thomas Bernhard premiered at the Wrocław Opera.

== Present-day administration ==
In July 2023, Tomasz Janczak was appointed the director of the Wrocław Opera, and Michał Znaniecki was appointed artistic director. The pair had been serving in these roles on an interim basis since March 2023, following the resignation of Halina Ołdakowska and Mariusz Kwiecień. Adam Banaszak is the opera's music director.

== Premieres ==
- Ludomir Różycki Eros und Psyche, 1914
- Leszek Możdżer Immanuel Kant, 2017

== See also ==
- Juliusz Słowacki Theatre
- Lviv Opera
