= Ewa Michnik =

Polish conductor

Ewa Barbara Michnik-Szynalska (born 15 February 1943) is a Polish conductor and artistic administrator. From 1995 until 2016 she was the chief director and artistic director for the Wroclaw Opera.

== Career ==
Michnik was born in Bochnia, a small town in the southern part of Poland in February 15, 1943. She graduated from the State Higher School of Music in 1972, and then studied under Hans Swarowsky in Vienna. From 1972-1978 she was the conductor for the Zielona Góra Philharmonic. From 1981 until 1995 she was the general and artistic director of the Krakow Opera. From 1995 until 2016 Michnik was the director of the Wrorclaw Opera in Poland. In a 2016 interview she did she noted “Entering the world of opera theater was a very important moment in my life, because opera became my passion and consumed me whole."

In 1997, Ewa started working on opera super-performances with the team of the Wroclaw Opera. She conducted all the parts of Richard Wagner’s Tetralogy, Ring of the Nibelung, Valkyrie, Siegfried, and Twilight of the Gods, she is the second woman in the world to have conducted the whole tetralogy.

As of 2022, Michnik was the only female conductor who was older than 55 to hold a permanent position as an orchestral conductor.

== Awards and honors ==
Michnik was award the title of honorary professor in musical art in 2000. In 2001, Michnik was awarded the Officer’s Cross, in 2010 she received the Commander’s Cross, and she obtained the second highest Polish civilian honour, the Commander's Cross with star, in 2016. In 2014, Michnik received the Richard Wagner Prize from the city of Leipzig.

In 2007 she was awarded the Cross of Merit on the Sash of the German Federal Republic.
