= List of operas by Franco Alfano =

This is a list of the operas by Franco Alfano (1876–1954).

== List ==
Title	Genre	Subdivisions	Libretto	Première date	Place, theatre	Notes
Miranda		2 acts	composer		unperformed	Composed 1896. After Miranda by Fogazzaro.
La fonte di Enschir	opera seria	2 acts	Luigi Illica	8 November 1898	Wrocław, Stadttheater	Performed in German.
Risurrezione	dramma lirico	4 acts	Cesare Hanau and Camillo Antona Traversi	30 November 1904	Turin, Teatro Vittorio Emanuele	After Resurrection by Tolstoy.
Il principe Zilah	dramma lirico	1 prologue, 2 acts and 1 epilogue	Luigi Illica	3 February 1909	Genoa, Teatro Carlo Felice	After Jules Claretie.
I cavalieri e la bella		3 acts	Giuseppe Adami and Tomaso Monicelli			Composed 1910. Unfinished.
L'ombra di Don Giovanni	dramma lirico	3 acts	Ettore Moschino	2 April 1914	Milan, Teatro alla Scala	
La leggenda di Sakuntala		3 acts	composer	10 December 1921	Bologna, Teatro Comunale	After Abhijñānaśākuntalam by Kālidāsa.
Madonna Imperia	commedia musicale	1 act	Arturo Rossato	15 May 1927	Turin, Teatro di Torino	After La Belle Imperia by Balzac.
L'ultimo Lord	opera semiseria	3 acts	Ugo Falena and Arturo Rossato	19 April 1930	Naples, Teatro San Carlo	After Little Lord Fauntleroy by Frances Hodgson Burnett.
Cyrano de Bergerac	commedia eroica	4 acts	Henri Caïn	22 January 1936	Rome, Teatro dell'Opera	After Rostand. Italian translation by Cesare Meano and Filippo Brusa.
Don Juan de Manara	dramma lirico	3 acts	Ettore Moschino	12 June 1941	Florence, Teatro Comunale	New version of L'ombra di Don Giovanni.
Il dottor Antonio	opera	3 acts	Mario Ghisalberti	30 April 1949	Rome, Teatro dell'Opera	After Dottor Antonio by Giovanni Ruffini.
Vesuvius	opera for radio		Vittorio Viviani	13 November 1950	Transmitted by RAI	
Sakùntala		3 acts	composer	9 January 1952	Roma, Teatro dell'Opera	Reconstruction of La leggenda di Sakuntala.

== Sources ==
- John C.G. Waterhouse, Alfano, Franco, in New Grove Dictionary of Music and Musicians, 2001
- Alberto Pironti, Alfano, Franco in Dizionario Biografico degli Italiani, Volume 2 (1960)
