= Doctor Antonio =

Doctor Antonio (Italian:Il dottor Antonio) may refer to:

- Doctor Antonio (novel), an 1855 novel by the Italian writer Giovanni Ruffini
- Doctor Antonio (1914 film), an Italian silent film
- Doctor Antonio (1937 film), an Italian sound film
- Il dottor Antonio (opera), a 1949 work by Franco Alfano
- Doctor Antonio (TV series), an Italian television series broadcast in 1954
