= Irene Roberts =

Irene Roberts may refer to:

- Irene Roberts (Home and Away), fictional character from Home and Away
- Irene Roberts (singer) (born 1983), American mezzo-soprano
- Irene Roberts (physician-scientist), British pediatric hematologist
