= René Maison =

Belgian opera singer

René Maison (24 November 1895 – 11 July 1962) was a prominent Belgian operatic tenor, particularly associated with heroic roles of the French, Italian and German repertories.

== Career ==
Born in Frameries, Belgium, he studied in Brussels and Paris. He made his debut in Geneva in 1920, as Rodolfo in La bohème. He also appeared in Nice and Monte Carlo, before making his debut in 1927, at the Opéra-Comique in Paris, as Prince Dimitri in Franco Alfano's Risurrezione, opposite the soprano Mary Garden. His other roles there included Don José, Mylio, Werther, Canio, Cavaradossi, and Jean Gaussin in Massenet's Sapho.

He made his Paris Opéra debut at the Palais Garnier in 1929, in Henry Février's Monna Vanna. He sang there regularly until 1940, as Faust, Lohengrin, Radames, Siegmund and Samson. In 1934, he created there the role of Eumolphe in Stravinsky's Perséphone.

Maison also enjoyed a successful international career, appearing at the Chicago Civic Opera (1928–40), the Teatro Colón in Buenos Aires (1934–37), the Royal Opera House, Covent Garden, in London (1931–36), and the Metropolitan Opera in New York. His Met debut occurred on 3 February 1936, as Stolzing in Die Meistersinger von Nürnberg. In eight seasons with the Met he sang Don José, Lohengrin, Samson, Julien, Florestan, Hoffmann, des Grieux and Herodes, among other roles.

In 1943, he began teaching voice at the Juilliard School in New York, and from 1957 until his death, at the Chalof School in Boston. Among his pupils was the baritone turned dramatic tenor Ramon Vinay.

Maison died in Le Mont-Dore, France, aged 66. He was, in terms of birth dates, the middle member of a triumvirate of outstanding Belgian operatic tenors who reached their peak in the period between the two world wars. The others were the lyric-dramatic tenor Fernand Ansseau (1890–1972) and the lyric tenor Andre D'Arkor (1901–1971).

== Sources ==
- Dictionnaire des interprètres, Alain Pâris, (Éditions Robert Laffont, 1989) ISBN 2-221-06660-X
