= Danny Ionescu =

Aquatic microbial ecologist

- דני יונסקו
- Born: 2 July 1976 (age 50); Bucharest, Romania
- Education: School of Marine Sciences (B.Sc.); Hebrew University of Jerusalem (PhD); Max Planck Institute for Marine Microbiology
- Spouse: Mina Bizic
- Children: 2
- Scientific career
- Fields: Microbiology, Environmental science
- Workplaces: Technische Universität Berlin; Max Planck Institute for Marine Microbiology; Leibniz Institute of Freshwater Ecology and Inland Fisheries
- Thesis: Cyanobacterial Biogeography and Nitrogen Fixation: Lessons from environmental and model organisms (2009)

Danny Ionescu (Hebrew: דני יונסקו) is an aquatic microbial ecologist leading a research group in the department of Environmental Microbiomics at the Technische Universität Berlin. His primary research focus centers around the biology of giant bacteria and microbial life in the Dead Sea.

== Education and career ==
Between 2000 and 2003, Ionescu earned a BSc degree in Marine Sciences and Marine Environmental Sciences from the School of Marine Sciences at the Ruppin Academic Center in Israel.

His academic journey continued with a master's degree between 2003 and 2005, conducted under the guidance of Prof. Aharon Oren at the Hebrew University of Jerusalem, in collaboration with Prof. Karlheinz Altendorf and Dr. Andre Lipski at the University of Osnabrueck in Germany. His Master's thesis, titled "Characterization of an endoevaporitic microbial community in the Eilat salterns by fatty acid analysis and stable isotope labeling", reflected his research focus during this period.

=== Ph.D. and postdoctoral research ===
In 2005, Ionescu embarked on a Ph.D. degree at the Hebrew University of Jerusalem, as part of the peace project "Bridging the Rift", in collaboration with Prof. Muna Hindiyeh and Prof. Mohhamad Wedyan. His doctoral thesis was titled "Cyanobacterial Biogeography and Nitrogen Fixation: Lessons from environmental and model organisms".

During his first postdoctoral research, starting in 2009, at the Max Planck Institute for Marine Microbiology in Bremen, Ionescu led the first scientific diving exploration of the Dead Sea.

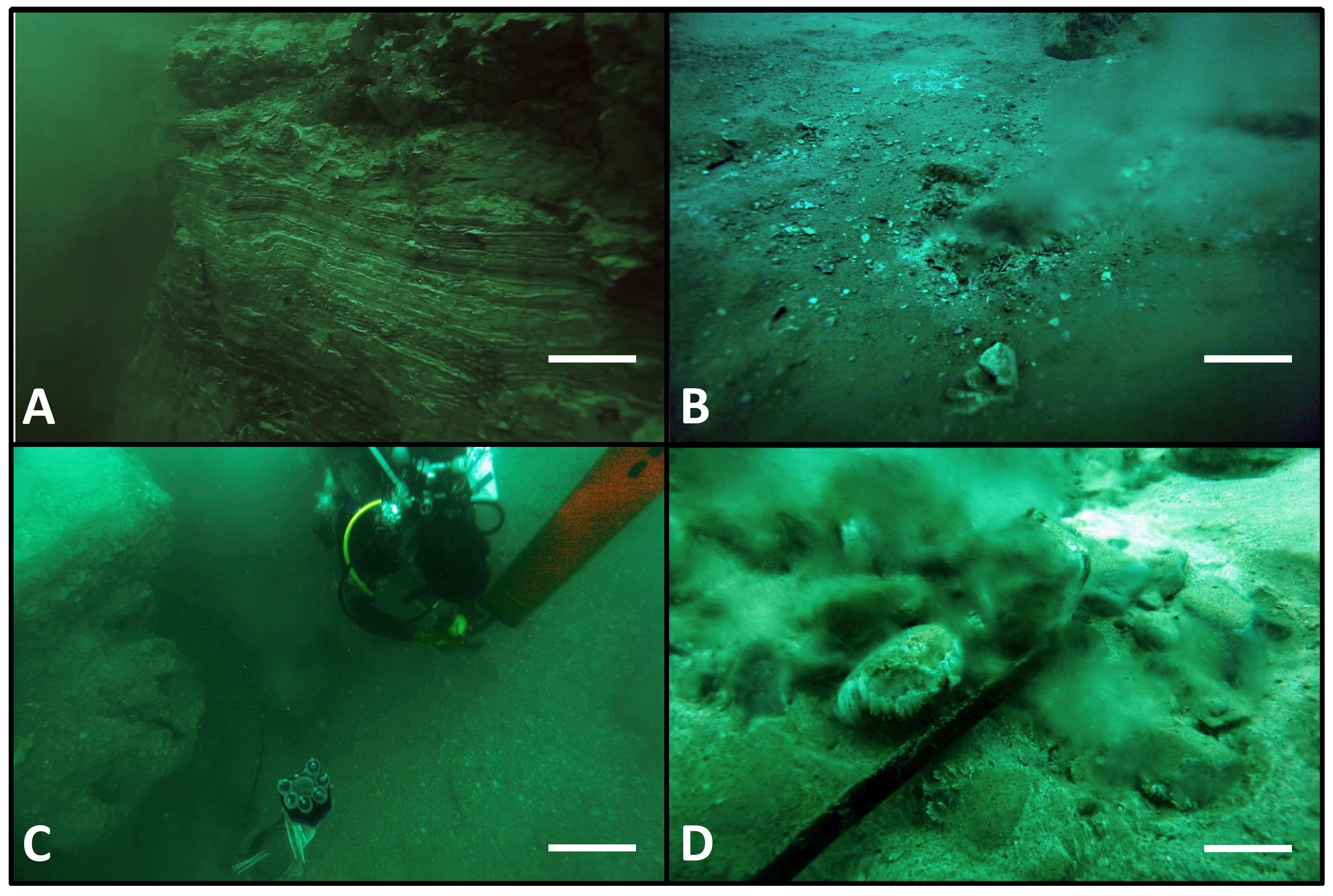
Four photographs of a series of underwater fresh water springs found in the Dead Sea, approximately 1.8 km west of Mitzpe Shalem, in 2010 by Danny Ionescu

The expedition revealed abundant microbial life forms in and around underwater freshwater springs. The underwater scenery of the Dead Sea as documented by Ionescu and Dr. Christian Lott of the Hydra Institute was featured in several documentary movies.

His work at the Max Planck Institute included studies on the interaction between minerals and microbial cells, conducted Äspö Hard Rock Laboratory in Sweden and on the island of Kiritimati, as part of the collaborative researcher group FOR571.

Between 2014 and 2024, Ionescu conducted his research at the Leibniz Institute of Freshwater Ecology and Inland Fisheries (IGB), where his research focused on the genomics and ecology of giant bacteria, specifically the genus Achromatium. Notably, in 2017, Ionescu discovered that the multiple chromosomes harbored by these large bacteria are not identical, highlighting their adaptability to different environments.

In 2021, Ionescu has received the independent research grant from the German Research Foundation (DFG) to further explore these topics.

== Academic contributions ==
Ionescu has made significant contributions to the field of aquatic microbial ecology. A comprehensive list of his publications can be found on his ORCID and Google Scholar pages.

Additionally, Ionescu actively participates in the scientific community. He serves on the Managing Board of the open access research platform PCI Genomics and contributes as a recommender for PCI Microbiology. Moreover, he holds positions as an associate editor for Frontiers in Microbiology and editorial board member of Scientific Reports.

== Personal life ==
Born in Bucharest, Romania, in 1976, Ionescu and his family immigrated to Israel in 1984. He is married to Dr. Mina Bizic, also a scientist, and the couple has two children. Ionescu's brother, Ariel Ionescu, is a Neurobiologist, and his brother-in-law, David Bizic, is an opera singer.

Ionescu is a certified SSI Gold level diving instructor
