= Victória Pitts =

Brazilian operatic mezzo-soprano (born 1991)

- Born: 1991 (age 33–34); Belém, Brazil
- Occupation: Operatic mezzo-soprano

Ana Victória Pitts (born 1991) is a Brazilian mezzo-soprano who has performed internationally.

== Career ==
Pitts was born in Belém in 1991 and was first trained there. From 2008, she studied at the Conservatório Carlos Gomes. She made her stage debut in Belém in 2010 as Dido in Purcell's Dido and Aeneas. She received a scholarship and continued her studies in Italy from 2011 at the Rovigo conservatoire, where she graduated in 2014. In 2011, Pitts won the Young Promise Award at the International Sacred Music Competition in Rome. In 2014, she made her European debut in the world premiere of Paolo Furlani's The Water Babies at the Teatro Sociale di Rovigo.

Pitts was a member of the studio of the Maggio Musicale Fiorentino from 2015 to 2017, where she appeared in Ullmann's Der Kaiser von Atlantis, as Hänsel in Humperdinck's Hänsel und Gretel, Flora in Verdi's La Traviata, and Tisbe in Rossini's La Cenerentola. She performed the alto part in Mozart's Requiem at the Maggio Musicale with the festival choir and the Orchestra della Toscana conducted by Daniele Rustioni. She took part in tours of Oman and Tunisia. She also performed as Isabella in Rossini's L'italiana in Algeri and as Tangia in Gluck's Le cinesi. She recorded the role of Publia in Rossini's Aureliano in Palmira in a live performance from the 2017 Rossini Festival in Wildbad, with Juan Francisco Gatell in the title role. She appeared as Emilia in Verdi's Otello at the Teatro da Paz in Belém, as Marianna in Rossini's Il Signor Bruschino at the Teatro Olimpico in Vicenza, and as Carlotta in Salieri's La scuola de' gelosi at the Teatro Salieri of Legnago.

In 2018, she appeared at the Opera de Lyon for the first time, as Vecchietta and Duchessa in Respighi's La bella dormente nel bosco. In 2022, she portrayed characters in all three parts of Puccini's Il Trittico at the Oper Frankfurt in a 2008 production directed by Claus Guth and conducted by Pier Giorgio Morandi. In Il tabarro, she performed as Frugola, in Suor Angelica as the Duchess, and in Gianni Schicchi as Zita; She appeared alongside Željko Lučić and Elza van den Heever in leading roles. A reviewer from noted that she was a powerful presence in voice and expression ("mit einer starken Präsenz an Stimme und Ausdruck").

== Recordings ==
=== Video ===
- Alfano: Risurrezione. (Dynamic 2020.)

Anne Sophie Duprels as Katerina Mihaylovna (Katyusha), Matthew Vickers as Prinz Dimitri Ivanovitch Nehlyudov, Leon Kim as Simonson, Francesca Di Sauro as Sofia Ivanovna, Romina Tomasoni as Matryova Pavlovna/Anna, Nadia Pirazzini as Maidservant, Ana Victória Pitts as Vera/Korablyova, Barbara Marcacci as Fenyichka. Orchestra and choir of the Maggio Musicale Fiorentino. Conductor: Francesco Lanzillotta. Staging: Rosetta Cucchi. Video: Davide Mancini. Recorded on the 17th and 21st of January, 2020.
