= Hooray for Love (film) =

- Directed by: Walter Lang
- Screenplay by: Lawrence Hazard, Ray Harris
- Based on: The Show Must Go On by Marc Lachmann
- Produced by: Felix Young
- Starring: Ann Sothern; Gene Raymond; Maria Gambarelli; Bill Robinson; Pert Kelton; Thurston Hall
- Cinematography: Lucien Andriot
- Music by: Alberto Colombo
- Production company: RKO Radio Pictures
- Release date: June 14, 1935 (US)
- Running time: 75 minutes
- Country: United States

Hooray for Love is a 1935 American musical comedy film directed by Walter Lang from a screenplay by Lawrence Hazard and Ray Harris, which was based on an unpublished story by Marc Lachmann titled The Show Must Go On. The film was released by RKO Pictures on June 14, 1935, with music by Jimmy McHugh and lyrics by Dorothy Fields.

== Plot summary ==
A wealthy young man falls hard for a beautiful showgirl, and her wily father quickly realizes the naïve boy would make the perfect investor for his daughter’s new show.

== Cast ==
- Ann Sothern as Patricia Thatcher
- Gene Raymond as Douglas Tyler
- Bill Robinson as himself
- Maria Gambarelli as Maria Ganbarell
- Thurston Hall as Commodore Jason Thatcher
- Pert Kelton as Trixie Chummy
- Georgia Caine as Magenta P. 'The Countess' Schultz
- Lionel Stander as Chowsky
- Etienne Girardot as Judge Peterby
- Fats Waller as himself
