= Doctor Antonio (novel) =

1855 novel by Giovanni Ruffini

- Author: Giovanni Ruffini
- Language: English
- Genre: Romance novel
- Publication date: 1855
- Media type: Print

Doctor Antonio (Italian: Il dottor Antonio) is a novel by the Italian writer Giovanni Ruffini which was first published in 1855. Ruffini was an Italian patriot who wished to secure British support for Italian Unification and wrote the work specifically to win over the British market to the cause. It was first published in English in Edinburgh in 1855, and helped drive a boom in British tourism on the Ligurian coast and in the town of Bordighera in particular.

== Synopsis ==
A revolutionary battling against the rule of Ferdinand II of the Two Sicilies meets and falls in love with the daughter of an English aristocrat. He eventually is compelled to give her up and return to fight and die for the cause of Italian unification.

== Adaptations ==
The novel has served as the inspiration for a number of different adaptations. Three films have been made, with two silent films released in 1910 and 1914 respectively and a 1937 sound version Doctor Antonio directed by Enrico Guazzoni at the Cinecittà Studios. In 1949 the story served as the basis of the libretto for Franco Alfano's last opera Doctor Antonio.

In 1954 it was made into a television series Doctor Antonio by RAI. It was the first literary adaptation to be broadcast on Italian television.

== Bibliography ==
- Alù, Giorgia. Beyond the Traveller's Gaze: Expatriate Ladies Writing in Sicily (1848-1910). Peter Lang, 2008.
- Buonanno, Milly. Italian TV Drama and Beyond: Stories from the Soil, Stories from the Sea. Intellect Books, 2012.
