= Ennio Cerlesi =

Italian actor (1901–1951)

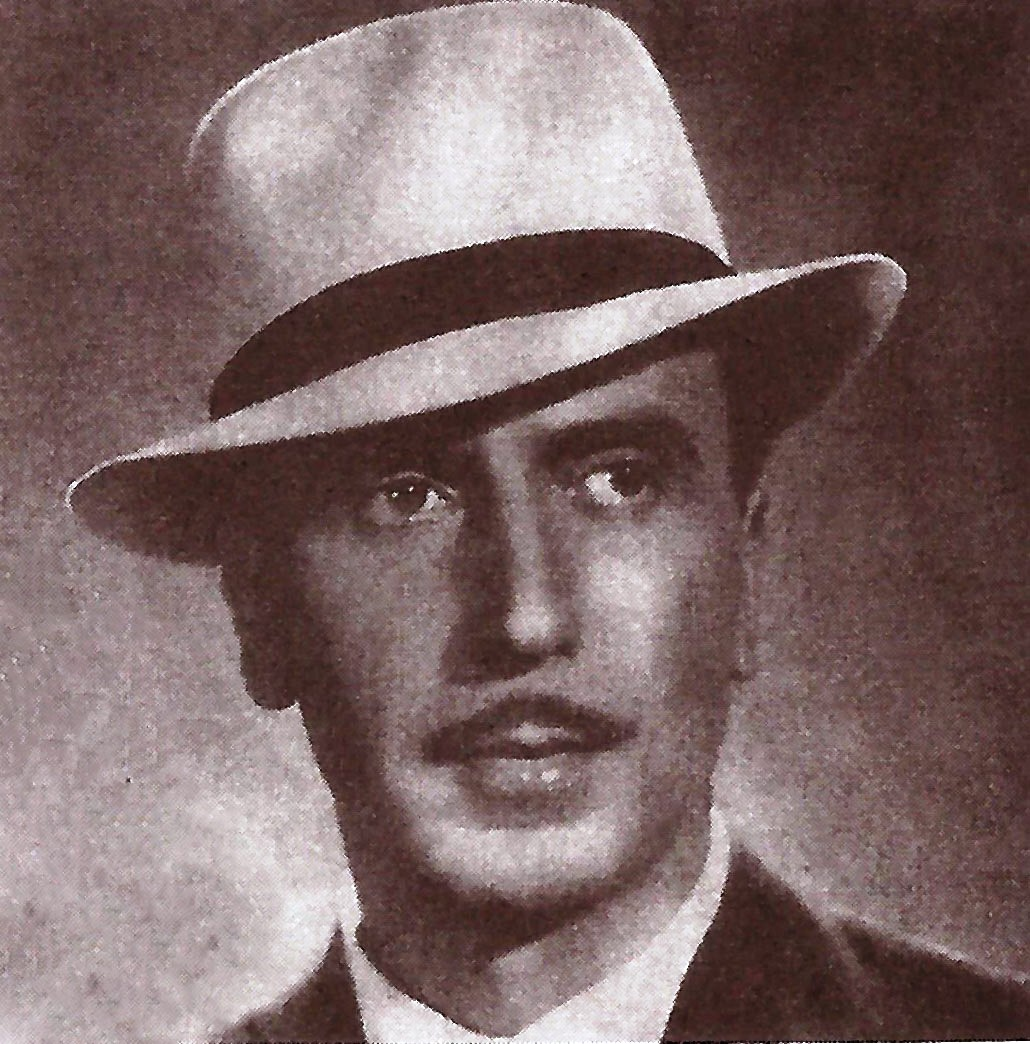
- Cerlesi in 1940
- Born: 21 January 1901; Turin, Kingdom of Italy
- Died: 20 September 1951 (aged 50); Rome, Italy
- Occupation: Actor
- Years active: 1932–1951
- Spouse: Emma Baron (m. 1936)

Ennio Cerlesi (21 January 1901 – 20 September 1951) was an Italian film actor. He played the title role in the 1937 film Doctor Antonio. Cerlesi was also a leading voice actor, dubbing international films for release in Italy. He also directed the 1946 film One Between the Crowd. Cerlesi was married to actress Emma Baron, who was also a frequent partner on stage.

== Selected filmography ==
- The Blue Fleet (1932)
- Golden Arrow (1935)
- Doctor Antonio (1937)
- Giuseppe Verdi (1938)
- Naples Will Never Die (1939)
- The Black Panther (1942)
- The Ten Commandments (1945)

== Sources ==
- Goble, Alan. The Complete Index to Literary Sources in Film. Walter de Gruyter, 1999.
