= Matthew Vickers =

American opera singer

Matthew Ryan Vickers (born 1985) is an American operatic tenor from Telford, Pennsylvania, who performs internationally in leading roles from the tenore spinto repertoire. His most frequently performed roles are Alfredo Germont in La traviata, B. F. Pinkerton in Madama Butterfly, and Rodolfo in La bohème.

== Life and education ==
Vickers attended Christopher Dock Mennonite High School, where he began singing in the school choir. He performed in his first opera at the age of 20, appearing as a chorus member in Leoncavallo's Pagliacci. He studied at Lynchburg College, graduating with a Bachelor of Music in 2009. He went on to study Italian singing at the Penn State School of Music at Pennsylvania State University with Graham Sanders, receiving his Master of Music in Voice Performance in 2012. That same year, he sang in the American Institute for Musical Studies competition in Graz, winning 3rd prize. In subsequent years he was a finalist in the 2013 Metropolitan Opera National Council Auditions, the district of Philadelphia, and the 2014 Washington, D.C. region competition. In 2015 he came third in the Annapolis Opera Vocal Competition, and received a young alumni award from Dock Menonite Academy. He performed the roles of Rodolfo in La bohème with the Penn State Opera Theatre and Turiddu in Cavalleria rusticana with the Minnesota Concert Opera. He became an apprentice artist at the Sarasota Opera in 2015 and a studio artist the following year.

== Career ==
Vickers made his official opera debut while he was still a studio artist, stepping in as Arrigo in Verdi's La battaglia di Legnano after the first scene. In the same year, he also attracted attention in the role of Laerte in Franco Faccio's Amleto with Opera Delaware, in the titlerole in L'amico Fritz with Boston Midsummer Opera, and in his debut as Don José in Carmen with Opera Western Reserve.

In 2017, his portrayal of Avito in Italo Montemezzi's rarely performed opera L'amore dei tre re garnered attention to the spinto qualities of his voice. He made guest appearances with numerous other role debuts, including Sam Polk in Susannah at Opera Roanoke, Luigi in Il tabarro with the Opera Company of Middlebury, the Duke of Mantua in Rigoletto at Charlottesville Opera, Arnold in Guillaume Tell at Opera Southwest, and Edgardo in Lucia di Lammermoor with Opera Western Reserve. Renato des Grieux in Manon Lescaut at Sarasota Opera and B. F. Pinkerton in Madama Butterfly at Opera Memphis followed in 2018.

Vickers, who had specialised in Italian operas in the USA, made his debut in Italy in French, performing as Don José in the French opera Carmen at the Macerata Opera Festival in the Sferisterio di Macerata arena in the summer of 2019. The performance also marked the Italian debuts of Irene Roberts in the title role and David Bižić as Escamillo, and was aired live on Rai 3 radio. Soon after, Vickers was able to showcase his Italian skills in Italy as a last-minute jump in for the Duca di Mantova in Rigoletto. Returned to the US, he debuted as Canio in Pagliacci with the Savannah Opera and as Cavaradossi in Tosca with the Virginia Opera. He won a grant at the Giulio Gari International Vocal Competition in the same year.

In January 2020, Vickers sang the role of the Prince Dimitri in Alfano's Risurrezione in Rosetta Cucchi's staging at the Maggio Musicale Fiorentino festival, which was released on DVD.

Other planned performances planned for the year that became the first of the COVID-19 pandemic were canceled, including a production of Carmen by Vicker's alma mater, the Penn State School of Music. The 50th anniversary celebration of AIMS in Graz, Austria, at which he had been invited to perform, was also canceled due to COVID-19. However, Vickers sang in the pandemic-friendly open-air concerts Drive-Through Arias and Opera Jukebox by Opera Delaware, which was celebrating its 75th anniversary.

In 2021, Vickers made his house and role debut as Malcolm in David McVicar's staging of Verdi's Macbeth at the Lyric Opera of Chicago, conducted by Enrique Mazzola, and starring Sondra Radvanovsky as Lady Macbeth. In 2022, he made his role debut as Foresto in Attila at Sarasota Opera, as Maurizio in Adriana Lecouvreur at Opera Baltimore, and as Romeo in Riccardo Zandonai's Giulietta e Romeo with New York's Teatro Grattacielo. In November 2022, he sang the role of Charlie Silver in the world premiere of Craig Carnahan's Requiem for Frankie Silver, with a libretto by Craig Fields. The production was staged and conducted by Carnahan, and featured soprano Lauren Senden in the title role. In 2023, Vickers sang the role of Pollione in Norma with Opera Tampa, and the role of Alfredo in La traviata in a joint production by Opera Delaware and Opera Baltimore.

Vickers moved to Germany to join the soloists' ensemble at the Staatstheater Darmstadt in 2023. Once more he made his role debut, house debut and country debut in French, in the title role of Offenbach's Les contes d'Hoffmann, conducted by Generalmusikdirektor (GMD) Daniel Cohen. His first Italian language role in Darmstadt was Alfredo in La traviata, he also sang this role as a guest at the Theater Osnabrück that same season. In 2024, Vickers sang Aegisth in Elektra in a staging by Karsten Wiegand, the intendant of Staatstheater Darmstadt. He also made his house debuts at Staatstheater Meiningen in the title role in Don Carlos in French in Achim Freyer's staging, conducted by GMD Killian Farrell, and as Pinkerton in Madama Butterfly at the Landestheater Eisenach. The following year, in 2025, he debuted in the same role at the Stadttheater Heilbronn and the Theater Koblenz. Also in 2025, Vickers sang Melot in Wagner's Tristan und Isolde at the Staatstheater Darmstadt, in the staging by Eva-Maria Höckmayr, with Magdalena Anna Hofmann as Isolde and Heiko Börner as Tristan. Vickers sang Masaniello in Auber's La muette de Portici in Paul Georg Dittrich's staging, with Megan Marie Hart as Elvire and Ricardo Garcia as Alfonso. He sang the Drum Major in Berg's Wozzeck in Wiegand's staging, with Oliver Zwarg in the title role, and GMD Cohen conducting. At the beginning of the 2025/2026 season, Vickers debuted in the role of Radamès in Aida alongside Hart in the title role, and Aris Argiris as Amonasro in a co-production between the Staatstheater Darmstadt and the Finnish National Opera directed by Noa Naamat and conducted by first Kapellmeister and deputy GMD Johannes Zahn.

== Repertoire (selection) ==
- Alfano: Dimitri Ivanovich in Risurrezione
- Auber: Masaniello in La Muette de Portici
- Berg: Tambourmajor in Wozzeck
- Carnahan: Charlie Silver in Requiem for Frankie Silver
- Donizetti: Edgardo in Lucia di Lammermoor
- Floyd: Sam Polk in Susannah
- Leoncavallo: Canio in Pagliacci
- Mascagni: Fritz Kobus in L'amico Fritz
- Mascagni: Turridu in Cavalleria Rusticana
- Montemezzi: Avito in L'amore dei tre re
- Offenbach: Hoffmann in Les contes d'Hoffmann
- Puccini: Luigi in Il tabarro
- Puccini: Rodolfo in La Bohème
- Puccini: B. F. Pinkerton in Madama Butterfly
- Puccini: Renato des Grieux in Manon Lescaut
- Puccini: Mario Cavaradossi in Tosca
- Rossini: Arnold in Guillaume Tell
- Strauss: Aeghist in Elektra
- Verdi: Radamès and Un Messagero in Aida
- Verdi: Foresto in Attila
- Verdi: Alfredo Germont in La traviata
- Verdi: Duca di Mantova in Rigoletto
- Wagner: Melot in Tristan und Isolde
- Zandonai: Romeo in Giulietta e Romeo

== Recordings ==
=== Video ===
- Alfano: Risurrezione. (Dynamic 2020.)

Anne Sophie Duprels as Katerina Mihaylovna (Katyusha), Matthew Vickers as Prinz Dimitri Ivanovitch Nehlyudov, Leon Kim as Simonson, Francesca Di Sauro as Sofia Ivanovna, Romina Tomasoni as Matryova Pavlovna/Anna, Nadia Pirazzini as Maidservant, Ana Victória Pitts as Vera/Korablyova, Barbara Marcacci as Fenyichka. Orchestra and choir of the Maggio Musicale Fiorentino. Conductor: Francesco Lanzillotta. Staging: Rosetta Cucchi. Video: Davide Mancini. Recorded on the 17th and 21st of January, 2020.

=== Audio ===
- Bizet: Carmen. (Euro Opera 3998, 2019.)

Irene Roberts (Carmen), Matthew Ryan Vickers (Don José), David Bizic (Escamillo), Valentina Mastrangelo (Micaëla), Gaetano Triscari (Zuniga), Stefano Marchiso (Moralès), Saverio Pugliese (Remendado), Tommaso Barea (Dancaïre). Conductor: Francesco Lanzillotta, Orchestra Filarmonica Marchigiana

- Auber: La Muette de Portici. (La Maison de la Lyrique, Auber 0024, 2025.)

Ricardo Garcia (Alfonso), Matthew Vickers (Masaniello), Megan Marie Hart (Elvire), Georg Festl (Pietro), Zaza Gagua (Borello), Marco Mondragón (Lorenzo), Johannes Seokhoon Moon (Selva), Kwanghee Choi (Ein Fischer). Opera choir of the Staatstheater Darmstadt, Staatsorchester Darmstadt conducted by Nicolas Kierdorf.

== Awards and recognition ==
- 2012: AIMS Meistersinger Competition – 3. prize and audience price
- 2013: Metropolitan Opera National Council Philadelphia District – Winner
- 2014: Metropolitan Opera National Council Washington D.C. Region – Encouragement award
- 2015: Annapolis Opera Vocal Competition – 3. prize
- 2015: Dock Mennonite Academy – Young Alum Award
- 2019: Giulio Gari Foundation International Vocal Competition – Grant winner
