= Perséphone (Stravinsky) =

Melodrama in three scenes by Igor Stravinsky

- Mélodrame by Igor Stravinsky
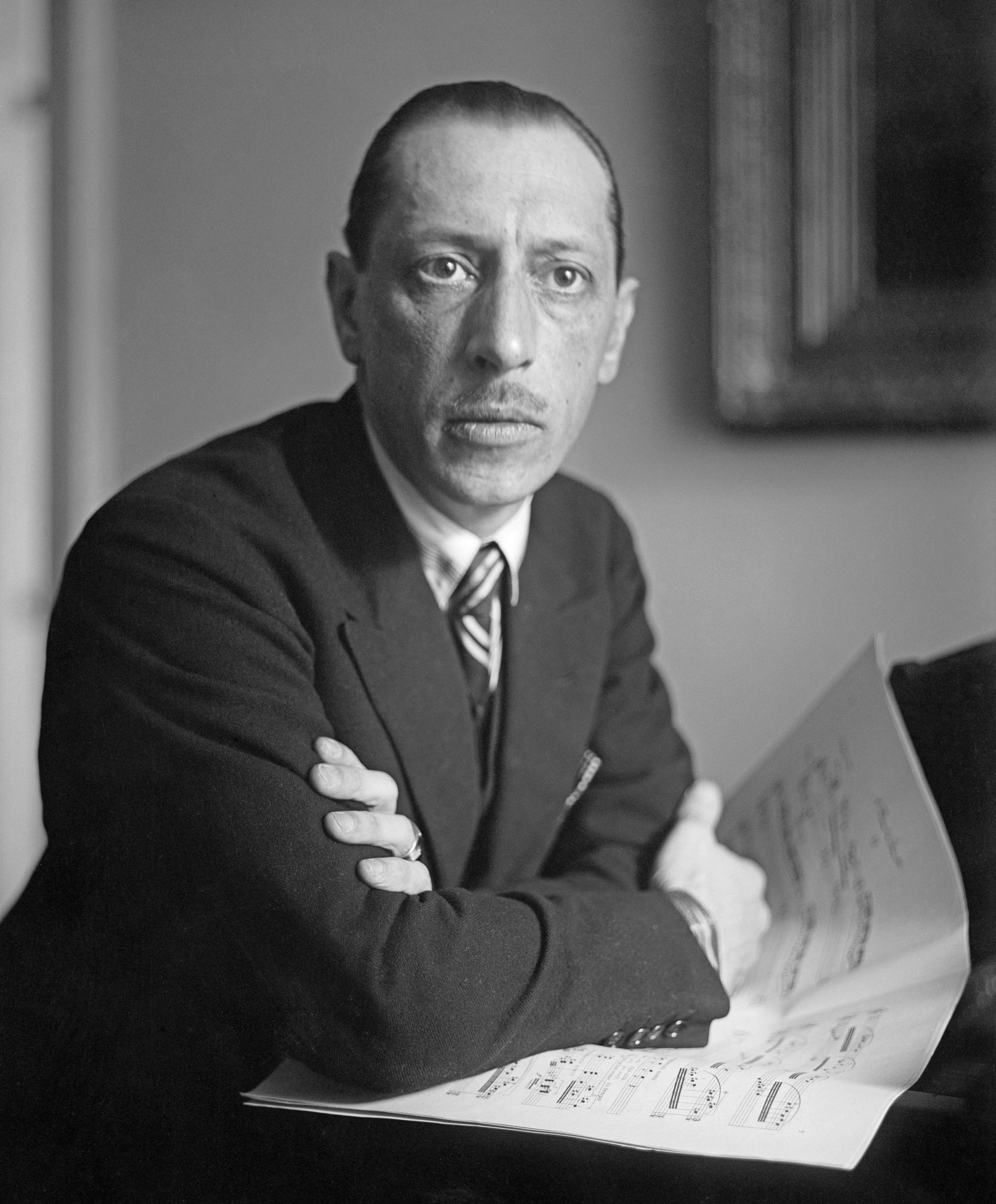
- The composer
- Librettist: André Gide
- Based on: Persephone myth
- Premiere: 30 April 1934; Opéra, Paris

Perséphone (Persephone) is a musical work (mélodrame) for speaker, solo singers, chorus, dancers and orchestra with music by Igor Stravinsky and a libretto by André Gide.

It was first performed under the direction of the composer at the Opéra in Paris, on 30 April 1934 in a double bill with the ballet Diane de Poitiers by Jacques Ibert. The premiere was staged by the ballet company of Ida Rubinstein, with Rubinstein herself dancing and speaking the part of Persephone and the tenor René Maison singing Eumolphe.

It was also performed at the Teatro Colón in Buenos Aires under Stravinsky himself in 1936 with Victoria Ocampo, an Argentinean preeminent writer and intellectual, and then in Rio de Janeiro. It was reprised at the Colón in 1995 with China Zorrilla under Pedro Ignacio Calderón.

Other choreographed versions have included those of George Balanchine, Kurt Jooss (1955), Frederick Ashton (1961), and Pina Bausch (1965). (Martha Graham's Persephone is accompanied by Stravinsky's Symphony in C.)

It was recorded by Stravinsky himself with Vera Zorina and also under André Cluytens (with Nicolai Gedda, 1955, Paris), Sir Andrew Davis (with Paul Groves, London), Michael Tilson Thomas (with Stuart Neill, 1999, San Francisco), and Esa-Pekka Salonen (with Andrew Staples, 2018, Finnish National Opera). A 2012 production at the Teatro Real, Madrid, directed by Peter Sellars with Teodor Currentzis conducting, was released on Blu-ray, paired with Tchaikovsky's Iolanta, Op.69, from the same 2012 production.

== Roles ==
- Eumolpe, tenor René Maison
- Perséphone, ballerina Ida Rubinstein
- Demetra-Dometer, ballerina Krakowska
- Mercure, dancer Anatole Viltzak
- Pluton, dancer
- Démophoon, dancer

== Synopsis ==
The melodrama tells the story of the Greek goddess Persephone, in three parts:

1. Perséphone ravie (The Abduction of Persephone);
2. Perséphone aux enfers (Persephone in the Underworld);
3. Perséphone renaissante (Rebirth of Persephone).
