= Aerobic methane production =

Potential biological pathway for atmospheric methane production

Methane

Aerobic methane production is a potential biological pathway for atmospheric methane (CH_{4}) production under oxygenated conditions. The existence of this pathway was first theorized in 2006. While significant evidence suggests the existence of this pathway, it remains poorly understood and its existence is controversial. Naturally occurring methane is mainly produced by the process of methanogenesis, a form of anaerobic respiration used by microorganisms as an energy source. Methanogenesis usually only occurs under anoxic conditions. By contrast, aerobic methane production is thought to occur in oxygenated environments under near-ambient conditions. The process involves non-microbial methane generation from terrestrial plant-matter. Temperature and ultraviolet light are thought to be key factors in this process. Methane may also be produced under aerobic conditions in near-surface ocean water, a process which likely involves the degradation of methylphosphonate.

== From terrestrial plants ==
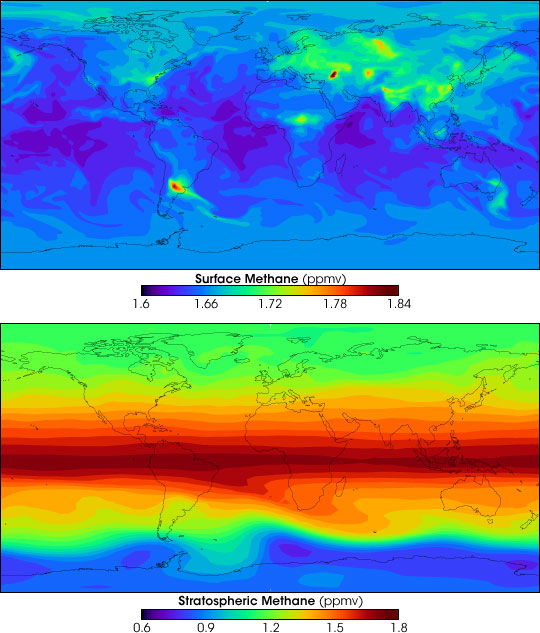
Global atmospheric methane distribution

=== Initial discovery ===
In 2005, Frankenberg et al. published the findings of a global methane distribution study in which they used space-borne near-infrared absorption spectroscopy. The study identified significantly elevated CH_{4} mixing ratios in tropical regions above evergreen forests. The data indicated an additional tropical source of 30–40 Tg over the time period of the investigation (August–November). This contribution could not be adequately explained within the currently accepted global budget of CH_{4}. These findings prompted Keppler et al. to conduct their study to investigate the possibility of methane formation by plant material. Their study included glass vial incubation experiments with detached leaves and Plexiglas chamber experiments with intact plants. In both cases the material was sealed in a controlled environment with CH_{4}-free air in order to analyze the production of CH_{4}. Since the tests were conducted under aerobic conditions it was unlikely that any CH_{4} produced would be related to methanogenic bacteria. This possibility was further excluded by measuring CH_{4} production by leaf tissue sterilized with γ-radiation. They theorized that "the structural component pectin plays a prominent role in the in situ formation of CH_{4} in plants" but were unable to identify a chemical mechanism for this CH_{4} production.

=== Further study ===
Wang et al. (2008) found that methane emissions varied greatly by plant species, noting that shrub species were much more likely to produce methane than herbaceous species. They also noted that among herbaceous species which they tested, those that emitted methane did so from stems, but not from detached leaves, while shrub species typically emitted higher methane concentrations from detached leaves. A follow-up study by Keppler et al. reconfirmed their earlier findings and found "unambiguous isotope evidence that methoxyl groups of pectin can act as a source of atmospheric CH_{4} under aerobic conditions", but again failed to identify the chemical mechanism.

=== Influence of temperature and light ===
Keppler et al.. observed that the release of CH_{4} was "very temperature sensitive—concentrations approximately doubled with every 10 °C increase over the range 30–70 °C suggesting a non-enzymic rather than an enzyme-mediated process". They also remarked that "emission rates were found to increase dramatically, by a factor of 3–5 (up to 870 ng per g (dry weight) h^{−1}), when chambers were exposed to natural sunlight". Vigano et al.. found that "emissions from UV irradiation are almost instantaneous, indicating a direct photochemical process".

=== Potential environmental significance ===
Keppler et al.. calculated a "first estimate" for the newly established CH_{4} source. Their calculations were based on broad assumptions, which they admitted neglected "the complexity of terrestrial ecosystems". They estimated methane released by living vegetation to be in the range 62–236 Tg yr^{−1} (average 149 Tg yr^{−1}) with the main contribution assigned to tropical forests and grasslands. They believed that "the detection of an additional source of this magnitude, some 10-30% of the present annual source strength, would necessitate reconsideration of the global CH_{4} budget". Later estimates, using Keppler et al.'s data as well as data produced by later studies suggested a lesser global significance. One study suggested that the maximum global emissions of methane from terrestrial plants might only be on the order of 0.2–1.0 Tg CH_{4} yr^{−1} compared with total global emissions of 550 Tg CH_{4} yr^{−1}, a significantly smaller contribution.

=== Criticism and conflicting data ===
Following the publication of Keppler et al.'s (2006) findings, there was a substantial response from the scientific community. Many questioned the findings, pointing to flaws in Keppler et al.'s methodology. In particular, their up-scaling method for calculating global estimates for methane emissions by terrestrial plants was criticized. A number of follow-up publications presented conflicting data, generating significant uncertainty in the role of terrestrial plants to the global methane budget.

Dueck et al. conducted similar experiments to the intact-plant chamber experiments conducted by Keppler et al.. They found "no evidence for substantial methane emissions from terrestrial plants". They suggested that the supposed emissions observed by Keppler et al. may have been related to "ambient methane concentrations in inter-cellular air spaces and air spaces in the soil system". Vigano et al. later responded to this criticism by suggesting that, if UV light is in fact an important factor in aerobic methane emissions, "then it is not surprising that no emissions were found by Dueck et al. (2007), who used metal halide HPI-T lamps and glass chambers for their measurements". Other studies suggested that the detected methane emissions were related to transport of dissolved methane from the soil in water, or to the spontaneous breakdown of plant matter under certain stress conditions.

== In aquatic environments ==
Supersaturation of methane in oxygenated, near-surface water in oceans, lakes and rivers is a phenomenon which has been widely observed, but which is still poorly understood. Methane is often 10–75% supersaturated in the oxygenated surface mixed layer of oceans, and up to 1000% in lakes causing aquatic environments to contribute methane to the atmosphere.

Several sources and mechanisms have been identified for the production of methane in aquatic environments. One such source is the degradation of dissolved water column methylphosphonate. The importance of the degradation of methylphosphonate in the production of CH4 in the ocean is likely variable and may be related to the availability of Fe, N, and P in the water column and to the presence and nature of the enzymatic machinery that processes the methylphosphonates.

A second source which appears not to depend on any substrate is the emission of methane by phytoplankton (algae and cyanobacteria) during the process of photosynthesis.

The presence of algae and cyanobacteria in all illuminated aquatic environments on Earth likely makes this process a significant contributor to aquatic methane emissions. In the last decades we have been witnessing an increase in cyanobacterial and algal blooms as a result of anthropogenic pollution and global warming.

Since Atmospheric methane is a very potent greenhouse gas, a feedback loop was hypothesized in which algae and cyanobacteria produced methane, enhance warming, and subsequently enhance blooms. Dimethylsulfoniopropionate (DMSP) is a common compound in marine environments used by algae as an osmoprotectant. Several studies have revealed that the degradation of DMSP by bacteria results in the release of methane.

Methylamines are a known source of methane from anoxic environments. In 2018, Bizic et al. published results showing that degradation of methylamines result in methane emissions also under oxic conditions. The mechanism responsible for this process was later identified by Wang et al. and was attributed to a single, very common gene.

Several other mechanisms have been since then recognized. In 2022, Perez-Coronel & Beman analyzed methane production in fresh water and found an association with "(bacterio)chlorophyll metabolism and photosynthesis, Keppler and colleagues identified a mechanism through which reactive oxygen species result in the production of methane by potentially organism utilizing oxygen.
