= Doctor Antonio (TV series) =

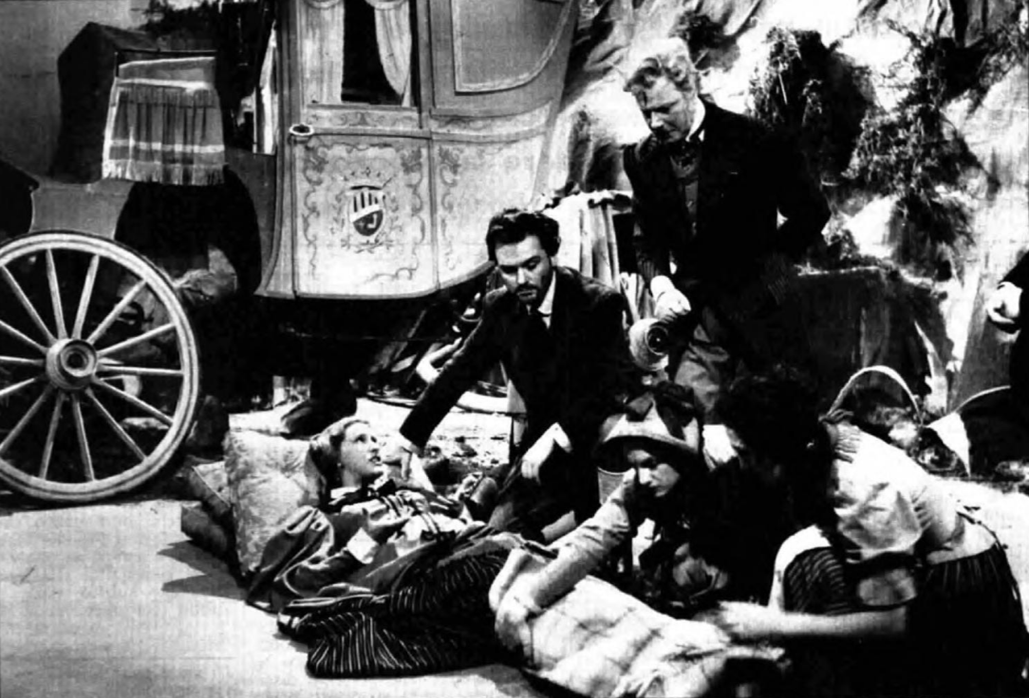
- Production still
- Genre: Historical
- Country of origin: Italy
- Original language: Italian
- No. of seasons: 1
- No. of episodes: 4 episodes

Production
- Production company: RAI

Original release
- Network: Programma Nazionale (later known as Rai Uno)
- Release: 16 November – 7 December 1954

Doctor Antonio (Italian:Il dottor Antonio) is a 1954 Italian television series, based on the 1855 novel of the same title by Giovanni Ruffini. It aired in four parts on RAI, the state broadcaster that had launched the same year. It was the first literary adaptation to be broadcast on Italian television.

== Synopsis ==
In the mid-nineteenth century, a patriot fighting for Italian unification meets and falls in love with an English aristocrat while in exile. Eventually he decides to leave her and return to fight and die for his country.

== Cast ==
- Luciano Alberici
- Edmonda Aldini
- Corrado Anicelli
- Miranda Campa
- Alberto Carloni
- Mario Colli
- Olinto Cristina
- Emma Danieli
- Enzo Donzelli
- Cristina Fanton
- Betty Foà
- Giacomo Furia
- Antonio Cifariello
- Mario Maldesi
- Grazia Marescalchi
- Ludovica Modugno
- Alighiero Noschese
- Corrado Pani
- Stefano Sibaldi
- Jolanda Verdirosi

== Bibliography ==
- Buonanno, Milly. Italian TV Drama and Beyond: Stories from the Soil, Stories from the Sea. Intellect Books, 2012.
