= David Bižić =

Serbian-born French operatic baritone (born 1975)

- Давид Бижић
- David Bižić
- Born: 25 November 1975 (age 50); Belgrade, Serbia
- Education: Jerusalem Academy of Music and Dance
- Occupation: Operatic baritone
- Years active: 2000–present
- Children: 2
- Relatives: Dr. Mina Bizic (sister)
- Awards: Second Prize from Operalia (2007); AROP Prix Lyriques (2005)
- Musical career
- Genres: Opera
- Instrument: Voice
- Major opera houses: Metropolitan Opera, Paris Opera, San Francisco Opera, Vienna State Opera

David Bižić (Serbian Cyrillic: Давид Бижић; born 25 November 1975 in Belgrade, Serbia) is a Serbian-born French operatic baritone.

== Early life ==
Bižić was born in Belgrade, Serbia. He studied archaeology before he pursued vocal arts. His father was a physical chemist and his mother is a psychologist.

His love for opera, he states, started at early age being exposed to opera records at home, especially The Three Tenors concerts. Two of the four main artists from those recordings, Zubin Mehta and by Placido Domingo conducted him later in the career.

I remember feeling really connected to Domingo, Pavarotti, the famous tenors. I was seven or eight years old when I listened to them sing arias, and although I didn't know what they were singing about, I could feel the emotion and passion, and that spoke so much to me. I also did conducting at home and became passionate about expressing myself through music. But I had no idea that I would become an opera singer. It was never on my list of possible professions."

== Education and early career ==
In 2000 at the age of 24 he started studying voice at the Jerusalem Academy of Music and Dance with Bibiana Goldenthal. He later continued his education with International Vocal Arts Institute (IVAI) and apprenticed with the Israeli Opera YAP and Paris National Opera – Atelier Lyrique program.

He has participated in numerous master classes and concerts in France, Israel, New York and Japan working with José van Dam, Teresa Berganza and Gabriel Bacquier among others.

== Singing career ==
After his musical training in Tel Aviv, Paris and New York, Bizic's principal role debut was in the title role of Mozart's Le Nozze di Figaro in Nantes, in 2006. During that same time, he was awarded the AROP Prix lyrique by the Paris National Opera, and has won the second prize of Operalia world opera competition.

Bižić has since appeared in major opera houses and festivals across Europe and America.

Bižić's career first garnered international attention in the role of Masetto in two critically acclaimed productions of Don Giovanni by Michael Haneke at the Paris Opera and Dmitri Tcherniakov in Aix-en-Provence Festival. He later revived both of those productions, now in the role of Leporello.

In 2014 Bižić made his debut at the Metropolitan Opera in New York singing Albert in Richard Eyre's production of Werther alongside Jonas Kaufmann and Sophie Koch and came back the following season to sing Marcello (La bohème). He has been back to the Metropolitan Opera every season after that having sung more than 60 shows so far.

=== Opera ===
As an interpreter of Mozart roles—most notably Don Giovanni, Leporello, and Masetto in Don Giovanni, Almaviva and Figaro in The Marriage of Figaro, and Guglielmo and Don Alfonso in Così fan tutte—Bižić has performed at the Paris Opera, Wiener Staatsoper, Los Angeles Opera, Teatro Real, Bolshoi Theatre, Bordeaux, Monte Carlo, Geneve, Ravinia Festival, Valencia, Toulouse, Deutsche Oper Berlin, Maribor, Vlaamse Opera, Montpellier, Rennes, Saint Etienne, Rouen, Aix en Provence, Dijon, Nantes and Strasbourg.

Other career highlights include his Metropolitan Opera debut as Albert in Werther, Albert and Schaunard in the Royal Opera House, London, his debut at the Teatro Liceo as Manon's brother in Puccini's Manon Lescaut, Marcello and Sharpless in the Metropolitan Opera, title role of Eugene Onegin in Limoges, Metz and Tel Aviv, Lucia di Lammermoor's Enrico in Toulon Opera, Zurga in Bizet's Les pêcheurs de perles in Bordeaux and Dortmund, Escamillo (Carmen) in Tel Aviv, Belgrade, Stockholm, Dijon and Macerata Opera, High Priest of Dagon (Samson et Dalila) at the Royal Swedish Opera and the title role of Don Pasquale in Toulon.

In 2023, Bižić debuted at the San Francisco Opera portraying Belcore in Daniel Slater's production of Donizetti's L'elisir d'amore, conducted by Ramón Tebar.

=== Concerts ===
In opera concert performances Bizic has sung Sharples in Puccini's Madama Butterfly with the Hallé Orchestra conducted by Sir Mark Elder.

He has also performed Leporello in Mozart's Don Giovanni in Ravinia Festival with Chicago Symphony Orchestra conducted by James Conlon, La Vida Breve with the Orchestre de Paris conducted by Rafael Frühbeck de Burgos, and Zurga from Bizet's Les pêcheurs de perles with WDR Rundfunkorchester Köln conducted by Friedrich Haider. He has additionally sung the role of Christ in César Franck’s Les Béatitudes with the Orchestre Philharmonique Royal de Liège under the direction of Gergely Madaras.

His other concert appearances include Beethoven's 9th Symphony with the Orchestre de Montpellier and the Orchestre de Bordeaux conducted by Marc Minkowski, Zeisl's Requiem Ebraico with the Israel Philharmonic Orchestra conducted by Zubin Mehta, Fauré's Requiem with the Ensemble Orchestral de Paris and Accentus Choir for the Saint Denis Festival conducted by Laurence Equilbey and Brahms' A German Requiem with the Serbian Radio TV Symphony Orchestra.

David Bižić has collaborated with a wide range of conductors, including Yannick Nézet-Séguin, James Conlon, Antonio Pappano, Marc Minkowski, Zubin Mehta, Friedrich Haider, Sir Mark Elder, Louis Langrée, Alain Altinoglu, Gianandrea Noseda, Emmanuel Villaume, Daniele Rustioni,, and Marco Armiliato.

== Personal life ==
Bižić lives in Bordeaux, France. He is married and has two children. Bižić can also play piano and didjeridoo. He is a brother of Dr. Mina Bizic

== Awards ==
Bižić is a winner of the second prize from Operalia in 2007 and Paris Opera AROP Prix Lyriques in 2005.

== Recordings ==
La bohème – Puccini (Marcello)

- Sergio Alapont, Irish National Opera
- Signum Classics SKU: SIGCD702 – CD
- Released 2022

Requiem Ebraico – Zeisl

- Zubin Mehta, Israel Philharmonic Orchestra
- Helicon Classics 02-9625 – CD
- Released 2006

L'Amour des trois oranges – Prokofiev

- Sylvain Cambreling, Paris National Opera
- TDK – DVD
- Released 2006

Don Giovanni – Mozart (Leporello)

- Antony Hermus, Rennes Opera
- Culturebox streaming
- Released 2010

La bohème – Puccini (Schaunard)

- Sir Mark Elder, Royal Opera House
- ROH Live Cinema Season
- Released 2012

Les Béatitudes – Franck (Christ)

- Gergely Madaras, Orchestre Philharmonique de Liège
- Fuga Libera SKU: FUG817 – CD
- Released 2024

Werther – Massenet (Albert)

- Alain Altinoglu, Metropolitan Opera
- Met Opera on Demand
- Released 2014

Don Giovanni – Mozart (Masetto)

- Louis Langrée, Festival d'Aix-en-Provence
- BelAir Classiques – BAC611, BAC480 – DVD, BLU-RAY
- Released 2013

Werther – Massenet (Albert)

- Antonio Pappano, Royal Opera House
- ROH Live Cinema Season
- Released 2016

Manon Lescaut – Puccini (Lescaut)

- Emmanuel Villaume, Gran Teatre del Liceu
- Mezzo TV, Naxos
- Released 2018

Hipishizik Metafizik – Rambo Amadeus

- PGP RTS – 416934 CD
- Released 2008

Carmen – Bizet (Escamillo)

- Francesco Lanzillotta, Orchestra Filarmonica Marchigiana
- Euro Opera – Euro Opera 3998
- Recorded 2019, with Irene Roberts (Carmen), Matthew Ryan Vickers (Don José).

Les pêcheurs de perles – Bizet (Zurga)

- Friedrich Haider, WDR Funkhausorchester
- Euro Opera – Euro Opera 3784
- Recorded 2019
