= Doctor Antonio (1937 film) =

1937 film

- Directed by: Enrico Guazzoni
- Written by: Giovanni Ruffini (novel); Gherardo Gherardi; Enrico Guazzoni; Gino Talamo
- Starring: Ennio Cerlesi; Maria Gambarelli; Lamberto Picasso; Tina Zucchi
- Cinematography: Massimo Terzano
- Edited by: Gino Talamo
- Music by: Umberto Mancini; Giovanni Fusco
- Production company: Manderfilm
- Distributed by: Manderfilm
- Release date: 12 December 1937
- Running time: 103 minutes
- Country: Italy
- Language: Italian

Doctor Antonio (Italian: Il dottor Antonio) is a 1937 Italian historical drama film directed by Enrico Guazzoni and starring Ennio Cerlesi, Maria Gambarelli, and Lamberto Picasso. The film is an adaptation of the 1855 novel of the same title by Giovanni Ruffini set during the Risorgimento. It was shot at the Cinecittà Studios in Rome with location shooting on the island of Ischia off Naples. The film's sets were designed by the art director Gherardo Gherardi.

The story takes place during the reign of Ferdinand II. A revolutionary leader falls in love with the daughter of an Englishman.

== Cast ==
- Ennio Cerlesi as Il dottor Antonio
- Maria Gambarelli as Miss Lucy
- Lamberto Picasso as Sir John Davenne
- Tina Zucchi as Speranza
- Vinicio Sofia as Turi
- Mino Doro as Prospero
- Margherita Bagni as Miss Elizabeth
- Claudio Ermelli as Tom
- Luigi Pavese as Aubrey
- Giannina Chiantoni as Rosa
- Romolo Costa as Hasting
- Augusto Di Giovanni as Ferdinando II di Napoli
- Guido Celano as Domenico Morelli
- Enzo Biliotti as Carlo Poerio
- Alfredo Menichelli as Luigi Settembrini
- Massimo Pianforini as Lord Cleverton
- Rocco D'Assunta as Michele Pironti
- Vittorio Bianchi as Il dottore Stage
- Alfredo Robert as Il generale Nunziante
- Enzo De Felice as Romeo
- Olinto Cristina as Ambasciatore inglese
- Giuseppe Duse as Ufficiale borbonico
- Achille Majeroni as L'avvocato dell'accusa
- Giovanni Onorato as Un oratore in piazza
- Aristide Garbini as Conspiratore
- Pietro Tordi as L'altro conspiratore
- Luigi Esposito
- Cesare Fantoni
- Giovanni Ferraguti
- Giovanni Ferrari
- Alessio Gobbi
- Gilberto Macellari
- Michele Malaspina
- Ermena Malusardi
- Ornella Da Vasto
- Alessandra Varna

== Bibliography ==
- Goble, Alan. The Complete Index to Literary Sources in Film. Walter de Gruyter, 1999.
