= Mina Bizic =

Environmental microbiologist with particular interest in aquatic systems

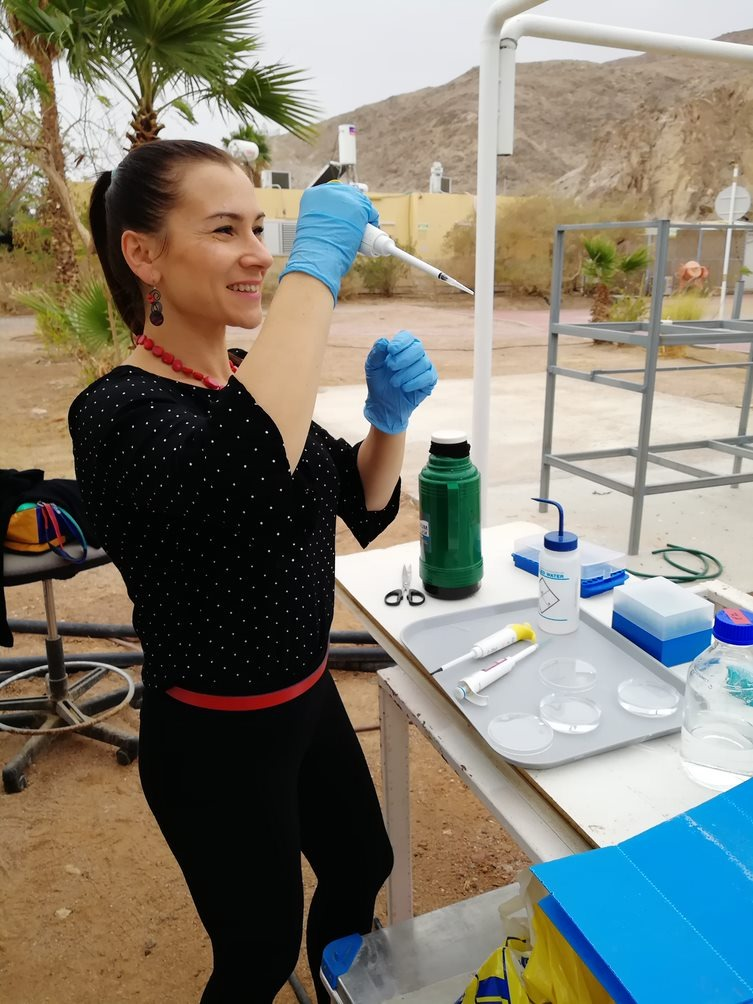
- Born: Belgrade, Serbia
- Education: University of Belgrade (B.Sc.); Max Planck Institute for Marine Microbiology (PhD); University of Oldenburg
- Spouse: Danny Ionescu
- Children: 2
- Scientific career
- Fields: Microbiology, Environmental science
- Workplaces: Technische Universität Berlin; Kinneret Limnological Laboratory; Leibniz Institute of Freshwater Ecology and Inland Fisheries
- Thesis: Polyphasic comparison of limnic and marine particle-associated bacteria (2014)

Mina Bizic is an environmental microbiologist with particular interest in aquatic systems. She is mostly known for her work on organic matter particles and oxic methane production. Since July 2024, she is a Full Professor at the Technische Universität Berlin and Chair of Environmental Microbiomics at the Institute of Environmental Technology. She was named a fellow of the Association for the Sciences of Limnology and Oceanography (ASLO) in 2022, and is serving on the ASLO board of directors where she is chairing the Early Career Committee.

== Education and career ==
Bizic completed her Diploma studies in General Biology, and Hydroecology and Water Protection at the University of Belgrade from 1999 to 2005. Following her diploma, in 2005–2006, she engaged in transdisciplinary academic research in Ancient Jewish texts studies at the European Institute for Jewish Studies in Sweden (PAIDEIA). She later moved to Israel, where she worked for three years at the Kinneret Limnological Laboratory (KLL) of the Israel Oceanographic and Limnological Research (IOLR).

Subsequently, Bizic earned her Ph.D. from the Max Planck Institute for Marine Microbiology in Bremen and the University of Oldenburg as part of The International Max Planck Research School of Marine Microbiology (MarMic) Her doctoral thesis was titled "Polyphasic comparison of limnic and marine particle-associated bacteria". Following her Ph.D., she conducted a postdoc at the Leibniz Institute of Freshwater Ecology and Inland Fisheries (IGB). In 2019, Bizic obtained a DFG German Research Foundation independent researcher grant.

== Research ==
During her investigations into marine and lake snow, Bizic and her collaborators developed a novel experimental device, a flow-through rolling tank, which facilitates long-term experiments on marine and lake snow while addressing biases inherent in closed systems, commonly referred to as the bottle effect. Using this device, Bizic demonstrated that microbial degradation of marine snow takes longer than predicted using closed experimental systems. This finding implies that the biological carbon pump may sequester more carbon than experimentally estimated.

In a subsequent study, Bizic and her colleagues conducted the first research utilizing molecular tools to focus on individual marine and lake snow particles rather than pooling thousands together. This groundbreaking study revealed that particles from the same source are colonized by different bacteria, in what appears to be a stochastic colonization process. Furthermore, the study highlighted that, at the early stages of colonization, bacterial succession is primarily driven by competition rather than a change in the quality of available organic matter.

In parallel with her work on marine and lake snow, Bizic has delved into aerobic methane production, a phenomenon known as "The Methane Paradox". This process is increasingly recognized as a significant source of the potent greenhouse gas methane in aquatic systems. Bizic and her colleagues were the first to demonstrate the conversion of methylamines to methane under aerobic conditions. This process was later comprehensively characterized by Wang and colleagues. Subsequently, Bizic and her team revealed that cyanobacteria, the most abundant photosynthetic organisms on Earth, emit methane as a byproduct of photosynthesis. The implications of this discovery were explored by Bizic in a subsequent opinion paper.

== Recognition and activities ==
In 2022, Bizic was elected to the Board of Directors of the Association for the Sciences of Limnology and Oceanography (ASLO). She currently serves as a member at large and chairs the Early Career committee of ASLO, organizing activities for the benefit of early career scientists such as the promotion of early career scientist from historically excluded groups as well as organizing webinars to improve the mental well-being of scientists. Bizic's contributions to aquatic research and to ASLO were further acknowledged when she was named an ASLO fellow in 2022. In 2026, she delivered a keynote lecture at the Methanocean international conference on recent developments in oxic methane production.

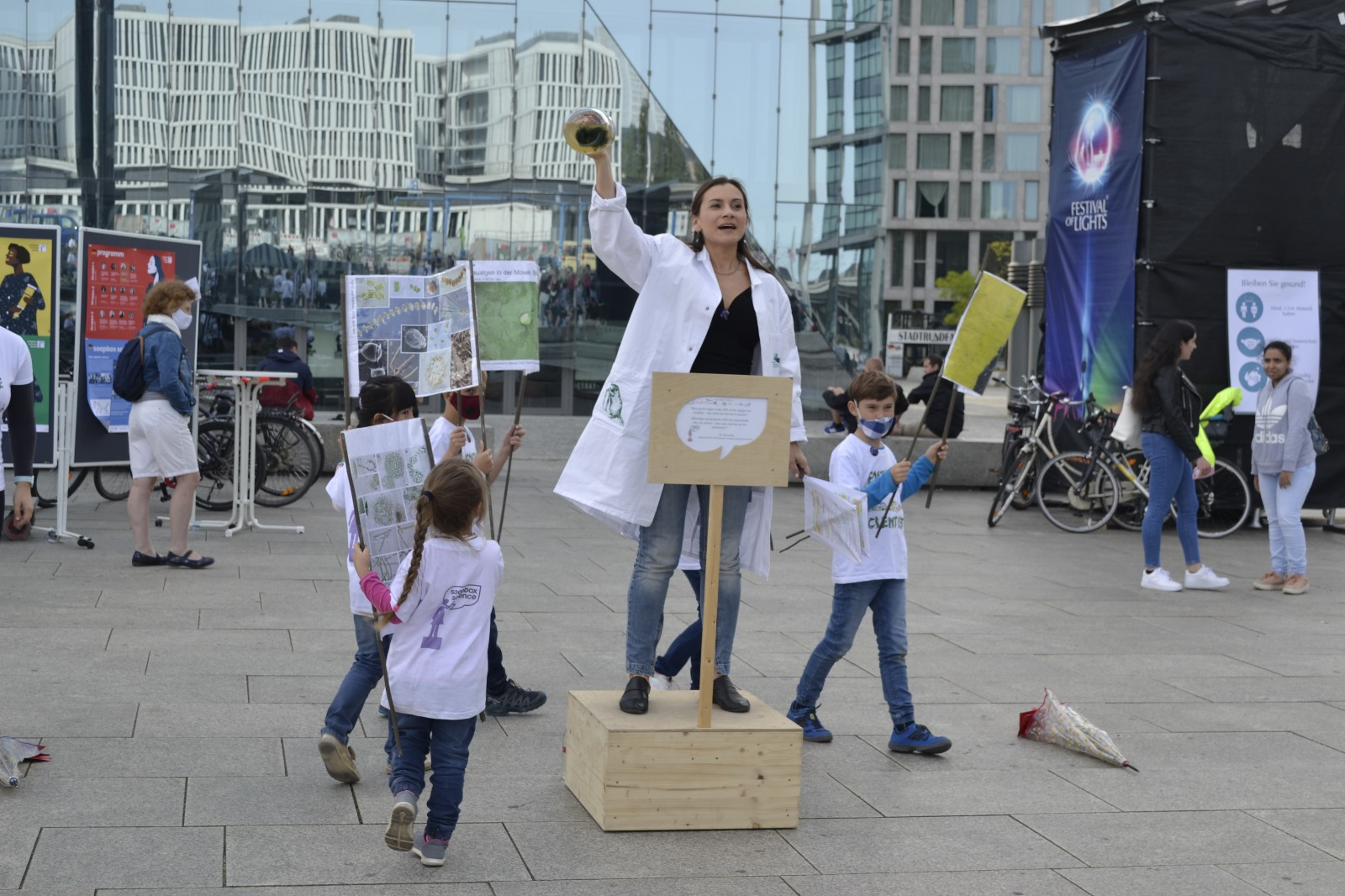
Dr Mina Bizic at Soapbox Science in Berlin 2020

Beyond her academic endeavors, Bizic is involved in the Global Lake Ecological Observatory Network (GLEON), and as of 2024, serves as a member in their committee for inclusive collaboration. In 2026, Bizic was elected as one of the spokespersons for the alumni network of the Leibniz Mentoring Programme, representing former participants of the Leibniz Association's career development programme for women scientists. Bizic has participated in interviews, events and panel discussions addressing the role of women in science such as the Marthe Vogt podcast and the Soapbox Science.

== Personal life ==
Mina Bizic was born in Belgrade, Serbia, and has lived in Sweden and Israel. In 2009, she relocated to Germany. She is the sibling of opera singer David Bizic and is married to fellow scientist Danny Ionescu, with whom she has two children.
