= Maria Gambarelli =

Italian-American ballerina and actress (1900–1990)

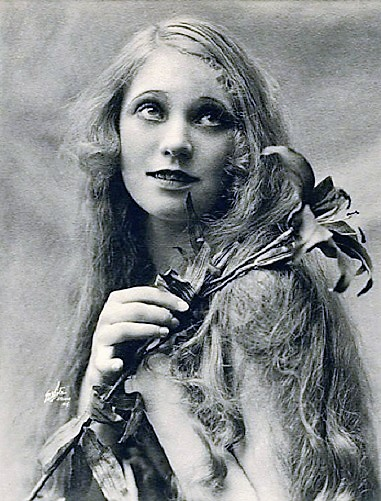
- Gambarelli in the 1930s
- Born: 7 April 1900; La Spezia, Liguria, Italy
- Died: 4 February 1990 (aged 89); Huntington, New York, U.S.
- Other name: Gamby
- Occupations: Dancer; actress
- Years active: 1908–1968
- Spouse: Edward Fenton (m. 1935)

Maria Gambarelli (7 April 1900 – 4 February 1990) was an Italian-American ballerina and actress. She was born in La Spezia, but raised in the United States. Between 1938 and 1941 she was prima ballerina at the Metropolitan Opera. She was considered to be the greatest dancer trained at the Metropolitan Opera ballet school.

== Selected filmography ==
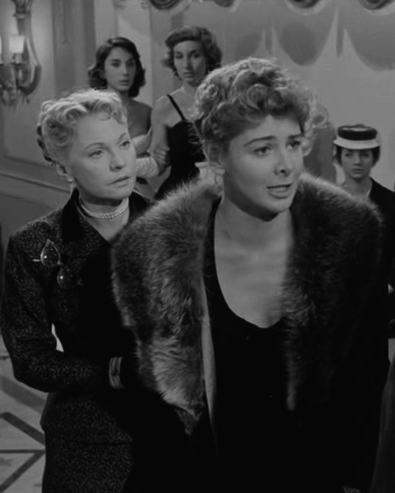
Gambarelli (left) in the 1955 film Le Amiche

- La Fiesta de Santa Barbara (1935)
- Here's to Romance (1935)
- Hooray for Love (1935)
- Doctor Antonio (1937)
- Le Amiche (1955)
- The Prince with the Red Mask (1955)

== Bibliography ==
- Salvatore J. LaGumina, Frank J. Cavaioli, Salvatore Primeggia & Joseph A. Varacalli. The Italian American Experience: An Encyclopedia. Routledge, 2003.
