= Franco Alfano =

Italian composer & pianist (1875–1954)

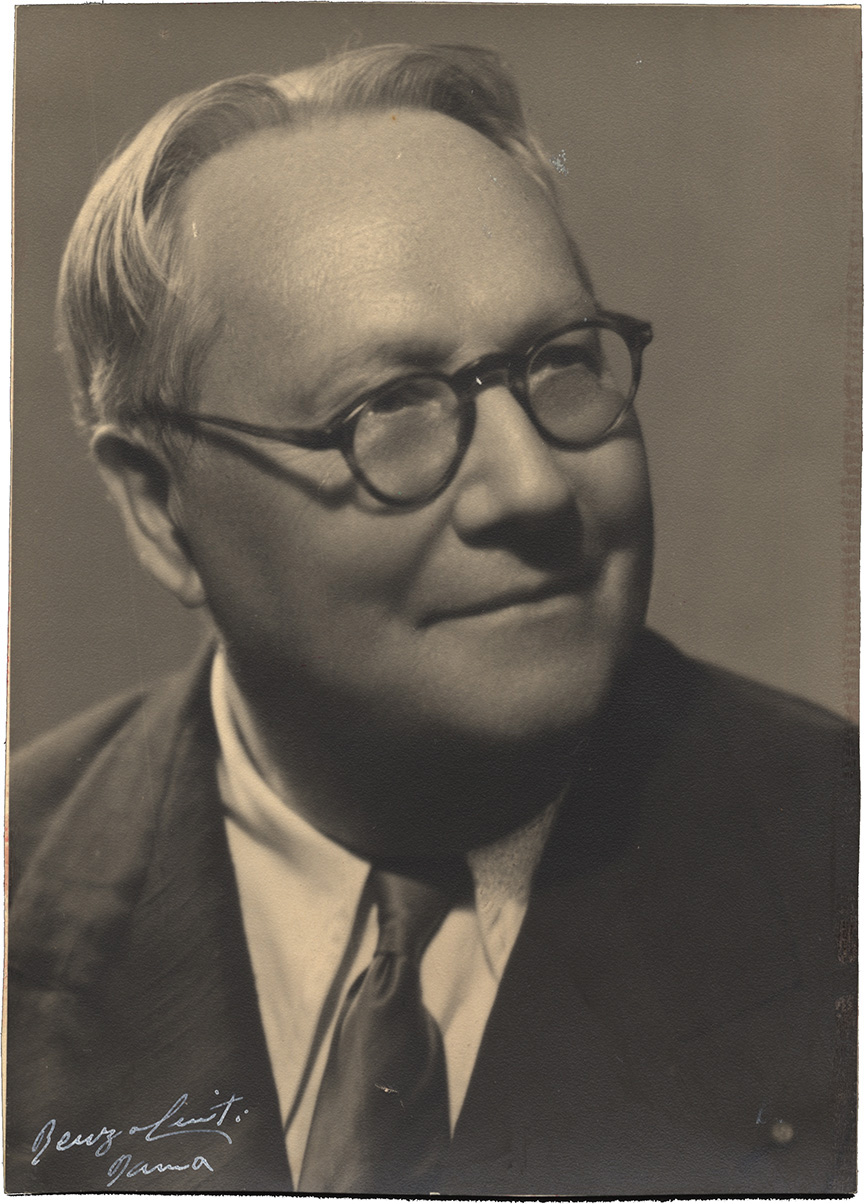
- Born: 8 March 1875; Posillipo, Campania, Kingdom of Italy
- Died: 27 October 1954 (aged 79); Sanremo, Liguria, Italy
- Occupations: Composer; pianist

Franco Alfano (8 March 1875 – 27 October 1954) was an Italian composer and pianist, best known today for his operas Risurrezione (1904), Sakùntala (1921), and Cyrano de Bergerac (1936), and for having completed Puccini's opera Turandot in 1926. He had considerable success with several of his own works during his lifetime.

== Early life and training ==
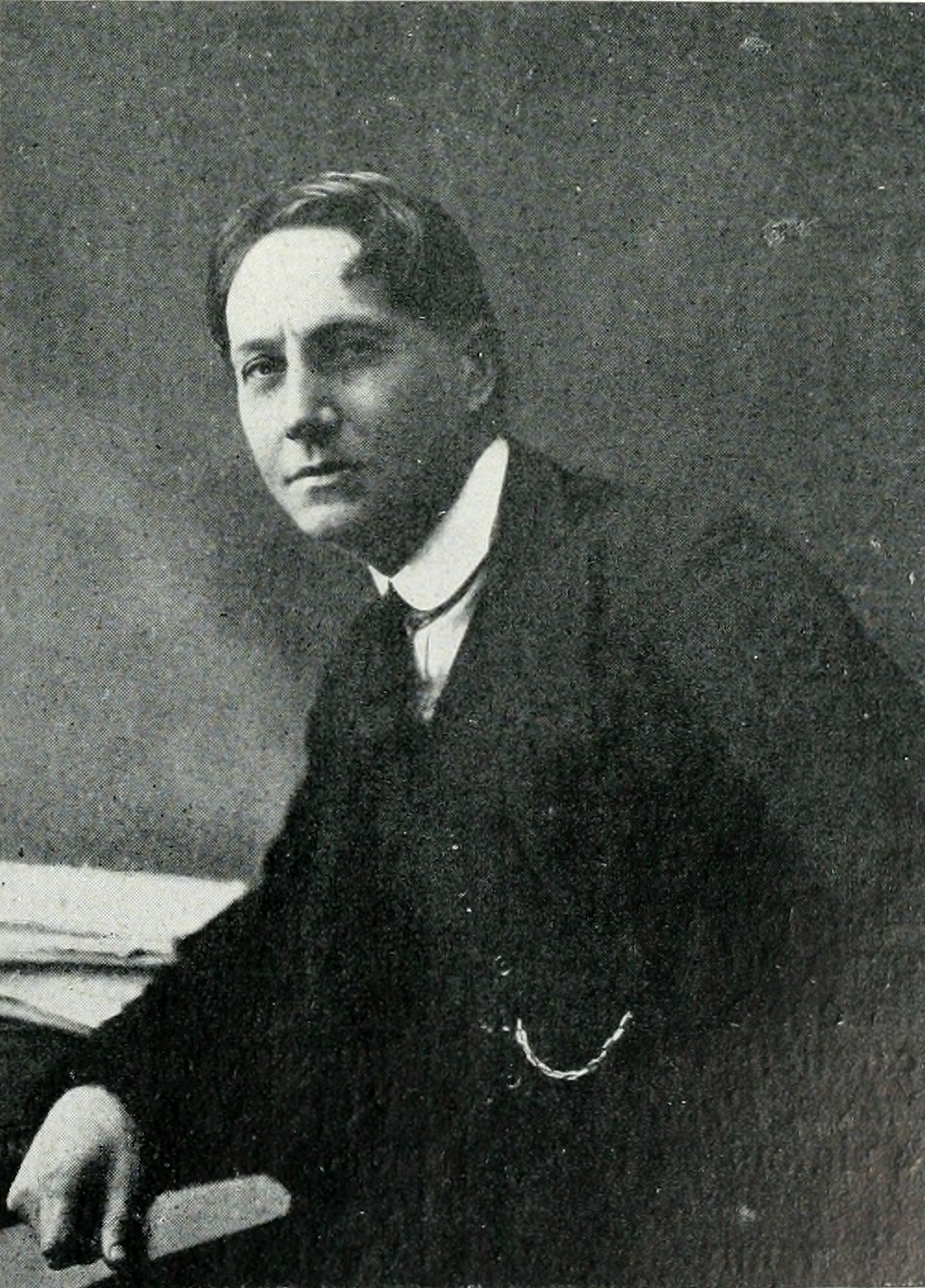
Franco Alfano, circa 1919

He was born Francesco Alfano on 8 March 1875 at 8:15 a.m. in Posillipo, Naples, to French-born Francesca "Fanny" née Fourcade (during World War I italianized to Fourcati) and Vincenzo Alfano, a highly regarded silver engraver, whose firm, Vincenzo Alfano & Figli, was appointed to the Italian royal family. Francesco was the first of six sons and there was also one daughter. They lived in what became the cosmopolitan and upscale Piazza San Luigi, a neighbourhood with homes belonging to several musicians, authors, and painters.

Later in life, Franco Alfano recalled singing in the duet "Mira, o Norma" from Bellini's opera Norma at the age of three. Not long after, a paternal aunt moved in, bringing her grand piano, and he began learning to play. A formal music instructor was soon engaged.

Beginning in the summer of 1886 he attended piano lessons given privately by Alessandro Longo and studied harmony and composition respectively under Camillo de Nardis (1857–1951) and Paolo Serrao at the Conservatory San Pietro a Majella in Naples, which he entered as an external student on 1 December 1891 and where he remained three years. In 1895 he pursued further composition studies with Hans Sitt and Salomon Jadassohn in Leipzig.

== Career ==
While working in Leipzig, he met his idol, Edvard Grieg, and wrote numerous piano and orchestral pieces. From 1899 to about 1905 he lived in Paris, where he composed ballet music, but also travelled in northern Europe, including to Russia.

From 1918 he was Director of the Conservatory of Bologna, from 1923 Director of the Turin Conservatory, and from 1947 to 1950 Director of the Rossini Conservatory in Pesaro. Alfano died in Sanremo.

=== Operas ===
Alfano completed his first opera, Miranda (unpublished), for which he also wrote the libretto based on a novel by Antonio Fogazzaro, in 1896. His work La Fonte di Enschir (libretto by Luigi Illica) was refused by Ricordi but was presented in Wrocław (then Breslau) as Die Quelle von Enschir on 8 November 1898. It enjoyed some success.

There followed the opera Risurrezione in 1904. It was based on Tolstoy, and the lead soprano role of Katerina Mihaylovna was later sung by Magda Olivero.

Cyrano de Bergerac followed. This based on the famous play by Edmond Rostand and composed to the French libretto by Henri Cain. It had its Italian premiere in Rome in January 1936 and its French premiere in Paris four months later. It was recently revived by the Kiel Opera (Germany), the Montpellier Radio Festival (France) and the Metropolitan Opera, New York City, starring Plácido Domingo in the title role.

In 1921, La Leggenda di Sakùntala appeared, described by some as his most important stage work, and while it was successful enough to have Arturo Toscanini recommend Alfano for the completion of Puccini's posthumous Turandot, the performance materials were thought destroyed in an air raid during the Second World War. Alfano reconstructed it in 1952 as Sakùntala, after Abhijñānaśākuntalam (The Recognition of Sakuntala), the Sanskrit play by Kālidāsa. Subsequently, the original version was recovered in 2005, with the two versions available for performance today. The second version of Sakùntala was performed in New York City by Teatro Grattacielo in the fall of 2013.

== Historical perspectives ==
In Fanfare's issue of September/October 2005, Henry Fogel argues that Alfano's completion of Puccini's Turandot has been unfairly criticised because the version that is usually performed is a heavily edited version of what he actually wrote, and this has caused "his entire reputation to sink". Furthermore, "Alfano's reputation has also suffered, understandably, because of his willingness to associate himself closely with Mussolini's Fascist government."

Andreas K. W. Meyer, in an essay in the booklet accompanying the first released complete recording of Alfano's opera Cyrano de Bergerac on the cpo label (2002), writes: […] it is not his [Alfano's] conclusion that is performed in productions of Turandot but only what the premiere conductor Arturo Toscanini included from it […] Puccini had worked for nine months on the following concluding duet and at his death had left behind a whole ream of sketches […] Alfano had to reconstruct […] according to his best assessment […] and with his imagination and magnifying glass" since Puccini's intentions "had not really been rendered legible."

== List of works ==
- 1896 Miranda, opera
- 1898 La Fonte di Enschir, opera
- 1899 Four Romanian Dances for piano
- 1901 Napoli, ballet
- 1901 Lorenza, ballet
- 1904 Risurrezione, opera
- 1909 Suite Romantica for orchestra (became Eliana)
- 1909 Il principe di Zilah, opera
- 1910 Symphony No. 1 in E major, Classica
- 1910 I Cavalieri e la Bella, opera (never completed)
- 1914 L'ombra di Don Giovanni, opera (later Don Juan de Manara)
- 1918 Tre poemi by Tagore, for voice and piano
- 1918 String Quartet No. 1
- 1919 Six songs for voice and piano
- 1919 Tre Poemi di Tagore for voice and piano
- 1921 La Leggenda di Sakùntala, opera
- 1923 Eliana, ballet from Suite Romantica
- 1923 Violin Sonata in D
- 1925 Cello Sonata
- 1926 Turandot, completion of Puccini's opera
- 1926 String Quartet No. 2
- 1927 Madonna Imperia, opera
- 1928 Tre Liriche di Tagore for voice and piano
- 1929 Three Lyrical Poems of Tagore for voice and piano
- 1930 L'ultimo Lord, opera semiseria, libretto by Ugo Falena
- 1930 Himno al Libertador, dedicated to Simón Bolívar
- 1932 Concerto for Violin, Cello and Piano
- 1933 Vesuvio, ballet
- 1933 Symphony No. 2 in C major
- 1935 Divertimento for piano and chamber orchestra
- 1936 Nuove Liriche Tagoriane for voice and piano
- 1936 Cyrano de Bergerac, opera
- 1939 Tre Nuove Liriche
- 1941 Don Juan de Manara, opera
- 1943 E' Giunto il Nostro Ultimo Autunno for voice and piano
- 1945 Piano Quintet in A-flat Major
- 1947 Sette Liriche for voice and piano
- 1948 Cinque Nuove Liriche Tagoriane for voice and piano
- 1949 Il Dottor Antonio, opera
- 1949 String Quartet No. 3 in G minor
- 1950 Vesuvius, opera for radio (from Vesuvius)
- 1952 Sakùntala, opera (reconstruction now superseded by the original 1921 score, discovered in 2006 in the Ricordi archives)
- 1953 Sinfonia Classica from Symphony No. 1
- Other works:
  - Suite Adriatica
  - Intermezzi for Strings
  - Ninna-Nanna Partenopea.

See also List of operas by Franco Alfano.

== Recordings ==
Operas

- Cyrano de Bergerac: Plácido Domingo, Sondra Radvanovsky, Arturo Chacón-Cruz, Rodney Gilfry; Orquestra de la Comunitat Valenciana; conductor Patrick Fournillier; Filmed at the Palau de les Ars 'Reina Sofia', Valencia, 8,11 & 18 February 2007; Naxos blu-ray and DVD; EAN 0747313527052;
- Cyrano de Bergerac: William Johns, Olivia Stapp, Gianfranco Cecchele, Miti Truccato Pace, Ezio Di Cesare, Alfredo Giacomotti - Director: Maurizio Arena - Orchestra RAI di Torino - Live - 2 CD Opera d'Oro IOD (2004);
- Risurrezione; Magda Olivero, Giuseppe Gismondo, Nucci Condò, Anna Di Stasio - Director: Elio Boncompagni - Live - 2 CD Opera d'Oro IOD (2003);
- Risurrezione; Anne Sophie Duprels, Matthew Vickers, Leon Kim, Francesca Di Sauro, Romina Tomasoni, Nadia Pirazzini, Ana Victória Pitts, Barbara Marcacci. Orchestra and choir of the Maggio Musicale Fiorentino. Conductor: Francesco Lanzillotta. Staging: Rosetta Cucchi. Video: Davide Mancini. DVD, Dynamic (2020);
- Sakùntala; Sakùntala: Celestina Casapietra – Il re: Michele Molese – Prijamvada: Laura Didier Gambardella – Anusuya: Adriana Baldiseri – Kanva: Aurio Tomicich – Durvasas: Ferruccio Mazzoli – Harita: Mario Rinaudo – Il giovane eremita: Ezio Di Cesare – Lo scudiero: Carlo Micheluzzi – Un pescatore: Vincenzo Tadeo – Una guardia: Alberto Caruzzi; Orchestra Sinfonica e Coro di Roma della Rai, director: Ottavio Ziino CD Tryphon TRC-9612;
- Liriche da Tagore; Duo Alterno: Tiziana Scandaletti, soprano - Riccardo Piacentini, piano, CD Nuova Era 7388 (Torino 2004).

Other compositions

- Sonata for Cello and Piano, 1925: Samuel Magill (cello); Scott Dunn (piano). CD: Naxos, 2009 (World premiere recording)
- Concerto for Violin, Cello and Piano, 1932: Elmira Darvarova (violin); Samuel Magill (cello); Scott Dunn piano. CD: Naxos, 2009 (World premiere recording)
- Sonata for Violin and Piano, 1923: Elmira Darvarova (violin); Scott Dunn (piano). CD: Naxos, 2011 (World premiere recording)
- Piano Quintet, 1945: Elmira Darvarova (violin); Mary Ann Mumm (violin); Craig Mumm (viola); Samuel Magill (cello); Scott Dunn (piano). CD, Naxos, 2011 (World premiere recording)
- String Quartet No. 1, 1918: Elmira Darvarova (violin); Mary Ann Mumm (violin); Craig Mumm (viola); Samuel Magill (cello). CD, Naxos, 2023 (World premiere recording)
- String Quartet No. 2, 1926: Elmira Darvarova (violin); Mary Ann Mumm (violin); Craig Mumm (viola); Samuel Magill (cello). CD, Naxos, 2023 (World premiere recording)
- String quartet No. 3, 1949: Elmira Darvarova (violin); Mary Ann Mumm (violin); Craig Mumm (viola); Samuel Magill (cello). CD, Naxos, 2023 (World premiere recording)
