= Irene Roberts (physician-scientist) =

British paediatric haematology researcher

Irene Roberts is a British physician-scientist specializing in pediatric hematology. She is an emeritus professor of paediatric haematology at the MRC Weatherall Institute of Molecular Medicine at the University of Oxford.

== Education ==
Roberts obtained her medical degree from Glasgow University, learning embryology from Regius Professor of Anatomy Raymond Scothorne. She found the "most beautiful cells" under the microscope to be in the developing bone and bone marrow. After what she called a "dalliance with a career in obstetrics...(a complete failure)", Roberts trained in pediatrics at Glasgow's Royal Hospital for Sick Children. She furthered her training in pediatric hematology at Vanderbilt University and did her postdoctoral work at Imperial College London.

== Career ==
Roberts took a faculty position at Imperial College London, moving to the University of Oxford's Weatherall Institute of Molecular Medicine in 2013. She studied how blood cells develop in prenatal liver and bone marrow using single-cell multiomics to identify key gene patterns that differed in Down syndrome patients, as part of the Human Cell Atlas initiative. She published hundreds of papers on benign and malignant childhood blood disorders and has an h-index of 70.

== Awards ==
- Ham-Wasserman award and lectureship, American Society of Hematology, 2022
- Elected Fellow of the Academy of Medical Sciences, 2023

== Selected publications ==
- Neonatal Haematology: a Practical Guide (with Barbara J. Bain), Wiley-Blackwell, 2022. ISBN 978-1119371588
- Iskander D, Karadimitris A, Roberts I. "Harnessing Single-Cell Technologies in the Search for New Therapies for Diamond-Blackfan Anemia Syndrome". Experimental Hematology, 2024.
- Roberts I, Vyas P. "Sowing the seeds of leukemia before birth". Science, 2021.
- Popescu DM, Botting RA, Stephenson E, Green K, Roberts I, Göttgens B, Behjati S, Laurenti E, Teichmann SA, Haniffa M. "Decoding human fetal liver haematopoiesis". Nature, 2019.
- Roberts I, Fordham NJ, Rao A, Bain BJ. "Neonatal leukaemia". British Journal of Haematology, 2018.
- Roberts I, de la Fuente J. "Sickle cell disease: the price of cure". Blood, 2016.
- Roberts I, Izraeli S. "Haematopoietic development and leukaemia in Down syndrome". British Journal of Haematology, 2014.
- Chakravorty S, Roberts I. "How I manage neonatal thrombocytopenia". British Journal of Haematology, 2012.
- Roberts IA. "The changing face of haemolytic disease of the newborn". Early Human Development, 2008.
- Roberts IA, Murray NA. "Neonatal thrombocytopenia". Current Hematology Reports, 2006.
- Halsey C, Roberts IA. "The role of hydroxyurea in sickle cell disease". British Journal of Haematology, 2003.

== Personal life ==
Roberts juggled "a busy clinical job and two young children" while at her first faculty position.
