= Risurrezione =

1904 opera by Franco Alfano

- Opera by Franco Alfano
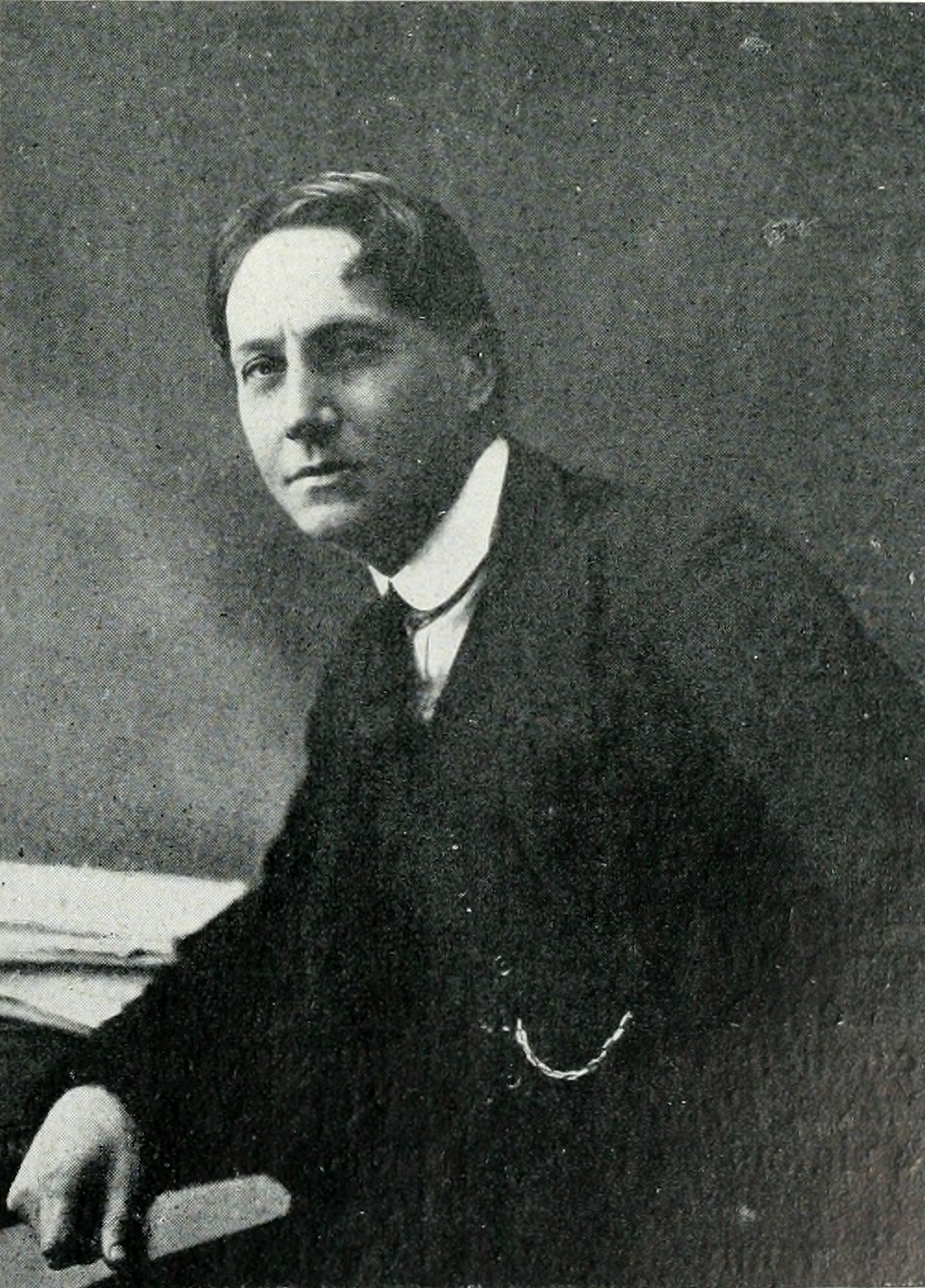
- The composer c. 1919
- Librettist: Cesare Hanau
- Language: Italian
- Based on: Leo Tolstoy's novel Resurrection
- Premiere: 30 November 1904; Teatro Vittorio Emanuele, Turin

Risurrezione (Resurrection), is an opera or dramma in four acts by Franco Alfano. The libretto was written by Camillo Antona Traversi and Cesare Hanau (only Hanau signed it), based on the 1899 novel Resurrection (Russian: Воскресение) by Leo Tolstoy. The first performance was given on 30 November 1904 in the Teatro Vittorio Emanuele, Turin, Italy.

== Performance history ==
Risurrezione was Alfano's most successful work. For performances at La Scala Milan in March 1906, Alfano made cuts to the score. It was translated into French by Paul Ferrier and performed in Brussels, beginning on 18 April 1906. It was translated into German by A. Brüggeman and performed at the Königliche Oper in Berlin, beginning on 5 October 1909. For the Berlin production, Alfano made further revisions to the score. In Italian, it was performed in Modena (18 February 1911), Novara (18 February 1911, altered version), Madrid (21 December 1911, altered version), Santiago, Chile (summer 1928), and at the Teatro Regio in Turin (6 January 1936). It was also given in French in Nice (8 March 1925), Chicago (31 December 1925), and in Paris at the Salle Favart by the Opéra-Comique (16 May 1927 and 10 April 1934), in a production by Albert Carré. The Opéra-Comique revivals starred Mary Garden as Catarina and René Maison as Prince Dimitri. Retitled Katjuscha, it was again translated into German by E. Orthmann and H. Hartleb and performed at the Volks-Oper in Berlin on 4 October 1938. The Opéra-Comique revived Ferrier's translation again on 15 May 1954, in a new production by Jean Doat with scenery and costumes by André Bakst. The American soprano Patricia Neway sang Caterina with an otherwise all French cast. By the end of 1954, the opera had been performed more than 1,000 times around the world.

The opera was performed at Fulham Town Hall, London, on 30 November 1967. It was successfully revived at the Wexford Festival Opera, beginning on 2 November 2018. The Wexford production was performed at the Florence May Festival in January 2020, and an HD video was released in 2021.

== Roles ==
Roles, voice types, premier cast
Role	Voice type	Premiere cast, 30 November 1904 Conductor: Tullio Serafin
Katerina Mihaylovna, named Katyusha	soprano	Elvira Magliulo
Prince Dimitri Ivanovich Nehlyudov	tenor	Oreste Mieli
Sofia Ivanovna, his aunt	mezzo-soprano	Elvira Ceresoli-Salvatori
Matryona Pavlovna, housekeeper	contralto	
Simonson Ivanovich, political convict	baritone	Angelo Scandiani
Anna, old peasant	contralto	
Korablyova, prisoner	contralto	
servant	contralto	
Vera, political convict	mezzo-soprano	
Fenyichka, prisoner	soprano	
Hunchback girl, prisoner	contralto	
Red-haired girl, prisoner	mezzo-soprano	
Krilycov, political convict	bass	José Beckmans
Chief guard	bass	
Guard	baritone	
Train-station officer	baritone	
Officer	tenor	
A woman	soprano	
Muzhik	baritone	
Two peasants	basses	
Three prisoners	2 sopranos / 1 contralto	
Kozak	baritone	
Church voices, Peasants, Prisoners in female prison, Political convicts, 8-year old girl

== Synopsis ==
Place: Russia and Siberia
Time: The end of 19th century

=== Act 1 ===
Prince Dimitri arrives to say goodbye to his aunt, Sophia Ivanovna, before leaving for the war. His old playmate Katiusha, a young peasant girl, is now Sophia Ivanovna's companion. Dimitri is overjoyed to meet her again and that night becomes her lover. The next day he leaves for the war.

=== Act 2 ===
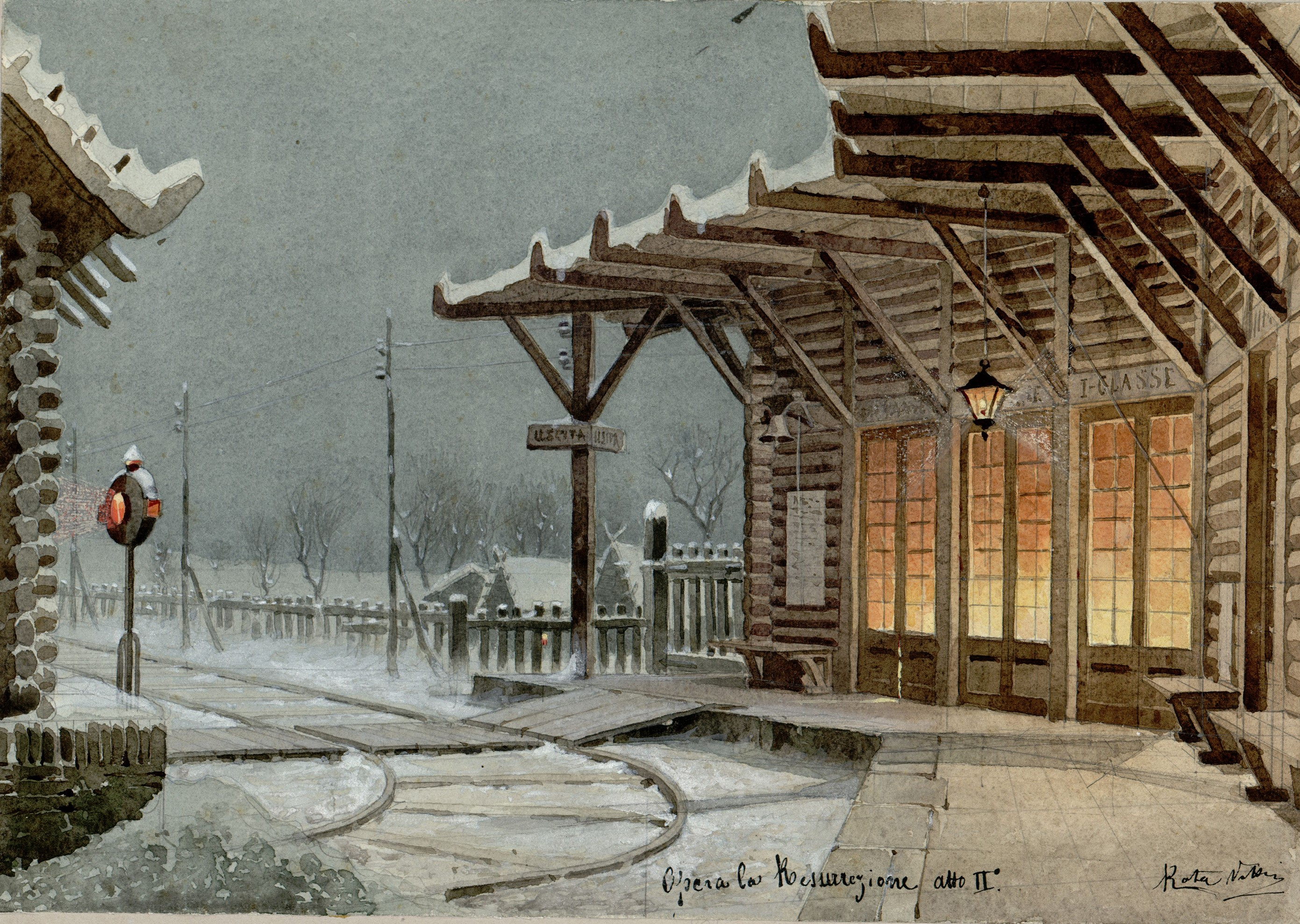
Set design for act 2 in a 1906 revival

The station of a small town. Katiusha, now pregnant, has been driven out of the house. She anxiously waits for Prince Dimitri who is due to pass through the station. But when she sees him arrive in the company of a prostitute, her courage fails her and she remains hidden until she goes away, pierced to her soul.

=== Act 3 ===
Prison in Saint Petersburg. Katiusha, broken by Dimitri's neglect of her and the death of her child, ends up in a place of debauchery. She is involved in a crime and, although innocent, is condemned for murder during a difficult trial, and is to be deported to Siberia. Before she leaves, Dimitri, now overcome with remorse, comes to see her in jail and offers to marry her. But she is in such a state of abject despair that she refuses all consolation.

=== Act 4 ===
On the road to Siberia. Katiusha has become herself again, the good sweet girl of former times. Prince Dimitri arrives. Simonson, a political prisoner, reveals he loves Katiusha, wants to marry her, and asks for the prince's consent. Dimitri says she is free to do what she wants. Dimitri shows Katiusha a letter, revealing she has been pardoned; he tells her Simonson loves her and wants to marry her, so she must choose between them. She says she will marry Simonson, because she loves him. Although she still loves Dimitri with all her soul, she tells him to leave. She has found new purpose in life helping other prisoners.

== Noted arias ==
- Si, la ravviso la mia cara stanza (Yes, I see my dear room...) – Arioso of Dimitri (Act 1)
- Qualcun giù in giardino?... È Katiusha!.. (Someone is in the garden?... It's Katyusha!...) – Duetto of Katerina and Dimitri (Act 1)
- Dio pietoso, fa ch'il venga alfin (Merciful Lord, make him come at last) – Aria of Katerina (Act 2)
- Piangi, si, piangi (Cry, yes, cry) – Arioso of Dimitri (Act 3)
- Quando la vidi, una voce mi disse (When I saw her, a voice said to me) – Aria of Simonson (Act 4)
- Ed ora, va... parti!... Son felice!!! (And now, go... leave!... I'm happy!) – Finale duetto of Katerina and Dimitri (Act 4)

== Orchestration ==
- 3 flutes (1 piccolo) / 3 oboes (1 English horn) / 3 clarinets (1 bass clarinet) / 2 bassoons / 1 contrabassoon
- 4 horns / 3 trumpets / 3 trombones / 1 tuba
- timpani / percussion (cymbals / triangle / bass drum) / tubular bells / xylophone / celesta / 2 harps / piano
- Violins / violas / cellos / double basses

== Recordings ==
- 1954 (monaural audio): Carla Gavazzi as Katinska, Nicola Filacuridi as Prince Dimitri; conducted by Oliviero De Fabritiis.
- 1973 (monaural audio): Magda Olivero as Katiusha Mikailovna, Giuseppe Gismondo as Prince Dimitri, Antonio Boyer as Simonson, Anna Di Stasio as Matrena Pavlovna, Nucci Condo as Anna, Vera Magrini as La Korableva, Patrizia Pace as Fedia, Marco Stafoni as Head Warden; Turin RAI Chorus and Orchestra, conducted by Elio Boncompagni; audio recording of a radio broadcast of 22 October 1971. Also includes a 1985 audio recording of the final scene of Turandot with Linda Kelm as Turandot and Jon Frederic West as Calaf, conducted by Christopher Keene.
- 2020 (HD video): Anne Sophie Duprels as Katerina Mihaylovna (Katyusha), Matthew Vickers as Prince Dimitri Ivanovitch Nehlyudov, Leon Kim as Simonson, Francesca Di Sauro as Sofia Ivanovna, Romina Tomasoni as Matryova Pavlovna/Anna, Nadia Pirazzini as Maidservant, Ana Victória Pitts as Vera/Korablyova, Barbara Marcacci as Fenyichka; Orchestra and Chorus of the Florence May Festival, conducted by Francesco Lanzillotta; stage director: Rosetta Cucchi; video director: Davide Mancini; recorded live on 17 and 21 January, 2020, Dynamic.

== See also ==
- Tod Machover, composer of the 1999 opera Resurrection, also based on Tolstoy's novel

== Sources ==
- Ashman, Mike (2021). Review of Alfano Risurrezione, Gramophone, May 2021, p. 74.
- Brown, William R. (2021). "Recordings > Opera and Oratorio: Alfano: Risurrezione", Opera News, vol. 86, no. 2 (August 2021).
- Kellow, Brian (2018). "In Review: Margherita, Risurrezione, Medea, Wexford Festival Opera", Opera News, vol. 82, no. 8 (February 2018).
- Loewenberg, Alfred (1978). Annals of Opera 1597–1940 (third edition, revised). Totowa, New Jersey: Rowman and Littlefield. ISBN 9780874718515.
- Maehder, Jürgen (1992). "Risurrezione", vol. 3, pp. 1350–1351, in The New Grove Dictionary of Opera, four volumes, edited by Stanley Sadie. London: Macmillan. ISBN 0935859926.
- Oliver, Michael (1993). "Alfano Risurrezione", Gramophone, October 1993, p. 110.
- Orselli, Cesare (2021). "Risurrezione by Franco Alfano", pp. 10–13 (English translation by Daniela Pilarz), in the booklet accompanying the Dynamic video recording. Blu-ray: OCLC 1250471895, 1236350090. DVD: OCLC 1268995806.
- Waterhouse, John C. G. (2001). "Franco Alfano", pp. 11–12, in The New Penguin Opera Guide, edited by Amanda Holden. London: Penguin Books. ISBN 9780140293128.
- Wolff, Stéphane (1953). Un demi-siècle d'Opéra-Comique (1900-1950). Paris: André Bonne. OCLC 44733987, 2174128, 78755097
