= Friedrich Haider =

Austrian conductor and pianist (born 1961)

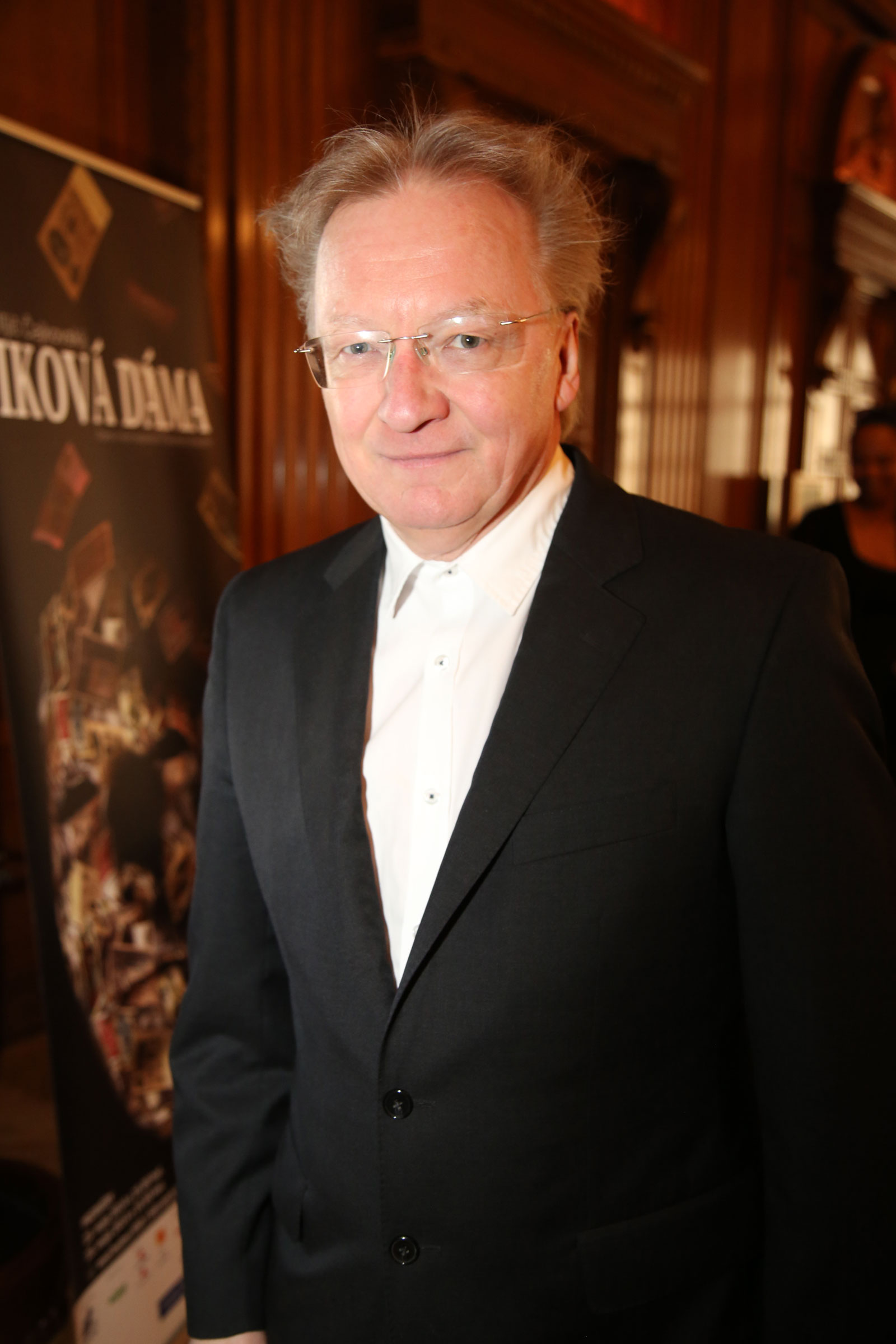
Friedrich Haider (2015)

Friedrich Haider (born 7 November 1961) is an Austrian conductor and pianist.

== Life and work ==
Haider is a graduate of the Anton Bruckner Private University Linz (piano with Martha Picker and conducting with Leopold Mayer), the University of Music and Performing Arts Vienna (conducting with Karl Österreicher and the International Summer Academy of Fine Arts Salzburg (master classes by Milan Horvat). His theatrical debut took place on 26 July 1984 in Klagenfurt with Johann Strauss II' Wiener Blut. In the concert hall he introduced himself in the same year for the first time on the podium of the Vienna Chamber Orchestra. After various stations as an assistant, he developed a repertoire at mainly smaller opera houses, which today comprises more than 60 titles and combines the most diverse subjects and styles.

Haider has repeatedly devoted himself to Italian bel canto, achieving personal success above all with his discovery of Roberto Devereux by Donizetti – especially in 2004 at the Bavarian State Opera. After his successful debut in 2002 at the Vienna State Opera, he conducted repertory performances at that house over seven seasons, including the traditional New Year's Eve performance of Johann Strauss' Die Fledermaus three times. In 2006, he made his debut at New York's Metropolitan Opera with Verdi's Rigoletto, and in 2011 accepted his first invitation to the Staatsoper Unter den Linden (Mozart: Die Entführung aus dem Serail).

Highlights of his theatre work to date include Verdi's Otello (at the Tivoli Festival Copenhagen), Gounod's Faust (at the Bavarian State Opera Munich), Mozart's Die Entführung aus dem Serail (at the Semperoper Dresden), Wagner's Lohengrin (in Barcelona) and Tristan und Isolde (in Nice) as well as Strauss' Salome (at the Tokyo National Opera) and Weber's Der Freischütz (at the Teatro La Fenice in Venice).

Haider was guest conductor among others of the following orchestras: London Symphony, Czech Philharmonic, Staatskapelle Dresden, Bruckner Orchester Linz, Gothenburg Symphony, Milan Chamber Orchestra, Tokyo Philharmonic and Symphonic.

From 1991 to 1994 Haider served as chief conductor of the Opéra national du Rhin in Strasbourg.

Since 1971 Haider has maintained close, friendly contact with the Austrian artist Ernst Fuchs. He collects Fuchs' early work (1945 to 1960s) and has also published about him.

Haider is married. Previously, he had a long relationship with Edita Gruberová, with whom he also worked closely professionally. (Note: In some publications it is stated that both were married to each other. Other sources deny that explicitly.) Thus, in 1992, they had both founded a record label that published bel canto parts by the singer. The two separated in 2007.

=== Oviedo Filarmonia ===
In 2004, Haider became principal conductor of the Oviedo Filarmonia in northern Spain, a position he held until 2011 with two contract extensions. He performed 30 concert programmes with the orchestra and gave guest performances in Madrid, Tokyo Bunka Kaikan hall, and the Théâtre des Champs-Élysées, Paris. For the label Naxos he recorded Verdi's Otello and several works by Ermanno Wolf-Ferrari with the orchestra. In 2011, Haider was awarded the Gold Medal of the Auditorium Principe Felipe for his work.

=== Works by Ermanno Wolf-Ferrari ===
In 2002, in a London second-hand bookshop, Haider came across a score of Ermanno Wolf-Ferrari's opera buffa Il segreto di Susanna. He revised the score and put the work on the programme of a concert with the Munich Radio Orchestra (Judith Howarth, Renato Bruson, Munich Radio Orchestra, Munich 2003).

In 2008, the CD label Philartis Vienna released the one-act opera Il segreto di Susanna (Judith Howard, Angel Oden, Oviedo Filarmonia) as well as the world premiere recording of the composer's orchestral suites. The recording of the Concerto for Violin and Orchestra in D major, Op. 26 (soloist: Benjamin Schmid) was released by Farao Classics as the beginning of a Wolf-Ferrari Edition, a recording that was awarded the Preis der deutschen Schallplattenkritik (Quarterly List 2013/1). At the Slovak National Theatre in Bratislava, Haider conducted Wolf-Ferrari's I gioielli della Madonna as the Slovak premiere in 2015.

=== Slovak National Theatre ===
On 1 August 2012, Haider took over the position of music director at the Slovak National Theatre in Bratislava, which had been created for him. This title combined the position of opera director with that of chief conductor. In accordance with the personal wish of the Minister of Culture Marek Maďarič, Haider wanted to take on the challenge of making the house competitive in Europe. Representatives of German directorial theatre such as Peter Konwitschny, Hans-Joachim Ruckhäberle and Martin Schüler were attracted to the house with premieres of Puccini's La bohème, Richard Strauss' Salome and Verdi's Rigoletto as well as internationally active vocal soloists. Haider's new productions of Wagner's Lohengrin and Mozart's La clemenza di Tito were awarded the Slovak Critics' Prize. At the beginning of 2015, the Ministry of Culture made a budget cut at the National Theatre and, almost simultaneously, increased the salaries of the neighbouring Philharmonic Orchestra by a total of 1.5 million euros. The ministry's unwillingness to justify this action prompted Haider to resign as music director in June 2016. The following season, Haider became principal guest conductor of the Opera and Philharmonic in Essen.

=== Musicae Antiquae Collegium Varsoviense ===
On the occasion of a new production of Mozart's Così fan tutte at the Warsaw Chamber Opera in January 2017, Haider conducted the Musicae Antiquae Collegium Varsoviense for the first time. The performances were followed by a re-invitation with Mozart's The Magic Flute. At the opening of the 2017 Warsaw Mozart Festival, Haider again led the orchestra in a concert performance of Mozart's Don Giovanni at the National Philharmonic, Warsaw, and was subsequently appointed its principal conductor as of 1 September 2017.

== Awards ==
- 1979: Talentförderungsprämie des Landes Oberösterreich (composition)
- 2002: Preis der Deutschen Schallplattenkritik (Richard Strauss: Die Orchesterlieder, integral)
- 2011: Goldmedaille des Auditoriums Principe Felipe Oviedo
- 2013: Preis der Deutschen Schallplattenkritik (Ermanno Wolf-Ferrari: Konzert für Violine und Orchester D-Dur op. 26)

== Publications ==
- Friedrich Haider (editor and co-author): Ernst Fuchs – Zeichnungen und Graphik aus der frühen Schaffensperiode – 1942 bis 1959. Löcker-Verlag, Vienna 2003, ISBN 3-85409-387-X
