= Il dottor Antonio (opera) =

- Opera by Franco Alfano
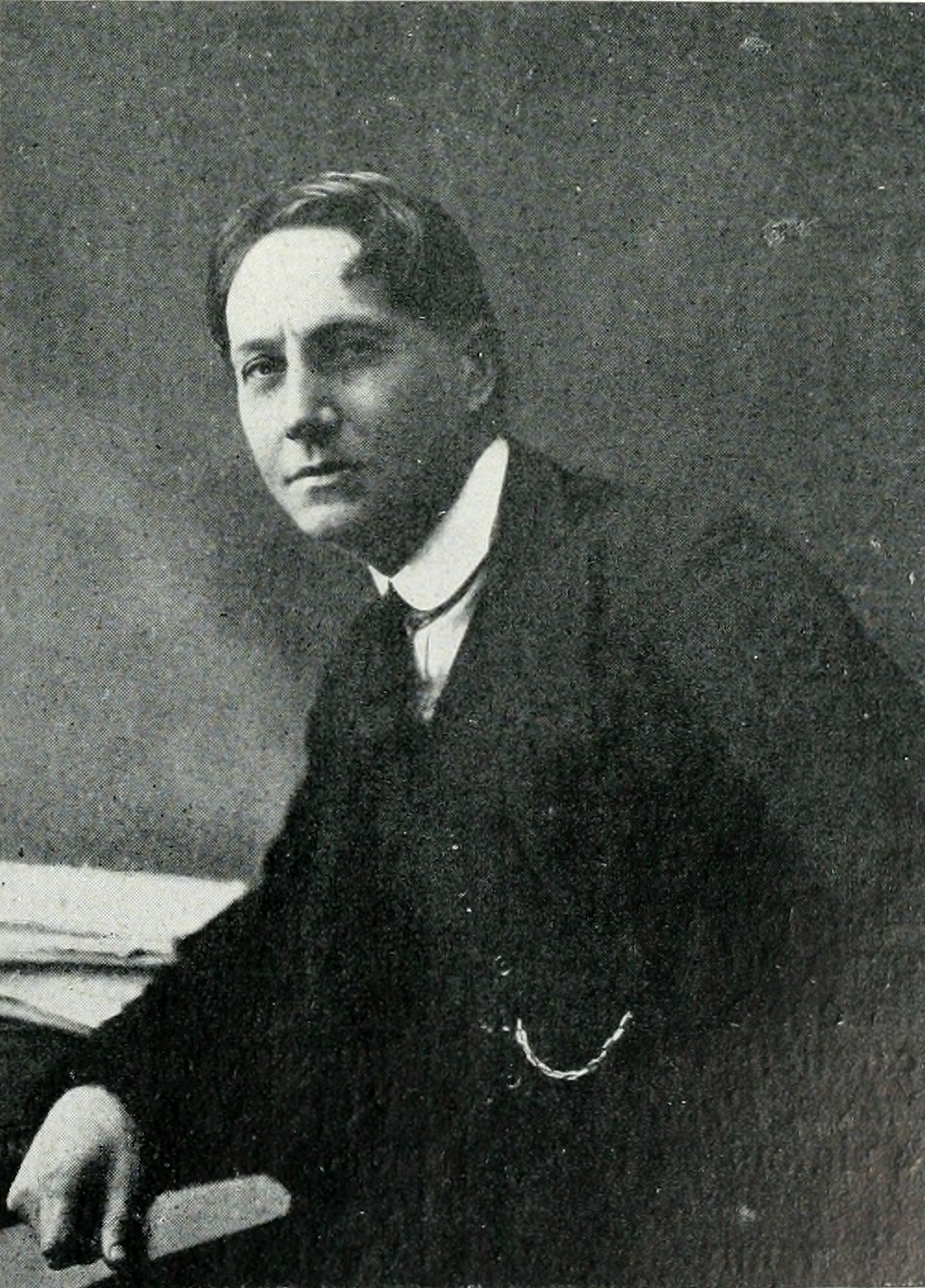
- The composer c. 1919
- Librettist: Mario Ghisalberti
- Language: Italian
- Based on: Giovanni Ruffini's Doctor Antonio

Il dottor Antonio is a 1949 opera by Franco Alfano to a libretto by Mario Ghisalberti based on the 1855 nationalist novel by the Italian writer Giovanni Ruffini.

== Recording ==
- Giacinto Prandelli (Dottor Antonio), Carla Gavazzi (Lucy), Angela Vercelli (Speranza), Ortensia Beggiato (Madre di Speranza), Mario Boriello (Rey de Napoles); conducted by Alfredo Simonetto 1953
