= Francesco Lanzillotta =

Italian conductor and composer (born 1977)

- Born: 1977 (age 48–49); Rome, Italy
- Education: Accademia Nazionale di Santa Cecilia
- Occupations: Conductor; Composer
- Organizations: Filarmonica Arturo Toscanini
- Website: www.francescolanzillotta.com/en/

Francesco Lanzillotta (born 1977) is an Italian conductor and composer. As a conductor, he is focused on Italian opera, including contemporary works. He has conducted internationally, such as Verdi's La traviata in Varna, Bulgaria, Nabucco at the Deutsche Oper Berlin, Puccini's La bohème at the Bavarian State Opera, and Dallapiccola's Ulisse at Oper Frankfurt. He has conducted music by contemporary Italian composers.

== Career ==
Lanzillotta was born in Rome. He studied there at the Accademia Nazionale di Santa Cecilia, piano with Velia De Vit, and composition with Luciano Pelosi. He took master classes with Harold Farberman and George Pehlivanian. Lanzillotta is a regular conductor at Italian opera houses such as La Fenice in Venice, Teatro Regio in Parma, Teatro Verdi in Triest, Teatro di San Carlo in Naples and Teatro Lirico di Cagliari. He has conducted orchestras including the RAI National Symphony Orchestra, the Orchestra i Pomeriggi Musicali in Milan, the Orchestra della Svizzera Italiana and the Orchestra della Toscana in Florence. He is interested in music of the 20th and 21st centuries, such as Giorgio Battistelli, Ada Gentile, Ennio Morricone, Michele Dall'Ongaro, Marcello Panni and Francesco Pennisi.

In 2010, Lanzillotta became principal guest conductor at the opera house of Varna, Bulgaria, where he conducted productions of Mozart's Le nozze di Figaro, Verdi's La traviata, Bizet's Carmen, Mascagni's Cavalleria rusticana, Leoncavallo's Pagliacci and Puccini's La bohème and Tosca. From 2014, he was conductor of the Filarmonica Arturo Toscanini in Parma for four years. He first conducted at the Bavarian State Opera in Munich Puccini's La bohème. His first work at the Deutsche Oper Berlin was Verdi's Nabucco in 2018. In 2020, he conducted a DVD recording of Alfano's opera Risurrezione, directed by Rosetta Cucchi, with chorus and orchestra of the Maggio Musicale Fiorentino, and Ana Victória Pitts and Anne-Sophie Duprels in leading roles.

In 2022, he conducted a new production of Dallapiccola's Ulisse at Oper Frankfurt, directed by Tatjana Gürbaca, with Iain MacNeil in the title role, Juanita Lascarro as Penelope and Danylo Matviienko as Antinoos. A reviewer from Neue Musikzeitung noted that the music was rendered with precision, colourful and expressive. A reviewer from Süddeutsche Zeitung wrote that Lanzillotta was aware of details, did "not shy away from agglomerations of sound" ("scheut Klangballungen nicht"), but emphasized the flow of Ulisse's search for identity.

== Recordings ==
=== Audio ===
- Bizet: Carmen. (Euro Opera 3998, 2019.)

Irene Roberts (Carmen), Matthew Ryan Vickers (Don José), David Bizic (Escamillo), Valentina Mastrangelo (Micaëla), Gaetano Triscari (Zuniga), Stefano Marchiso (Moralès), Saverio Pugliese (Remendado), Tommaso Barea (Dancaïre). Conductor: Francesco Lanzillotta, Orchestra Filarmonica Marchigiana
