= Irene Roberts (mezzo-soprano) =

American mezzo-soprano

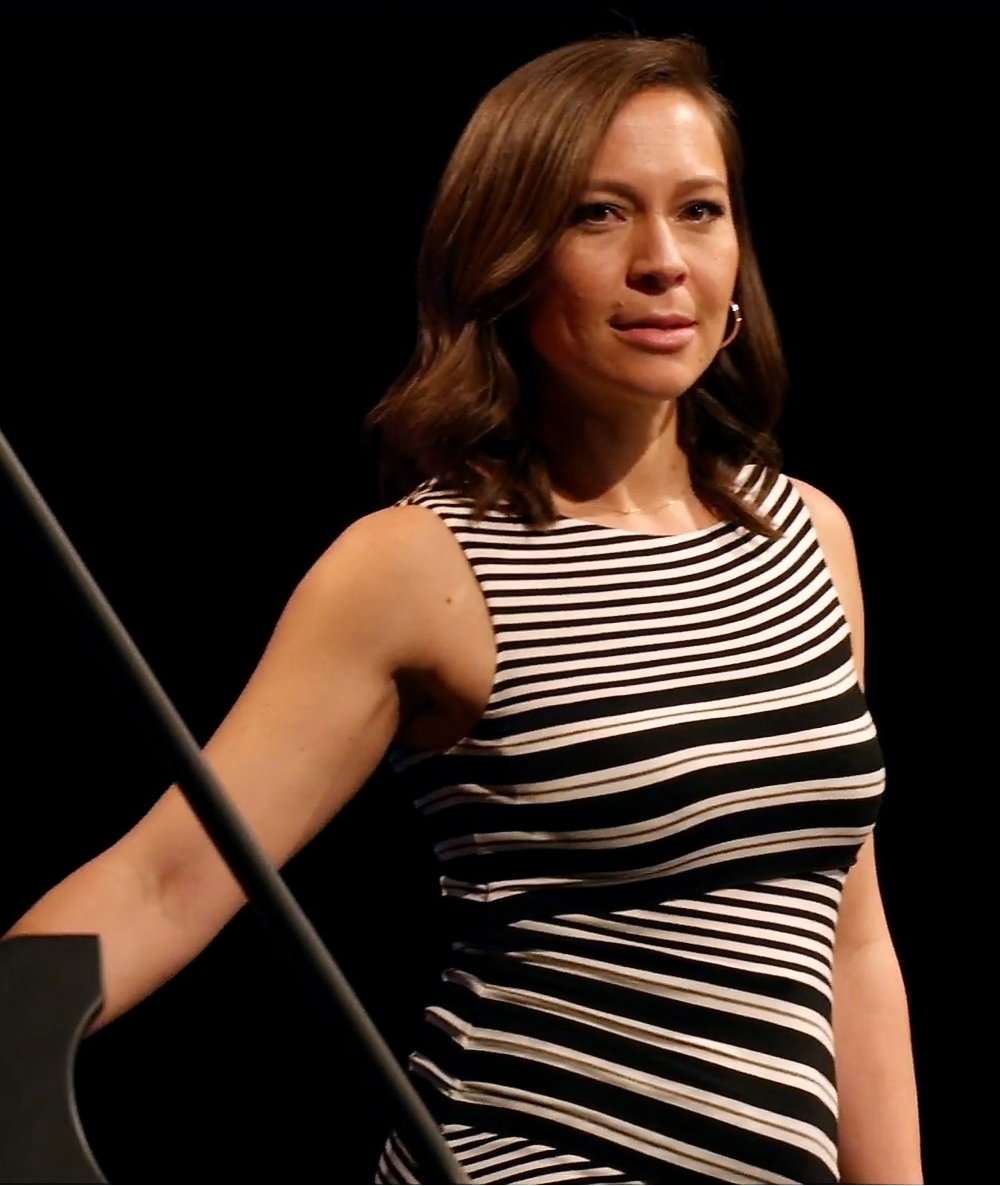
- Roberts in 2020 at the Deutsche Oper Berlin
- Born: California
- Citizenship: United States
- Education: University of the Pacific, Cleveland Institute of Music
- Occupation: Mezzo-soprano
- Website: www.irenerobertsmezzo.com

Irene Roberts is an American mezzo-soprano.

== Early life and education ==
Irene Roberts was born and raised in Sacramento, California and attended the Sacramento Waldorf School before earning her undergraduate degree from the University of the Pacific and her master's degree from the Cleveland Institute of Music. She won 2nd prize in the Advanced Division at the 41st Annual Palm Beach Opera Vocal Competition and was a finalist for the 2014 Richard Tucker Career Grant.

== Career ==
Irene Roberts made her Metropolitan Opera debut in The Marriage of Figaro in 2012, and in 2013 debuted at San Francisco Opera in Les Contes d'Hoffmann.

Since 2015 she has been a member of the ensemble of the Deutsche Oper Berlin where she has performed roles including The Muse/Nicklausse in Offenbach's Les Contes d'Hoffmann, the title role of Bizet's Carmen, Hansel in Humperdink's Hansel and Gretel, and Urbain in Meyerbeer's Les Huguenots.

In 2016 she created the role of Bao Chai in the world premiere of Bright Sheng's Dream of the Red Chamber at San Francisco Opera. She also made her London recital debut at Wigmore Hall with tenor Bryan Hymel.

Roberts made her debut in Amsterdam as The Muse in a new production of Les Contes d'Hoffmann in 2018. In 2019 she made her house debut at La Fenice in Venice with her first performances of Amneris in Verdi's Aida.

== Repertory ==
Role	Composer	Opera	Locations
Amneris	Giuseppe Verdi	Aida	La Fenice
Der Komponist	Richard Strauss	Ariadne auf Naxos	Palm Beach Opera
Carmen	Georges Bizet	Carmen	Deutsche Oper Berlin, San Francisco Opera, Macerata Opera, Teatro dell'Opera di Roma, Komische Oper Berlin
Lola	Pietro Mascagni	Cavalleria rusticana	Deutsche Oper Berlin
Bao Chai	Bright Sheng	Dream of the Red Chamber	San Francisco Opera
Siébel	Charles Gounod	Faust	Deutsche Oper Berlin, Baltimore Lyric Opera
Hänsel	Engelbert Humperdinck	Hänsel und Gretel	Deutsche Oper Berlin
Rosina	Gioachino Rossini	il Barbiere di Siviglia	Deutsche Oper Berlin, Baltimore Lyric Opera
Sélika	Giacomo Meyerbeer	L'Africaine	Oper Frankfurt
Isabella	Gioachino Rossini	L'italiana in Algeri	Lyric Opera of Kansas City
Marguerite	Hector Berlioz	La damnation de Faust	Deutsche Oper Berlin
Cherubino	Wolfgang Amadeus Mozart	Le Nozze di Figaro	Deutsche Oper Berlin, Palm Beach Opera
La Muse/Nicklausse	Jacques Offenbach	Les Contes d'Hoffmann	Deutsche Oper Berlin, Palm Beach Opera, Dutch National Opera
Giulietta	Jacques Offenbach	Les Contes d'Hoffmann	San Francisco Opera
Urbain	Giacomo Meyerbeer	Les Huguenots	Deutsche Oper Berlin
Fenena	Giuseppe Verdi	Nabucco	Deutsche Oper Berlin
Venus	Richard Wagner	Tannhäuser	Stadttheater Klagenfurt, Bayreuther Festspiele
Kundry	Richard Wagner	Parsifal	Staatsoper Hannover, Deutsche Oper Berlin, Bayerische Staatsoper, Tiroler Festpiele Erl
Brangaene	Richard Wagner	Tristan und Isolde	Deutsche Oper Berlin, Teatro Massimo Palermo, Swedish Radio Orchestra

== Recordings ==
=== Audio ===
- Bizet: Carmen. (Euro Opera 3998, 2019.)

Irene Roberts (Carmen), Matthew Ryan Vickers (Don José), David Bizic (Escamillo), Valentina Mastrangelo (Micaëla), Gaetano Triscari (Zuniga), Stefano Marchiso (Moralès), Saverio Pugliese (Remendado), Tommaso Barea (Dancaïre). Conductor: Francesco Lanzillotta, Orchestra Filarmonica Marchigiana

== Personal life ==
Irene Roberts currently resides in Berlin with her husband and two children.
