= Sakùntala =

La leggenda di Sakùntala
- Opera by Franco Alfano
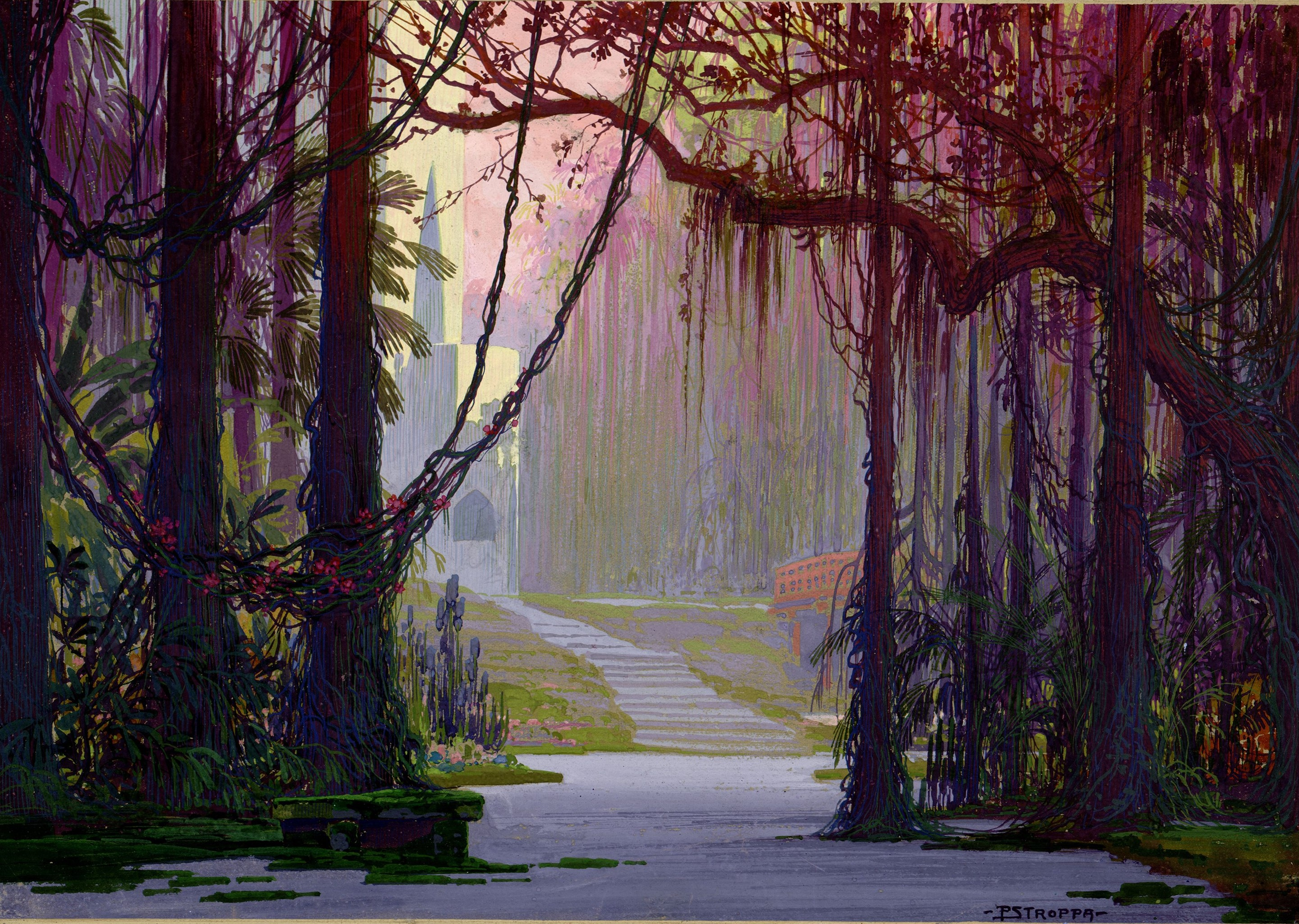
- Grassy shelf in a forest, sketch by Pietro Stroppa for La leggenda di Sakùntala (1921) - Archivio Storico Ricordi
- Other title: Sakùntala (1945 reconstruction)
- Librettist: Alfano
- Language: Italian
- Based on: Kālidāsa's Shakuntala
- Premiere: 10 December 1921; Teatro Comunale di Bologna

La leggenda di Sakùntala is a three-act opera by Franco Alfano, who wrote his own libretto based on Kālidāsa's 5th-century-CE drama Shakuntala. It was completed in 1920. When the score was believed lost in wartime bombing, Alfano reconstructed it, in 1945, now titling it simply Sakùntala, but in 2006 a copy of the original was found.

== Premiere, loss and rediscovery ==
La leggenda di Sakùntala was first performed on 10 December 1921 at the Teatro Comunale di Bologna. The full score and orchestral materials were believed destroyed when an Allied bomb hit the archives of Alfano's publisher, Ricordi, during World War II, so Alfano reconstructed the opera in 1945, shortening its name, and a second "premiere" followed at the Teatro dell'Opera in Rome on 5 January 1952. Decades later, during preparations for a revival in Rome in 2006, the original 1920 score was found in the Ricordi archives, and so the opera was performed once again in its original form and with its original title.

== Recent performances and filming ==
Critically regarded as Alfano's best work, La leggenda di Sakùntala was performed seven times for Italian radio between its premiere and 1979. These broadcasts featured such sopranos as Magda Olivero, Anna de Cavalieri and Celestina Casapietra. The opera was revived at the Wexford Opera Festival in 1982 and in concert on November 19, 2013, by Teatro Grattacielo in New York. In 2016 it was staged and filmed at the Teatro Massimo in Catania with soprano Silvia dalla Benetta and Nikša Bareza conducting, a production released on DVD on the Bongiovanni label.

== Roles ==
Roles, voice types, premiere casts
Role	Voice type	Premiere cast, 10 December 1921 conductor: Tullio Serafin	Premiere of the reconstruction, 5 January 1952 conductor: Gianandrea Gavazzeni
Sakùntala, a young woman of royal origin	soprano	Augusta Concato-Piccaluga	V P Aguero
Priyamvada, Sakùntala's friend	mezzo-soprano	Anna Manarini	Fernanda Cadoni
Anusuya, Sakùntala's friend	soprano	Gina Pedroni	Mafalda Micheluzzi
Dushyanta, the King	tenor	Nino Piccaluga	Roberto Turrini
His weapon bearer	baritone	Luigi Bolpagni	Titta Ruffo
Kanva, leader of the hermits	bass	Bruno Carmassi	Giulio Neri
A young hermit	tenor	Carlo Bonfanti	Adelio Zagonara
Durvasas, an ascetic	bass	Enrico Spada	Bruno Sbalchiero
Harita	bass	Ugo Cannetti	Carlo Platania
A fisherman	tenor	Edmondo Orlandi	Paolo Caroli
A guard	bass		Virgilio Stocco

== Synopsis ==
=== Act 1 ===
The King encounters Sakùntala while hunting with his men near the remote woodland monastery where she lives. The King woos her, and overcoming her initial fear, promises that he will return, giving her a ring by which to remember him.

=== Act 2 ===
Daydreaming about the King, Sakùntala fails to hear the hermit Durvasas's entreaties to open the monastery's gate to admit him. Angered, he curses Sakùntala, proclaiming that the King would not remember her. Sakùntala begs a cloud to carry a message to the King. Harita returns to the monastery, and tells Sakùntala that she is with child.

=== Act 3 ===
The King is restless, and not entertained by the dancing girls who perform for him. Sakùntala arrives with her entourage, but when she attempts to present her ring of remembrance to the King, she realizes that she has lost it. The curse is fulfilled, and Sakùntala rushes out of the palace to drown herself in a lake. However, belatedly, a fisherman arrives, having found the ring, and presents it to the King, who suddenly remembers Sakùntala. Servants enter, bearing Sakùntala's infant child, and the King cries out in anguish. But Sakùntala's voice descends from heaven (having been taken up into the heavens by a cloud of fire), and tells the King not to despair, for their child will become the hero of the future age. All the people kneel and worship the infant.

== Recordings ==
- Sakuntala. Anna de Cavalieri, Antonio Annaloro, Plinio Clabassi cond. Arturo Basile 1955
- DVD Silvia dalla Benetta (Sakuntala) Enrique Ferrer (Il Re) stage dir. Massimo Gasparon cond. Nikša Bareza, live recording from the Teatro Massimo Bellini, Catania, Italy November 2016
