= Giovanni Ruffini =

Italian politician and writer (1808–1881)

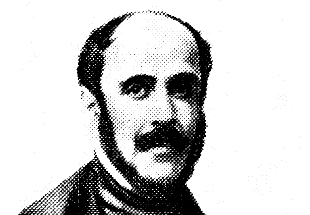
- Giovanni Ruffini
- Born: 20 September 1807; Genoa, First French Empire, now Italy
- Died: 3 November 1881 (aged 74); Taggia, Italy
- Occupations: Writer, patriot
- Writing career
- Period: 19th century
- Genre: Romance novel
- Notable work: Doctor Antonio

Giovanni Ruffini (1807 in Genoa – 1881) was an Italian writer and patriot of the early 19th century. He is chiefly known for having written the draft of the libretto of the opera Don Pasquale for its composer Gaetano Donizetti.

== Don Pasquale ==
Ruffini had been condemned to death as an enemy of the state and was living in exile in Paris in 1842 when it was suggested to him by Jules Janin (newly appointed director of Théâtre-Italien) that he might offer his services to Donizetti as a librettist . Donizetti told him exactly what he required for his latest opera project, Don Pasquale, but not that he intended to re-use music already written for other purposes. Ruffini duly wrote the draft libretto from the original text dating back to 1810, but Donizetti changed so much of Ruffini's version that the librettist became angry and refused to allow his name to be mentioned in the programme for the première at the Théâtre Italien in Paris on 3 January 1843.

Although Ruffini refused acknowledgement of his work for the libretto, Donizetti paid him 500 francs, which was competitive for both the length and the genre at the time. Ruffini also reportedly enjoyed working with Donizetti in the early stages of their collaboration, though he wrote to family and friends that the composer continually pressed him to work faster.

== Novels ==
Ruffini wrote seven novels in English:

- Lorenzo Benoni Or Passages in the Life of an Italian (1853),
- Doctor Antonio: A Tale (1855),
- The Paragreens on a Visit to the Paris Universal Exhibition (1856),
- Lavinia (1861),
- Vincenzo; or, Sunken Rocks (1863),
- A Quiet Nook in the Jura (1867)

Many of these were published as 'by the author of Lorenzo Benoni,' and some sought to raise the sympathy of people in England and France for the struggles of the Italian people during the Risorgimento.
