= Leopoldo Mugnone =

Italian composer

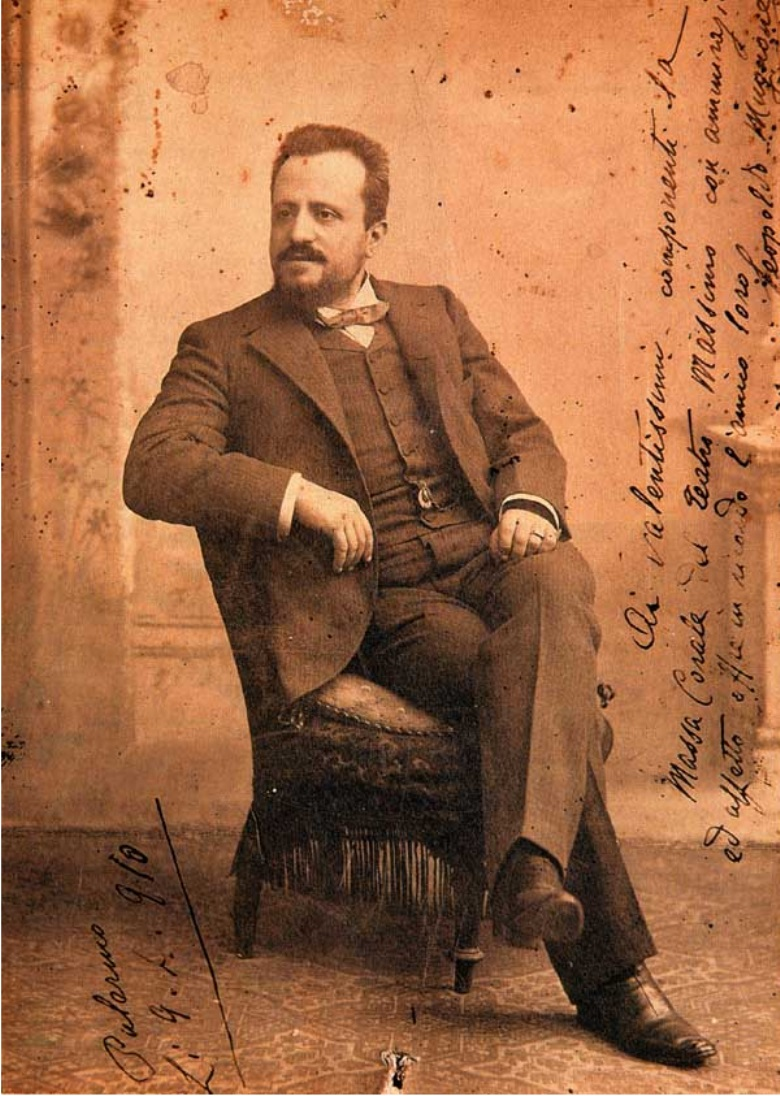

Leopoldo Mugnone (29 September 1858 in Naples – 22 December 1941 in Capodichino, Naples) was an Italian conductor, especially of opera, whose most famous work was done in the period 1890–1920, both in Europe and South America. He conducted various operatic premieres, and was also a composer of operas.

== Training ==
The son of Antonio Mugnone, principal double-bass in the orchestra of the San Carlo Theatre in Naples, Mugnone studied from an early age at the Royal Conservatorio of San Pietro a Maiella under Paolo Serrao and Beniamino Cesi. He composed his first theatre work, a little opera buffa Il Dottor Bartolo Salsapariglia, at the age of 12, in which he wished to take part in the basso comico role, though he had then only an alto voice. At 16 he began conducting. A year later he was recruited as a chorus director for an operetta troupe at the Teatro Nuovo, run by F. Sadowsky. From there he went on to the Garibaldi Theatre, first as chorus master and later as concertatore. Two other early operettas by him, Don Bizzarro e le sue figlie (1 act), and Mamma Angot al serraglio di Costantinopoli (3 acts) were produced during the later 1870s at Naples.

Mugnone was himself the teacher of the conductor Uriel Nespoli.

== Early career ==
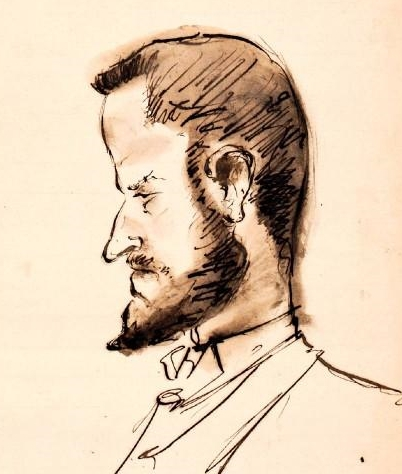
Leopoldo Mugnone in a 1896 caricature

Mugnone established his reputation in Italy and beyond, and conducted a tour with the double-bass player Bottesini. In 1887 at the Costanzi Theatre (Rome) in a single season he conducted La forza del destino and Filippo Marchetti's Ruy Blas. After this the publisher Sonzogno, recognising his potential, took him under his wing: in 1888 he was promoted to conduct at La Scala, at the Théâtre de la Gaîté in Paris, and at the Municipale in Nice (amongst others). According to Giuseppe Depanis, a Carmen of his of 1888, with Luisa Borghi, at the Carignano in Turin was the last artistic experience enjoyed by Friedrich Nietzsche before madness overtook him.

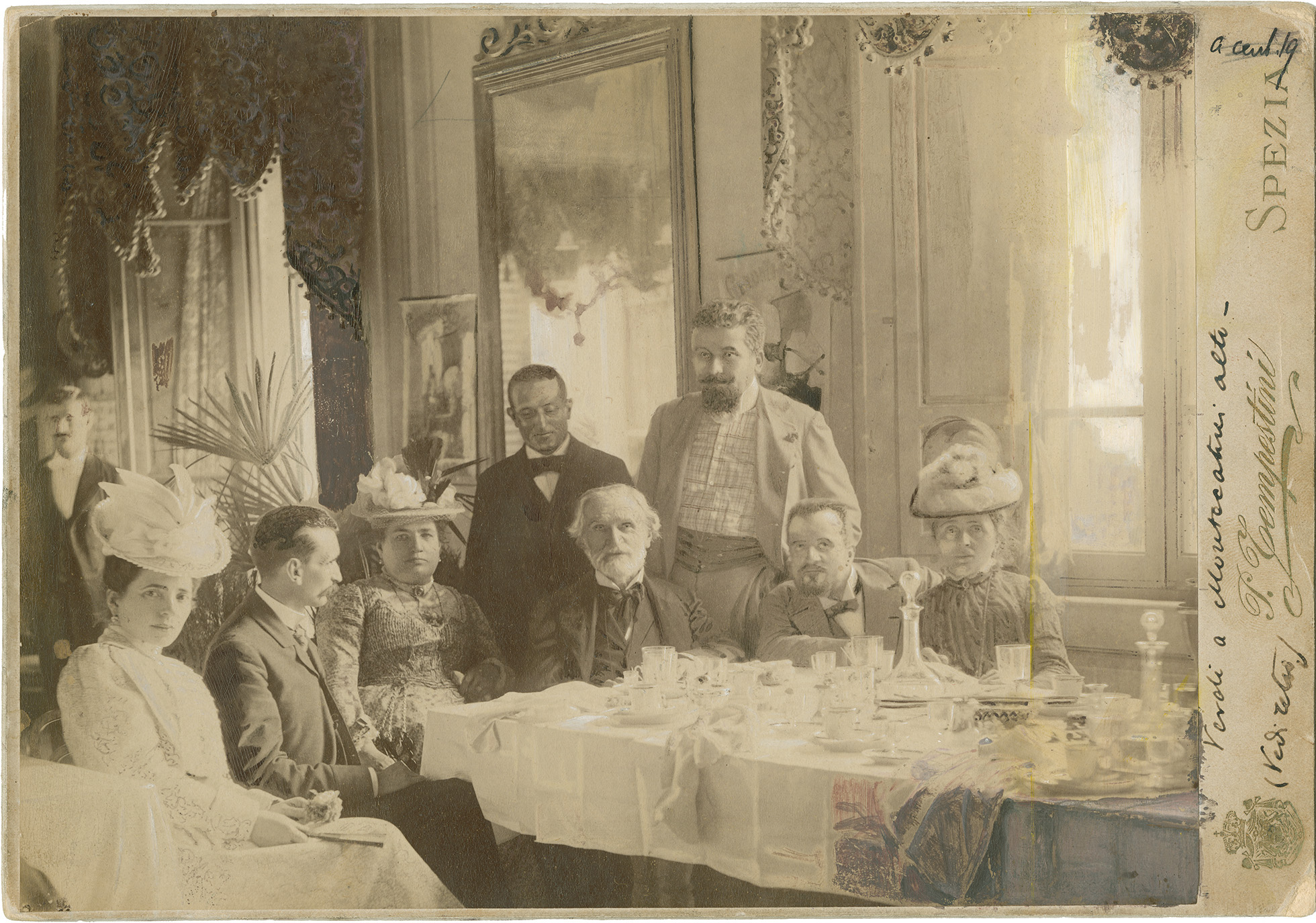
Leopoldo Mugnone (sitting at right) in a 1899 photograph with (among others) Giuseppina Pasqua, Teresa Stolz and Giuseppe Verdi in Montecatini Terme.

Mugnone was very esteemed by Verdi, who especially admired his performances of Otello and Falstaff, and became a friend of the conductor. After a May 1894 performance of Falstaff at the Paris Opera, Boito wrote to Verdi: "Mugnone has understood the entire score with a great power of penetration." With the same work Mugnone gave the inaugural concert of the Teatro Massimo at Palermo on 16 May 1897. A story goes that he once got hold of a score with Toscanini's annotations and flung it from him, saying: "Bah! Puzza di Parma!" (It stinks of Parma). The Verdi centenary celebrations of October 1913, at La Scala, opened with a memorable performance of Nabucco which he arranged and directed.

His own compositions, however, and many of his most important premieres, were in the field of verismo opera. In 1890 he conducted the sensational premiere of Mascagni's Cavalleria rusticana (who had won the Concorso Sonzogno with this work), at the Costanzi with Gemma Bellincioni and Roberto Stagno. After this he was sought out by composers of the young school as one likely to be sympathetic to their work. His own one-act opera Il biricchino (Venice 1892) did not fare well in Vienna, for after it was presented at the Teatro dell’Esposizione in 1892, the critic Hanslick pronounced it to be a mediocre and objectionable thing. It appeared in Barcelona in 1893. Mugnone became famous for other revivals of important operas, including Gluck's Orfeo, Rossini's Guglielmo Tell, and Berlioz's La Damnation de Faust in its original form as an oratorio. During the Exhibition of 1899 he directed a Grand Opera season in Paris.

Mugnone conducted the world premiere of Tosca in Rome in 1900 (including interruptions for a bomb scare). His own opera Vita Brettona was premiered at Naples in 1905. Between 1904 and 1906 he had busy seasons at Covent Garden, performing 'Andrea Chénier (with Strakosch, Zenatello, Sammarco), Don Giovanni (Strakosch and Battistini), Madama Butterfly (with Rina Giachetti), Faust and La traviata (with Melba), Manon Lescaut, La bohème, Tosca, Mefistofele, Aida, Un ballo in maschera, and Rigoletto (with Melba, Stracciari, and Battistini). He gave the first London performances of Cilea's Adriana Lecouvreur (November 1904) and Giordano's Fedora (November 1906, with Giachetti and Zenatello).

He gave the first performance of Franchetti's La figlia di Iorio (on a text by d'Annunzio) at La Scala in 1906. (Like Mugnone, Franchetti had been a student of Serrao). He conducted for Eugenia Burzio's famous La Scala debut in March 1906 as Katiusha in the Risurrezione of Franco Alfano (another Serrao pupil). In 1910 (17 March) he gave the premiere of Giordano's Mese Mariano at the Teatro Massimo.

Other Italian premieres of this period given by him were:

- Carlotta Clépier by Pietro Floridia (Naples, Circo Nazionale, May 1882);
- Regina e Contadina di Sarria (Naples, Teatro dei Fiorentini, 24 June 1882, with Gemma Bellincioni and Antonio Pini-Corsi);
- Medgé by Spyridon Samaras (Rome, Costanzi, 11 Dec. 1888, with Emma Calvé and De Vries);
- Il Conte di Gléichen by Salvatore Auteri-Manzocchi (Rome, season of 1888–89);
- Le Cid by Massenet (first Rome production);
- Patria by Emile Paladilhe. (Rome, autumn 1888);
- Djamileh by Bizet, (Rome, season of 1889–90, with Bellincioni);
- Orfeo by Gluck, (revival, Rome 1889);
- Labilia by N. Spinelli (Rome, 9 May 1890, with Bellincioni and Stagno);
- Andrea del Sarto by Baravalle and Spartacus by Pietro Platania (Rome, season 1890–91, with Mme Marconi and Cattaneo);
- Rudello by Vincenzo Ferroni (Rome, 28 May 1890, with Bellincioni e Stagno);
- I Pagliacci by Leoncavallo (first at Rome, Teatro Nazionale, 1892);
- Le Villi by Puccini (first Rome production, Costanzi, 28 October 1899, with Pasini and R. Galli);
- Werther by Massenet (first Rome production, 30 December 1899, with Savelli and De Luca);
- Sapho by Massenet (first Rome production, 20 March 1900, with Bellincioni and Moreo);
- Le Maschere by Mascagni (Naples, San Carlo, 19 January 1901, with Angelica Pandolfini, Giachetti e Schiavazzi).

== South America ==
It was through Sonzogno that Mugnano began to develop his work in operatic seasons in Argentina and elsewhere in South America, where he made a significant impact. In Buenos Aires he gave the first South American Die Meistersinger von Nürnberg (in Italian) in August 1898. He conducted premieres in Uruguay of Die Walküre, Tosca, Zazà, Don Giovanni, Franchetti's Germania, Thaïs and his own Vita Brettona, and in 1910 conducted Götterdämmerung and Gustave Charpentier's Louise.

== Later tours ==
Between May and August 1919 he conducted a Covent Garden Italian season, including Aida, Tosca, Madame Butterfly and other works, and the first England performance of Mascagni's Iris (July, with Margaret Sheridan). This appearance was under the management of Thomas Beecham, who describes him as a man of fiery and uncontrollable temper... 'never a day passed without a stormy scene with singers, chorus and orchestra, coupled with threats to return to Italy at once.' These scenes always ended in Beecham's room, and after several such experiences Beecham called his bluff by producing tickets for Mugnone and his family to return to Italy the following day. 'He opened and closed his mouth, rolled his eyes, ruffled his hair and after several abortive attempts at speech finally roared out "I will never leave you".' A long speech of justification, explanation, and declaration of fondness for England followed, and the season proceeded: life was a little quieter after that, at least for Beecham, who considered Mugnone's interpretations of Verdi the finest he ever heard.

In March 1921 he began a season at Lexington, USA, with an opera troupe headed by Iva Pacetti. From May to July 1925 he was back at Covent Garden for Aida, Andrea Chénier (with Margaret Sheridan, Giacomo Lauri-Volpi, Benvenuto Franci), Il barbiere di Siviglia (with Toti dal Monte) and Tosca (with Maria Jeritza).

== Archive and memorial ==
Around 1933 Mugnone gave to the Museums of La Scala and the Rome Opera, and to the Naples Conservatorio, about 2000 documents including letters of Verdi, Massenet, Mascagni, Strauss and Leoncavallo, and a voluminous cache of Puccini materials.

A 'Teatro Mugnone' (named in his honour) has recently been bought and should be restored in the Italian Comune of Marcianise.

== Sources ==
- A. Eaglefield-Hull, A Dictionary of Modern Music and Musicians (Dent, London 1924).
- G. Gatti-Cassazza, Memories of the Opera
- Enzo Raucci,"Vita e Opere di L. Mugnone", in Aspettando il Teatro Mugnone, Omaggio al Mo. Leopoldo Mugnone, (Unartgroup, Associazione Culturale Universitaria at www.unartgroup.it).
- Titta Ruffo, La mia parabola artistica, (Milano 1937).
- E. De Leva, "Leopoldo Mugnone nel dolore e nell’arte", Corriere di Napoli, 6 August 1941.
- A. De Angelis, "Aneddoti sit Mugnone", in La Voce d'Italia, 23 November 1941.
- Giuseppe Depanis, I Concerti Popolari ed il Teatro Regio di Torino: Quindici Anni da Vita Musicale, 1872-1886 (2 vols). (Societa Tipografico-Editrice Nazionale, Torino 1914–1915)
