= Pelléas et Mélisande discography =

Recordings of the opera by Debussy

This is a list of audio and video recordings of Pelléas et Mélisande, an opera by Claude Debussy. The premiere performance was at the Opéra-Comique in Paris on 30 April 1902.

Year	Cast (Pelléas, Mélisande, Golaud, Arkel, Yniold, Geneviève)	Conductor, Opera House and Orchestra	Label Catalogue No.
1927	Charles Panzéra, Yvonne Brothier, Vanni Marcoux, Willy Tubiana.	Piero Coppola; Grand Orchestre Symphonique du Grammophone	(Original by Victor/His Master's Voice); CD: Pearl CD; Cat: 9300; CD: Andante; Cat: ANDCD3990
1928	Alfred Maguenat, Marthe Nespoulous, Hector Dufranne, Armand Narçon, ??, Claire Croiza	Georges Truc; Orchestra de l'Opéra-Comique	(Original by Columbia Records); CD: VAI CD; Cat: VAIA 1093; CD: Andante; Cat: ANDCD3990
1934	Edward Johnson, Lucrezia Bori, Ezio Pinza, Léon Rothier, Ellen Dalossy, Ina Bourskaya	Louis Hasselmans; Metropolitan Opera orchestra and chorus	CD: EJS (live broadcast)
1942	Jacques Jansen, Irène Joachim, Henry Etchéverry, Paul Cabanel, Leila Ben Sedira, Germaine Cernay	Roger Désormière, Orchestre de la Société des Concerts du Conservatoire Paris	CD: EMI, Cat: 761 038-2; CD: Arkadia, Cat: 78018; CD: Grammofono, Cat: 2000 78727 (Studio recording)
1945	Martial Singher, Bidu Sayão, Lawrence Tibbett, Alexander Kipnis, Lillian Raimondi, Margaret Harshaw	Emil Cooper, Metropolitan Opera orchestra and chorus	CD: Walhall; Cat: WHL 27; CD: Naxos; Cat: 8.110030-1 (live broadcast)
1951	Camille Maurane, Suzanne Danco, Henry Etchéverry, André Vessières, Marjorie Westbury, Oda Slobodskaya	Désiré-Émile Inghelbrecht, Philharmonia Orchestra, BBC Singers	CD: Testament; Cat: SBT31484 (Studio broadcast)
1951	Pierre Mollet, Suzanne Danco, Heinz Rehfuß, André Vessières, Flore Wend, Hélène Bouvier	Ernest Ansermet, Chœurs et Orchestre de la Suiss Romande	CD: Decca; Cat: 425 965-2 (Studio recording)
1953	Camille Maurane, Janine Micheau, Michel Roux, Xavier Depraz, Annick Simon, Rita Gorr	Jean Fournet, Orchestre Lamoureux; Chorale Élisabeth Brasseur	CD: Philips; Cat: 434 783-2 (Studio recording)
1954	Ernst Haefliger, Elisabeth Schwarzkopf, Michel Roux, Mario Petri, Graziella Sciutti, Christiane Gayraud	Herbert von Karajan, RAI Orchestra Sinfonica and Coro di Roma	CD: Hunt; Cat: CDKAR 218
1956	Jacques Jansen, Victoria de los Ángeles, Gérard Souzay, Pierre Froumenty, Françoise Ogéas, Jeannine Collard	André Cluytens, Chœur et Orchestre National de France	CD: Testament; Cat: SBT 3051 (EMI studio recording)
1962	Jacques Jansen, Micheline Grancher, Michel Roux, André Vessières, Françoise Ogéas, Solange Michel	Désiré-Émile Inghelbrecht, Chorale Lyrique de la RTF, Orchestre National de la RTF	CD: Discque Montaigne; Cat: TCE 8710 (Studio recording)
1962	Pierre Mollet, Julien Haas, Victoria de los Ángeles, Joseph Rouleau, Ulga Chelavine, Solange Michel	Jean Fournet, Teatro Colón orchestra and chorus	CD: Ornamenti; Cat: FE 118 (live recording)
1964	Camille Maurane, Erna Spoorenberg, George London, Guus Hoekman, Rosine Brédy, Josephine Veasey	Ernest Ansermet, Gran Théâtre Chor Genf, Orchestre de la Suisse Romande	CD: Decca; Cat: SET 277-9 (Studio recording)
1969	Henri Gui, Jeannette Pilou, Gabriel Bacquier, Nicola Zaccaria, Adriana Martino, Anna Reynolds	Lorin Maazel, Coro e Orchestra Sinfonica di Roma della RAI	CD: GOP; Cat: 62; 711
1969	Éric Tappy, Erna Spoorenberg, Gérard Souzay, Victor de Narké, Anne-Marie Blanzat, Arlette Chédel	Jean-Marie Auberson, Grand Théâtre de Genève, Orchestre de la Suisse Romande, Chor des Grand Théâtre de Genève	CD: Claves; Cat: 50-2416/16
1970	George Shirley, Elisabeth Söderström, Donald McIntyre, David Ward, Anthony Britten, Yvonne Minton	Pierre Boulez, Royal Opera House orchestra and chorus	CD: CBS; Cat: 77324; CD: Sony; Cat: 47265
1971	Nicolai Gedda, Helen Donath, Dietrich Fischer-Dieskau, Peter Meven, Walter Gampert, Marga Schiml	Rafael Kubelík, Chor und Symphonieorchester des Bayerischen Rundfunks	CD: Orfeo; Cat: 367 942 (1971 live recording first released in 1994)
1978	Richard Stilwell, Frederica von Stade, José van Dam, Ruggero Raimondi, Christine Barbaux, Nadine Denize	Herbert von Karajan, Chor der Deutschen Oper Berlin, Berliner Philharmoniker (Studio recording; for details, see Pelléas et Mélisande (Herbert von Karajan recording))	CD: EMI; Cat: 749 350-2
1978	Claude Dormoy, Michèle Command, Gabriel Bacquier, Roger Soyer, Monique Pouradier-Duteil, Jocelyne Taillon,	Serge Baudo, Ensemble Vocal de Bourgogne, Orchestre de Lyon	CD: Eurodisc; Cat: 300 096-445; CD: RCA; Cat:74321 32225-2
1979	Éric Tappy, Rachel Yakar, Philippe Huttenlocher, François Loup, Colette Alliot-Lugaz, Jocelyne Taillon	Armin Jordan, Chœurs et Orchestre National de L'Opéra Monte Carlo	CD: Erato; Cat: 71296; 245 684-2 (Studio recording)
1986	Kurt Ollmann, Frederica von Stade, John Bröcheler, Nicolai Ghiaurov, Patrizia Pace, Glenys Linos	Claudio Abbado, Teatro alla Scala orchestra and chorus	CD: Opera D'Oro; Cat: OPD-1195
1987	François Le Roux, Colette Alliot-Lugaz, José van Dam, Roger Soyer, Françoise Golfier, Jocelyne Taillon,	John Eliot Gardiner, Chor & Orchester der Oper Lyon	DVD: Arthaus DVD; Cat: 100 100
1988	Malcolm Walker, Eliane Manchet, Vincent Le Texier, Peter Meven, Christian Fliegner, Carol Yahr	John Carewe, Chœurs de l'Opéra de Nice, Orchestre Philharmonique de Nice	CD: Pierre Verany; Cat: 788 093-4
1990	Didier Henry, Colette Alliot-Lugat, Gilles Cachemaille, Pierre Thau, Françoise Golfier, Claudine Carlson	Charles Dutoit, Chœurs et Orchestre Symphonique de Montréal	CD: Decca; Cat: 430 502-2 (Studio recording)
1991	François Le Roux, Maria Ewing, José van Dam, Jean-Philippe Courtis, Patricia Pace, Christa Ludwig	Claudio Abbado, Vienna State Opera; Vienna Philharmonic; Vienna State Opera Choir	CD: Deutsche Grammophon; Cat: 435 344-2 (Studio recording)
1992	Neill Archer, Alison Hagley, Donald Maxwell, Kenneth Cox, Samuel Burkey, Penelope Walker	Pierre Boulez, Welsh National Opera orchestra and chorus	DVD: Deutsche Grammophon; Cat: 072 431 3; 072 431 1
1996	Gérard Théruel, Mireille Delunsch, Armand Arapian, Gabriel Bacquier, Françoise Golfier, Hélène Jossoud	Jean-Claude Casadesus, Opéra de Lille, Orchestre National de Lille-Région; Nord-Pas-de-Calais Chorus	CD: Naxos; Cat: 8.660047-9
1998	Richard Croft, Christiane Oelze, John Tomlinson, Gwynne Howell, Jake Arditti, Jean Rigby	Andrew Davis, Glyndebourne Festival Opera; London Philharmonic Orchestra, Glyndebourne Festival Chorus	DVD: Warner Vision; Cat: 5046783262; DVD: Kultur Video
2000	Wolfgang Holzmair, Anne Sofie von Otter, Laurent Naouri, Alain Vernhes, Florence Couderc, Hanna Schaer	Bernard Haitink, Orchestre National d' Ile de France; Choeur de Radio France	CD: Naive (France); Cat: V 4923
2003	Simon Keenlyside, Lorraine Hunt Lieberson, Gerald Finley, John Tomlinson, James Danner, Nathalie Stutzmann	Bernard Haitink, Boston Symphony Orchestra, Tanglewood Festival Chorus; Concert performance, recorded on 18 October 2003	CD 2264
2004	Rodney Gilfry, Isabel Rey, Michael Volle, László Polgár, Eva Liebanu, Cornelia Kallisch	Franz Welser-Möst; Zusatzchor Opernhaus Zürich; Orchester der Oper Zürich	DVD: TDK; Cat: DVWW-OPPEM
2009	Stéphane Degout, Natalie Dessay, Laurent Naouri, Phillip Ens, Beate Ritter, Marie-Nicole Lemieux	Bertrand de Billy; ORF Radio-Symphonieorchester Wien; Arnold Schoenberg Choir	DVD: Virgin Classics; Cat: 6961379 1
2013	Jacques Imbrailo, Michaela Selinger, Vincent Le Texier, Wolfgang Schöne, Dominik Eberle, Doris Soffel	Stefan Soltesz, Essener Philharmoniker; Opernchor des Aalto-Theaters	Blu-ray: Arthaus Musik
2016	Jacques Imbrailo, Corinne Winters, Kyle Ketelsen, Brindley Sherratt, Damien Göritz, Yvonne Naef	Alain Altinoglu, Zürich Opera, Philharmonia Zurich (Producer: Dmitri Tcherniakov; recorded live in May 2016)	Blu-ray: Bel Air Classiques
2016	Marc Mauillon, Jenny Daviet, Laurent Alvaro, Stephen Bronk, Julie Mathevet, Emma Lyren	Maxime Pascal, Malmö Opera orchestra and chorus (Stage direction: Benjamin Lazar; recorded live in May)	Blu-ray: Bel Air Classiques
2017	Christian Gerhaher, Magdalena Kožená, Gerald Finley, Franz-Josef Selig, Joshua Bloom, Bernarda Fink	Simon Rattle; London Symphony Orchestra; London Symphony Chorus	CD: LSO Live
2025	Huw Montague Rendall, Sabine Devieilhe, Gordon Bintner, Jean Teitgen, (unidentified soloist), Sophie Koch	Antonello Manacorda; Paris Opera Orchestra and Chorus (Stage director: Wajdi Mouawad; recorded live, 20 April, Opéra Bastille)	HD video: medici.tv
