= Albion Rovers F.C. =

Association football team from Coatbridge, North Lanarkshire, Scotland

Albion Rovers
- Full name: Albion Rovers Football Club
- Nickname: The Wee Rovers
- Founded: 1882; 144 years ago
- Ground: Cliftonhill, Coatbridge
- Capacity: 1,572 (489 seated)
- Coordinates: 55.860236°N 4.011435°W
- Chairman: None - run by board of 5 members
- Manager: Steven Saunders
- League: Lowland League West
- 2025–26: Lowland League, 13th of 18
- Website: https://albionroversfc.com/
Home colours	Away colours	Third colours

Albion Rovers Football Club is a semi-professional football team from Coatbridge, North Lanarkshire, Scotland. They play in the Lowland League West, the fifth tier of the Scottish football league system.

Founded in October 1882, the club joined the Scottish Football League in 1903 and, other than four seasons during the First World War when the second tier was abolished, maintained their league membership until they were relegated in the 2022–23 season. During this time, they won three lower division league titles – in 1933–34, 1988–89 and 2014–15; and been promoted on three other occasions – 1937–38, 1947–48 and 2010–11.

== Ownership ==
Albion Rovers FC is a private limited company owned by its shareholders. Some half of its shares, which were first issued in 1919, have over many years become dormant, the original owners having died and the shares' inheritors becoming untraceable. The biggest single shareholder with some 7,000 shares (more than 20% of the non-dormant shares) is Anton Fagan, formerly (until January 2025) an employee of the Scottish Football Association. The Rovers Board of Directors and fans have highlighted problems with the share structure at the club and been critical of Fagan.

The next largest shareholder has around 2,000 shares (6%).

== History ==
=== Early years ===
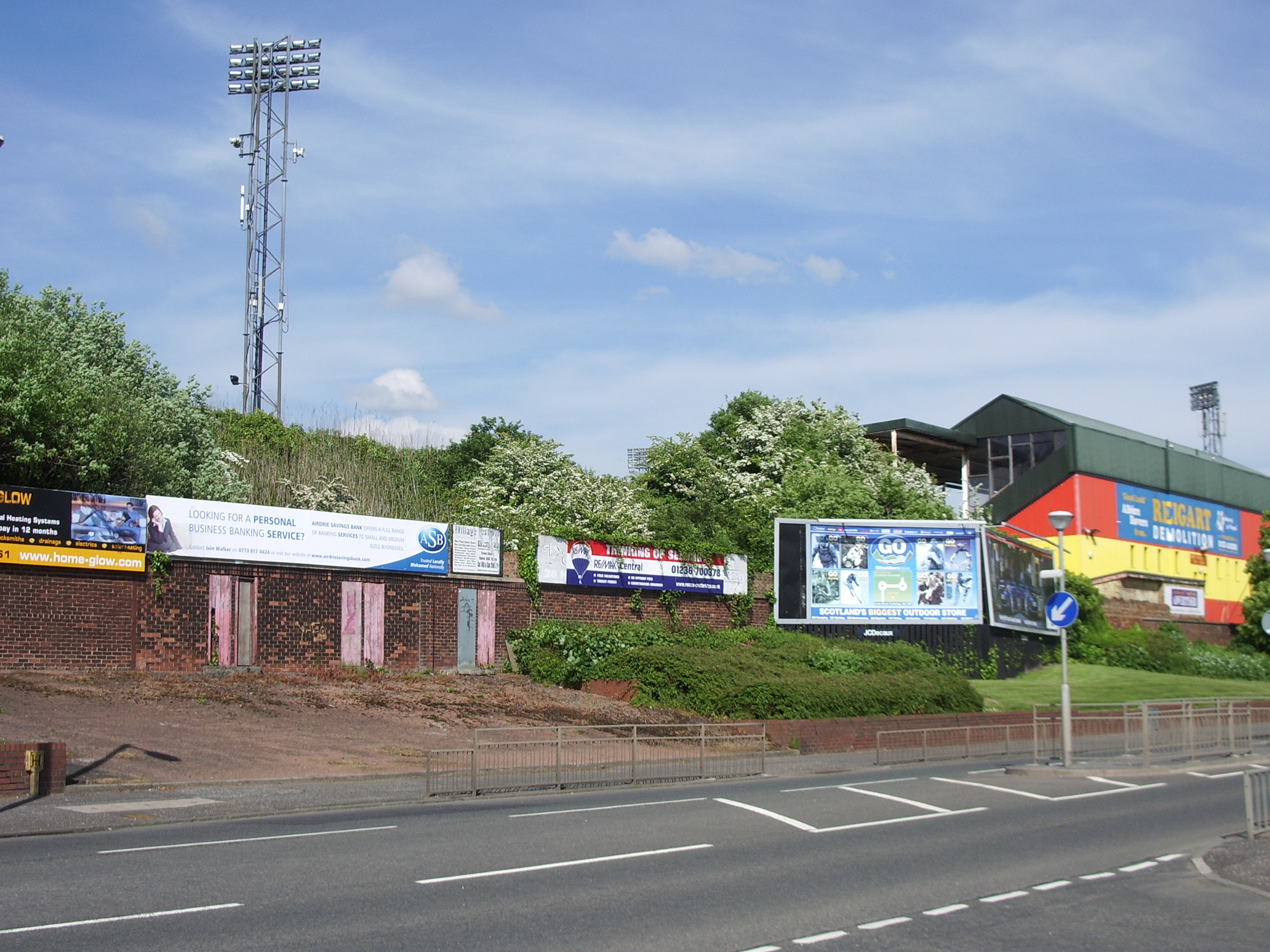
Cliftonhill, home of Albion Rovers

Albion Rovers were formed in 1882, through a merger of two Coatbridge sides Albion FC and Rovers FC, and played at Meadow Park from that year. After reaching six local cup finals in their first nine years and losing all of them, Rovers finally won a trophy in their tenth year by defeating Royal Albert 5–2 in the Larkhall Charity Cup Final, and followed this up eight days later with a 5–3 triumph over Airdrieonians in the Airdrie Charity Cup Final.

The club joined the Scottish Football League Second Division in 1903, following a small expansion in numbers. Rovers' greatest success in the pre-war era was winning the Scottish Qualifying Cup in 1913–14 by defeating Dundee Hibernian 3–0 in the Final at Tynecastle. In 1915, the League scrapped their second tier and Rovers were forced to join the Western Football League. Rovers re-joined the League after the War and moved to their current Cliftonhill home. The first match at the ground took place on 25 December 1919 v St Mirren.

=== Jimmy Conlin ===
A fast and tricky winger on the field, and a colourful character off it, Jimmy Conlin played for Rovers from 1901 to 1904, helping the club win the Scottish Combination Championship in 1901–02. He was transferred to Bradford City and played for England (the country of his birth) against Scotland at Hampden Park in 1906. He was subsequently transferred to Manchester City for £1,000, which made him the most expensive footballer in the world at the time, jointly with Alf Common.

=== 1920 Cup Final ===
Rovers finished bottom of the League in 1919–20, but enjoyed possibly their finest hour when they defeated Rangers in the semi-final of the Scottish Cup, before losing 3–2 to Kilmarnock in the Final. Local folklore has it that Rovers' goalkeeper Joe Shortt had to be bailed out of police custody on the morning of the Final and that his subsequent performance at Hampden had been affected by the lingering effects of his alcohol consumption the night before.

Rovers remained a top-flight side even after the return of the Second Division until their relegation in 1923. It was during this period that John "Jock" White became Rovers' only international, appearing for Scotland in a match against Wales. The club remained in the Second Division until the 1933–34 season when they took the title by a point from Dunfermline Athletic. Of the five seasons immediately before the Second World War Rovers spent all but one of them as a top-flight side. They took part in the Emergency Western League during the 1939–40 season before transferring to the Southern Football League. Despite struggling from time to time to get a full side out, the Rovers managed to survive the war in good shape.

=== Post-war ===
It would be 1946–47 before the League returned full-time and Rovers, whose 16th-place finish in 1939 would not normally have led to relegation, were assigned to the 'B' Division in a restructuring of the League set-up. To add to their problems the celebrated wing partnership of Willie Findlay and Johnny McIlhatton was broken up when the former departed for Rangers and the latter to Everton. One feature of the McIlhatton transfer was a friendly match between the clubs at Goodison Park in September 1946, which the Toffees won 6–3.

With Jock Stein in the line-up (Stein played 215 matches for Rovers from 1942 to 1950), Rovers managed to clinch promotion in 1947–48 if only for one season, amassing just eight points in the First Division in 1948–49 and an immediate return to the 'B' Division. This was effectively the end of the Rovers as a major force in Scottish football as they became stuck in the Second Division for many years, only occasionally challenging at the top end of the league.

=== 1960s and 1970s ===
Nevertheless, there were enough moments to brighten up the lives of the Cliftonhill faithful – such as an 8–2 League Cup defeat of local rivals Airdrieonians in 1965–66 and a run to the League Cup quarter-finals in 1973–74, again defeating Airdrie along the way. Rovers took a 2–0 lead in the first leg against Kilmarnock, but lost the 2nd leg 5–2 to go out 5–4 on aggregate.

Players from this era included midfielder Tony Green, possibly the only player to make the Hall of Fame at three clubs (Rovers, Blackpool and Newcastle United), and goalkeeper Jim Brown, who moved on to Chesterfield, and then Sheffield United – both players were capped for Scotland.

Changes brought in for the 1975–76 season saw Rovers placed in the new Second Division, which was now the third tier of the Scottish League.

=== 1980s and 1990s ===
Rovers made some headlines for reasons other than their on-field performances when, in 1983, confectioners Tunnock's became the club's shirt sponsor and the appearance of the shirt was altered to mimic the gold wrapper with red diagonal stripes of a caramel wafer bar the company produced, making Rovers one of the very few clubs to wear a kit inspired by a biscuit wrapper. In 1986, a book covering the club's history, The Boys From the "Brig" by Robin Marwick, was published.

Players such as Vic Kasule and Bernie Slaven brought some flamboyancy to Rovers in the mid-1980s, and in the 1988–89 season the club were Second Division champions. The First Division stay was again to last just one season and Rovers subsequently finished bottom of the bottom division several times during the 1990s.

=== Third Division ===
Rovers found themselves in the newly created Scottish Football League Third Division, finishing last in its inaugural season of 1994–95. In an attempt to cut costs, the number of full-timers was substantially reduced and the club's board took a decision to sell Cliftonhill and groundshare with Airdrieonians. A 'Rescue The Rovers' fan campaign mobilised shareholders to defeat the proposal and oust the Board at an Emergency General Meeting, a prescient move as it turned out given Airdrie's struggle to maintain the costs of running their new ground and subsequent liquidation.

Following another last place finish in 1999–2000, there was an attempt to change the club's fortunes. The team went full-time, although many of the full-time players were youths to whom the club gave employment under a government scheme. Rovers went into the last day of the season in 2001–02 and 2002–03 with a chance of promotion, only to miss out both times. The full-time experiment proved too expensive and had to be dismantled to keep the club's costs under control.

Another attempt by directors in 2004 to sell Cliftonhill and move to Airdrie was defeated by shareholders, despite scare stories put about by the board that the football authorities would not allow the club to play at the ground for much longer. Rovers have remained at Cliftonhill to this day and the famous old ground reached its centenary in 2019. A centenary exhibition was held at Coatbridge's Summerlee Museum to mark the occasion.

=== 125th anniversary ===
2006–07 saw the club celebrate its 125th anniversary and various events took place and souvenirs produced. A one-off kit that combined the original blue colours with the yellow adopted during the 1960s was introduced. The club also progressed to the semi-finals of the Challenge Cup, their first semi-final since 1921, a match they lost 4–1 to Ross County in Dingwall.

=== Two promotions ===
Impressive late season form in 2010–11 saw Rovers finish 2nd and go on to gain promotion, beating Queens Park in the play-off semi final and Annan Athletic in the final. In memorable scenes, hundreds of Rovers fans invaded the Annan pitch at the final whistle and joined in prolonged celebrations with the players.

The 2011–12 season, Rovers' first in a higher division in 22 seasons, had its ups and downs. A 7–2 victory over Airdrie United was the highlight for most Rovers fans but the team finished 9th in the table and found themselves in the play-offs for a second successive season – this time to stay up rather than go up. Rovers triumphed again in even more dramatic circumstances than the previous season. A Scott Chaplain last minute winner against Elgin City in the semi-final and penalties win over Stranraer in the final meant that Rovers had gone up, and stayed up, for the first time since the 1930s. Relegation came again in 2012–13 but Rovers won the 2014–15 League Two title with a 3–2 win over Clyde at Broadwood. They spent three seasons in League One before relegation back to the 4th tier after finishing bottom in 2017–18.

=== Run to Scottish Cup Quarter Final ===
In 2013–14, Rovers’ best cup run in decades saw them reach the quarter final against Rangers, having beaten local rivals top flight Motherwell 1–0 in the fourth round. After a controversial late equaliser at Ibrox, Rovers were held to a 1–1 draw but lost 2–0 in the replay.

=== League Two and Lowland League ===
Rovers struggled following relegation to League 2 in 2018, fighting to avoid the 'Club 42’ play-off position in most seasons thereafter. They made a remarkable escape under manager Kevin Harper in 2018–19 and were in 9th place (one place above the play-off drop zone) when football was suspended in March 2020 due to COVID-19. However, in season 2022–23 Rovers finished bottom of the league and faced The Spartans, losing 2–1 over two legs, and were relegated to the Lowland Football League for 2023–24.

=== Scottish record penalty shoot-out ===
On 14 October 2020, Rovers set a Scottish record for consecutive penalties scored in a shootout, beating Stranraer 15–14 in a League Cup group match. The teams between them set a record of 28 consecutive penalties scored to take the score to 14–14, before Stranraer missed their 15th kick and Rovers scored theirs.

== Honours ==
- SFL Division Two (second tier):
  - Winners 1933–34
  - Runners-up 1913–14, 1937–38, 1947–48
- SFL Second Division (third tier): Winners 1988–89
- SPFL League Two (fourth tier): Winners 2014–15
- Scottish Football League Third Division (fourth tier): Runners-up 2010–11
- Scottish Cup: Runners-up 1919–20
- Scottish Qualifying Cup: 1913–14
- Lanarkshire League: 1900–01
- Lanarkshire Cup: 1899–1900, 1920–21, 1948–49, 1950–51, 1973–74, 1974–75, 1981–82, 1986–87
- Scottish Football Combination: 1913–14
- SFL Promotion to Second Division play-offs: 2010–11; 2011–12

== Club records ==
Biggest win: 12–0 v Airdriehill (Scottish Cup, 3 September 1887)

Biggest defeat: 1–11 v Partick Thistle (Scottish League Cup, 11 August 1993)

Biggest home attendance: 27,381 v Rangers (Scottish Cup, 8 February 1936)

== Current squad ==
As of 17 October 2026

Note: Flags indicate national team as defined under FIFA eligibility rules; some limited exceptions apply. Players may hold more than one non-FIFA nationality.

No.	Pos.	Nation	Player
1	GK	SVK	Peter Urminsky (Co-operation loan from St Mirren)
2	DF	SCO	Chris Neeson (Vice-captain)
3	DF	SCO	Liam Dolan (on-loan from Partick Thistle)
4	DF	ENG	Jonathan Page
5	DF	SCO	Innes Clark (Co-operation loan from St Mirren)
6	MF	SCO	Barry Duncan (Captain)
7	MF	SCO	Conor McLaughlin
8	MF	SCO	Daniel Hunter
9	MF	SCO	Alex McCaw
10	MF	SCO	Nathan Brown

No.	Pos.	Nation	Player
11	FW	SCO	Owen Ronald
12	GK	SCO	Aaron Pollock
14	FW	SCO	Tony Garth
15	DF	SCO	Devan McColl
16	DF	SCO	Sean Docherty
18	MF	SCO	Ché Campbell
19	FW	SCO	Adam McMillan
22	DF	ENG	Rock Moses
23	MF	SCO	Leo Clark
24	FW	ITA	Alex Eguagie (on-loan from Queens Park)
26	FW	GAM	Kemo Darboe
TBC	GK	POL	Marcel Krzeminski (on-loan from Queens Park)
TBC	MF	SCO	Connor Sweeney (on-loan from Kilmarnock)
—	MF	SCO	Kai Walmsley

=== Out on loan ===
Note: Flags indicate national team as defined under FIFA eligibility rules; some limited exceptions apply. Players may hold more than one non-FIFA nationality.

No.	Pos.	Nation	Player
21	MF	SCO	Alfie Lumsden (on-loan at Whitburn)

== Club staff ==
=== Management ===
- Manager: Steven Saunders
- Assistant manager: John McGowan
- Goalkeeping coach: Jamie Strachan
- Club doctor: Dr Chris Ide
- Sports Therapist: Louise Downie
- Kit manager: Steven Sullivan

=== Board ===
- Temporary Chairman: Hugh Morrison
- Directors: John Allan, Samuel Gemmell, Leeanne Milne and Ben Kearney
- Honorary president: Lew McWilliam
- Honorary vice president: Gordon Lind
- Football Secretary: Colin Woodward
- Commercial Manager: John Gemmell

== Managers ==
- Archie Montgomery (1920–1922)
- Willie Reid (1922–1929)
- Webber Lees (1929–1935)
- John Weir (1935–1937)
- Webber Lees (1937–1949)
- Robert Beath (1950–1952)
- Tom Fagan (1952–1953)
- Jackie Hutton (1953–1961)
- Duncan McGill (1961–1962)
- Willie Telfer (1962–1965)
- Bobby Flavell (1965–1966)
- Jackie Stewart (1966–1968)
- Jimmy Harrower (1969)
- Bobby Flavell (1969–1972)
- Frank Beattie (1972–1973)
- Ralph Brand (1973–1974)
- George Caldwell (1974–1976)
- Sam Goodwin (1976–1981)
- Harry Hood (1981)
- Joe Baker (1981–1982)
- Derek Whiteford (1982)
- Martin Ferguson (1982–1983)
- Billy Wilson (1983–1984)
- Benny Rooney (1984)
- Andy Ritchie (1984)
- Joe Baker (1984–1985)
- Ray Franchetti (1985–1986)
- Tommy Gemmell (1986–1987)
- Dave Provan (1987–1991)
- Mick Oliver (1991–1992)
- Billy McLaren (1992–1993)
- Tommy Gemmell (1993–1994)
- Tom Spence (1994–1995)
- Jimmy Crease (1995)
- Vinnie Moore (1996–1998)
- Billy McLaren (1998–1999)
- Mark Shanks (1999–2000)
- John McVeigh (2000–2002)
- Peter Hetherston (2002–2003)
- Kevin McAllister (2003–2005)
- Jimmy Lindsay (caretaker) (2005)
- Jim Chapman (2005–2007)
- John McCormack (2007–2008)
- Paul Martin (2008–2012)
- Todd Lumsden (2012–2013)
- James Ward (2013–2014)
- Darren Young (2014–2017)
- Brian Kerr (2017–2018)
- John Brogan (2018)
- Kevin Harper (2018–2020)
- Brian Reid (2020–2023)
- Sandy Clark (2023–2026)
- Steven Saunders (2026-Present)

== Derivative teams ==
Albion Rovers from Newport, Wales, playing in the Gwent County League, were named after the Coatbridge side by expats. There are also clubs of the same name in Australia and the Republic of Ireland.
