= Flora Perini =

Italian mezzo-soprano

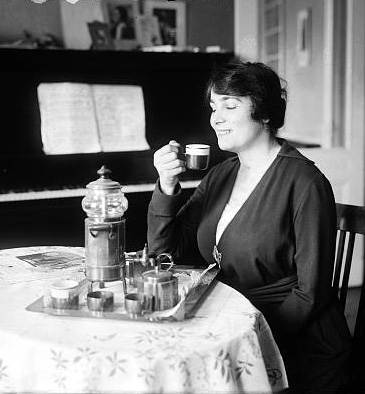
- Born: November 20, 1887; Rome, Italy
- Died: September 23, 1975 (aged 87)

Flora Perini (20 November 1887 – 23 September 1975) was an Italian operatic mezzo-soprano who had a prominent opera career in Europe, South America, and the United States during the first half of the twentieth century. She sang a wide repertoire that encompassed works by verismo composers like Puccini and Mascagni, bel canto composers like Rossini and Bellini, the Italian grand operas of Verdi, the German operas of Strauss and Wagner, and the Russian operas of Rimsky-Korsakov. She sang in numerous premieres throughout her career, including creating the role of the Princess in the original 1918 Metropolitan Opera premiere of Puccini's Suor Angelica.

== Biography ==
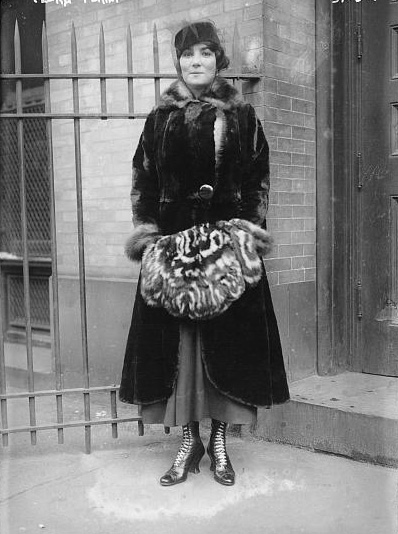
Flora Perini in 1917 at the stage entrance to the Metropolitan Opera

Perini was born in Rome on 20 November 1887. She studied at the Accademia Nazionale di Santa Cecilia before making her professional opera début at La Scala in 1908 as Anacoana in Franchetti's Cristoforo Colombo. Over the next several years she appeared in operas in Nice, Venice, Trieste, Turin, Bologna, Madrid, Barcelona, Saint Petersburg, Rio de Janeiro and Montevideo. In 1910 she sang the role of Xenia in Boris Godunov opposite Adamo Didur in the title role at the Teatro Colón in Buenos Aires. She returned to that house numerous times over the next several years singing in such roles as Herodias in Richard Strauss' Salome (1913) and Annina in Der Rosenkavalier (1915). She also sang in the world premiere of Carlos López Buchardo's El sueño de Alma in 1914.

In 1915, Perini made her American début at the Metropolitan Opera as Lola in Mascagni's Cavalleria rusticana with Margarete Matzenauer as Santuzza, Luca Botta as Turiddu, and Gaetano Bavagnoli conducting. She sang in more than 300 performances at the Met over the next nine years portraying such roles as Amneris in Aida, Enrichetta in I puritani, Hedwige in Guillaume Tell, Maddalena in Rigoletto, Mercédès in Carmen, Nancy in Martha, Rossweisse in Die Walküre, the Spring Fairy in The Snow Maiden, Suzuki in Madama Butterfly, and Teresa in La Sonnambula among other roles. Most notably she created the roles of Konchakovna in the American premiere of Prince Igor (1915), Pepa in the world premiere of Enrique Granados's Goyescas (1916), Smaragdi in the American premiere of Zandonai's Francesca da Rimini, the Princess in the world premiere of Puccini's Suor Angelica (1918), Pantasilée in the American premiere of Xavier Leroux's La reine Fiammette (1919), "Light" in the world premiere of L'oiseau bleu (1919), and Larina in the American premiere of Eugene Onegin (1920).

Perini returned to the Teatro Colón as a guest artist in 1923 to perform the role of Debora in Pizzetti's Debora e Jaele and again in 1925 to sing the "Comandante" in Zandonai's I cavalieri di Ekebù.

After nine seasons at the Met, Perini left to join the Chicago Civic Opera for a single season. She returned to Italy in 1925, where she sang principally at the Teatro Costanzi in Rome until her retirement. Her roles there included Maddalena in Rigoletto, Laura in La Gioconda, Amneris in Aida, and Fricka in Die Walküre among others.

== Recording ==
Perini can be heard singing the role of Maddalena in the famous 1917 Victor recording of the Rigoletto quartet with Enrico Caruso, Amelita Galli-Curci and Giuseppe De Luca. This was apparently the only recording she ever made.

== Sources ==
- Cori Ellison: "Flora Perini", Grove Music Online ed. L. Macy (Accessed November 17, 2008), (subscription access)
- Biography of Flora Perini from Operissimo.com (In German)
- Riemens, Leo (1969). A concise biographical dictionary of singers; from the beginning of recorded sound to the present. Chilton Book Co.
