= Paolo Serrao =

Italian composer

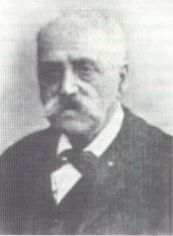
Paolo Serrao

Paolo Serrao (11 April 1830 – 17 March 1907) was a distinguished and influential Italian teacher of musical theory and composition at Naples.

Serrao was born in Filadelfia, Calabria. He studied at the Naples Conservatory (then called the Real Collegio di Musica). He studied composition and counterpoint under Carlo Conti, piano with Francesco Lanza (a student of Clementi) and received instruction in harmony from Gennaro Parisi. His most significant teacher and mentor was Saverio Mercadante where their relationship lasted nearly 30 years and became almost filial.

As professor of composition at the San Pietro a Maiella Conservatorio at Naples, over many years, he taught many famous Italian musicians, notably Giuseppe Martucci, Umberto Giordano, Leopoldo Mugnone, Michele Esposito, Francesco Cilea, Franco Alfano, Luigi Denza and Alessandro Longo.

He wrote five operas, of which Pergolesi was the most successful. His other compositions include both concert and sacred music. He died in Naples, aged 76.

== Selected works ==
Opera

- L'impostore, Opera semiseria (1850)
- Leonora dei Bardi, Opera seria (1853)
- Pergolesi, Melodramma semiserio in 3 acts (1857); libretto by Federico Quercia
- La Duchessa di Guisa, Melodramma in 4 acts (1865); libretto by Francesco Maria Piave
- Il Figliuol Prodigo, Opera in 4 acts (1868); libretto by Achille de Lauzières

Orchestral

- Sinfonia

Chamber music

- Andante e Fuga for string quartet
- Elegia for violin (or cello) and piano
- Minuetto for harp or piano

Choral

- Requiem for mixed chorus and orchestra
- Gli Ortonesi in Sciò, Oratorio

== Sources ==
- Arthur Eaglefield Hull, A Dictionary of Modern Music and Musicians (Dent, London 1924).
