= Désiré-Émile Inghelbrecht =

French conductor and composer

Désiré-Émile Inghelbrecht (17 September 1880 – 14 February 1965) was a French composer, conductor and writer.

== Life and career ==
Inghelbrecht was born in Paris, the son of a violist. He studied at the Paris Conservatoire and made his debut as a conductor in 1908 at the Théâtre des Arts.

Inghelbrecht entered the Conservatoire at only age seven and studied solfege, harmony and violin. When 16, he was expelled when caught playing violin in local cafes. But soon afterward, he was appointed second violin in the Concerts de l'Opéra orchestra; his friend Pierre Monteux, then conductor of the Concerts Berlioz, would also use him as a substitute – all of which gave him important experience.

In 1908 he conducted the first performance of Florent Schmitt's La tragédie de Salomé which was a success and led to more engagements with leading musicians, including chorus master for the first performance of Claude Debussy's Le martyre de Saint Sébastien. In 1913 he was appointed as director of the new Théâtre des Champs-Élysées, inaugurated on 2 April. In 1919 Inghelbrecht conducted the first performance of André Caplet's arrangement of Debussy's La boîte à joujoux; he also founded the Concerts Pleyel devoted to music of the 16th to 18th centuries. In 1921 he conducted the premiere of Les mariés de la tour Eiffel, a ballet by five of the members of Les Six.

Inghelbrecht was music director of the Opéra-Comique in 1924–25, where he conducted Massenet's Manon, a new production of Wagner's Tristan und Isolde, Debussy's Pelléas et Mélisande, and Fauré's Masques et bergamasques and Pénélope; he also conducted several ballets including the premiere of his own Jeux de Couleurs. From 1928 to 1932 conducted the Concerts Pasdeloup, and briefly directed the Opera d'Alger in 1929.

In 1934, Inghelbrecht was asked to form a national radio orchestra – to become the Orchestre National de la Radiodiffusion Française (ONF). The following year, he fulfilled a long-held ambition to conduct the first Paris performance of the 1874 edition of Musorgsky's Boris Godunov.

During World War II, the ONF was evacuated to Rennes, then Marseilles before its return to Paris in 1943. But when planning the 1,000th performance of the orchestra (which was also to commemorate the 25th anniversary of Debussy's death), Inghelbrecht refused to conduct a program devoted to music of the occupying German forces and on 18 July 1943 received a note suspending his appointment by order of President Laval.

From 1945 to 1950 Inghelbrecht was conductor of the Paris Opéra, and returned to the ONF in 1947. From 1958 to his death in 1965, he prepared weekly radio programs called 'Entretiens autour d'un piano'.

Both in conducting and writing he championed Debussy, Ravel, Roussel, Chabrier and Florent Schmitt.

He corresponded with Debussy – a close friend – from 1911 until the latter's death in 1918. He was a member of Les Apaches along with Ravel, Schmitt and others.

He was married three times: to Colette Steinlen (1910, divorced in 1920), Carina Ari (1928) and Germaine Perrin, with whom he wrote a biography of Debussy in 1953.

== Compositions ==
Although self-taught as a composer, Inghelbrecht left around 60 compositions. The style of his compositions is eclectic. Even when stylistically unoriginal, his polished, masterly orchestration makes his work worthy of closer attention. The operetta Leïla (or Virage sur l’aile) of 1947, is a hilarious comedy and eminently singable entertainment. The opera-ballet Le chêne et le tilleul (after La Fontaine) of 1960 is the climax of the composer's output with harmonies in the style of Debussy contrasting with the Bacchic frenzy of wild dances with pungently rhythmic, virile accompaniment. La Nursery for piano four-hands consists of 36 short pieces composed between 1905 and 1932 and some later orchestrated.

=== Stage ===
- La nuit vénitienne (comédie musicale, after Musset)
- Le diable dans le beffroi (ballet)
- Rayon de lune (ballet)
- Virage sur l'aile (opérette in three acts).

=== Orchestra ===
- Automne
- Pour le jour de la première neige au Japon
- Rapsodie de Printemps
- El Greco
- Trois poèmes dansés
- La métamorphose d'Eve
- Six danses suédoises
- Sinfonia brève
- Légende de Saint Nicolas
- La valse retrouvée
- Le livre d'or
- Ibériana for violin and orchestra
- Ballade dans le Goût Irlandais for harp and orchestra.

=== Chamber ===
- Prélude et Saltarelle for viola and piano (1907)
- Impromptu in F minor for viola and piano (1922)
- Nocturne for cello (or violin, or viola) and piano (1922)
- Quintet in C minor
- Sonatine for flute and harp

=== Choral ===
- Requiem
- Tant que Noël durera
- Pastourelles sur des Noëls anciens
- Mongli

== Writings ==
- Comment on ne doit pas interpréter Carmen, Faust et Pelléas – 1923
- Diabolus in musica : Essais sur la musique et ses interprètes – 1933
- Mouvement contraire : souvenirs d’un musicien – 1947
- Le Chef d’orchestre et son équipe – 1949
- Le Chef d’orchestre parle au public – 1957

== Discography ==
- Debussy : Pelléas et Mélisande, Le martyre de Saint Sébastien, La Damoiselle élue DTL 93009, Marche écossaise, Prélude à l'après-midi d'un faune, La Mer, Jeux, Images
- Ravel : Daphnis et Chloé, Ma mère l'Oye, Une barque sur l'océan
- Berlioz : Overture Le Carnaval Romain, excerpts from La Damnation de Faust
- Fauré : Shylock, Pelléas et Mélisande, Cantique de Jean Racine, Requiem
- Bizet : Carmen
