= Strakosch =

Strakosch is a surname. Notable people with the surname include:

- Henry Strakosch (1871–1943), Austrian-born British banker and businessman
- Ludwig Strakosch (1855–1919), Austrian operatic baritone
- Maurice Strakosch (1825–1887), American musician and impresario of Czech origin
