= Michael Oliver (footballer, born 1957) =

Scottish footballer and manager

Personal information
- Date of birth: 16 November 1957 (age 68)
- Place of birth: Kirkintilloch, Scotland
- Position: Defender

Youth career
- Campsie Black Watch

Senior career*
Years	Team	Apps	(Gls)
1978–1983	Falkirk	79	(6)
1983–1984	Cowdenbeath	39	(4)
1984–1985	Queen of the South	42	(2)
1985–1986	Stenhousemuir	2	(0)
1986	Albion Rovers	2	(0)
1986	Stranraer	1	(0)
1986–1987	East Stirlingshire	5	(0)
1987–1988	Queen of the South	4	(0)
1988–1990	Albion Rovers	61	(3)
1990–1991	Arbroath	13	(0)

Managerial career
- 1991–1992: Albion Rovers
- * Club domestic league appearances and goals

Michael Oliver (born 16 November 1957) is a Scottish former professional football player and manager.

== Career ==
Oliver had successful spells at QOS and Albion Rovers, winning the Division 2 championship. After retiring as a player, Oliver was appointed manager of Albion Rovers in 1991. He also worked as assistant manager to Gordon Dalziel at Ayr United, where he was building a growing reputation as a coach and especially in developing young players. Oliver then moved to be general manager at Clydebank.

Since leaving the latter of those positions, Oliver has built up a great reputation in the area of player identification and has worked as a scout for Dundee United, Wigan Athletic and Birmingham City. Oliver was hired by the Scottish Football Association after Craig Levein was appointed as national team manager. Levein explained at the time of Oliver's appointment that he wanted to inform his players about all of their opponents, which necessitated the hiring of a full-time scout.
