= Virgil Franchetti =

Scottish footballer

Personal information
- Full name: Virgil Peter Franchetti
- Date of birth: 6 March 1954 (age 72)
- Place of birth: Shettleston, Scotland
- Position: Forward

Youth career
- St Mungo's Academy

Senior career*
| Years | Team | Apps | (Gls) |
| 1972–1973 | Queen's Park | 19 | (5) |
| 1973–1974 | Clyde | 3 | (1) |

International career
| 1973 | Scotland Amateurs | 4 | (0) |
- * Club domestic league appearances and goals

Virgil Peter Franchetti (6 March 1954) is a Scottish retired amateur football forward who played in the Scottish League for Queen's Park and Clyde. He was capped by Scotland at amateur level.

== Personal life ==
Franchetti's brother Ray also became a footballer.
