= Suor Angelica =

1918 opera by Giacomo Puccini

- One-act opera, part of Il trittico by Giacomo Puccini
- Librettist: Giovacchino Forzano
- Language: Italian
- Premiere: 14 December 1918; Metropolitan Opera

Suor Angelica (Sister Angelica) is an opera in one act by Giacomo Puccini to an original Italian libretto by Giovacchino Forzano. It is the second opera of the trio of operas known as Il trittico (The Triptych). It received its world premiere at the Metropolitan Opera on December 14, 1918. A rarity, its main cast features only women.

== Roles ==
Roles, voice types, premiere cast
Role	Voice type	Premiere cast, 14 December 1918 Conductor: Roberto Moranzoni
Sister Angelica	soprano	Geraldine Farrar
The Princess, her aunt	contralto	Flora Perini
The Abbess	mezzo-soprano	Rita Fornia
The Monitress	mezzo-soprano	Marie Sundelius
The Mistress of the novices	mezzo-soprano	Cecil Arden
Sister Genovieffa	soprano	Mary Ellis
Sister Osmina	soprano	Margarete Belleri
Sister Dolcina	soprano	Marie Mattfeld
The nursing sister	mezzo-soprano	Leonora Sparkes
The alms sisters	sopranos	Kitty Beale and Minnie Egener
A novice	soprano	Phillis White
The lay sisters	soprano and mezzo-soprano	Marie Tiffany and Veni Warwick
Offstage chorus of women, children, and men

== Synopsis ==
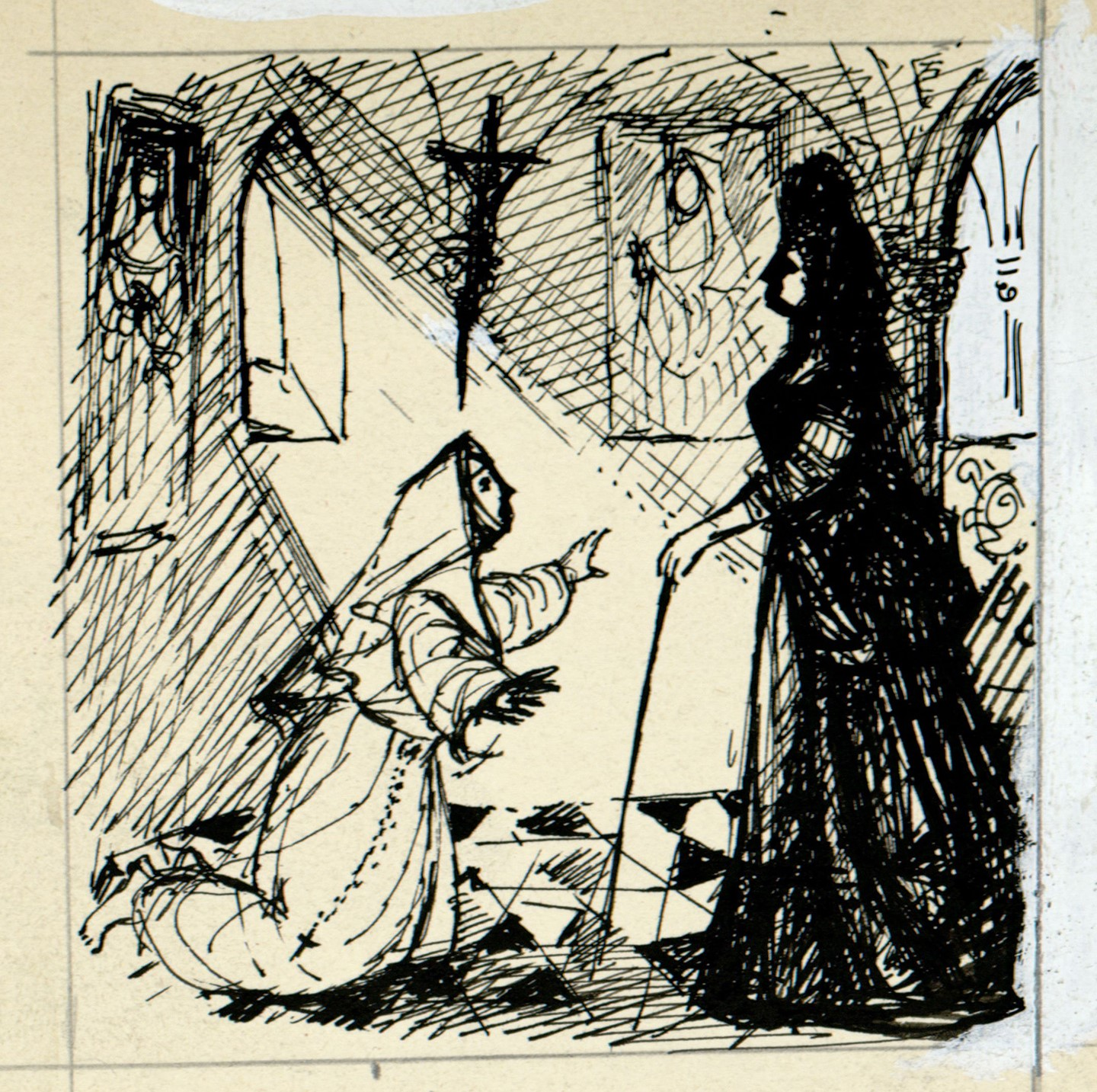
Drawing for Suor Angelica

Place: A convent in Italy
Time: The latter part of the 17th century

The opera opens with scenes showing typical aspects of life in the convent. Sister Angelica and two lay sisters - Sister Genovieffa and Sister Dolcina - are late for chapel. All the sisters sing hymns, the Monitor chides Sisters Genovieffa and Dolcina for not doing penance as Sister Angelica has done, and everyone gathers for recreation in the courtyard. The sisters rejoice because, as the mistress of novices explains, this is the first of three evenings that occur each year when the setting sun strikes the fountain so as to turn its water golden. This event causes the sisters to remember Bianca Rosa, a sister who has died. Sister Genovieffa suggests they pour some of the "golden" water onto her tomb.

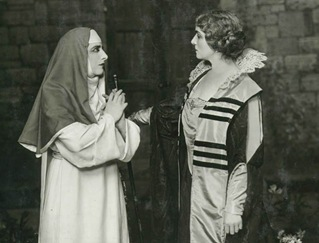
Geraldine Farrar as Suor Angelica and Flora Perini as the Princess in the 1918 premiere

The nuns discuss their desires for worldly pleasures. While the Monitor believes that any desire at all is wrong, Sister Genovieffa confesses that she longs for the lambs she tended to when she was a shepherdess, and Sister Dolcina for sweet foods to eat. Sister Angelica claims to have no desires, but as soon as she says so, the nuns begin gossiping – Sister Angelica has lied, because her true desire is to hear from her wealthy noble family, whom she has not heard from in seven years. Rumors are that she was sent to the convent as punishment.

The conversation is interrupted by the Infirmary Sister, who begs Sister Angelica to make a herbal remedy, her specialty, for a wasp sting. Two tourières arrive, bringing supplies to the convent, and news that a grand coach is waiting outside. Sister Angelica becomes nervous and upset, thinking rightly that someone in her family has come to visit her. The Abbess chastises Sister Angelica for her inappropriate excitement and announces the visitor, the Princess, Sister Angelica's aunt.

The Princess rejects Sister Angelica's affectionate gestures. The Princess explains that 20 years prior, she became the guardian to Angelica and her sister Anna Viola when their parents died and that she was given control over her nieces' inheritance. The Princess then reveals her reason for coming to the convent – Angelica must sign a document transferring her inheritance to Anna Viola, who is marrying a man willing to ignore the shame that his fiancée's sister brought on their family. Angelica replies that she has repented of her sin but that she cannot sacrifice everything to the Virgin: she cannot forget the memories of her illegitimate son, who was taken from her seven years previously and of her aunt's banishing her to the convent as retribution. The Princess at first refuses to respond, but she finally informs Sister Angelica that her son died of fever two years prior. Sister Angelica, devastated, signs the document transferring her inheritance and then collapses in tears. The Princess leaves.

Sister Angelica is seized by a heavenly vision – she believes she hears her son calling for her to meet him in paradise. She makes a poison and drinks it but realizes that by killing herself she has committed a mortal sin and has damned herself to eternal separation from her son. She begs the Virgin Mary for mercy and, as she dies, she witnesses a miracle: the Virgin Mary appears along with Sister Angelica's son, who runs to embrace her.

== Recordings ==
Year	Cast (Suor Angelica, The Princess, The Abbess, The Monitress, Sister Genovieffa)	Conductor, opera house and orchestra	Label
1957	Victoria de los Ángeles, Fedora Barbieri, Mina Doro, Mina Doro, Lidia Marimpietri	Tullio Serafin, Orchestra and Chorus of the Rome Opera	LP: HMV; Cat: ALP 1577 (reissued by EMI on CD in 1992)
1962	Renata Tebaldi, Giulietta Simionato, Lucia Danieli, Miti Trucato Pace, Dora Carral	Lamberto Gardelli, Orchestra e coro del Maggio Musicale Fiorentino	CD: DECCA; Cat: 411 665-2
1973	Katia Ricciarelli, Fiorenza Cossotto	Bruno Bartoletti, Accademia di Santa Cecilia Orchestra and Chorus	CD: RCA Red Seal; 88697341022
1975	Renata Scotto, Marilyn Horne, Patricia Payne, Gillian Knight, Ileana Cotrubaș	Lorin Maazel, New Philharmonia Orchestra	CD: Sony Classical; Cat: 88697527292
1978	Joan Sutherland, Christa Ludwig, Anne Collins, Elizabeth Connell, Isobel Buchanan	Richard Bonynge, National Philharmonic Orchestra	CD: Decca; Cat: 458218
1981	Renata Scotto, Jocelyne Taillon, Jean Kraft, Gwynn Cornell, Betsy Norden	James Levine, Metropolitan Opera Orchestra & Chorus (Production: Fabrizio Melano; recorded live, 14 November 1981)	Streaming video: Met Opera on Demand
1983	Rosalind Plowright, Dunja Vejzović, Maria Grazia Allegri	Gianandrea Gavazzeni, Orchestra di La Scala, Milan; Director: Brian Large	DVD: NVC; Cat: 810903706
1987	Lucia Popp, Marjana Lipovšek, Marga Schiml	Giuseppe Patanè, Munich Radio Orchestra	CD: Eurodisc; Cat: 7806
1994	Mirella Freni, Elena Souliotis, Gloria Scalchi, Ewa Podleś, Barbara Frittoli	Bruno Bartoletti, Orchestra e coro del Maggio Musicale Fiorentino	CD: DECCA; Cat: 436 261-2

== Noted arias ==
- "Senza mamma" – Suor Angelica
- "Nel silenzio" – The Princess
