= Marga Schiml =

German opera singer (born 1945)

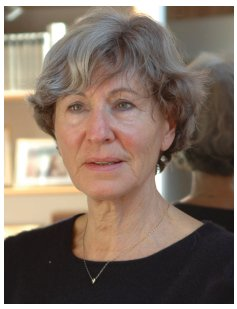
- Schiml in 2012
- Born: 29 November 1945 (age 80); Weiden in der Oberpfalz, Upper Palatinate, Bavaria, Germany
- Education: Musikhochschule München
- Occupations: Mezzo-soprano; Academic teacher
- Organizations: Hochschule für Musik Karlsruhe
- Awards: Order of Merit of Germany
- Website: www.margaschiml.de

Marga Schiml (born 29 November 1945) is a German opera singer who sings mezzo-soprano and alto. She has appeared at major European opera houses and festivals, such as the Vienna State Opera, the Deutsche Oper Berlin, the Hamburg State Opera and La Scala, at the Salzburg Festival and the Bayreuth Festival. She was also an academic voice teacher at the Hochschule für Musik Karlsruhe from 1987 to 2011.

== Career ==
Born in Weiden in Upper Palatinate, Schiml studied at the Musikhochschule München with Hanno Blaschke. She received a scholarship from Deutsche Grammophon.

At the Salzburg Festival, she appeared in 1970 as Erste Dame in Mozart's Die Zauberflöte, in 1972 as Cherubino in Le nozze di Figaro, conducted by Herbert von Karajan, and in 1984 and 1985 in scenic performances of Bach's St Matthew Passion.

At the Bayreuth Festival, she performed several roles in the centenary production Jahrhundertring of Wagner's Der Ring des Nibelungen, directed by Patrice Chéreau and conducted by Pierre Boulez. She performed first in 1978 the role of the Rhinemaiden Floßhilde in Das Rheingold and Götterdämmerung, and from 1979 the valkyrie Siegrune in Die Walküre. She appears in the three roles on the DVD of the production. From 1979, she appeared as a flower maiden in Parsifal, from 1981 as Magdalene in Die Meistersinger von Nürnberg, and from 1998 as Mary in Der fliegende Holländer.

Schiml appeared at La Scala as Dorabella in Mozart's Cosi fan tutte, conducted by Karl Böhm. She appeared as Fricka in Wagner's Ring cycle at the Teatro Regio in Turin in 1986, and Annina in Der Rosenkavalier by Richard Strauss at the Maggio Musicale Fiorentino in 1989. She portrayed Olga in Tchaikovsky's Eugene Onegin at the Bonn Opera, as Magdalene in Die Meistersinger von Nürnberg also in Bonn, Hamburg and Barcelona. She appeared in Debussy's Pelléas et Mélisande conducted by Rafael Kubelik, and in Mozart's Le nozze di Figaro and Die Zauberflöte, conducted by Ferdinand Leitner and Wolfgang Sawallisch.

In concert, she sang in Beethoven's Ninth Symphony, conducted by Karajan, and the Missa Solemnis, conducted by Sawallisch. She performed Bach's Christmas Oratorio and Mass in B minor, conducted by Karl Richter. She sang in Mahler's Eighth Symphony with both Seiji Ozawa and Gustav Kuhn, and in Mendelssohn's Elias with Otmar Suitner. She was a soloist in the ballet version of Bach's St Matthew Passion by John Neumeier in 1981, along with Peter Schreier as the Evangelist, Bernd Weikl as the vox Christi, Mitsuko Shirai and Franz Grundheber, conducted by Günter Jena. In a concert with explanations (Gesprächskonzert) in Frankfurt's Alte Oper on 24 January 1988, she performed Bach's cantata Wachet! Betet! Betet! Wachet! BWV 70, and Johann Christian Bach's Dies irae with Helmuth Rilling and the Gächinger Kantorei.

Schiml was a professor of voice at the Hochschule für Musik Karlsruhe from 1987. She retired in 2011, but still trains young singers. Among her students was Maria Radner. In 1999 she was awarded the Order of Merit of Germany.

== Selected recordings ==
Schiml recorded masses by Mozart, masses by Carl Maria von Weber, and masses by Bruckner with Eugen Jochum. In opera, she performed in Puccini's Suor Angelica with Lucia Popp in the title role), conducted by Giuseppe Patané, for example. She also appeared in radio and TV productions.

- Debussy: Geneviève in Pelléas et Mélisande, with Rafael Kubelík conducting choir and orchestra of the Bayerischer Rundfunk, Nicolai Gedda and Helen Donath in the title roles, and Dietrich Fischer-Dieskau as Golaud, 1971
- Weber: Puck in Oberon, conducted by Rafael Kubelik, 1971, re-issued 2006
- Cornelius: Der Barbier von Bagdad, conducted by Ferdinand Leitner, with Helen Donath, 1974
- Mozart: Annio in La clemenza di Tito, with Karl Böhm conducting the Staatskapelle Dresden, Peter Schreier in the title role, Júlia Várady as Vitellia, Teresa Berganza as Sesto, Edith Mathis as Servilia and Theo Adam as Publio
- Wagner: Der Ring des Nibelungen, 1980
- Beethoven: Die Symphonien, Symphony No. 9, with Helena Döse, Peter Schreier, Theo Adam, Staatskapelle Dresden, conducted by Herbert Blomstedt, 1980
- Bach: St Matthew Passion, 1981
- Bach: Weihnachtsoratorium, Part I–III, 1984
- Wagner: Mary in Der fliegende Holländer, 1992
- Schumann: Das Paradies und die Peri, 1997
- Handel: Salomo, 1986, re-issued 2009
