= Delia Reinhardt (soprano) =

German operatic soprano (1892–1974)

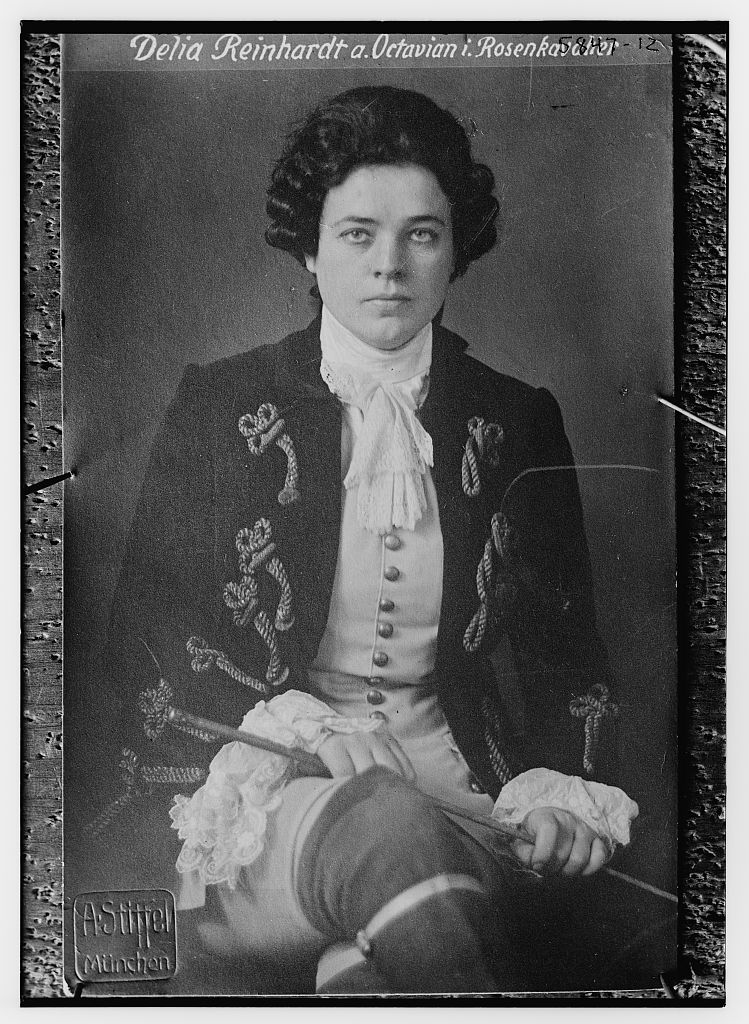
- Delia Reinhardt in costume, in about 1923
- Born: 27 April 1892; Elberfeld, Germany
- Died: 6 October 1974 (aged 82); Arlesheim, Switzerland
- Occupation: Soprano singer

Delia Reinhardt (27 April 1892 – 6 October 1974) was a German operatic soprano.

== Early life and education ==
Born in Elberfeld, Reinhardt was a student of Ludwig Strakosch and his wife Hedwig Schako at the Hoch Conservatory in Frankfurt.

== Career ==
She made her debut in Breslau in 1913 as a "messenger of peace" in Rienzi and stayed there until 1916. From 1916 to 1922/1923 she was at the Bavarian State Opera at the invitation of Bruno Walter. From 1922/1923 she was then at the Metropolitan Opera in New York. There, she made her debut as "Sieglinde" in the Walküre and appeared in a total of ten great roles, among others as "Elisabeth" in Tannhäuser, as "Agathe", as "Butterfly", as "Fiordiligi" and as "Sitâ" in Massenet's Le roi de Lahore. She also sang the part of Elsa in Lohengrin with the Metropolitan Opera at the Philadelphia Academy of Music in 1923. "Mme. Reinhardt, who has the advantage of a pleasing presence, is endowed with a beautiful soprano voice, which she uses with taste and skill and feeling," commented The Philadelphia Inquirer review of that performance, adding "she is also an extremely capable actress."

Returning to Europe, she was a member of the ensemble of the Berlin State Opera from 1924 to 1935. In 1929, she was the "Pamina" in The Magic Flute in the opening performance of the Staatsoper, which was reopened after a renovation, in the presence of the Reich President Paul von Hindenburg.

Guest performances took her to the London Covent Garden (1924–29), to the opera houses of Copenhagen, Budapest, Amsterdam and Brussels, to Italian and Spanish theatres, to the Städtische Oper Berlin. In 1931 she had a guest performance at the Teatro Colón in Buenos Aires in Wagner roles. For political reasons she could not perform in Germany after 1937. She lived in Berlin until the end of the Second World War, but lost her entire house there in a bombing raid and then went to Bavaria.

Bruno Walter invited her to move her residence to Santa Monica. She sang at the Wilshire Ebell Theatre in Los Angeles in 1949, assisted by Walter. In 1950, she and Walter presented works by Mahler, Handel, Schubert and Wagner in Ojai. After Walter's death in 1962, she moved to Dornach in Switzerland. After she had ended her career as a singer, she worked as an artist.

== Personal life ==
Reinhardt was first married to the baritone Gustav Schützendorf (1883–1937). Her second husband was conductor Georges Sébastian. Reinhardt died in Arlesheim near Basel at the age of 82.

== Literature ==
- K. J. Kutsch, Leo Riemens: Großes Sängerlexikon. Unchanged edition. K. G. Saur, Bern, 1993, second volume M–Z, p. 243;f., ISBN 3-907820-70-3.
