= Ida Rubinstein =

Russian dancer and actress (1883–1960)

Ida Rubinstein L.d'H. GC
- Ида Рубинштейн
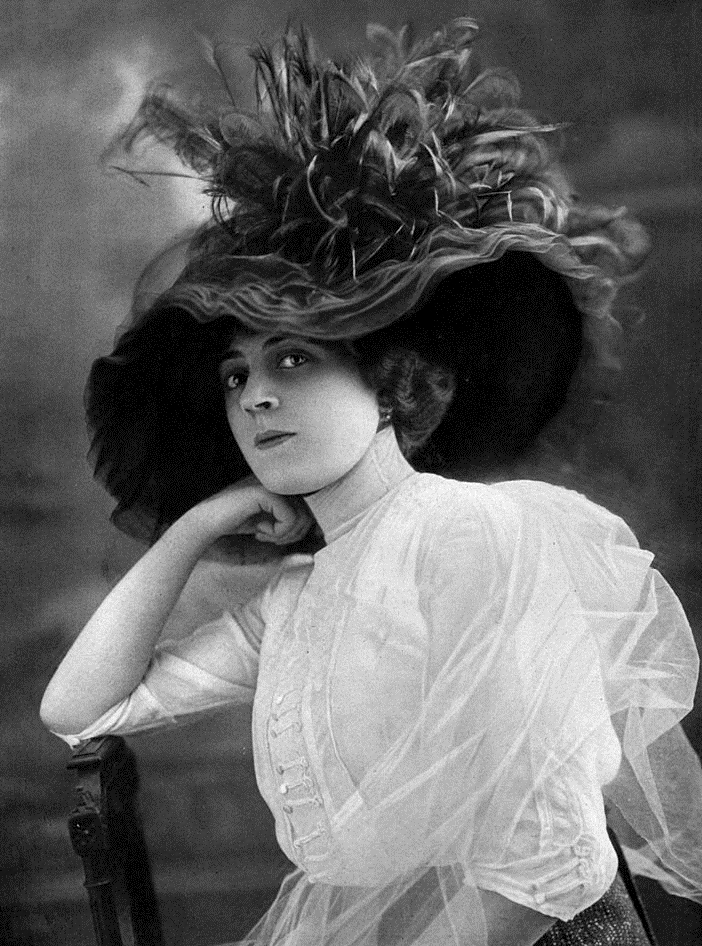
- Rubinstein in 1912
- Born: Ida Lvovna Rubinstein; 3 October 1883; Kharkov, Russian Empire
- Died: 20 September 1960 (aged 76); Vence, France
- Occupations: Dancer; actress
- Years active: 1908–1939

Ida Lvovna Rubinstein (Russian: Ида Львовна Рубинштейн; 3 October [O.S. 21 September] 1883 – 20 September 1960) was a Russian dancer, actress, art patron and Belle Époque figure. She performed with Sergei Diaghilev's Ballets Russes from 1909 to 1911 and later formed her own company. Boléro by Ravel (1928) was among her commissions.

== Biography ==
=== Early life and family ===
Rubinstein was born into one of Russian Empire's richest families, to Jewish parents in Kharkov (now in Ukraine), and grew up in Saint Petersburg. For many years, it was a mystery whether she was born in Kharkov or Saint Petersburg, complicated by the rumour that "Ida" was short for "Adelaida". Rubinstein herself would not confirm where she was born, nor if Ida was a nickname, preferring the aura of mystery. Years after her death, the record was discovered in the archives of the Kharkov Choral Synagogue, where her father had been a board member: the birth of a daughter, Ida Lvovna, on 21 September (O.S., N.S. 5 October), to father Lev Ruvimovich, Honorary Citizen of Kharkov, and mother Ernestina Isaakovna Rubinstein, had been dutily recorded in the registry for 1883. She had an older sister, Rachel, born in 1876.

Ida's grandfather, Ruvim (Roman) Rubinstein, had been a successful sugar trader in Kharkov. He moved to Saint Petersburg, where he founded the company Roman Rubinstein & Sons with his two sons, Lev (Leon) and Adolf (Anton). The family multiplied their investment many times over, becoming millionaires by the time Ida was born. The family expanded to own several banks, including the First Bank of Kharkov, sugar mills and breweries.

The family donated large sums of money to charities, particularly the arts. Lev and Adolf were both well educated; they regularly hosted prominent intellectuals and artists in their home. Adolf's son Iosif became a successful pianist who studied under Franz Liszt.

Her mother died when Ida was very young, and in 1892, her father died in Frankfurt, leaving her a vast fortune. In 1893, the eight-year-old Ida was sent to Saint Petersburg to live with her aunt, socialite "Madame" Gorvits (Horwitz). Rubinstein grew up in her aunt's mansion on the city's famed Promenade des Anglais, where she was given the best education. She became fluent in English, French, German and Italian. When she became interested in Ancient Greece, a Greek professor was invited to tutor her in Saint Petersburg.

She was also given the best instruction in music, dance and theatre, including lessons from instructors from the Russian imperial theatres. She lacked natural dance ability, but she worked constantly on her posture, movements and pirouettes. Eventually, secretly intent on going on stage herself, she went to Paris, France, under the guise of continuing her education.

=== Professional years ===
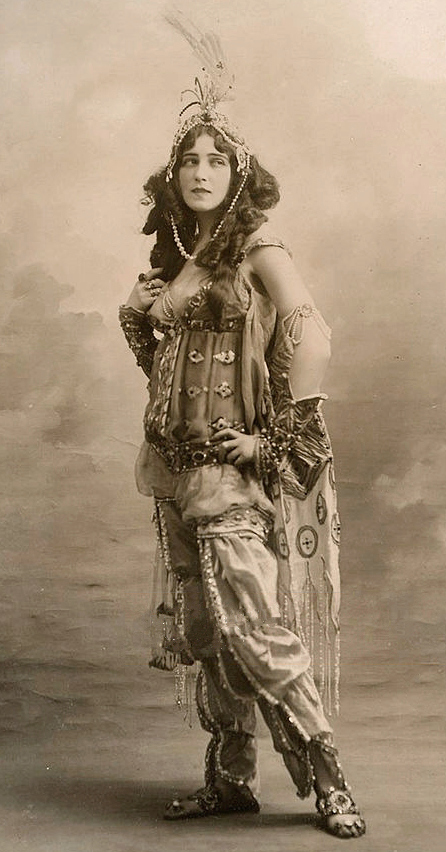
Rubinstein in Scheherazade, 1910

In Paris, Rubinstein began her career as an actress, appearing on stage in various stages of "indecent" garb. The news reached Saint Petersburg and the ears of her conservative Orthodox family. While it was perfectly respectable for the upper class to be seen at the theatre, being an actress was no different from being a prostitute in the eyes of her horrified relatives. Her brother-in-law, a Parisian doctor named Lewinsohn (Levinson), had her declared legally insane in order to commit her to a mental asylum to save the family's honor.

Her family in Kharkov and Saint Petersburg, unhappy with her being in an asylum, demanded she be released and sent home. Once in Saint Petersburg, she was chaperoned at all times by her governess, as was customary for an unmarried young woman of her social class. To earn her freedom and right to control her fortune, she married her first cousin Vladimir Gorvits, who was madly in love with her and allowed her to travel and perform.

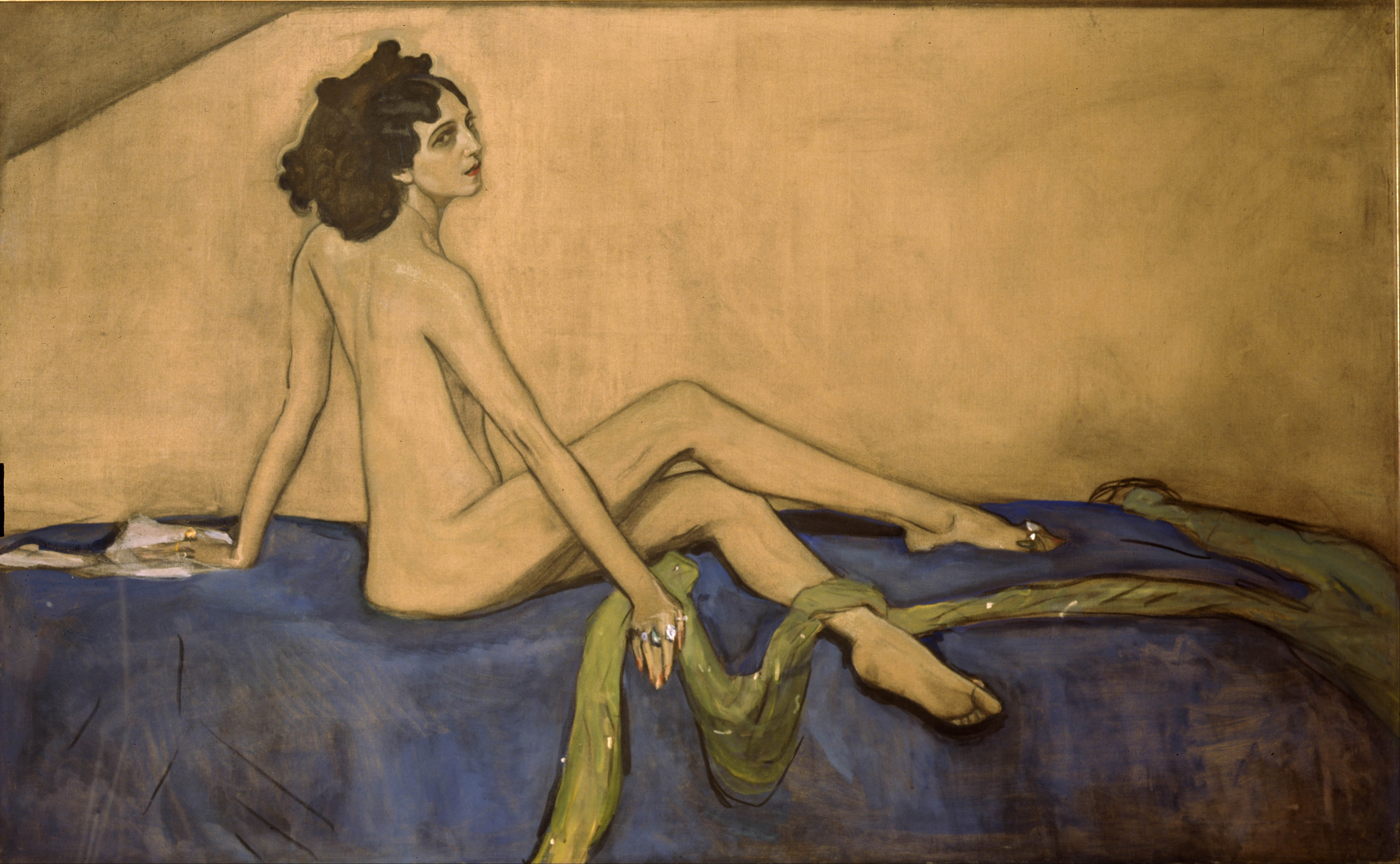
Valentin Serov, portrait of Ida as Salomé, 1910.

She had, by the standard of Russian ballet, little formal training. Tutored by Mikhail Fokine, she made her debut in 1908. This was a single private performance of Oscar Wilde's Salomé, in which she stripped nude in the course of the Dance of the Seven Veils.

Sergei Diaghilev took her with the Ballets Russes and she danced the title role of Cléopâtre in the Paris season of 1909, and Zobéide in Scheherazade in 1910. Both exotic ballets were choreographed by Fokine, and designed by Léon Bakst. The finale of Cléopâtre inspired Kees van Dongen's Souvenir of the Russian Opera Season 1909. Her partner in Scheherazade was the great Vaslav Nijinsky. Scheherazade was admired at the time for its racy sensuality and sumptuous staging, but these days it is rarely performed; to modern tastes, it is considered too much of a pantomime and its then fashionable Orientalism appears dated.

Rubinstein left the Ballets Russes in 1911.

=== Rubinstein companies ===
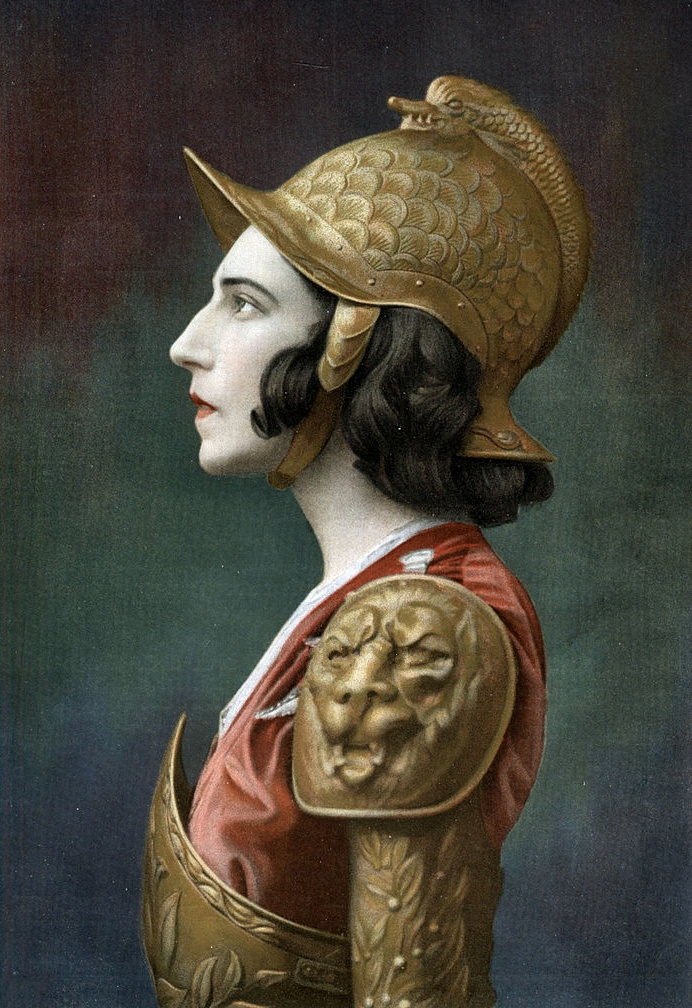
Rubinstein as St. Sebastian in the play Le Martyre de saint Sébastien, 1911

After leaving the Ballets Russes, Rubinstein formed her own dance company, using her inherited wealth, and commissioned several lavish productions. In 1911, she performed in Le Martyre de Saint Sebastien. The creative team was Michel Fokine (choreography); Bakst (design); Gabriele d'Annunzio (text) and score by Debussy. This was both a triumph for its stylized modernism and a scandal; the Archbishop of Paris prohibited Catholics from attending because St. Sebastian was being played by a woman and a Jew.

After the First World War, Rubinstein appeared in a number of plays, and in Staat's Istar at the Paris Opera in 1924. She also played the leading role in the 1921 silent film La Nave (film) based on D'Annunzio's play of the same name and directed by his son.

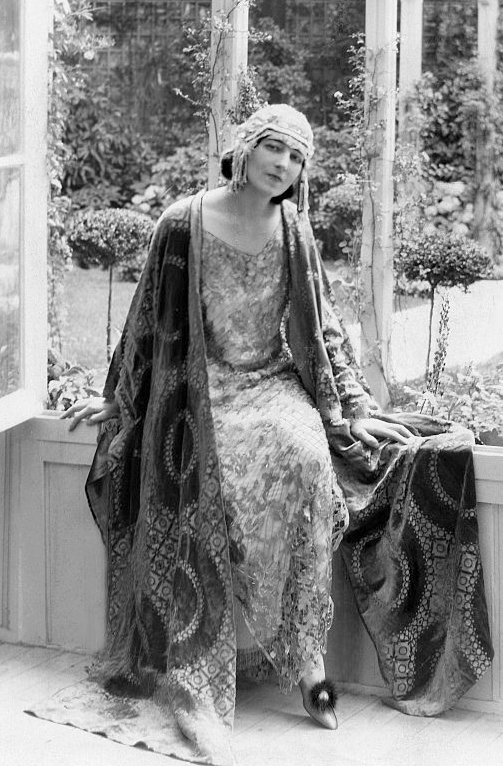
Rubinstein in 1922

Between 1928 and 1929, she directed her own company in Paris with Nijinska as choreographer. She commissioned and performed in Maurice Ravel's Boléro in 1928. Other works developed in 1928 were Massine's David, with music by Sauguet; and Le Baiser de la fée, with music by Stravinsky, and choreography by Nijinska. The repertoire also included The Firebird (L'Oiseau de Feu) with music by Stravinsky, and choreography by Michel Fokine; this had been one of the most sensational creations for the Ballets Russes. The company was revived in 1931 and 1934, with new works. She closed the company in 1935, and gave her last performance in the play Jeanne d'Arc au bûcher in Paris, 1939.

Rubinstein often staged free ballet events and continued to dance until the start of the Second World War.

=== Later life ===
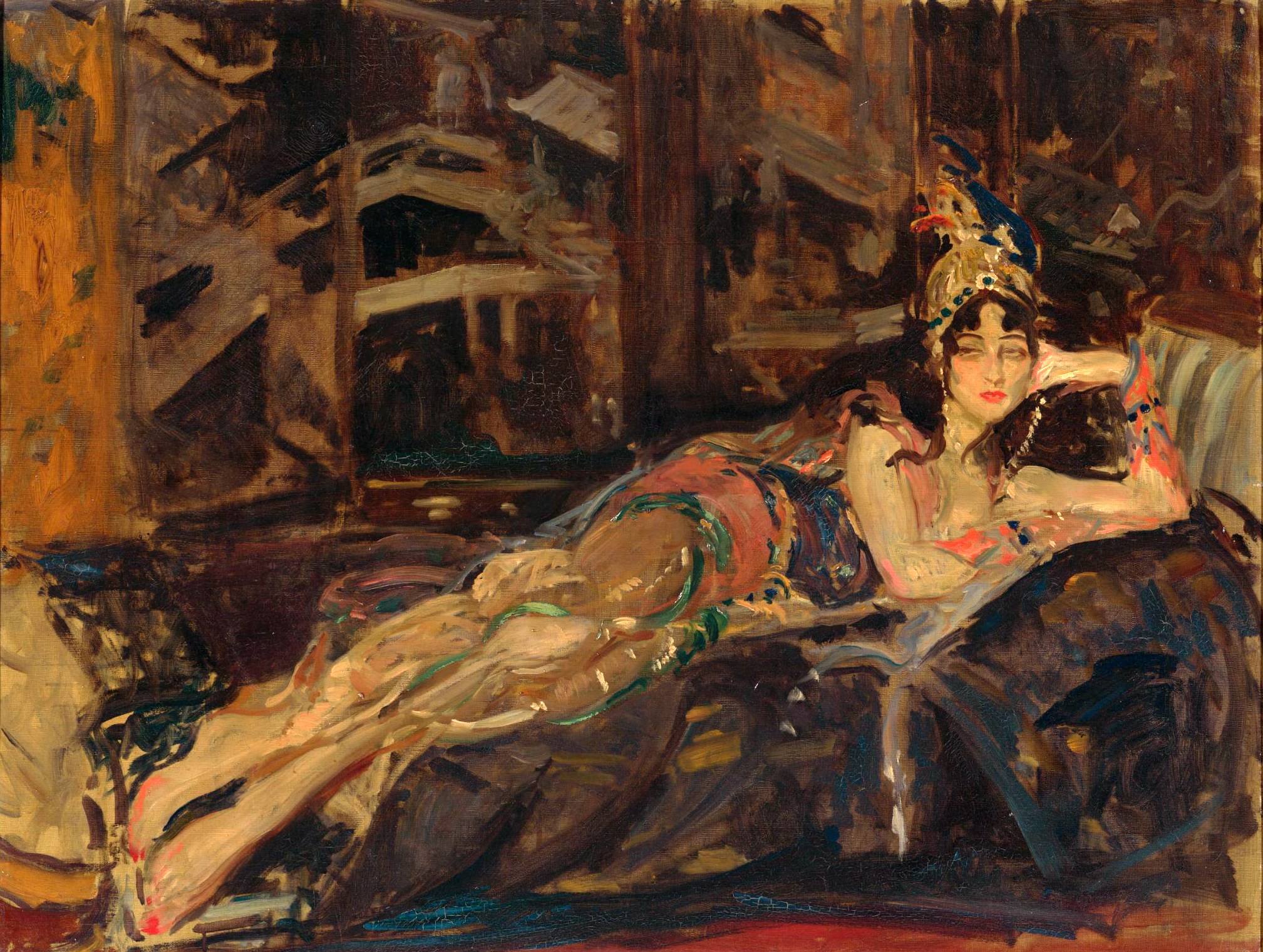
Ida Rubinstein as Zobeide, 1922 by Jacques-Émile Blanche.

Rubinstein is not considered to be in the top tier of ballerinas; she began her training too late for that to have been possible. She did, however, have tremendous stage presence and was able to act. She was also a significant patron and she tended to commission works that suited her abilities, works that mixed dance with drama and stagecraft. In 1934, the French government awarded her the Légion d'honneur, and then in 1939 the Grand Cross of the Légion, its highest honor. In 1935, she was awarded honorary French citizenship, and in 1936 she converted to Roman Catholicism.

In 1940, she left France during the German invasion, and made her way to England via Algeria and Morocco. There she helped wounded Free French soldiers until 1944. Walter Guinness (later Lord Moyne), her long-term lover and sponsor, remained supportive, providing a suite at the Ritz Hotel, until he was assassinated by the Stern Gang in late 1944. She returned to France after the war, living finally at the villa Les Olivades in Vence.

Rubinstein lived the final 10 years of her life in relative quiet. She died in 1960 in Vence, France, and is buried nearby.

== Images and paintings ==
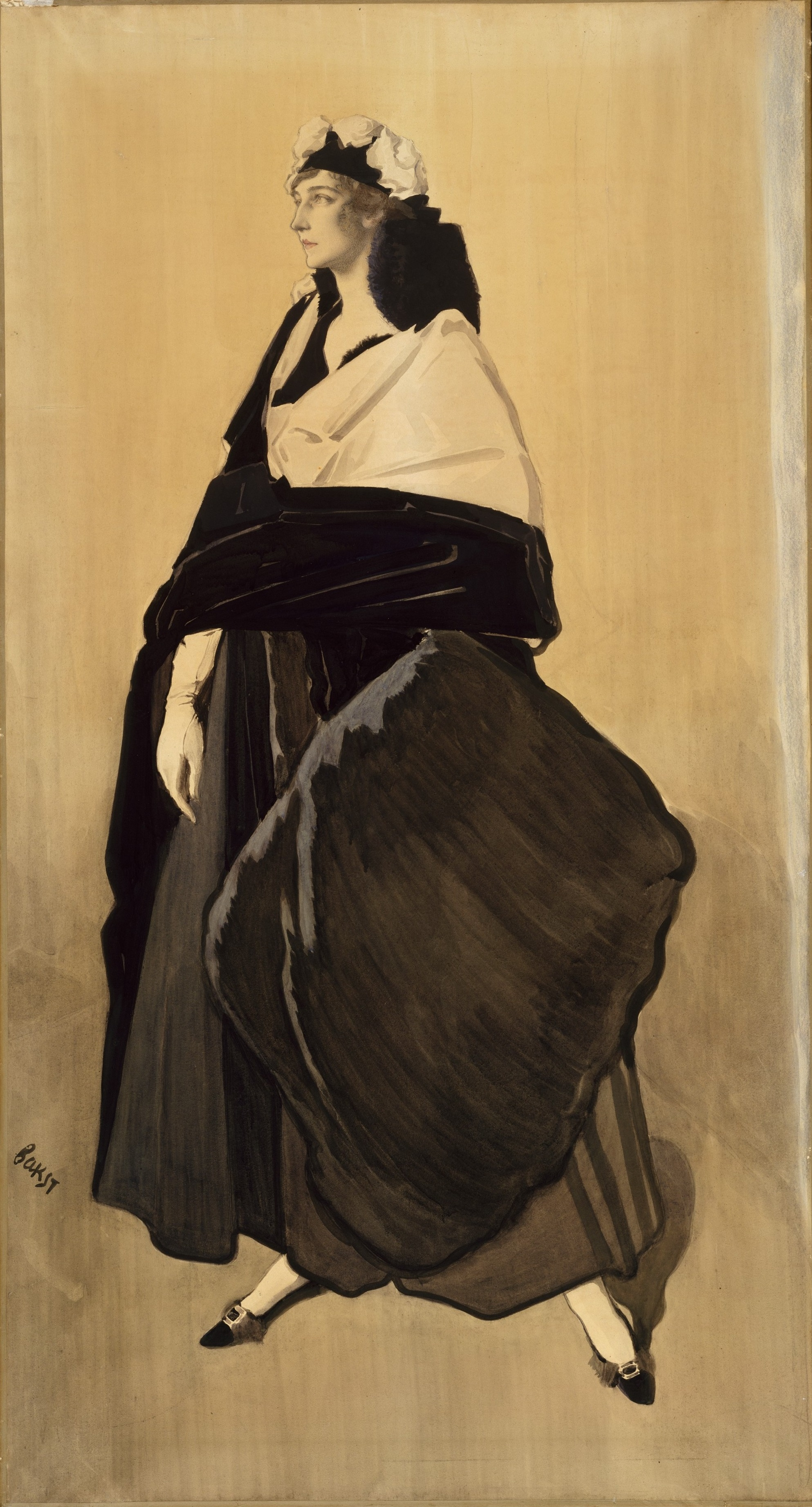
Mme Ida Rubinstein, c. 1910 by Léon Bakst

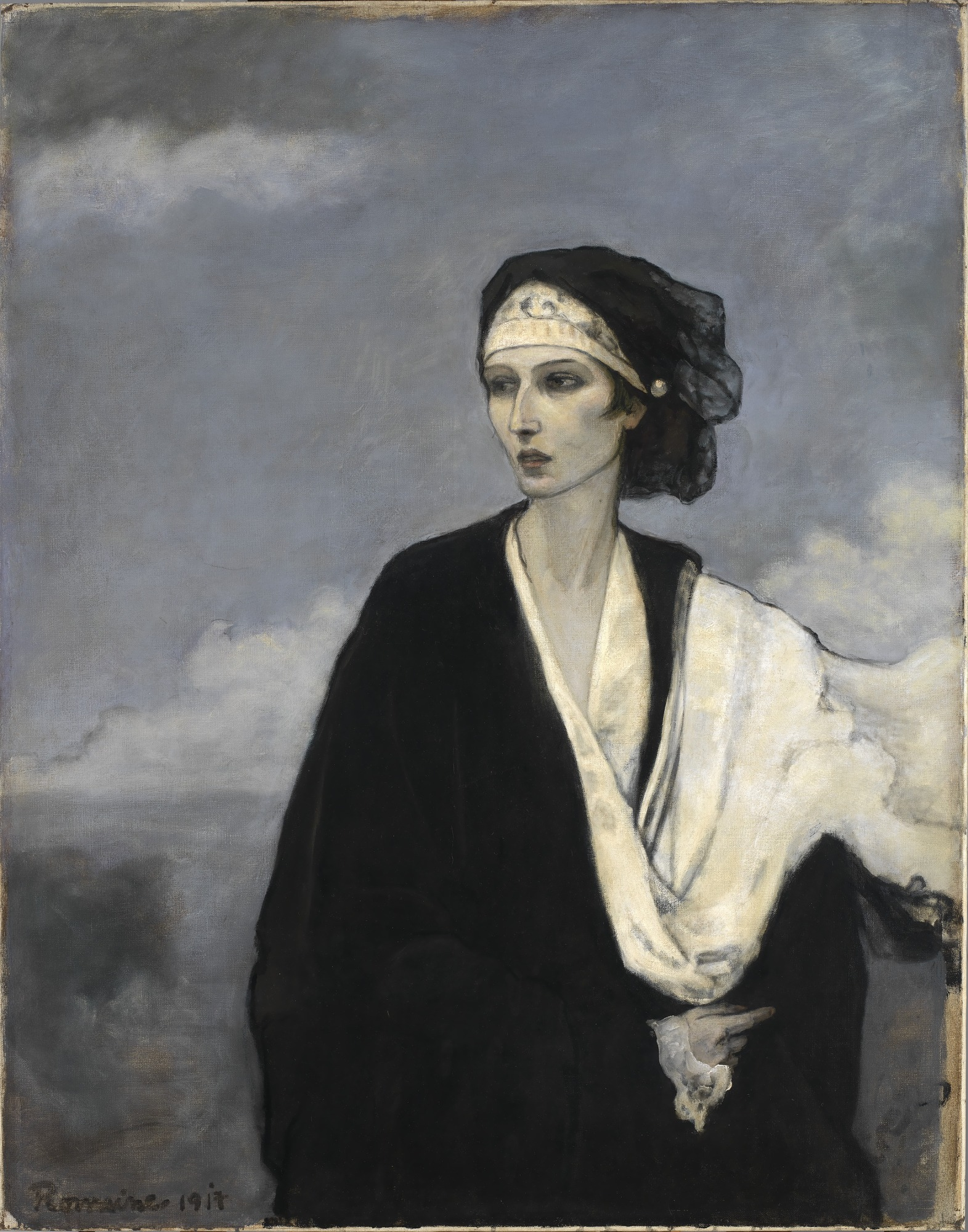
Ida Rubenstein as portrayed by Romaine Brooks

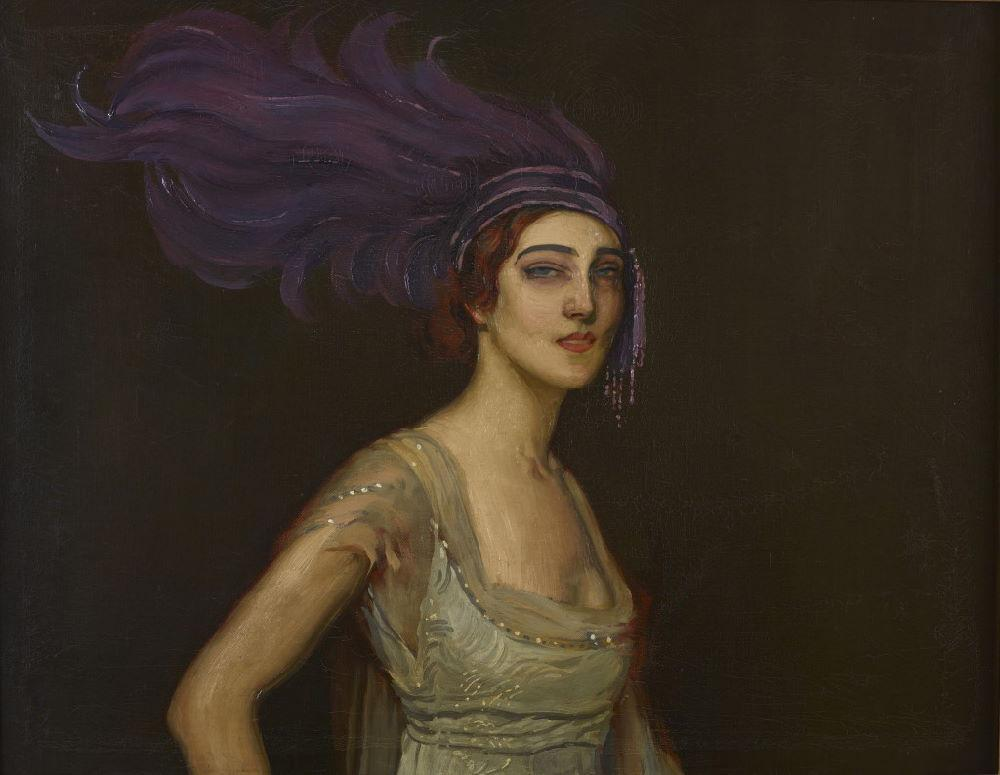
Portrait of Ida Rubinstein, 1913 by Antonio de La Gándara.

Rubinstein was much celebrated in art. Her portrait by Valentin Serov in 1910 marks the most complete realization of his mature style. The Art Deco sculptor Demetre Chiparus produced a Rubinstein figurine, and she was also painted by Antonio de la Gandara and Jacques-Émile Blanche. Costume designer Léon Bakst created numerous images of Rubinstein in various roles. Rubinstein did not like long sittings and earned the reputation of being a difficult subject. For this reason, Blanche and others preferred to work from photographs.

Rubinstein was bisexual, and in 1911 she began a three-year affair with the painter Romaine Brooks, who created several striking portraits, including some of the dancer in the nude, e.g. for La Venus triste. Brooks' portraits were based on "an extraordinary series of photographs taken by Brooks at the time".

Brooks explained Rubinstein's allure to her audiences and artists as follows:

It was Ida Rubinstein's elusive quality that fascinated. She expressed an inner self that had no particular denomination. Her beauty belonged to those mental images that demand manifestation, and whatever period she represented she became its image. In reality she was the crystallization of a poet's image, a painter's vision, and as such she possessed further significance ... It was her gift for impersonating the beauty of every époque, that marked Ida Rubinstein as unique.

== See also ==
- Place des États-Unis
- List of Russian ballet dancers

== Additional references ==
- Toni Bentley (2005) Sisters of Salome, Bison Books, ISBN 0-8032-6241-8
- Michael de Cossart, Ida Rubinstein (1885–1960): A Theatrical Life (Liverpool University Press, 1987), ISBN 0-85323-146-X
- Vicki Woolf, The Story of Ida Rubinstein: Dancing in the Vortex, Harwood Academic Publishers, 2000, ISBN 90-5755-087-3
- La nave (directed by Gabriellino d'Annunzio) on the Internet Movie Database
