= Franchetti =

Franchetti is a surname. Notable people with the surname include:

- Afdera Franchetti (born 1931), Italian noblewoman
- Alberto Franchetti (1860–1942), Italian opera composer
- Arnold Franchetti (1911–1993), Italian composer, son of Alberto
- Leopoldo Franchetti (1847–1917), Italian publicist and politician
- Lisa Franchetti (born 1964), United States Navy admiral
- Raimondo Franchetti (1889–1935), Italian nobleman and explorer
- Rina Franchetti (1907–2010), Italian actress
- Virgil Franchetti (born 1954), Scottish football player
