= Ray Franchetti =

Scottish footballer and manager

Ray Franchetti is a former association football player and manager. A forward, he played for Airdrieonians and Albion Rovers in the Scottish Football League, and then managed Albion Rovers during the 1985–86 season. In 1977, he played in Canada's National Soccer League with Toronto Italia.
