= Ludwig Strakosch =

Austrian baritone

Ludwig Strakosch (1 November 1855 – 14 October 1919) was an Austrian operatic baritone.

== Life ==
Born in Brünn, Strakosch, son of a sugar manufacturer, first took singing lessons with Therese Stolz in Berlin and Louise Reß in Vienna. He then made his debut in Linz as Tell. He then sang in Strasbourg, where he performed the "Trumpeter" for the very first time under Victor Ernst Nessler. After that, he sang in Königsberg, the German Opera in Holland, Breslau (1891), Hamburg (1892) and Cologne (1894). After that he did not accept any further permanent engagements, but worked as a guest performer until he left the stage in 1897. After that he moved to Wiesbaden where he taught singing. From 1910 he worked in Hamburg at the singing school he opened together with his wife Irma Strakosch (1860-1931).

His repertoire included "Don Juan", the "Dutchman", the "Count" in Figaro, "Wolfram", "Tell", "Healing", "Rigoletto", "Pizarro", etc. His appearances in Bucharest with Gemma Bellincioni in Carmen, Faust and La traviata were also particularly noteworthy.

Strakosch also worked as a concert singer and was praised as Eugen Gura's successor, especially with ballads written by Carl Loewe.

Strakosch died in Hamburg at the age of 63.

== Students ==
- Delia Reinhardt
