= Vinnie Moore (footballer) =

English football manager and former footballer

Vinnie Moore (born 21 August 1964) is an English former football player and manager.
