= Le Martyre de saint Sébastien =

1911 five-act musical mystery play

- Mystery play by Claude Debussy
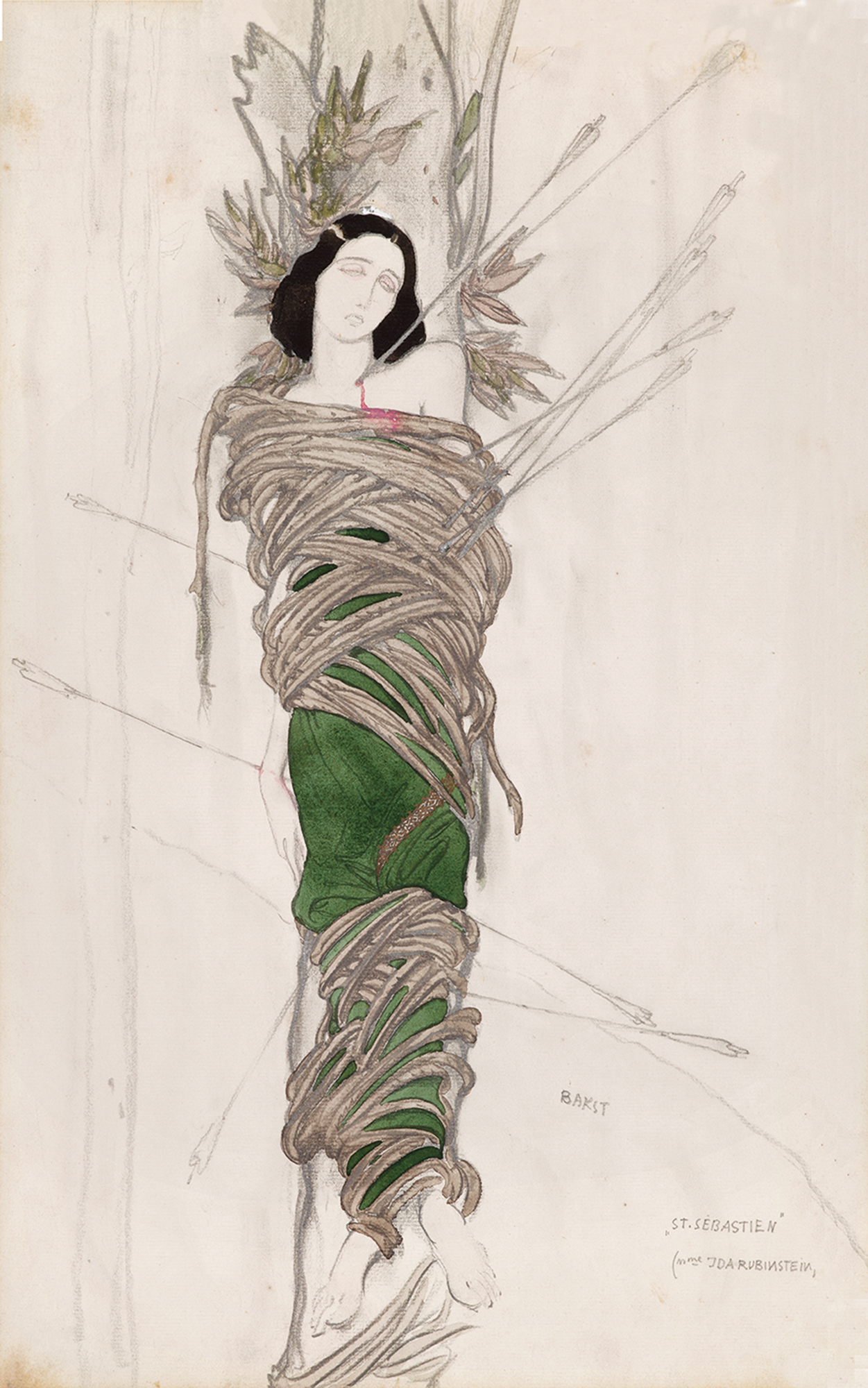
- Illustration by Léon Bakst who designed the stage for the premiere
- Text: by Gabriele D'Annunzio
- Language: French
- Based on: Saint Sebastian
- Performed: 22 May 1911
- Scoring: soprano; 2 altos; choir; orchestra

Le Martyre de saint Sébastien is a five-act musical mystery play on the subject of Saint Sebastian, with a text written in 1911 by the Italian author Gabriele D'Annunzio and incidental music by the French composer Claude Debussy (L.130).

== Background ==
The work was produced in collaboration between Gabriele D'Annunzio (at that time living in France to escape his creditors) and Claude Debussy, and designed as a vehicle for Ida Rubinstein. Debussy's contribution was a large-scale score of incidental music for orchestra and chorus, with solo vocal parts (for a soprano and two altos).

Debussy accepted the commission in February 1911. Some of the material was orchestrated by André Caplet. During auditions for the female semi-chorus, the chorus director Désiré-Émile Inghelbrecht suggested, on hearing Ninon Vallin, that she take over the role of the celestial voice. As Rose Féart (who had been engaged) was absent from the general rehearsal, Vallin sang the role and Debussy insisted on her singing it in the production.

The premiere had sets and costumes designed by Léon Bakst, stage direction by Armand Bour and choreography by Michel Fokine. The orchestra was conducted by André Caplet, and Désiré-Émile Inghelbrecht directed the chorus. Alongside Rubinstein as Saint Sébastien, Adeline Dudlay sang La Mère douloureuse, Véra Sergine sang La Fille malade des fièvres, Ninon Vallin was the off-stage voice, Desjardins was the emperor, and Henry Krauss was the préfet.

Though the first Gabriel Astruc production was attended by scandal (the Archbishop of Paris requested Catholics not attend because the dancer playing St. Sebastian was a woman and a Jew), the work was not successful and did not enter the repertoire; thanks to Debussy's score, however, it has been recorded in abridged and adapted versions several times, notably by Charles Munch (in French), Leonard Bernstein (sung in French, acted in English), and Michael Tilson Thomas (in French).

The days leading up to the first performance, which took place on 22 May 1911 at Théâtre du Châtelet, the Archbishop of Paris, Léon-Adolphe Amette, threatened excommunication for any Catholic who attended the performance, due to the work mixing the sacred and the profane too much, not clearly opposing pagan forces towards Christianity, and even suggested an assimilation of Adonis, the handsome youth who fell for Aphrodite, to Sebastian. Moreover, Sebastian was portrayed by Ida Rubinstein, a Jewish woman.

Though Debussy's complete score still exists and can be performed in its original form (including linking narration taken from the original play, if the story is not staged), the work is very seldom heard in this way. More often performed is a four-movement orchestral suite made up of music extracted from the score and subtitled 'Fragments Symphoniques' (Symphonic Fragments). In addition, there are also two short brass fanfares which are sometimes presented with the symphonic fragments.

Though the play was not a success, the suite was given a British premiere on 24 August 1915 at the Promenade Concerts at Queen's Hall, under the baton of Henry Wood.

== Mystère en cinq actes ==
Following the acts of the original play, each section is called a 'mansion'. The narrator sets the scene at the beginning of each section.

1. La Cour des lys (The Court of Lilies): The narrator invites the public to view Sébastien's life as if studying five stained glass windows. The first depicts the twins Marc and Marcellien being tortured in a public place while Sébastien calls for a sign from God. As he dances on hot embers, lilies emerge from the ground.
2. La Chambre magique (The Magic Chamber): Sébastien overturns false idols, enters the Temple of the Virgin Erigone, and defeats pagan forces there. Another Virgin sings a lament.
3. Le Concile des faux dieux (The Council of the False Gods): In a council of false gods, the emperor hails Sébastien as a "beauteous youth" whom he wants crowned. Sébastien claims he carries a crown, one forged by prayer and faith. The infatuated emperor still wants to make Sébastien a god, and when Sébastien dances Jesus's Passion and refuses the emperor's lyre, he orders him to be put to death.
4. Le Laurier blessé (The Wounded Laurel): In Apollo's laurel grove, Sébastien receives each arrow crying "Encore!". Alone, he sees stigmata appear on his hands and surrenders to holy ecstasy.
5. Le Paradis (Paradise): Sébastien's soul is received in heaven by choirs of martyrs, virgins, apostles, and angels singing in unison.

== Fragments symphoniques ==
1. La Cour de Lys (The Court of Lilies)
2. Danse extatique et Final du 1^{er} Acte (Ecstatic Dance and Finale of the 1st Act)
3. La Passion (The Passion)
4. Le Bon Pasteur (The Good Shepherd)

The first 'fragment' begins with a "liturgical-like" section with parallel chords, not dissimilar to the close of La cathédrale engloutie, followed by music associated with the deaths of two young Christians in Act 1; the 'Dance' is also from the first act, where Sébastien dances on burning embers "scored with immense colour and variety", then his vision of heaven. The third movement depicts Sébastien's masochism as he warmly anticipates the arrows. Act 4 provides the basis for the fourth fragment, in the setting of the laurels in Apollo's Grove and a vision of the shepherd and a sacrificial lamb with the music, featuring a solo cor anglais "at its most suggestive and atmospheric".

== Recordings ==
The work has been recorded several times, in abridged format or with the symphonic music only. The orchestral version, arranged by Caplet, is generally described as Fragments symphoniques, and was published in 1912. Conductors who have recorded this version have included Guido Cantelli, Pierre Monteux, Jean Martinon, Daniel Barenboim and Esa-Pekka Salonen.

In 1953 an LP of music from the score was issued by Allegro Records, with the Oklahoma City Symphony Orchestra and Chorale, Frances Yeend and Miriam Stewart, sopranos, and Anna Kaskas, contralto, conducted by Victor Alessandro. In April 1954 André Cluytens conducted a full recording with the Orchestre National de la Radiodiffusion Française, Rita Gorr, Solange Michel, Martha Angelici, Mattiwilda Dobbs, Jacqueline Brumaire and the Raymond Saint-Paul Chorus. The following month an LP of music from the work was recorded by the Suisse Romande Orchestra under Ernest Ansermet with Suzanne Danco, Nancy Waugh, and Lise de Gontmollin and the Union Chorale de la Tour de Peilz.

Leonard Bernstein adapted the text and recorded the work in 1966 with his wife, Felicia Montealegre, in the role of Sebastian, and the actor Fritz Weaver as narrator and other speaking roles, with the New York Philharmonic, along with Adele Addison, Virginia Babikian, Marlena Kleinman, Joanna Simon, and The Choral Art Society. The work was given in Bernstein's English translation of the D'Annunzio text, with added narration.

In 1991 it was recorded digitally with soloists Ann Murray, Sylvia McNair, Nathalie Stutzmann, narrator Leslie Caron and the London Symphony Orchestra and Chorus conducted by Michael Tilson Thomas. In 2011 Thierry Fischer, conducting the BBC National Chorus and Orchestra of Wales, recorded the complete score. According to the CD booklet, the latter recording uses the "definitive scholarly version" of the score by Durand (2009), edited by Pierre Boulez and Eko Kasaba.
