= Jocelyne Taillon =

French opera singer

- Jocelyne Taillon, c. 1980
- Born: 19 May 1941; Doudeville, France
- Died: 10 June 2004 (aged 63); Rouen, France
- Occupation: Operatic soprano
- Organizations: Opéra National de Paris

Jocelyne Taillon (19 May 1941 – 10 June 2004) was a French mezzo-soprano who was for most of her career a member of the Paris Opera, but also appeared internationally.

== Life and career ==
Taillon was born in Doudeville on 19 May 1941. She studies voice with soprano Germaine Lubin. She won first prize for singing at the Monte Carlo Competition in 1966, and then embarked on a career as a concert artist. In 1968 she made her debut at the Grand Théâtre de Bordeaux, as Ariane in Ariane et Barbe-Bleue by Dukas. She performed in Geneva in Macbeth by Bloch. She was then seen at the houses in Nantes, Marseille and at the Paris Opéra. In 1970 she took part in the Holland Festival. Taillon appeared at the 1971 Glyndebourne Festival as Geneviève in Debussy's Pell.

Taillon made her Metropolitan Opera debut in 1979 (Cieca in La Gioconda). She performed there in Puccini's Suor Angelica alongside Renata Scotto in 1981, and in 1983 as Anna in Les Troyens by Berlioz for the opening of the season. She sang the role of Antonia's Mother in Offenbach's Les contes d'Hoffmann, directed by Jean-Pierre Ponnelle and conducted by James Levine, at the 1982 Salzburg Festival, and in 1986 portrayed Marcellina in Mozart's Le nozze di Figaro there. She appeared as Quickly in Verdi's Falstaff and as Erda in Wagner's Der Ring des Nibelungen. In Nantes she took part in rare revivals of French works such as Le Roi l'a dit by Delibes and Pénélope by Fauré.

Her voice was described as "deep and warm" and she displayed a "dramatic intensity which allowed her to make a mark in secondary roles". She made recordings of some of her roles, including Geneviève, conducted by Armin Jordan and the Mother in Ravel's L'enfant et les sortilèges, conducted by André Previn.

Taillon died in Rouen on 10 June 2004.

== Selected recordings ==
- Rossini – William Tell (Royal Philharmonic Orchestra, Lamberto Gardelli) recorded 1972, EMI – Hedwige
- Debussy – Pelléas et Mélisande (Orchestre de Lyon, Serge Baudo) recorded 1978, Eurodisc – Geneviève
- Ravel – L'enfant et les sortilèges (London Symphony Orchestra, André Previn) recorded 1981, EMI – Mother, Cup, Dragonfly, Owl
- Berlioz – Les Troyens (Metropolitan Opera orchestra and chorus, James Levine) recorded 1983, Deutsche Grammophon DVD – Anna
