= Suzanne Danco =

Belgian soprano (1911–2000)

- Suzanne Danco (photo with dedication)
- Born: 22 January 1911; Ixelles, Belgium
- Died: 10 August 2000 (aged 89); Fiesole, Italy
- Occupations: operatic soprano; voice teacher
- Years active: 1940–1970
- Organizations: Orchestre de la Suisse Romande

Suzanne Danco (22 January 1911 – 10 August 2000) was a Belgian international soprano whose career encompassed the opera stages of Europe from Mozart to 20th century roles, recitals, recordings of opera and songs, and later teaching.

== Career ==
Danco was born in Ixelles and grew up in a Flemish background, although French was her native language. She studied piano, music history and singing at the Conservatoire Royal de Bruxelles, and in 1936 won a vocal competition in Vienna after which conductor Erich Kleiber recommended that she continue her studies in Prague with Fernando Carpi. Grove notes that "the unusual breadth of her culture was shown by her command of many different styles".

She appears to have made her concert debut in Italy in 1940, and her stage debut in 1941 at the Genoa Opera, singing Fiordiligi in Mozart's Così fan tutte. She appeared in most of the major opera houses in Europe through the 1940s and 1950s, including at La Scala (Jocasta in Oedipus rex by Stravinsky, and Ellen Orford in Peter Grimes), at the Teatro di San Carlo (Marie in Wozzeck which she also sang for the BBC in concert), at the Royal Opera House Covent Garden (Mimi in La bohème), and at the festivals of Glyndebourne and Aix-en-Provence (Fiordiligi and Donna Elvira). In 1951, she sang in Boston at a special Peabody Mason Concert series commemorating the Paris Bi-Millennial year.

Although her operatic repertoire was not large, it was notable for its stylistic range, from Mozart roles (Fiordiligi, Anna, Elvira, Cherubino and the Countess) to modern works by Berg, Britten and Stravinsky. Her tone was described as cool, clear, and aristocratic, and well suited to French roles such as Mélisande in Pelléas et Mélisande (preserved in a Decca set of 1952 under Ansermet) and the Princess in L'enfant et les sortilèges by Ravel. Yet she also had success in some Italian works such as The Barber of Seville and La bohème. Her interpretation of Donna Anna in Don Giovanni under the direction Josef Krips is considered the standard for that opera.

She is also remembered as a recitalist and concert artist, again in a wide range of styles from Bach cantatas to song cycles by Britten and de Falla, but especially in the repertoire of French melodies where her diction and command of style were heard to particular advantage.

Danco retired from singing in 1970 but remained active as a voice teacher, both at the Accademia Musicale Chigiana in Siena and as a regular visitor to the Britten-Pears School at Snape. She died at the age of 89 on 10 August 2000 at her home in Fiesole near Florence. Her villa there was named "Amarilli", after the song of that name by Caccini, which had brought her to the attention of record collectors in 1949.

== Recordings ==
Danco made many recordings for Decca Records (released on the London label in the U.S.) in the 1940s and 1950s. Some of these are available on compact disc (CD), including Gluck's Orphée et Eurydice conducted by Hans Rosbaud in 1956, Don Giovanni (as Donna Anna) conducted by Josef Krips, and Le nozze di Figaro (Cherubino) under Erich Kleiber in 1955. For details, see Le nozze di Figaro (Kleiber recording).

She also worked closely with Ernest Ansermet and the Suisse Romande Orchestra on a series of recordings in the 1950s, including Ravel's two one-act operas L'heure espagnole and L'enfant et les sortilèges, Debussy's Le martyre de Saint Sébastien, and Fauré's Requiem.

There have been a number of CD reissues of Suzanne Danco's recital performances and recordings, including a 2001 compilation disc entitled The Singers: Suzanne Danco with recordings made between 1947 and 1952.
