= Lentini (name) =

Lentini is an Italian surname and an occasional given name that may refer to the following notable people:

Surname

- Domenico Lentini, Blessed (1770−1828), Italian Roman Catholic priest
- Fehlandt Lentini (born 1977), former American professional baseball player
- Frank Lentini (1889−1966), Italian-American sideshow performer with three legs, who toured with numerous circuses
- Gianluigi Lentini (born 1969), former Italian professional footballer
- Giacomo da Lentini (first half of 13th century), senior poet of the Sicilian School and notary at the court of the Holy Roman Emperor Frederick II
- Giovanni Lentini the Elder (1830−1898), Italian painter and scenic designer
- James Lentini (born 1958), American composer, guitarist, and academic administrator
- Licinia Lentini (born 1959), Italian actress and television personality
- Marie-Hélène Lentini (born circa 1965), French actress and comedian
- Ramón Lentini (born 1988), Argentine football striker
- Rocco Lentini (1858−1953), Italian painter, responsible for the ceiling decorations of the Teatro Massimo in Palermo.
- Stefano Lentini (born 1974), music composer based in Rome

Given name

- Lentini Caciano (born 2001), Curaçaoan football midfielder

== See also ==
- Lago di Lentini, in the Province of Siracusa, Sicily, Italy
