= Iain MacNeil =

Canadian opera singer

- Born: Canada
- Occupation: Operatic baritone
- Organizations: Oper Frankfurt
- Website: iainmacneil.com/about/

Iain MacNeil is a Canadian baritone in opera and concert who has performed leading roles at major opera houses in North America and Europe. He is based at the Oper Frankfurt, where he appeared in the title role in a new production of Dallapiccola's Ulisse in 2022.

== Career ==
MacNeil was born in Canada. He was a member of the studio of the Canadian Opera Company where he performed the title role of Mozart's Le nozze di Figaro in his last year. Other roles there included Fiorello in Rossini's Il barbiere di Siviglia, Marquis d’Obigny in Verdi's La traviata and Dancaïro in Bizet's Carmen. In 2013, he took part in Emmerich Smola Young Singers Project of the Salzburg Festival. He appeared as Tarquinius in Britten's The Rape of Lucretia at the Banff Centre in Toronto in 2016, and appeared as Mozart's Don Giovanni with Saskatoon Opera in 2017. He received a scholarship by the Richard Wagner Verband Frankfurt in 2018.

MacNeil became a member of the Oper Frankfurt with the 2019/20 season, where he performed roles such as Melot in Wagner's Tristan und Isolde, Tadeusz in Weinberg's Die Passagierin, Johann in Massenet's Werther, and four roles in Martinů's Julietta, among others. He appeared further as the Minstrel in Humperdinck's Königskinder, a role that he also performed at the Tirol Festival in Erl. In 2022, he appeared in the title role in a new production of Dallapiccola's Ulisse in Frankfurt, directed by Tatjana Gürbaca and conducted by Francesco Lanzillotta. His colleagues included Juanita Lascarro as Penelope and Danylo Matviienko as Antinoos, one of her suitors. His voice in the role was described by a reviewer from Süddeutsche Zeitung as "gloriously bronze-saturated baritone that exudes an almost tenor warmth in the high register" (mit einem herrlich bronzen gesättigten Bariton, der in der Höhe eine fast tenorale Wärme verströmt"), who portrayed the "character's self-exegeses" with excellent diction and "immaculate legato". He appeared as the Duke in Tchaikovsky's The Enchantress in 2022 when the opera was first performed in Frankfurt, directed by Vasily Barkhatov, alongside Asmik Grigorian and Elena Manistina as the Duchess.
