= Eytan Pessen =

Israeli musical artist

Eytan Pessen איתן פסן
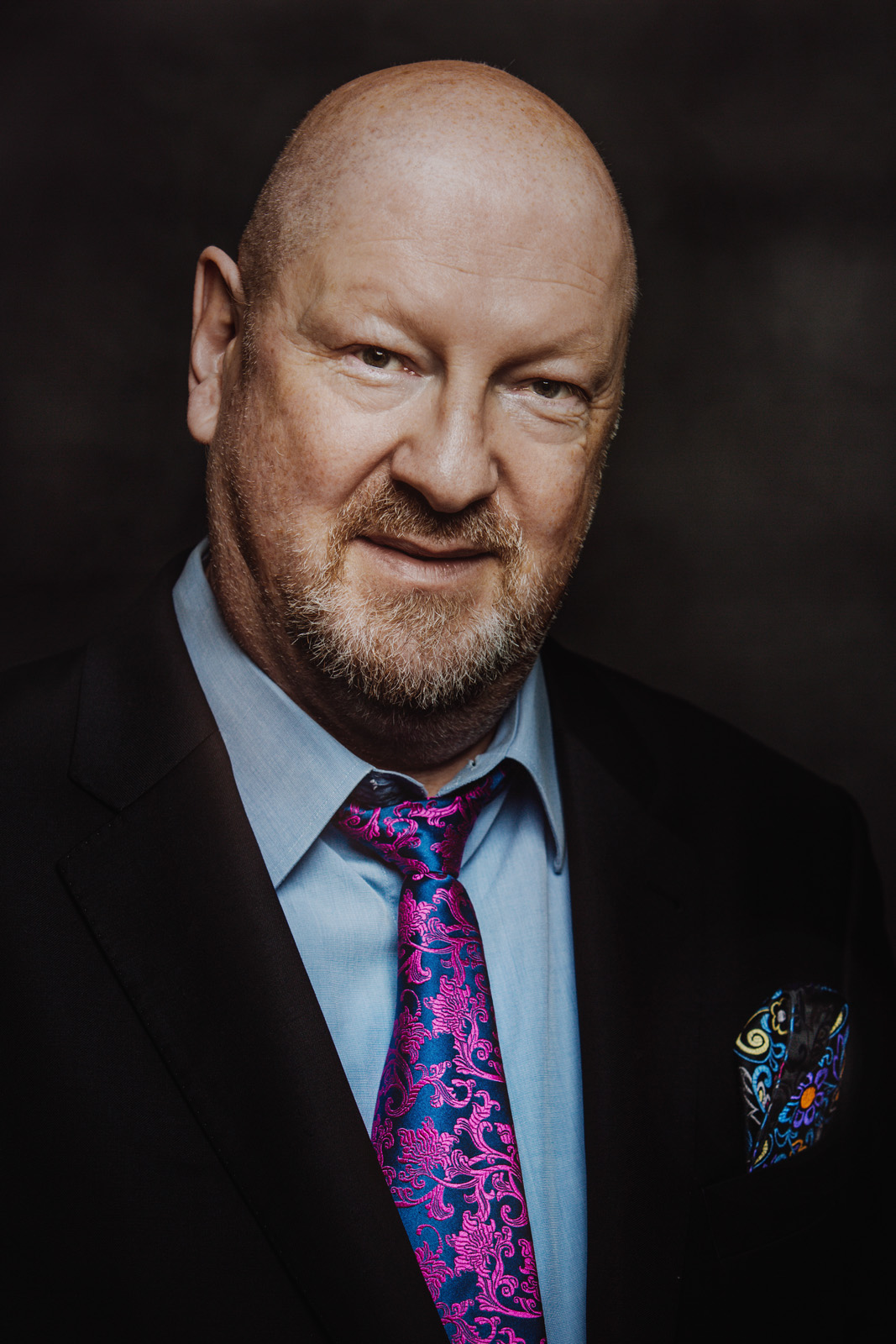

Background information
- Born: August 30, 1961
- Origin: Haifa, Israel
- Genres: classical, opera
- Occupations: pianist, vocal coach, voice teacher, opera director
- Years active: 1990–present
- Label: Hera

Eytan Pessen (Hebrew: איתן פסן; born 30 August 1961 in Haifa, Israel) is a German Israeli pianist and voice teacher, currently at the Opera houses of Amsterdam, Frankfurt, Hamburg, Vienna (Volksoper), Zürich and international festivals. He was former opera director of the Semperoper in Dresden, artistic advisor to Teatro Massimo in Palermo, Teatro San Carlo in Naples, and former casting director of the Staatstheater Stuttgart.

== Early years ==
Born in Haifa, Israel, to parents of German-Jewish heritage, he studied Piano (with Dr. Nilly Shilo, Walter Aufhauser, Irina Zaritskaya and Dina Turgeman), composition (with Andre Hajdu and Daniel V. Oppenheim), and musicology at the Tel-Aviv University Rubin Academy, with a Bachelor of Music, summa cum Laude, in 1983, and a Masters of Music, magna cum laude, in 1984. Further Piano studies at the Curtis Institute of Music in Philadelphia with Vladimir Sokoloff, (voice studies at Curtis with Robert Grooters), and at the Juilliard School in New York with Marshal Williamson, Margo Garrett and Alberta Masiello. In New York he worked as pianist and coach for the Metropolitan Opera young artist's programme.

== Stuttgart Opera 1991-2006 ==
As head of music staff and the casting director at the Stuttgart Opera in Germany, he worked under the German Dramaturge-Intendant Klaus Zehelein and Co-Intendant Pamela Rosenberg. When she left for San Francisco in 2001, he became casting director. In Stuttgart, Pessen launched the international carriers of conductors Constantinos Carydis, Nicola Luisotti, Carlo Montanaro and Robin Ticciati. Singers Lucas Meachem and Eva-Maria Westbroek began their international careers during his Stuttgart tenure as well. Other guest artists were Brandon Jovanovich, Catherine Naglestad and Jonas Kaufmann, who explored Italian repertoire as Barbiere-Almaviva, Rodolfo and Alfredo. In Stuttgart Pessen promoted a series of unknown baroque and classic works, and conceived the chamber music series for the orchestra at the Mozart-Saal, which is still running today. Under Zehelein's leadership the Stuttgart Opera won the Opera house of the year award of European critics six times during the fifteen years.

== RUHR.2010 2007-2010 ==
Eytan Pessen was artistic advisor to the RUHR.2010 cultural festival under music director Steven Sloane. An intense collaboration ensued with the composer Hans Werner Henze, 2010 became a year-long Hans Werner Henze project, which spanned many cities, opera and ballet companies as well as symphony orchestras and chamber music groups. Henze wrote his last opera, Gisela! For the RUHR.2010 (an opera for and about youth, premiered at the RuhrTriennale).

== Semperoper Dresden 2010-2013 ==
As opera director of the Semperoper, he invited the composer Hans Werner Henze and the director Stefan Herheim to return each season for different projects. He chose to collaborate with a young generation of directors including Bettina Bruinier, Jan Phillip Gloger, Florentine Klepper, Axel Köhler, Michael Schulz, Elisabeth Stöppler and Manfred Weiss.

Interested in the artistic benefits of a stable musical ensemble working together over a long period, he chose to extend the Ensemble and the young ensemble (the Dresden opera's studio programme) rather than invest in established guests. Artists such as Scott Connor, Emily Dorn, Vanessa Goikoexea, Evan Hughes, Christopher Magiera, Amanda Majeski, Marjorie Owens, Tichina Vaughn, Rachel Willis-Sørensen and Sebastian Wartig belonged to the permanent ensemble. Conductors that made their debut in Dresden include Josep Caballé Domenech, Julia Jones (conductor), Nicola Luisotti, Michele Mariotti, Carlo Montanaro, Pier Giorgio Morandi, Henrik Nánási, Daniel Oren and Omer Meir Wellber. Pessen widened the repertory span to include commissions from de:Miroslav Srnka and Lucia Ronchetti, as well as Karl Amadeus Hartmann’s Simplicius Simplicissimus, Jaromir Weinberger’s Svanda Dudák, (Schwanda the Bagpiper), Kurt Weill’s Street Scene (opera), Hans Werner Henze's Gisela! and We Come to the River. For this performance the famous theatre interior (by the architect Gottfried Semper) was completely rebuilt with three vast set parts (designed by Rebecca Ringst and Anette Hunger) jutting into the audience space and reaching up toward the balcony.

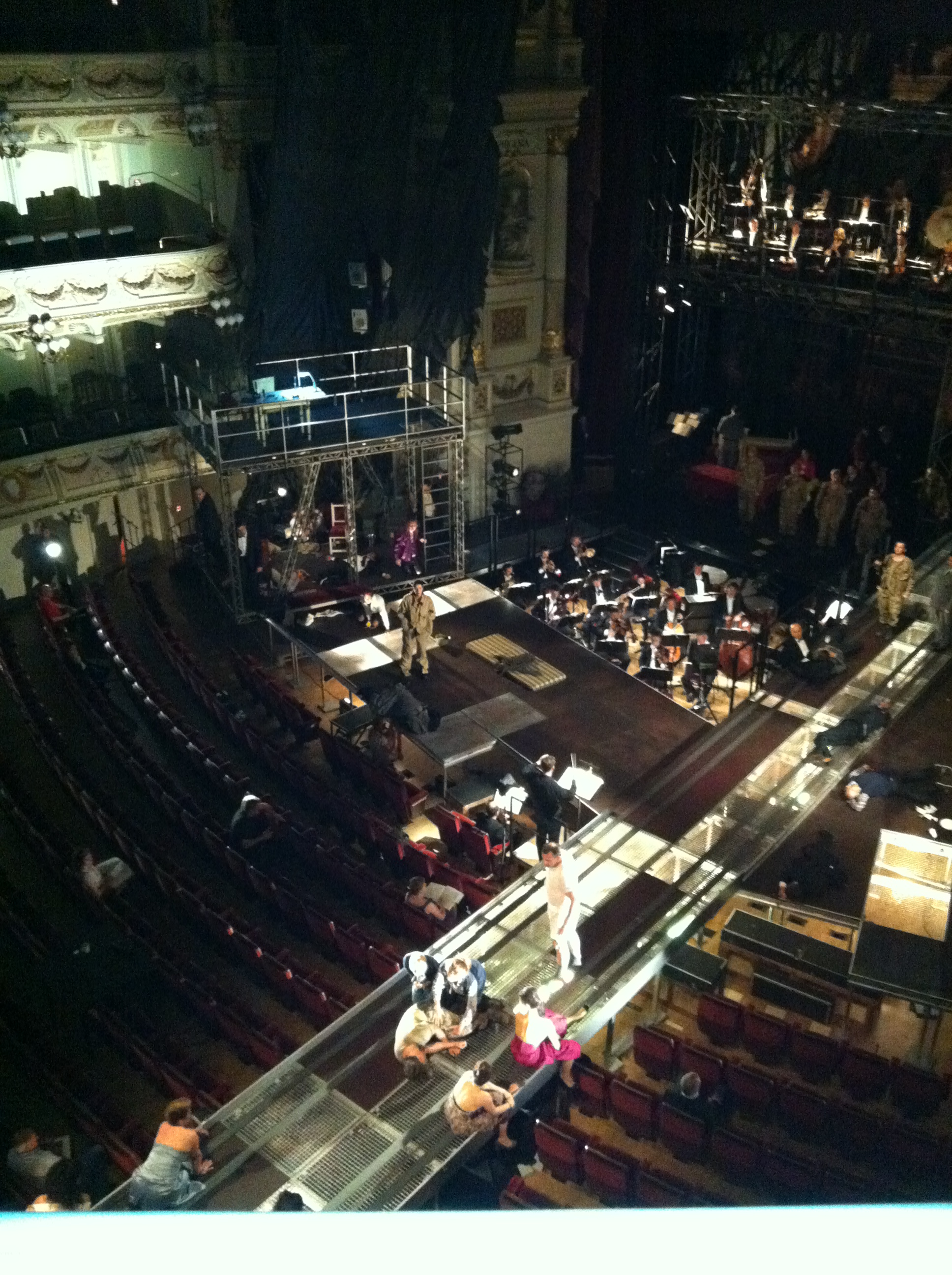
Henze We Come to the River, at the Semperoper

For the Wagner year 2013 he conceived a mini-festival that explored Richard Wagner's development years in Dresden, combining Wagner's The Flying Dutchman with Gaspare Spontini's La Vestale and Halevy's La Juive.

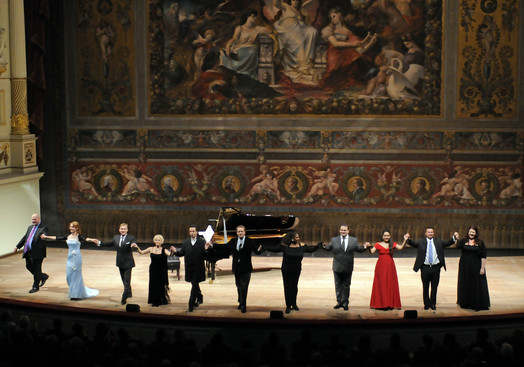
Soiree at the Semperoper, 2011

Opening up the Semperoper to the general public, he often wrote essays and editorials; in one case counting the calories burnt going to different operas, or imagining a conversation with the Gargoyles decorating the new building of the Semperoper. For the programme notes of Alcina he wrote a poem describing the first performance of Alcina through the eyes of a young boy.

== Pianist, Voice teacher and coach ==
Eytan Pessen now teaches voice and piano; since 2007 at the Frankfurt Opera, since 2014 at the IOS in Zürich, since 2018 at the Dutch national opera since 2020 at the Hamburg State Opera, and since 2022 at the Volksoper Wien.

He often gives masterclasses for singers, pianists and accompanists at the Les Azuriales festival, Meistersinger Akademie in Neumarkt, the Irish National Opera, the Scuola d’Opera in Bologna Duszniki Zdroj, Oberlin in Italy, San Francisco Opera, North Carolina School of Arts, Kyoto University of the Arts, Kaunas Music Academy, New Israeli Opera, Vinterakademi Voksenåsen (Oslo), the Mikhailovsky theatre in Saint Petersburg Festival FAOT in Sonora, Mexico, the Orquesta Filarmónica de Bogotá, The Turku festival in Finland, and the theatres of Stuttgart, Graz and Dresden, Ópera de bellas artes in Mexico City, Fundación Ibáñez Atkinson al Teatro Nacional de Bellas Artes in Santiago, Chile, the Theaterakademie in Munich, the Académie of the Paris national opera and from 2013-2020 at the Akademia Operowa of the Grand Theatre, Warsaw (Teatr Wielki i Opera Narodowa w Warszawie), as well as numerous workshops for ENOA.

Pessen performs in recitals and concerts with Giorgio Berrugi, Justina Bluj, Andrei Bondarenko, Emily Dorn, Gala El Hadidi, Andrzej Filończyk, Armelle Arménouhi Khourdoïan, Pawel Konik, Maciej Kwaśnikowski, Keith Lewis, Angela Liebold, Amanda Majeski, Markus Marquardt, Danylo Matviienko, Christa Mayer, Paula Murrihy, Marjorie Owens, Michał Partyka, Christoph Pohl, Matthias Rexroth, Katharina Ruckgaber, Iurii Samoilov, Michal Shamir, Merto Sungu, Mikołaj Trąbka, Tichina Vaughn, Eva-Maria Westbroek, Rachel Willis-Sørensen Jan Żądło and Mira Zakai.

As a voice teacher, Pessen has worked with such singers as Alina Adamski, Xabier Anduaga, Alejandro Del Angel, Michael Fabiano, Andrzej Filonczyk, Pawel Konik, Tomasz Kumięga, Aleksey Kursanov, Iain MacNeil, Danylo Matviienko, Jakub Józef Orliński, Kang Wang, Jasmin White, Hubert Zapiór and Jan Żądło.

With Motti Kastón and Helene Schneiderman he produced a CD of songs in Jiddish and Ladino. Recent appearances include the Concertgebouw Amsterdam, Rheingau Musikfestival, Bochum Symphony, and the theatres of Darmstadt, Frankfurt, Stuttgart and Dresden, the Rossini in Wildbad Festival, the Miskolc Festival, as well as radio broadcasts NDR Hamburg, DeutschlandRadio Berlin, the Berlin Philharmonie and Stuttgart opera.

== Consulting and Judge ==
He was jury member of the Concorso Lirico Salvatore Licitra in Milan, the Stanislav Moniuszko competition in Warsaw, Antonina Campi International Voice competition in Lublin, Concorso Voci Verdiane Busseto, the Belvedere competition in Vienna, as well as the Marcello Giordani competition in Catania, the Aviv competition in Tel Aviv, El Premio de Canto Ciudad de Bogotá, The 5th International Solomiya Krushelnytska Opera Singers Competition, Concorso Internationale di Assisi, Concorso Aslico in Como and the Queen Sonja International Music Competition. He was advisor to the Juan Pons International Competition in Palma de Mallorca. The year 2011 he was artistic advisor for the Teatro San Carlo in Naples and from December 2012 to 2014, was advisor to Teatro Massimo in Palermo, where he programmed Richard Strauss’ Feuersnot, Jaromír Weinberger's Schwanda the Bagpiper and Hans Werner Henze's Gisela!.

== Sources ==
- Interview: Marietta Piekenbrock der schauplatz ist oberhausen, Steven Sloane and Eytan Pessen in conversation with Kulturhauptstadt Europas Ruhr.2010, published by Ruhr2010, 2009
- Interview: REGJO Wagnerspuren ‚Semper Wagner’ S.22-24 Special edition Wagnerspuren Sachsen, April 2013
- Michael Kerstan Gisela!, 13 April 2008, in Hans Werner Henze, work diary excerpts published in das henze-projekt neue musik für eine metropole, 2009, RUHR.2010
- Biography in the programme for the May 10, 2013 Wagner-Soiree ‚A birthday song-bouquet for Richard Wagner’, Semperoper Dresden
- Joachim Lange, An der Schwelle zur Professionalität, Die Deutsche Bühne, January 2012, S.40-41
- Revolution in der Semperoper, Sächsische Zeitung 11.12.2012
- Adieux Frau Hessler, Sächsische Zeitung 24.11.2012
- Staatstheater Stuttgart, Spielzeit 2004/05 und Spielzeit 2005/06
- Video interview, teatro Massimo in Palermo (retrieved July 2013)
- Youtube Eulogy for the deceased general director of the Semperoper, Ulrike Hessler. (retrieved July, 2013)
- Radio Interview (in Polish) Moniuszko Competition

== Writings ==
Poems

- Eytan Pessen, Chopin in Stuttgart, in C. E. Chaffin, The Best of the Melic Review, 2001 pp. 88–93, ISBN pending
- Eytan Pessen, Chamber Music, in Kammerkonzerte 2004/05, Staatstheater Stuttgart p. 74
- Eytan Pessen „Alcina“ in Covent Garden, 1735, in Programmheft Alcina, Semperoper Dresden, October, 2011

Essays(selection)

- Eytan Pessen, Endings and Beginnings, in „Anders“, raumzeit3 Verlag, ISBN 398110076X ISBN 978-3981100761 (2006)
- Eytan Pessen, Über Musen, Masken und Magie in „Saisonvorschau Semperoper Dresden“ 2011/12 pp. 14–17, Yearbook – season catalogue for 2011/12, published by Semperoper Dresden
- Eytan Pessen, Zusammenhängende Reliquien, Eine Geschichte über Richard Wagner und Gottfried Semper. Special publication for the Wagner year 2013, Semperoper Dresden.
- A row of essays in the opera programme notes of the Semperoper Dresden, letters to composers (selection) Sehr verehrter Maestro Hasse August, 2010, Lieber Hans September, 2010, Dear Kurt Weill, Juni 2011, Sommo Maestro Monteverdi, Februar 2011
- Eytan Pessen, Rozhinkes mit Mandeln in ‚Ulrike Hessler Errinerungen’, in Semper Nr. 2, 2012-2013
- Eytan Pessen, Heart in the south (in German) (of Hans Werner Henze) in Semper Nr.3, p. 51,2012-2013

== You Tube Links ==
- Cilea, Giorgio Berrugi, Wigmore Hall
- Alban Berg, Op. 2, Christa Mayer, Semperoper Dresden
- Robert Schumann, Der Einsiedler, with tenor Maciej Kwaśnikowski
- Franz Liszt, three songs, with Baritone Pavol Kuban, Semperoper Dresden
- Gaspare Spontini, Mignon, with Emily Dorn, Semperoper Dresden
- Wagner Lieder, Markus Marquardt, Semperoper Dresden
- Richard Strauss, Morgen, Carolina Ullrich, Semperoper Dresden
- Rachmaninoff, Andrej Dunaev, Semperoper Dresden
- Respighi, Giorgio Berrugi Wigmore Hall
- Gliere, Danylo Matviienko, Warsaw, Teatr Wielki

Yiddish

- Unter Beymer, Yiddish song, with Motti Kaston, Esslingen
- Eynzam, Yiddish, with Mateusz Hoedt, Warsaw Teatr Wielki
- Yankele, with Marcjanna Myrlak, Warsaw, Teatr Wielki
- Rozhinkas mit Mandlen, with Christoph Pohl, Semperoper

Folk

- Rumanian Christmas Carol, With Roxana Incontrera, Semperoper Dresden
- Al la una yo naci, Giorgio Berrugi, Wigmore Hall
