= Juanita Lascarro =

Colombian opera singer

- Born: Bogotá, Colombia
- Education: Hochschule für Musik und Tanz, Köln
- Occupation: Operatic soprano
- Organizations: Oper Frankfurt
- Website: www.juanita-lascarro.de

Juanita Lascarro is a Colombian soprano in opera and concert, and a voice teacher. She began her career in Europe in the title role of Daphne by Richard Strauss at several houses. Based at Oper Frankfurt, she has performed leading roles at major opera houses. She performed the title role of Martinů's Julietta, which was recorded. In 2022, she appeared as both Calypso and Penelope in a new production of Dallapiccola's Ulisse.

== Career ==
Lascarro was born in Colombia and studied at the Conservatoire of Bogota. She made her debut in Europe in the title role of Daphne by Richard Strauss when the opera was first performed in the UK at the Garsington Opera. She repeated the role at the Deutsche Oper Berlin conducted by Christian Thielemann, at the Nederlaandse Opera conducted by Ingo Metzmacher, at the Oper Frankfurt conducted by Sebastian Weigle, and at the Concertgebouw in Amsterdam conducted by Edo de Waart.

She became a member of the Oper Frankfurt where she performed roles such as Mozart's Susanna and Contessa in Le nozze di Figaro, Elvira in Don Giovanni, Pamina in Die Zauberflöte, Ninetta in Rossini's La gazza ladra, the title role of Verdi's La traviata, Antonia in Offenbach's Les contes d'Hoffmann and Puccini's Suor Angelica, and the title role of Alban Berg's Lulu, among others. In 2003, a reviewer from Der Tagesspiegel noted that she was a convincing singer-actress who portrayed Lulu as a person void of character becoming a victim of her surroundings, singing with a seemingly innocent soprano voice. When she appeared in the title role of Martinů's Julietta in a production sung in German in 2015, conducted by Sebastian Weigle, the performance was recorded. In 2022, she appeared as both Calypso and Penelope in a new production of Dallapiccola's Ulisse alongside Iain MacNeal in the title role, directed by Tatjana Gürbaca and conducted by Francesco Lanzillotta.
