= Giorgio Berrugi =

Italian operatic tenor

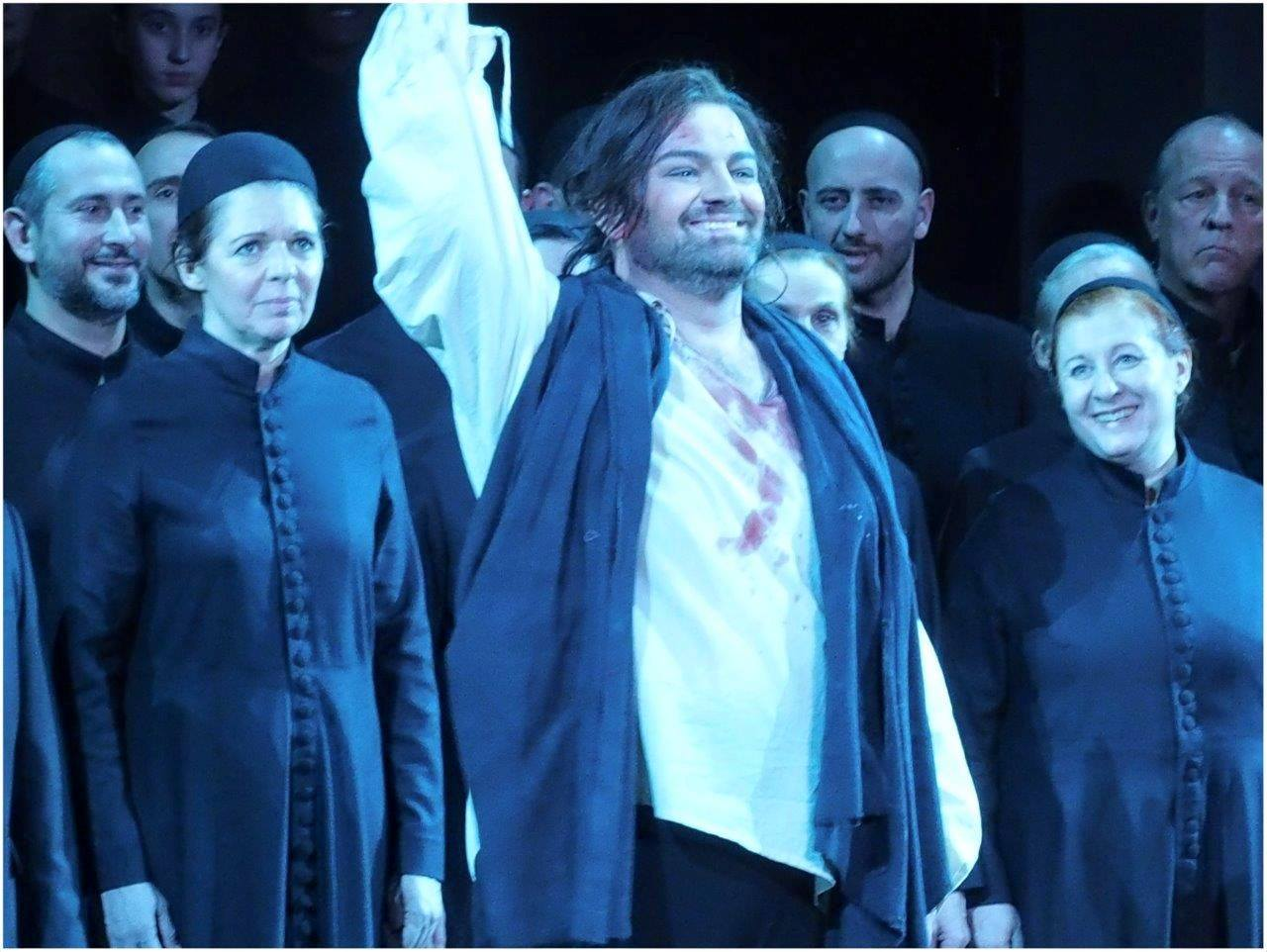
- Giorgio Berrugi
- Born: Giorgio Berrugi; 29 July 1977 (age 49); Pisa, Italy
- Occupation: Opera singer (tenor)
- Years active: 2010–present
- Website: www.giorgioberrugi.com

Giorgio Berrugi is an Italian operatic tenor.

== Musical education ==
Born in Pisa, Italy, Berrugi was a clarinetist, graduating summa cum laude from the Istituto “Mascagni” of Livorno. Further studies at the Accademia teatro alla scala (course for professional orchestral musicians), the Accademia di Imola for chamber music, and the Scuola di Musica di Fiesole, where he was awarded the Premio Lucchesini. Berrugi was winner of several international prizes both as a solo clarinetist and as a member of the Alban Berg Duo, including first prizes at the Rome(2002) and Bologna international chamber music competitions. In 2002 he won the Solo Clarinet chair of the Orchestra Sinfonica di Roma, which he held until 2006.

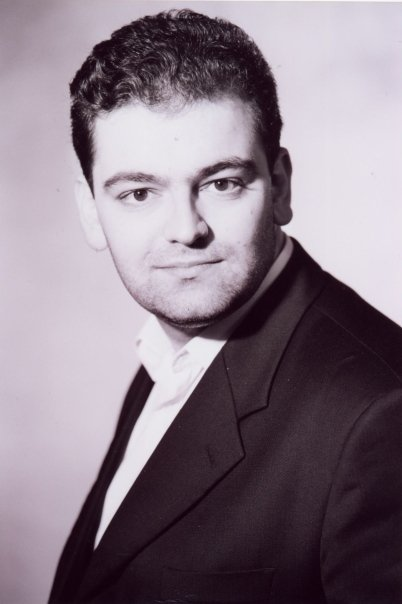
Berrugi

== Vocal education ==
In 2007 Berrugi started private vocal instruction with La Scala baritone Carlo Meliciani. He made his operatic debut at the Venice Teatro La Fenice as Rodolfo in La bohème in 2008. Further vocal studies followed with Francisco Araiza and with pianist Eytan Pessen, with whom he has also performed a recital at the Ian Rosenblatt Recital Series at Wigmore Hall.

== Career ==
In 2010 Giorgio Berrugi was invited by opera director Eytan Pessen to the ensemble of the Dresden Semperoper where he stayed until 2013; with that company he debuted roles including Don José in Carmen, Riccardo in Un ballo in maschera, Mario Cavaradossi in Tosca, Nemorino in L’elisir d’amore, Duca di Mantova in Rigoletto, and Gennarino in the world première of Hans Werner Henze‘s Gisela!.

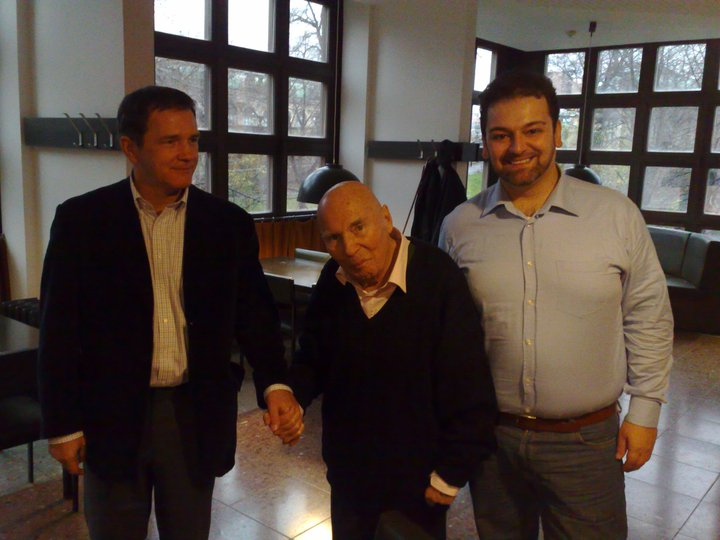
Giorgio Berrugi with Composer Hans Werner Henze and co-librettist Michael Kerstan during rehearsals for the World premiere of the Dresden version of Gisela!

Berrugi's Dresden years propelled him to an international career. Since 2013 Berrugi has performed in opera theatres and festivals all over the world. In Italy he has performed at the Teatro La Scala (Verdi Requiem and Simon Boccanegra), the Teatro Massimo di Palermo (Rodolfo, Edgardo), the Teatro Regio (Turin) (Tamino, Rodolfo, Edgardo), the Teatro Verdi di Salerno (Rodolfo), the Arena di Verona Festival (Roméo, Pinkerton, Ismaele in Nabucco), the Teatro di San Carlo (Nemorino, Rodolfo in Luisa Miller), the Teatro Municipale di Piacenza (Hoffmann). Berrugi also performs frequently with the Italian soprano Maria Agresta.

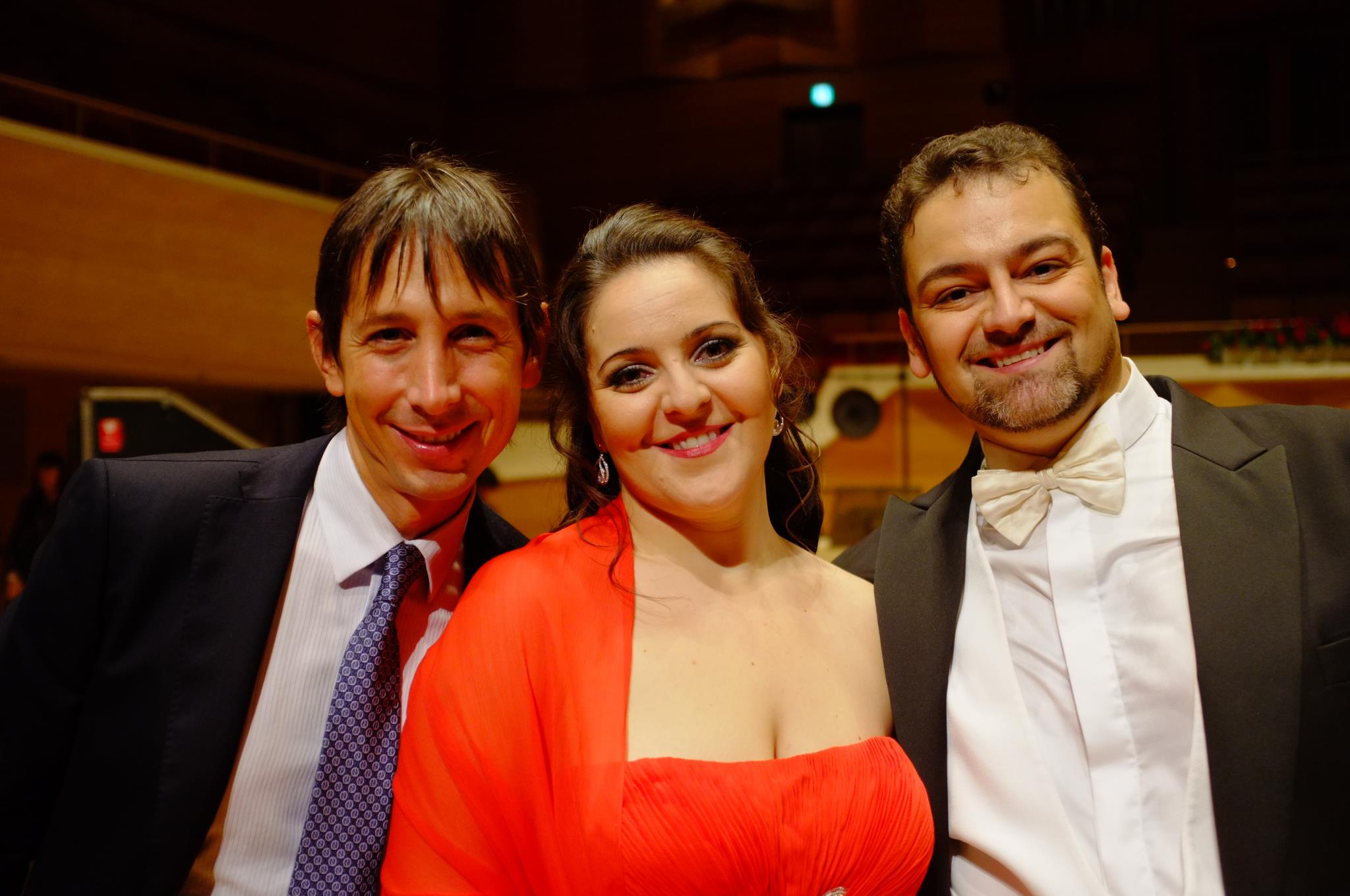
Berrugi, Agresta, Macheda

International appearances include the San Francisco Opera (Rodolfo), the Deutsche Oper Berlin (Rodolfo), the Opéra de Marseille (Cavaradossi), Oviedo (Rodolfo), Lucerne (Verdi Requiem), the Théâtre des Champs-Élysées (Verdi Requiem), the Gewandhaus, Suntory Hall, Japan, Wigmore Hall, London, the Concertgebouw in Amsterdam, (Cavaradossi), and the Savonlinna Opera Festival (Pinkerton).

== Conductors ==
Berrugi has collaborated with prominent conductors including Zubin Mehta, Daniel Oren, Christian Thielemann, Fabio Luisi, Gustavo Dudamel, Pinchas Steinberg, Nicola Luisotti, Myung-whun Chung, and Jaap van Zweden.

== Vocal and artistic characteristics ==
Mentioned by Placido Domingo as one of his vocal successors, Berrugi’s voice has been described as a tenor of radiant, honeyed color, "clear bright tone" and typically Italianate timbre, contributing to his association with the tenor roles of Puccini and Verdi, but he has performed numerous French roles and sings a varied repertoire including modern works by Henze and others.

== Personal life ==
Giorgio Berrugi is married and has a son.

== Repertoire ==
=== Operatic Roles ===
Composer	Opera	Role	Where performed
Puccini	La bohème	Rodolfo	Teatro La Fenice, Semperoper Dresden, Staatsoper Hamburg, San Francisco Opera, New Israeli Opera Tel Aviv, Teatro Massimo di Palermo, Teatro di San Carlo Napoli, Teatro Verdi di Salerno, Ópera de Oviedo, Deutsche Oper Berlin (2016), Lyric Opera of Kansas City, Teatro Regio di Torino
Puccini	Tosca	Cavaradossi	Semperoper Dresden, Opéra de Marseille, Teatro del Giglio Lucca, Concertgebouw Amsterdam
Puccini	Madama Butterfly	Pinkerton	Arena di Verona, Savonlinna Opera Festival, Semperoper Dresden
Verdi	Un ballo in maschera	Rodolfo	Semperoper Dresden
Verdi	Simon Boccanegra	Gabriele Adorno	Semperoper Dresden, Teatro alla Scala (2016), Teatro Regio di Torino (Hong Kong tour 2016)
Verdi	La traviata	Alfredo	Seoul Arts Center, Oper Leipzig, New Israeli Opera Tel Aviv
Verdi	Luisa Miller	Rodolfo	Semperoper Dresden, Teatro di San Carlo
Verdi	Macbeth	Macduff	Palau de les Arts Reina Sofía, Semperoper Dresden
Verdi	Rigoletto	Duca di Mantova	Semperoper Dresden, Teatro alla Scala (tour to NHK Hall Tokyo)
Verdi	Nabucco	Ismaele	Arena di Verona
Verdi	Ernani	Ernani	North Carolina Opera
R. Strauss	Der Rosenkavalier	Italian Tenor	Royal Opera House Covent Garden (2016)
R. Strauss	Capriccio	Ein italienischer Sänger	Semperoper Dresden
Mozart	Die Zauberflöte	Tamino	Teatro Regio di Torino
Donizetti	Lucia di Lammermoor	Edgardo	Teatro Massimo di Palermo, Teatro Regio di Torino
Donizetti	L'elisir d'amore	Nemorino	Semperoper Dresden, Teatro di San Carlo, Teatro del Maggio Musicale Fiorentino
Bizet	Carmen	Don José	Semperoper Dresden
Gounod	Roméo et Juliette	Roméo	Arena di Verona
Berlioz	La damnation de Faust	Faust	Budapest Bela Bartok National Concert Hall
Offenbach	Les contes d'Hoffmann	Hoffmann	Teatro Municipale di Piacenza, Teatro Comunale di Modena, Teatro Valli di Reggio Emilia
Henze	Gisela!	Gennarino	Semperoper Dresden

=== Concert Repertoire ===
Composer	Work	Role	Venues
Puccini	Messa di Gloria	solo tenor	MDR Leipzig
Verdi	Messa da Requiem	solo tenor	Teatro alla Scala, Palau de les arts Valencia, Maggio Musicale Fiorentino, Théâtre des Champs-Élysées Paris, Accademia di Santa Cecilia, Teatro Massimo di Palermo, Hallé Manchester, Luzern Konzertsaal, Dallas Meyerson Symphony Center, Cesis Concert Hall Latvia, Teatro Regio di Torino (Hong Kong Tour 2016)
