= Kang Wang =

Kang Wang may refer to:

- Kang L. Wang (born 1941), Taiwanese nanotechnologist
- Kang Wang (opera singer) (born 1988), Australian-Chinese operatic tenor

== See also ==
- Wang Kang (footballer, born 2006), Chinese footballer
