= Danylo Matviienko =

Ukrainian opera baritone (born 1990)

- Born: 1990 (age 35–36); Novy Svit, Ukrainian SSR
- Occupation: Operatic baritone
- Organizations: Oper Frankfurt

Danylo Matviienko (born 1990) is a Ukrainian operatic baritone who has performed leading roles at major opera houses in Europe. He began working at the Oper Frankfurt in 2021.

== Career ==
Matviienko was born in Novy Svit in 1990. He studied mathematics at the National University of Donetsk, graduating with a master's degree. He studied singing at the Academy of Music in Donetsk with Petro Onchul, completing with a Bachelor of Arts in 2007, and at the National Music Academy of Ukraine with Alexander Diachenko, where he graduated as a Master of Arts in 2014. He became a member of the opera studio of the National Opera in Warsaw, studying with Eytan Pessen, and took masterclasses of Izabela Kłosińska, Matthias Rexroth and Neil Shicoff. From 2017, Matviienko was a member of the opera studio of the Paris Opera, where his roles included Dr. Falke in Die Fledermaus by Johann Strauss. In 2018, he was a finalist of the Queen Elisabeth Competition in Brussels.

In concert, he performed mostly in Ukraine and Poland, including Bach's Magnificat, and the cantatas Meine Seel erhebt den Herren, BWV 10, and Herz und Mund und Tat und Leben, BWV 147, at the Donbas Opera, Handel's Messiah with the Kyiv Symphony Orchestra and Choir, Duruflé's Requiem with the chamber choir Sofia from Kyiv, and Sviridov's Pesni bezvremenya with the choir of the Kyiv Conservatory.

Matviienko became a member of the Oper Frankfurt with the 2021/22 season, where he performed roles such as Guglielmo in Mozart's Così fan tutte and Demetrius in Britten's A Midsummer Night's Dream. In a 2022 new production of Dallapiccola's Ulisse, directed by Tatjana Gürbaca and conducted by Francesco Lanzillotta, he appeared as Antinoos, one of Penelope's suitors.
