= Teatro Massimo =

Opera house in Palermo, Italy

Coordinates: 38°07′13″N 13°21′26″E

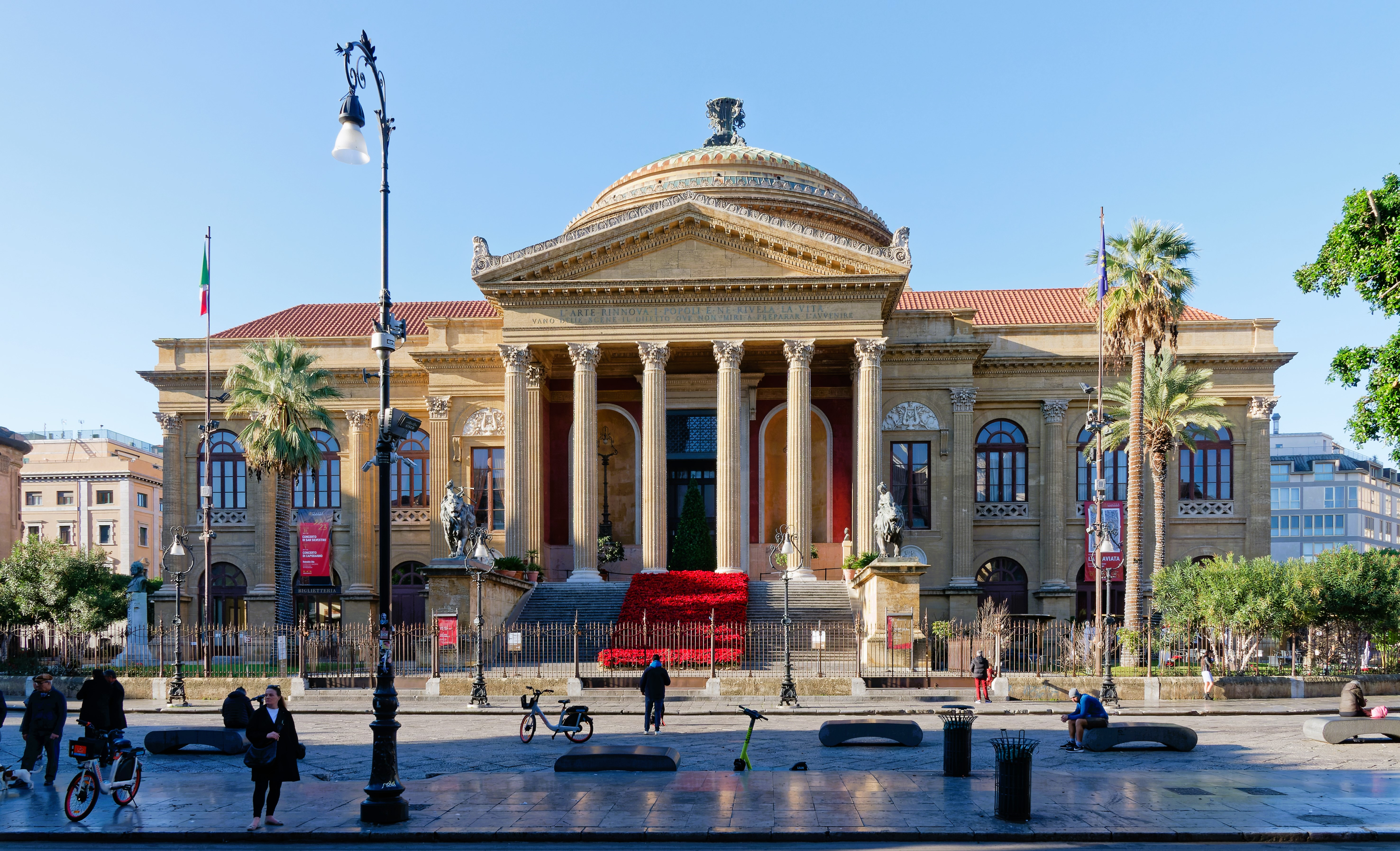
- Teatro Massimo
- Interactive map of Teatro Massimo
- Address: Piazza Verdi; Palermo; Italy
- Owner: Comune di Palermo
- Capacity: 1,387

Construction
- Opened: 1897
- Architects: Giovanni Battista Filippo Basile (1874–1880), Ernesto Basile (1891–1897)

Website
- http://www.teatromassimo.it/

The Teatro Massimo Vittorio Emanuele is an opera house and opera company located on the Piazza Verdi in Palermo, Sicily. It was dedicated to King Victor Emanuel II. It is the biggest in Italy, and one of the largest of Europe (at the time of its inauguration, it was - with its area of 7,730 square metres (83,200 sq ft) - the third largest opera house in Europe after the Palais Garnier in Paris, and the K. K. Hof-Opernhaus in Vienna), renowned for its perfect acoustics.

== Construction and opening ==
An international competition for the creation of the opera house was announced by the Palermo Council in 1864 at the instigation of the mayor, Antonio Starrabba di Rudinì. For many years there had been talk of building a large new theatre in Palermo, worthy of the second biggest city in southern Italy (after Naples) and designed to promote the image of the city following the unification of Italy in 1861.

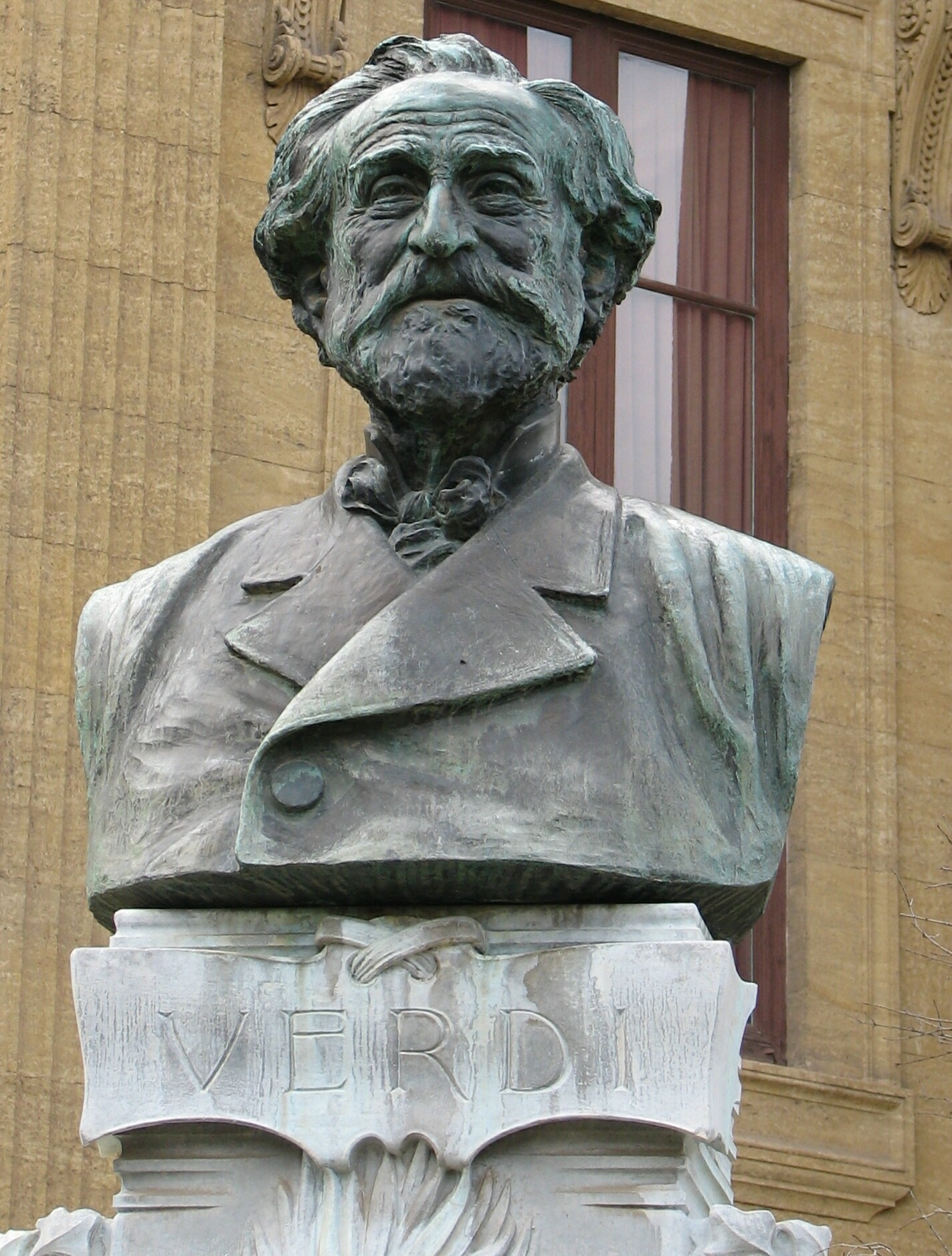
Bust of Giuseppe Verdi outside of the Teatro Massimo

The opera house was designed, and overseen by the Italian architect Giovan Battista Filippo Basile, who was well known in Sicily for his previous cathedral restoration design in the city of Acireale, as well as garden and villa designs in the city of Palermo and Caltagirone. Following G. B. F. Basile's death in 1891, construction was then overseen by his son, Architect Ernesto Basile.

The Rutelli and Machì Company, represented by Giovanni Rutelli and Alberto Machì (both founding members of the company) was contracted for the main construction of the theatre which, under Architect Giovanni Rutelli's technical and building direction, went from the foundations all the way up to the theatre's attic structures. He was also responsible for all the external decorations of the building. Rutelli initially designed a steam tower crane machine which was then successfully able to lift large stone blocks and Greek/Roman styled columns during construction of the very large theatre.

Mario Rutelli's father, Giovanni Rutelli, was a building contractor and co-owner of the firm Rutelli e Machì, which won the building contract for the theatre; the family had a multi-generational tradition of building and stone-working in Palermo. The exterior flight of steps is adorned with large bronze groups by native sculptors: to the left, Lyric Poetry and a lion by Mario Rutelli, to the right, Tragedy and a lion by Benedetto Civiletti.

Construction started on 12 January 1874, but was stopped for eight years from 1882 until 1890. Finally, on 16 May 1897, twenty-two years after the laying of the foundation stone, the third largest opera house in Europe at the time — after the Palais Garnier in Paris, and the K. K. Hof-Opernhaus in Vienna— was inaugurated with a performance of Verdi's Falstaff conducted by Leopoldo Mugnone.

The interior is decorated and painted by Rocco Lentini, Ettore De Maria Bergler, Michele Cortegiani and Luigi Di Giovanni.

Busts of famous composers were carved for the theatre by the Italian sculptor, Giusto Liva (born in Montebelluna, Treviso in 1847) and several of his sons.

== Facilities and recent history ==
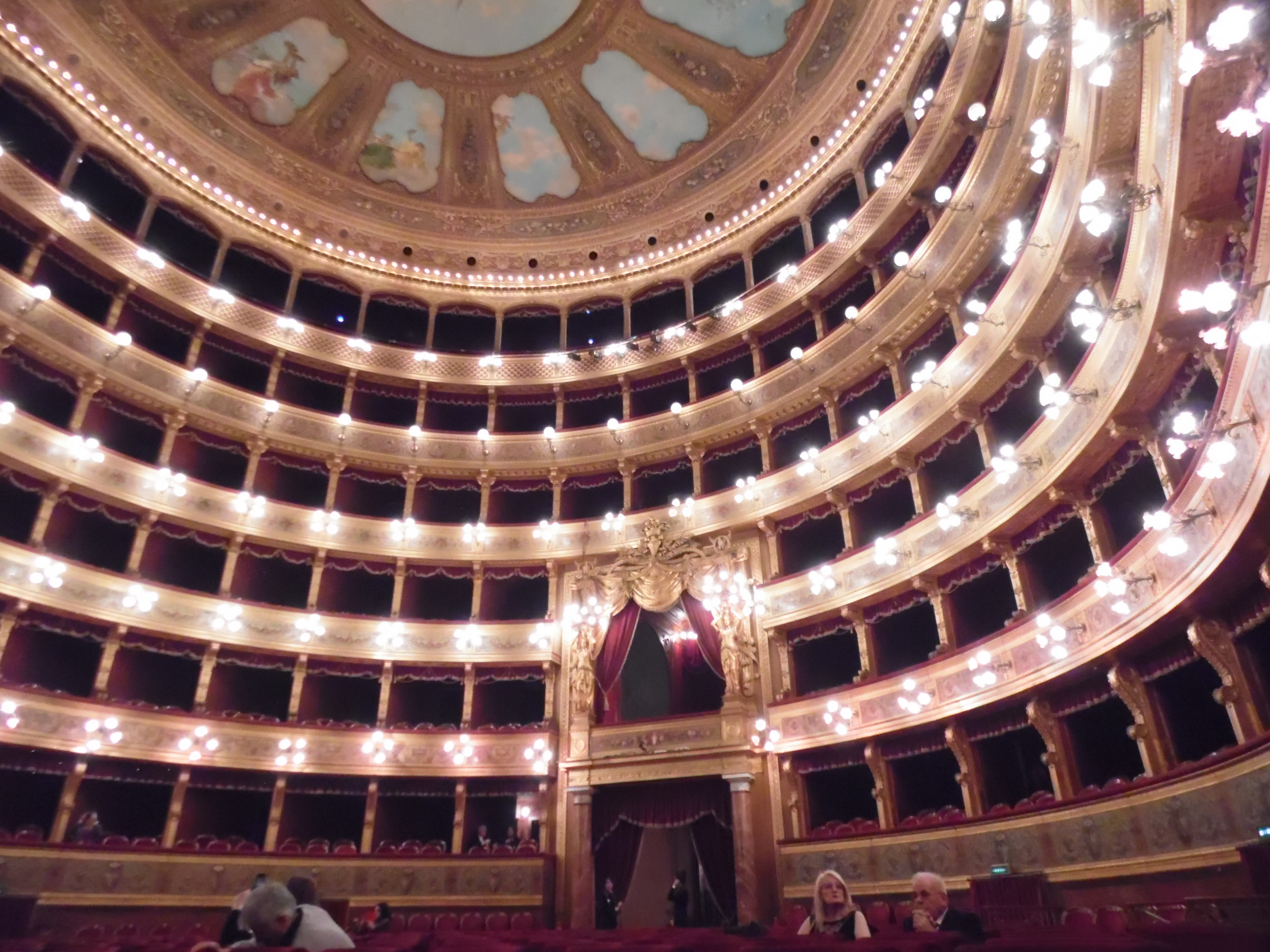
Interior view of the Teatro Massimo

The Teatro Massimo is the largest theatre in Italy. Basile was inspired by ancient and classical Sicilian architecture and, thus, the exterior was designed in the high neoclassical style incorporating elements of the Greek temples at Selinunte and Agrigento. Realized in the late-Renaissance style, the auditorium was planned for 3,000 people, but, in its current format, it seats 1,381, with 7 tiers of boxes rising up around an inclined stage, and shaped in the typical horseshoe style.

In 1974, the house was closed to complete renovations required by updated safety regulations, but cost over-runs, corruption, and political in-fighting all added to the delay and it remained closed for twenty-three years, finally re-opening on 12 May 1997, four days before its centenary. The opera season started again in 1999, although Verdi's Aida was performed in 1998 while work in progress continued.

During the restoration regular opera seasons were performed in Teatro Politeama, a minor building not far from Teatro Massimo. In summer a few performances, usually concerts, ballet and operetta, are held in Teatro della Verdura.

In recent years, "charges of corruption and political meddling…along with budget deficits and heavy debts" have plagued the house, but, under its then part-English music director, Jan Latham Koenig, it was reported that it is once again on track.

2013-2014 was a two-year hiatus under the leadership of the comissario straordinario Fabio Carapezza Guttuso, who brought in Lorenzo Amato and Eytan Pessen as artistic advisors. Under Carapezza Guttuso's leadership the theatre offered a varied programme including Richard Strauss's Feuersnot, Hans Werner Henze's Gisela!, Jaromir Weinberger's Schwanda the bagpiper and an increased ballet activity. The current intendant is the experienced Francesco Giambrone. From 2020 the music director has been Omer Meir Wellber. He replaced Gabriele Ferro, who is now honorary life director.

== Media interest ==
The final scenes of Francis Ford Coppola's film The Godfather Part III (1990) were filmed at the theatre, where Coppola's uncle, composer and conductor Anton Coppola, is shown conducting the opera Cavalleria rusticana.

In the second season of The White Lotus, Quentin (Tom Hollander) takes Tanya (Jennifer Coolidge) to see a performance of Madama Butterfly at the Teatro Massimo.
