= McNaron =

McNaron is a surname. Notable people with the surname include:

- Diane McNaron (born 1947), American singer, producer, and Cabaret entertainer
- Toni McNaron (born 1937), American literary scholar and lesbian memoirist
