= Rocco Lentini =

Italian painter (1858–1943)

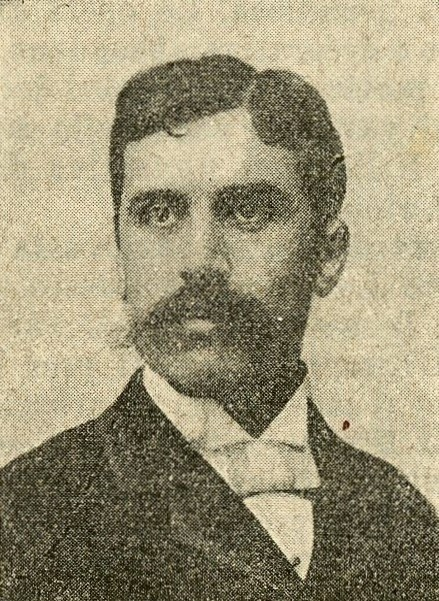
- Born: 1858; Palermo, Italy
- Died: November 1943 (aged 84–85); Venice, Italy
- Education: Bologna; Paris
- Known for: Painter
- Notable work: Ceiling decoration of the Teatro Massimo, Palermo

Rocco Lentini (1858 – November 1943) was an Italian painter, noted for directing the team responsible for the ceiling decorations of the Teatro Massimo in Palermo.

== Biography ==
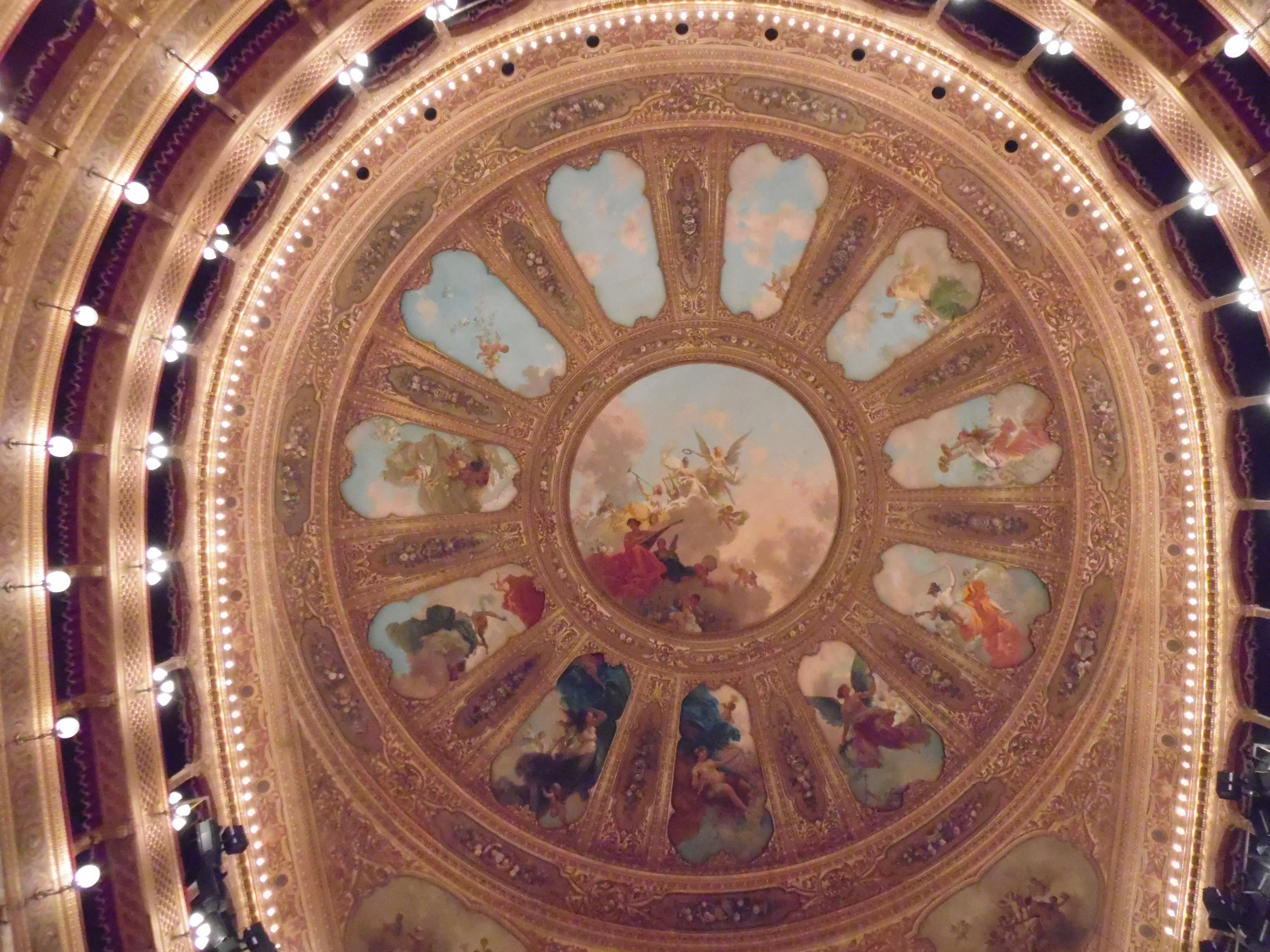
Interior of Teatro Massimo (Palermo)

Rocco Lentini was born in Palermo in 1858 and died in Venice in 1943. His father, a scenographer, was his first master. He won as scholarship from the community to study at Bologna, then to Paris. He exhibited in the Paris Salon of 1879 and in the 1878 Promotrice of Turin.

He painted Genre and landscapes in watercolor and tempera. He also studied scenography. His landscapes feature vistas and places in Sicily. He also painted historical canvases, including The disembarkation of Garibaldi at Marsala. In the late 1880s, he was commissioned to paint frescoes for the Villa Malfitano Whitaker in Palermo.

Between 1893 and 1897, he led a team of artists responsible for the ceiling decoration of the Teatro Massimo of Palermo. The team consisted of Luigi Di Giovanni, Michele Cortegiani and Ettore De Maria Bergler. Lentini's concept for the ceiling (pictured) was that of a large wheel with gilded spokes which would contrast with the azure background. Within each spoke, (panels known as petals) feature angels and female figures with musical instruments painted on canvas, while the centrepiece was an allegory of the 'Triumph of Music'.

In 1884, he won a stipend to attend the Brera Academy, and stayed in Milan for some years. He returned to teach and paint in Palermo. He published two educational books Elementi di Ornato (1892) and Elementi di Paesaggio. In 1911, in collaboration with Ernesto Basile, he published the book titled Le sculture e gli stucchi di Giacomo Serpotta. He organized and exhibited the Mostra Siciliana di Pittura, Scultura, Bianco e nero, held at Villa Gallidoro. He was editor and owner of the monthly journal "La Sicilia Artistica e Archeologica". he traveled frequently to Germany, North Italy, and Venice, participating in two Biennali, 1905 and 1922.

In the 1930s, he carried out restoration work on the Moorish Palazzo Cuba of Palermo.
