= Michele Cortegiani =

Italian painter (1857–1928)

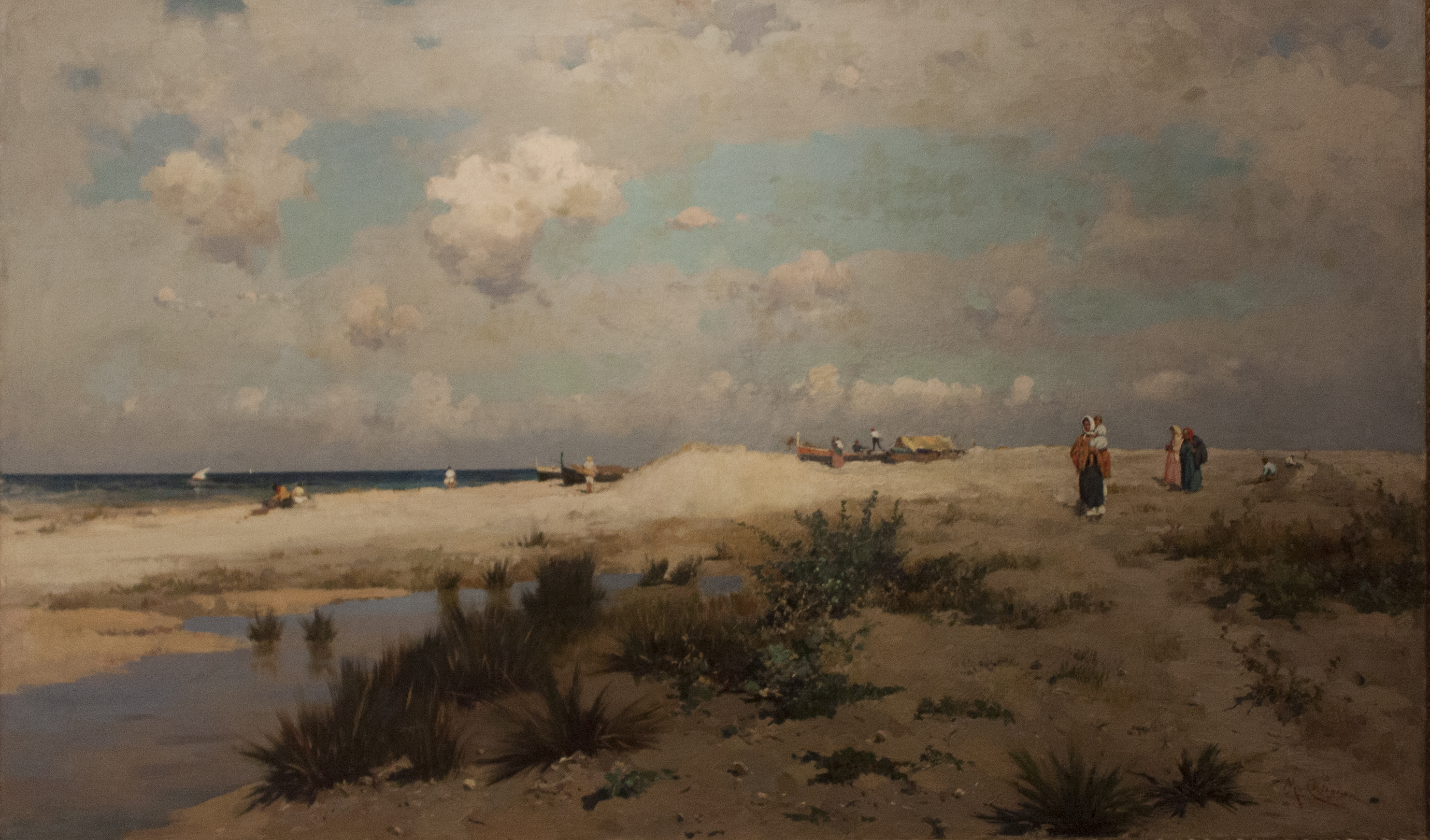
- Isola delle Femmine, painting by Michele Cortegiani, 1884
- Born: 8 February 1857; Palermo, Kingdom of the Two Sicilies
- Died: 1928 (aged 70–71); Tunisia
- Education: Francesco Lojacono
- Known for: Painter
- Movement: Orientalist

Michele Cortegiani (Palermo, 8 February 1857 - Tunisia, 1928) was an Italian painter, mainly of seascapes of his native Sicily and later Tunisia, and of female portraits and genre subjects.

== Biography ==
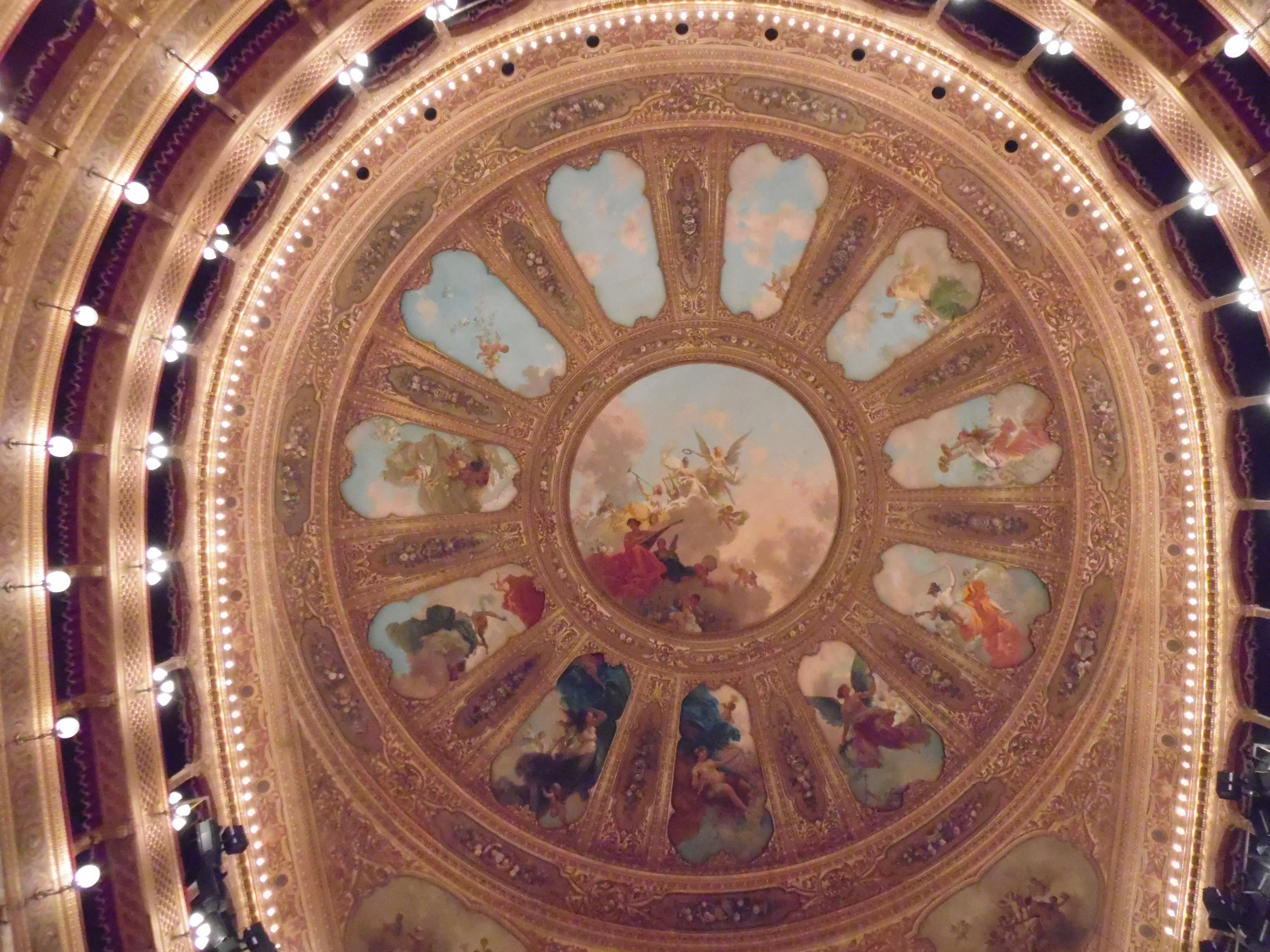
Interior of Teatro Massimo (Palermo)

He trained with Francesco Lojacono, moving with him to Paris in 1877–1881.

He assisted with the ceiling decoration (1893-1897) of the Teatro Massimo of Palermo, where he worked alongside Luigi Di Giovanni and Ettore De Maria Bergler, working under the direction of Rocco Lentini. Lentini's concept for the ceiling (pictured) was that of a large wheel with gilded spokes which would contrast with the azure background. Within each spoke, (panels known as petals) feature angels and female figures with musical instruments painted on canvas, while the centrepiece was an allegory of the 'Triumph of Music'.

In later years, he worked in Tunisia, and in Sicily, along with Lojacono, Michele Catti and other painters of their school, where the group became known as the "masters of colour" because of the way they captured the light of the marinas and sleepy villages of Sicily.

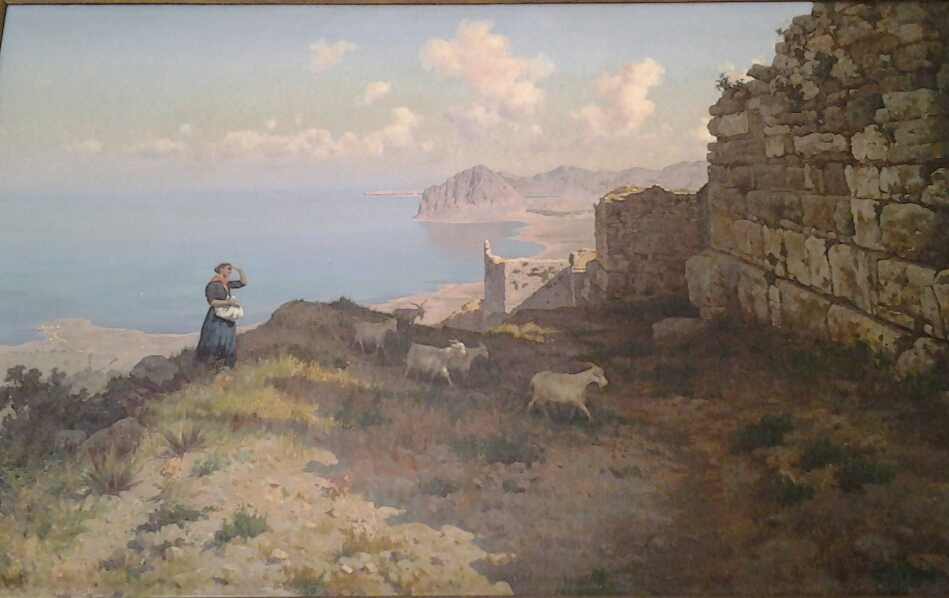
Phoenician walls of Erice

== See also ==
- List of Orientalist artists
- Orientalism
