= Dina Turgeman =

German-born Israeli pianist

- דינה תורג'מן
- Born: Dina Grossvogel; October 4, 1922; Frankfurt, Germany
- Died: February 14, 2014 (aged 91); Israel
- Occupations: Pianist, piano teacher
- Known for: Concert performances, unique piano teaching method
- Spouse: Mordechai Turgeman
- Children: 2, including Orit Pappo
- Awards: Chamber music competition at the Jerusalem Music Academy named in her honor

Dina Turgeman (Hebrew: דינה תורג'מן; 4 October 1922 – 14 February 2014), was a German-born Israeli pianist and piano teacher.

== Biography ==
Dina Grossvogel Turgeman was born in Frankfurt, Germany. Her Polish-born art dealer family emigrated to Luxembourg. She studied piano at the Luxembourg Conservatory, with Lucien Lambotte, and at age 14 won „Premier prix avec grande distinction par 60 points“, (“first prize with distinction”). A year later, February 24, 1938, she gave her first recital at the Luxemburg Casino playing works of Glinka, Balakirew, Ljadow, Glasunow and Arenski.

She went on to the Royal Conservatory of Brussels where she won „Premier prix avec distinction“ (First prize with distinction) in 1939. She won first prizes in competitions and played in concerts that were broadcast across Europe. During her studies she received the honor of Queen of Belgium's patronage. During the Second World War in 1941, her family was on the list to be deported to the Litzmannstadt Ghetto (Łódź), Turgeman and her family, with forged papers under the name ‘Dubois’ and assisted by Lucien Lambotte, hid in a convent near Liege in Belgium, where she played the organ at Mass every morning.

After the war she continued with her studies at the Brussels conservatoire, and played numerous concerts, as soloist and chamber music, in Brussels and for the Luxembourg radio.

In 1949, she immigrated to Israel.

In 1950, she married Mordechai Turgeman, CPA, whom she met touring in Israel. They have two children, Professor Orit Pappo and Advocate Arik Ramot.

== Music career ==
Turgeman played as soloist and chamber music with musicians from Israel and abroad including Yitzhak Blassberger, Simcha Cheled, Georg Marton, Avraham Melamed, Nahum Pinczuk, Meir Rimon, Moshe Stieglitz, Arie Yisraeli in a wide repertoire which included Bach, Beethoven, Brahms, Britten, Chausson, Kodaly, Martinu Mozart, Partos, Poot, Tchaikowski, Villa-Lobos as well as Belgian composers. She taught students from all over the world who went on to Juilliard, the Metropolitan Opera and other musical institutions.

Turgeman developed a unique teaching method that allowed musicians to reach their full potential, with a specific technical base (summarized in Baltsan's dissertation) of rebuilding the finger strength and efficient easy playing. Among her students were Astrith Baltsan, Leora Cohen, Mikael Eliason, Ethan Globerson, Revital Hachamoff, Yehuda Inbar, Nico Levi, Eytan Pessen, Irit Rimon Neidorff, Ayala Rosenbaum, Adi Rosenkranz, Zvi Semel and Michal Tal. She taught up to the age of 88.

== Awards and recognition ==
After her death in 2014 at the age of 91 the story of her curtailed career, deportation and post war antisemitism were featured in varied media in Luxembourg and Belgium. led by the historian Denis Scuto. the Jerusalem Music Academy created a chamber music competition on her name.

== See also ==
- Music in Israel
