= Diane McNaron =

American musical artist (1947–2022)

- Born: 1947; Texas, United States
- Died: 2022 (aged 74–75); Birmingham, Alabama
- Occupation(s): Singer, producer and Cabaret entertainer
- Website: dianemcnaron.com

Diane McNaron (born 1947 in Texas, died February 20, 2022) was an American singer, producer and Cabaret entertainer. She worked as a stage director and cabaret, art song, opera and jazz singer throughout the US and in Europe, Venezuela and Australia.

== Career ==
McNaron attended Woodlawn High School. She studied Opera Production at Florida State University from which she received a Master of Music degree in 1973, and post graduate work at Indiana University School of Music with Ross Allen, Max Roethlissberger and Hans Busch. As a singer, she coached with Eleanor Steber in New York, Frau Professor Ena Thiessen at the American Institute of Musical Studies in Graz, Austria, Metropolitan Opera soprano Gianna d'Angelo and with the Kurt Weill repertoire coaches Randolph Symonette and Lys Symonette. She served as an Assistant Director for the Opera Barga Festival in Italy, studying stage direction with Gino Becchi in 1977.

She worked as a voice professor and theatrical stage director at several universities and colleges including Northern Arizona University, Northwestern State University of Louisiana and the University of Adelaide. Australia, from 1978 to 1988. On her return to the US, McNaron became a free-lance singer in the fields of Jazz, Cabaret and Art Song, a cabaret producer/director and voice coach. During 1991, she created the Cabaret duo, Masters’ Cabaret, showcasing songs of Lotte Lenya and Marlene Dietrich. In 2000, she released the CD Music in Flight featuring pianist Shari Boruvka and the works of Kurt Weill, Hanns Eisler, Paul Dessau, LaDonna Smith and Ed Robertson, written while the European composers were in flight from war and political oppression. The album was endorsed by Doctors Without Borders (MSF), winners of the 1999 Nobel Peace Prize.

In 2004, McNaron launched the ensemble, The Politically Incorrect Cabaret, a twelve-member troupe of writers, singer/actors, dancers and instrumentalists, presenting topical political satire in a Berlin-style setting. The troupe plays across the Southeast. Her CD Rosas de Pulpa; Rosas de Cal, recorded with the pianist Heather Coltman, pianist Adam Bowles, violinist Karen Bentley Pollick, violist Melanie Richardson Rodgers and cellist Craig Hultgren featuring the compositions of Valdo Sciammarella, was released in 2010.

McNaron was a founding member of the Birmingham Peace Project of which she became Chair in 2009. She produced rallies, fund-raisers and teach-ins for progressive and charitable organizations and resided in Birmingham, Alabama.

== Discography ==
- Music In Flight with Shari Boruvka, Laurie Middaugh, Judith Donaldson, LaDonna Smith and the Indian Springs School Women’s Chorale, 2000
- Rosas de Pulpa, Rosas de Cal – the Music of Valdo Sciammarella, with Heather Coltman, Adam Bowles, Karen Bentley Pollick, Melanie Richardson Rodgers and Craig Hultgren, 2010
