= Alberta Masiello =

American opera singer

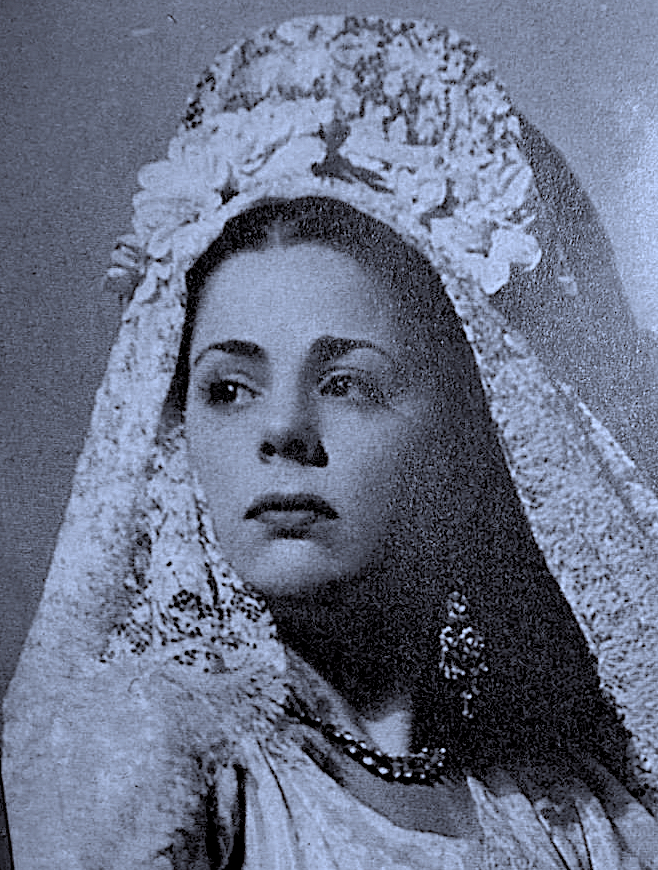
- Alberta Masiello in operatic costume

Background information
- Born: 20 November 1915; Milan, Italy
- Died: 25 December 1990 (aged 75) New York
- Genres: Classical
- Instruments: Piano, Voice
- Years active: 1932–1989

Alberta Masiello (20 November 1915 – 25 December 1990), was an assistant-conductor and opera coach at the Metropolitan Opera; a panelist in the Saturday afternoon Metropolitan Opera Quiz on the Metropolitan Opera radio broadcasts, and teacher at the Juilliard School and at Mannes School of Music.

== Family ==
Alberta Masiello was born in Milan, Italy. Her grandfather Giuseppe La Puma (1870–1940), was a Basso buffo opera singer who created the role of Cornelius in the world premiere of Pietro Mascagni’s opera Isabeau (1911). La Puma also founded the Mascagni Centre of Culture. Giuseppe La Puma's daughter (Masiello's mother), was Giuseppina La Puma, who moved to New York in 1933 with Masiello. La Puma became impresario and changed her name to Josephine La Puma. Her 'La Puma Opera Workshop' in New York was an alternative to the established mainstream opera companies in the city, providing young artists, including Alberta Masiello, with professional opportunities. Alberta Masiello's father was the opera singer Ottavio Masiello.

== Life ==
Alberta Masiello studied singing with Fernanda Rapisardi in Milan, and piano with Renzo Lorenzoni at the Milan Conservatory, (Conservatorio di musica "Giuseppe Verdi" di Milano), with a diploma, 1932 and at The Juilliard School. Ernest Hutcheson, the president of Juilliard, took an interest in Masiello and helped her start a career as a pianist. After graduating from Juilliard, Masiello studied voice with Paul Althouse, Désiré Defrère, and Mme. Anna Schön-René.

Margaret Mara describes Masiello in 1932 as "simple, unaffected in manner. Tall, lithesome, brown haired. Her dark eyes are eloquent as are her graceful hands which flutter expressively as she talks. She has not yet mastered our language and many times during our visit she called upon her mother for conversational assistance. For her mother has had eight years of residence in the United States while Alberta stayed in Milan with her maternal grandmother to finish her studies."

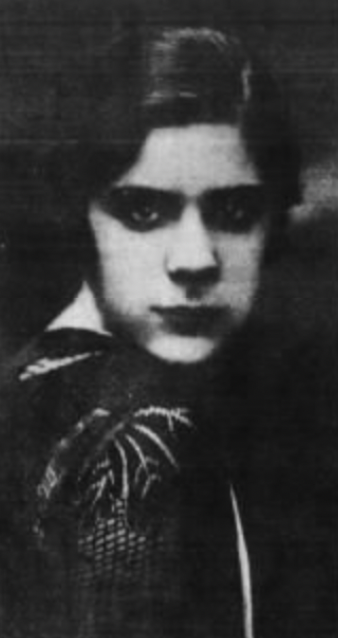
Publicity photo of Mezzo Soprano Alberta Masiello in 1932

In 1934 Masiello worked as part of a twelve piano ensemble billed as the "twelve Grands" in Radio City music hall. She later performed using her married name, Alberta Masiello Bosco. Numerous recitals as pianist and accompanist, an activity spanning from 1939 when she performed at the White House, performances in Carnegie hall as well as recordings and broadcasts with singers till the 70s. Her husband, Joseph Bosco, died in 1966. In the early 1940s Masiello performed in clubs with Bertlies Weinschenk (also known by her married name as Lys Simonette, and after 1945 Kurt Weill’s assistant) as the two-piano team, "Yola and Lisa" (the Mexican sisters). Between 1944 and 1949 Masiello sang mezzo-soprano roles in regional companies, including Amneris, Herodias and Azucena and Carmen at the New York City Opera Company and in Fort Worth. Her vocal career was brief. "I never liked my voice tremendously", she claimed.

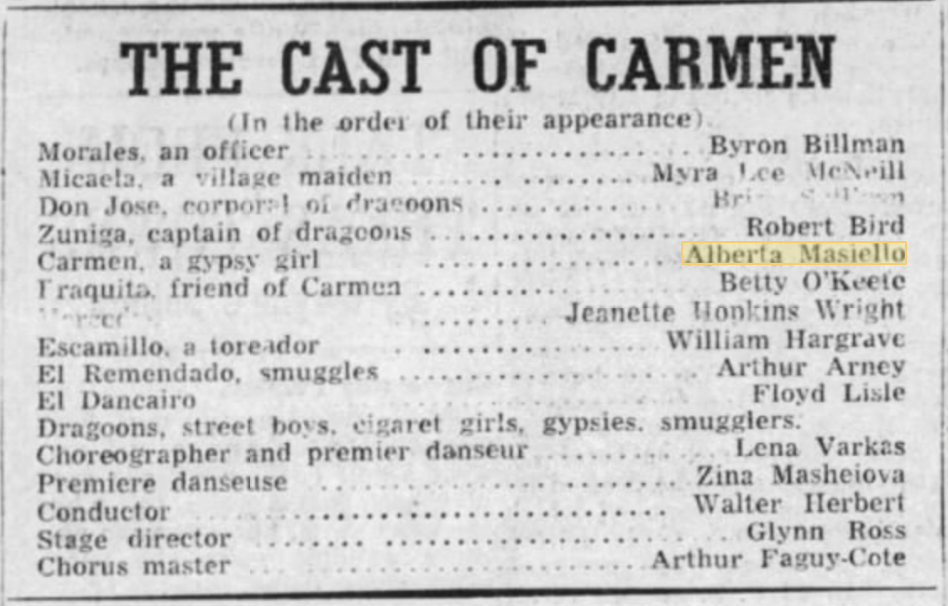
Fort Worth Star-Telegram (Fort Worth, Texas) 07 Nov 1948, Sun Page 28 i

Between 1949 and 1959 she worked at the New York City Opera, the Lyric Opera of Chicago and the Dallas Opera (where Masiello collaborated with Maria Callas in her capacity as chorus conductor). Masiello joined the Metropolitan Opera in 1959. During her twenty-one-year tenure there she became an icon of what an assistant conductor can do. Osie Hawkins, Met executive stage manager, referred to her as 'an orchestra in herself', "for she had the reputation of being able to play the score of Pelléas et Melisande note perfect, not to mention a very convincing hot jazz repertory". At the Met she was also known for her wry humour. During a rehearsal for Carmen with the conductor Leonard Bernstein, "when the first verse of the "Habanera" ended and a break was called, she head-snappingly startled everyone on that stage by quietly breaking into the strains of the Chopin Funeral March. "An opinion or a prophecy?" someone inquired. "An opinion" was her enigmatic reply. She retired from the Met in 1981 and continued teaching opera singers, pianists and conductors until her death in 1990. In 1979 Masiello received the Award for Professional Excellence from the National Opera Institute (San Francisco). Her archive is at the New York Public Library.

== Professional activity ==
During her lifetime Masiello prepared singers and conductors, such as Franco Corelli, Renée Fleming, Marko Lampas (Lamas), Paul Plishka and Marilyn Horne. Masiello was instrumental in coaching Maria Callas during a vocal crisis, teaching her daily in her studio at the Juilliard School. As a pianist, she worked with June Anderson, Karan Armstrong Gilda Cruz-Romo, Gianna Rolandi, Katherine Ciesinski, Mario del Monaco, Jessye Norman, Samuel Ramey, Renata Tebaldi and Christine Weidinger.

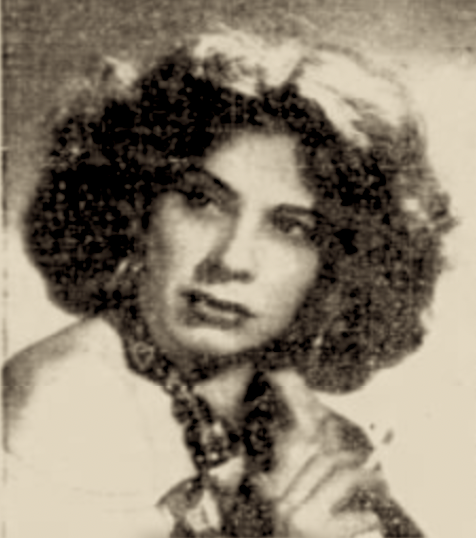
Opera singer Alberta Masiello as Carmen

Masiello did not conduct opera performances, but worked with coaches and pianists at her master classes at the Juilliard School and running the opera department at Mannes. Among her coaching students are David Leighton, Ann Lewin, Ben Malensek, Anthony (Toni) Manoli, Nic Muni and Eytan Pessen.

== Personality ==
Masiello was known to be a chain-smoker of thin brown cigarettes. She kept this habit to the end of her life, sitting in a wheelchair giving master classes in her studio, located a block away from the Juilliard School. As a teacher she would avoid first names, addressing students formally. According to Anthony Manoly, "Madame Masiello was always a stickler for pianists knowing how to "flutter" the pedal and sing with a beautiful limpid legato produced by a fine balance of legato playing with the fingers in addition to proper pedal usage. She also insisted that all pianists have a fine understanding of the orchestral scores of the opera you were coaching or playing for her that day. If you didn't have access to the score, she would direct you to her closet of full orchestra scores. She would say, "What do you see"? After you answered what you observed in the orchestral score, she would sternly reply "then PLAY IT"!!". Masiello was also a strict stylist, bandying the vast Zingarelli Italian dictionary to check open and closed vowels, and fighting for clean portamento-free singing. As Harvey E. Phillips tells of Masiello's rehearsal with Soprano Christine Weidinger, " 'Make sure those releases are clean', said the blond-haired Masiello, her pearl earrings shaking as she suppressed a persistent smoker's cough, "and no portamento, God forbid!" Referring to Alberta Masiello's radio broadcasts, the New York Times critic John Rockwell wrote that Masiello's "store of knowledge and imperious manner beguiled listeners for more than 30 years". According to American Bass Paul Plishka, Masiello "was one of the great, great people who influenced generations of singers in her lifetime. I was very upset at the New York Times obituary, which was very brief and gave the impression that she was merely an opera coach. You could have written an entire book about her work, and she deserved front page coverage. She was, a profound inspiration in my career and in so many others."
