= Maria Agresta =

Italian operatic soprano (born 1978)

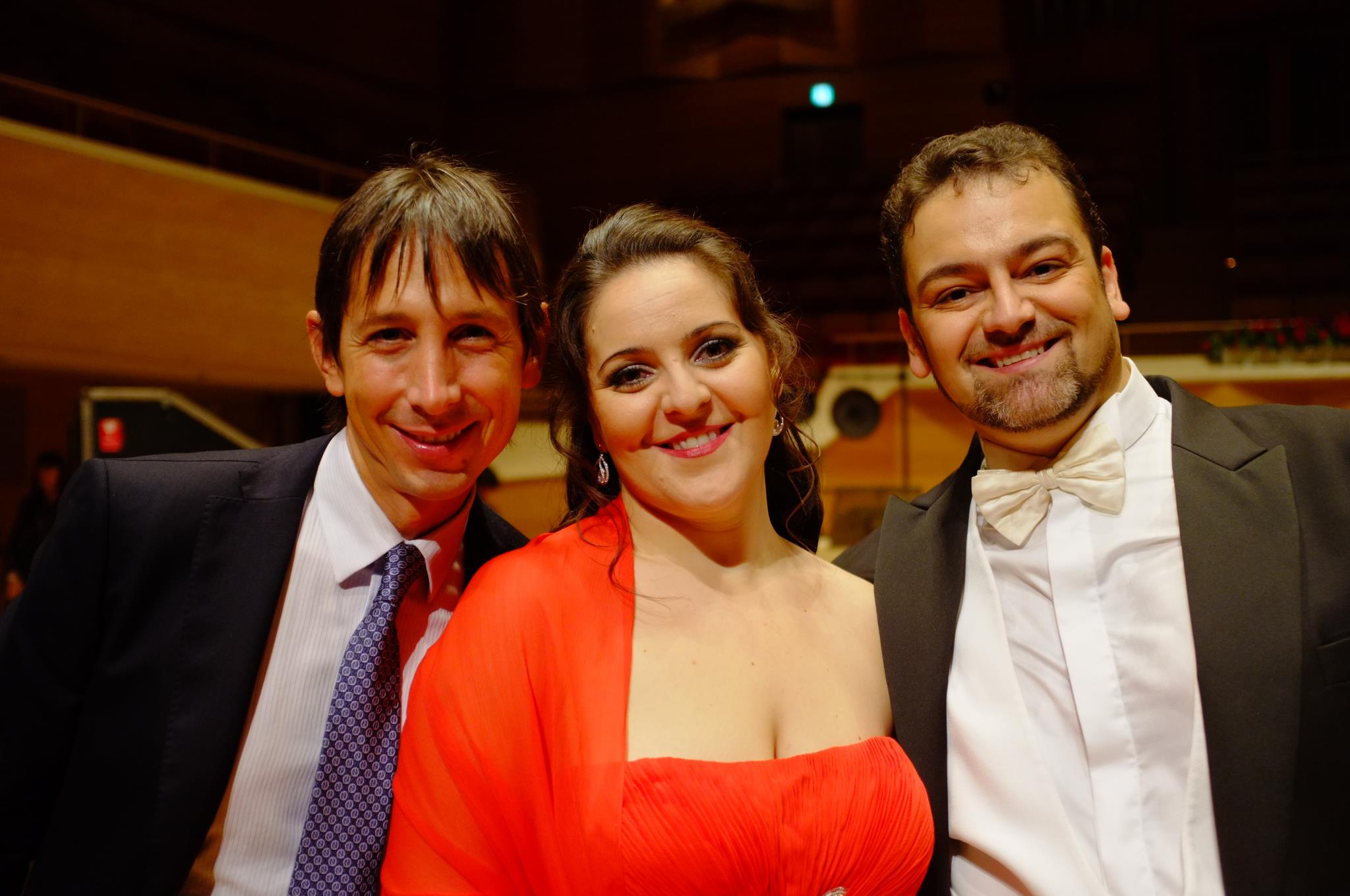
- Maria Agresta with tenor Giorgio Berrugi and her manager Gianluca Macheda (2016)
- Born: Maria Giovanna Agresta; 16 July 1978 (age 48); Vallo della Lucania, Italy
- Occupation: Operatic soprano
- Years active: 2006–present
- Website: www.mariaagresta.com

Maria Giovanna Agresta (born 16 July 1978) is an Italian operatic soprano.

== Life ==
Born in Vallo della Lucania, Agresta obtained her diploma at the Conservatorio Giuseppe Martucci in Salerno with top marks and then completed her studies with Raina Kabaivanska in Modena. In 2006 she made her debut in Spoleto as Rosina in Il barbiere di Siviglia and then appeared as Selene in Baldassare Galuppi's Didone abbandonata. She made her role debut as Micaëla in Carmen in 2007 in Messina and sang Desdemona in Otello in various venues.

Further roles from the Italian repertoire followed; including her role debut as Elena in I vespri siciliani at the Teatro Regio di Torino in 2011, which brought her wide recognition. Since then she has also sung at La Scala in Milan and other important opera houses such as the Teatro dell'Opera di Roma, La Fenice in Venice, the Bayerischen Staatsoper München, the Staatsoper Unter den Linden Berlin, the Semperoper in Dresden, the Royal Opera House London and the Palau de les Arts Reina Sofía Valencia. In 2014, Agresta appeared in Omaggio a Raina Kabaivanska, a tribute concert for Kabaivanska's 80th birthday at the Teatro Regio di Parma during Festival Verdi, performing with the Filarmonica Arturo Toscanini under the direction of Nayden Todorov. In 2015 she appeared for the first time at the Salzburg Easter Festivals with Jonas Kaufmann in the role of Nedda in Pagliacci. She made her debut at the Metropolitan Opera (New York) in January 2016 in the role of Mimi in La Bohème. At the Salzburg Festival in August 2016 she made an acclaimed role debut in the French repertoire as Marguerite in Gounod's Faust. In 2017 there followed further engagements at the Metropolitan Opera as Micaëla in Carmen in January and as Liù in Turandot in October. In 2014 Agresta was awarded the XXXIII Premio della Critica Musicale Italiana.

== Repertoire ==
Roles include:

Operatic repertoire
Role	Title	Composer
Norma	Norma	Bellini
Elvira	I puritani	Bellini
Micaela	Carmen	Bizet
Gemma	Gemma di Vergy	Donizetti
Selene	Didone abbandonata	Galuppi
Marguerite	Faust	Gounod
Nedda	Pagliacci	Leoncavallo
Donna Elvira	Don Giovanni	Mozart
Mimì	La bohème	Puccini
Angelica	Suor Angelica	Puccini
Liù	Turandot	Puccini
Rosina	Il barbiere di Siviglia	Rossini
Julia	La Vestale	Spontini
Leonora	Oberto, Conte di San Bonifacio	Verdi
Lucrezia Contarini	I due Foscari	Verdi
Odabella	Attila	Verdi
Amalia	I masnadieri	Verdi
Leonora	Il trovatore	Verdi
Violetta Valery	La traviata	Verdi
Amelia Grimaldi	Simon Boccanegra	Verdi
Elena	I vespri siciliani	Verdi
Desdemona	Otello	Verdi

Her concert repertoire includes also Rossini's Stabat Mater and Verdi's Requiem.

== See also ==
- Raina Kabaivanska
- Teatro Lirico Sperimentale

== Recordings ==
=== Audio ===
- Galuppi: Didone abbandonata – Piva/Grasso/Giansanti/Agresta/Carnevale/Carè, Welterstaufnahme 2006 Bongiovanni
- Verdi: Sacred Verdi. Quattro pezzi sacri, Libera me, Ave Maria – Maria Agresta, Orchestra e Coro dell’Accademia nazionale di Santa Cecilia / Antonio Pappano. 2014 Warner Classics

=== Video ===
- 2011: Gaetano Donizetti, Gemma di Vergy, Maria Agresta as Gemma. A live recording from the Teatro Donizetti, Bergamo; director: Laurent Gerger. Orchestra del Bergamo Musica Festival Gaetano Donizetti, Roberto Rizzi Brignoli. Published by Bongiovanni, 2011.
- 2015: Giuseppe Verdi, I due Foscari, Maria Agresta as Lucrezia Contarini, Placido Domingo as Francesco Foscari, Francesco Meli as Jacopo Foscari, Orchestra of the Royal Opera House Covent Garden, Antonio Pappano, director: Thaddeus Strassberger. Issued by Opus Arte, 2015.
- 2015: Giacomo Puccini, Turandot, Maria Agresta as Liù, La Scala, Riccardo Chailly. Published by Decca, Jan. 2017.
- 2015: Ruggiero Leoncavallo, Pagliacci, Maria Agresta as Nedda, Jonas Kaufmann as Canio, Staatskapelle Dresden, Christian Thielemann. A production of the Salzburg Easter Festival 2015; director: Philipp Stölzl. Published by Sony, 2015. (also with Pietro Mascagni, Cavalleria rusticana.)
- 2016: Charles Gounod, Faust, Maria Agresta as Marguerite, Pjotr Beczala as Faust, Ildar Abdrazakov as Mephisto. Salzburger Festspiele 2016, Philharmonischer Chor Wien, Vienna Philharmonic under Alejo Perez, director: Reinhard von der Thannen. Published by EuroArts, July 2017.
- 2017: Georges Bizet, Carmen, Elīna Garanča as Carmen, Maria Agresta as Micaela, Roberto Alagna as Don José, Ildar Abdrazakov as Esamillo. Paris Opera, conducted by Mark Elder; Calixto Bieito, stage director. Paris Opera Play.
