= Rutelli =

Rutelli is a surname. Notable people with the surname include:

- Francesco Rutelli (born 1954), Italian journalist and politician
- Mario Rutelli (1859–1941), Italian sculptor
