= Gisela! =

Opera by Hans Werner Henze

- Opera by Hans Werner Henze
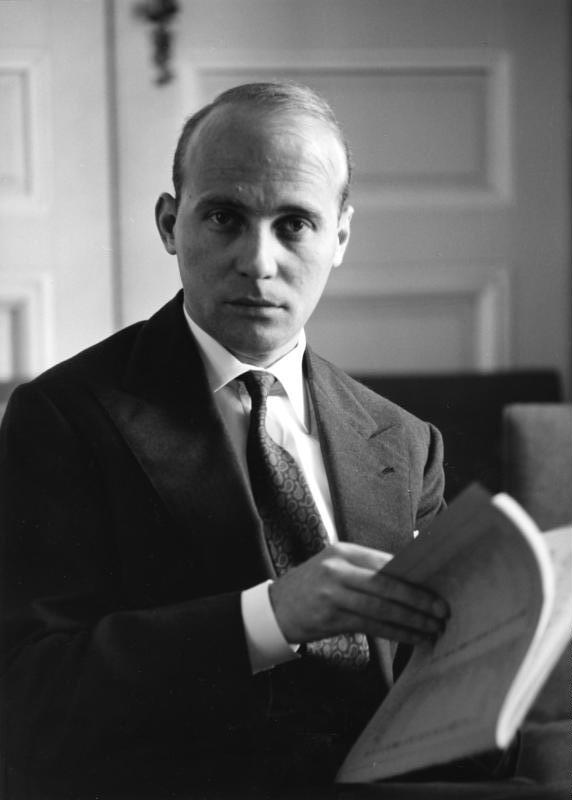
- The composer in 1960
- Language: German
- Premiere: 20 May 2010; Ruhrtriennale, Zeche Zweckel, Gladbeck

Gisela! oder: Die merk- und denkwürdigen Wege des Glücks (German for Gisela! or: The Strange and Memorable Ways of Happiness) is an opera by Hans Werner Henze.

== Background ==
Gisela! was first performed in the Maschinenhalle of the Zeche Zweckel, Gladbeck, Germany, on 25 September 2010 as part of the Ruhrtriennale music and arts festival by the contemporary music ensemble musikFabrik in collaboration with local youth groups and students of the Folkwang University, Essen. The work was commissioned 2008 by the Ruhr.2010 (European Culture Capital 2010) and the Semperoper, Dresden, where it was performed on 20 November 2010. A performance lasts for about 1 hour and 15 minutes. The conductor Steven Sloane (who was also the music director of the Ruhr.2010 festival) first performed the work. Pierre Audi directed, the cast included Hanna Herfurtner as Gisela, Fausto Reinhardt as Gennaro and Michael Dahmen as Hanspeter. The Semperoper team included the conductor Erik Nielsen and the director Elisabeth Stöppler, with Nadja Mchantaf as Gisela, Giorgio Berrugi as Gennaro and Markus Butter as Hanspeter.

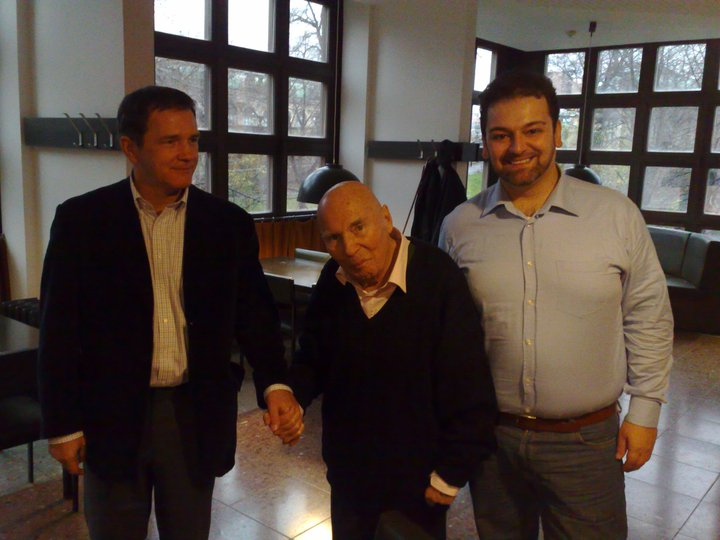
Hans Werner Henze, Dr. Michael Kerstan and Giorgio Berrugi at the Semperoper

== Performance options ==
The two first productions of Gisela! at the Ruhrtriennale and in Dresden show the two possible performing options: at the Ruhrtriennale all the performers were young people, mostly teens, and in Dresden the Staatskapelle and Staatsopernchor as well as the main Ensemble performed the work. The original commission, as discussed with Hans Werner Henze, Michael Kerstan, Ruhr.2010 music director Steven Sloane and Eytan Pessen was to continue the direction of Henze's Pollicino (a work written for children performers). Gisela!'s target performers are teenagers and young singers, although the score is demanding for orchestra, chorus and soloists – it is nevertheless performable by talented young singers. The Dresden version includes a slightly expanded arietta for the role of Hanspeter, and numerous changes. It is this version that was published.

== Henze's last opera ==
This opera was to be Hans Werner Henze's last. It is in some ways a parable to Henze's own life – a person from the north of Germany falling in love with Italy. The piece tells the story of a young student's love triangle, the choice Gisela has to make between her German boyfriend and the Italian alternative, as well as the difficulty of the Italian Gennaro to come to terms with life in northern Germany. It is interesting that Gisela's nightmares are based on Bach's music, eerily transformed. Gennaro chooses to express himself by singing "Aggio Saputo", a Neapolitan song which Henze used once before in his Neapolitan songs for baritone and orchestra.

== Roles ==
- Gisela Geldmaier, art history student (soprano)
- Gennaro Esposito (tenor)
- Hanspeter Schluckebier, vulcanology student (baritone)
- The German General Consul (bass)
- Another female tourist (soprano)
- Another male tourist (tenor)
- Antonio Scarlatti, inn keeper (baritone)
- A mime (silent)
- A female tourist (mezzo-soprano)
- Circa 12 actors and mimes, playing Hanspeter's accomplices and the Commedia dell'arte group
- Chorus

== Synopsis ==
Gisela, a young student of art history from the city of Oberhausen, visits Naples with her boyfriend Hanspeter and a group of superficial and arrogant students. They attend a commedia dell'arte performance in a folk theatre and Gisela is fascinated by the young actor Gennaro who plays the role of Pulcinella. Gisela and Gennaro encounter each other the next day and fall in love. They plan to flee from Naples and the group. Hanspeter, who had planned to propose to Gisela at a restaurant, hears that she has fled to Germany with Gennaro.

Having arrived at the railway station of Oberhausen, Gisela and Gennaro have nowhere to stay. Sitting on a bank, Gisela falls asleep and has a series of nightmare dreams. Suddenly Hanspeter and his friends appear and attack the couple. During the fight we see in the background Mount Vesuvius exploding and pouring its lava on stage.

== Performance history ==
- Premiere Gladbeck, RuhrTriennale, Ruhr.2010, 25 September 2010; conductor: Steven Sloane, director: Pierre Audi
- Premiere Dresden version, Semperoper Dresden, 20 November 2010; conductor: Erik Nielsen, director: Elisabeth Stöppler
- First performance in Italy, Teatro Massimo Palermo, 21 January 2015; conductor: Constantin Trinks, director: Emma Dante
