= Lys Symonette =

German-American musician (1914–2005)

- Born: Berta Elisabeth "Bertlies" Weinschenk; 21 December 1914; Mainz, Hesse, Germany
- Died: 27 November 2005 (aged 90); New York, United States
- Occupations: pianist singer musical assistant to Kurt Weill musical executive with the Kurt Weill foundation
- Spouse: Randolph Symonette (1910–1998)
- Children: Victor C. Symonette (conductor)
- Parent(s): Max Weinschenk; Gertrude Metzger

Bertlies "Lys" Symonette (born Berta Weinschenk: 21 December 1914 – 27 November 2005) was a German-American pianist, chorus singer and musical stage performer. In 1945 she took a job as rehearsal pianist, coach, understudy or multi-tasking "swing-girl" for The Firebrand of Florence, a Kurt Weill musical making its Broadway debut. This proved to be the start of a new career as Weill's musical assistant: from that point a principal focus of her professional life was on the composer and, more particularly after his early death in 1950, the career of his widow, the stage performer Lotte Lenya. When Lenya died, in 1981, Lys Symonette was appointed vice-president of the Kurt Weill Foundation, also serving as its "musical executive". When she died her friend and frequent collaborator, Prof. Kim H. Kowalke, published an affectionate tribute in which he described her as "the last and irreplaceable link to the inner artistic circle of Weill and Lenya".

== Life ==
=== Provenance and early years ===
Berta Elisabeth Weinschenk was born in Mainz. Max Weinschenk, her father, was a Jewish wine merchant. Her mother, born Gertrude Metzger, was a committed singer who, as a contralto, gave recitals not just in her home city but also in Frankfurt and Gotha. There was musicianship on her father's side too: Jacob Hugo Weinschenk, her uncle, was an enthusiastic 'cellist (who also wrote sonnets). Bertlies (as she quickly came to be known) grew up with her parents and her younger sister, Marianne, at the family home at "Fischtor 21" in Mainz. An early blow was the death of her father when she was eleven. Almost at once, however, Bertlies and Marianne found they had acquired a (Christian) stepfather, Dr. Willi Honheisser. She attended the "Linkenbach" private school and then, between 1924 and 1934, the Höhere Mädchenschule (senior girls' school) in Mainz. She passed her school final exams (Abitur) in 1934. She had not excelled particularly at mathematics and the sciences, but at the Senior School she had obtained top marks in singing and shown herself to be more than competent as a pianist. Her exam results in 1934 would, under other circumstances, have opened the way to university level education, but it was at this time still unusual for girls to attend university and the times were, in any case, malign. Nevertheless, at some point she was taught by Lothar Windsperger at the Peter Cornelius Conservatory in Mainz, and she briefly moved to Berlin to embark on a period as a music student, studying both the piano and singing.

=== Nazi takeover ===
At the start of 1933 the Nazi Party took power in Weimar Germany and lost little time in transforming the country into a one-party dictatorship. The shrill antisemitism which had featured prominently in Nazi propaganda during the preceding decade became a key underpinning of government policy. During 1933 and 1934 many believed that the government, like others before it, would not last, but four years later the Nazis were still in control. At this stage arrest and imprisonment were still, for the most part, restricted to those Jews who were politically active: nevertheless, employment and business opportunities were being systematically cut away. In September 1933 Bertlies Weinschenk obtained an exit visa and relocated with her family, briefly, to Cologne where her sister had found a job in the garments industry. In 1936 she fled via Italy to Cuba. Bertlies would later recall that on the day they left Cologne she opened the balcony window of the hotel room where she was staying and played records of music from Kurt Weill's Threepenny Opera – which had been banned in Germany since 1933 – for the benefit of passers-by. From Cuba, helped by American contacts, she was able to obtain the necessary permits to enter the United States of America towards the end of 1937. In 1938 she was joined in the U.S. by her younger sister, who had managed to make the journey from Nazi Germany with fewer hold-ups.

=== New life in the United States ===
It was also in 1938 that Bertlies Weinschenk enrolled at the Curtis Institute of Music in Philadelphia where, as before, she studied as both a piano and a voice student. She received a stipendium which funded her studies and covered her living expenses. Her teachers included Vera Brodsky and Elisabeth Schumann. Someone else whom she met at the Curtis was Ned Rorem, a composition student from the mid-west: she became the first singer to perform Rorem's songs in public. After graduating, during the early 1940s she performed regularly in clubs across the country as part of the two-piano combo "Yola and Lisa, the Mexican sisters" with Alberta Masiello, for which the two young women dressed "appropriately", "with big skirts and big earrings". The story is told of one night when the "sisters" were hired to perform at a club venue precariously located at the end of a pier in Galveston: they played on through a hurricane in order to avoid foregoing their fee.

=== Kurt Weill and Randolph Symonette ===
It was Maurice Abravanel who recommended her to Kurt Weill as a rehearsal pianist for his new 1945 Broadway musical, The Firebrand of Florence. Abravanel was the conductor for the original production. As she would later laconically recall, Abravenal "suspected that [she] might be able to do the job, having been both a voice and piano major at the Curtis ...". After three days of "sight-reading-transposing-improvising" as she provided accompaniment for what felt like a never ending succession of auditioneers, a small man emerged, grinning, from the shadows of the auditorium: "I'd love to have you in the show. I'm Kurt Weill". Until Weill's early death in 1950 she worked closely with him. Using the stage name "Lys Bert" she appeared in the chorus. On the occasion of Lotte Lenya's Broadway debut, the great diva (still relatively unknown outside Germany) was to be preceded by Billy Dee Williams singing "Make Way for the Duchess", but Williams found himself unable to maintain his pitch that night and the song was instead sung offstage by the "boyish-sounding soprano", "Lisa Bert" (as she was listed on that occasion). Despite participating in stage performances, it appears that her more crucial contribution quickly became as a répétiteuse and as a coach for the singers. She evidently had an intense understanding of the singular singing style that Weill's music invited and, she would have insisted, needed. In 1949 she embarked on a parallel role as a translator, applying her skills to the libtretto of Weill's 1927 one-act comic opera, Der Zar lässt sich photographieren (The Czar Has His Photograph Taken) for the Metropolitan Opera studio.

The part of the Hangman in the original production of The Firebrand of Florence had been taken by a New York bass-baritone called Randolph Symonette. In October 1949, Lost in the Stars opened on Broadway. Her rehearsal work done, Lys left for an extended visit to Canada where she married "The Hangman". They returned to New York in March 1950: when Lys Symonette tried to telephone him that she was back, the telephone was answered by a maid who told her that "Mr Weill" was in hospital. He died a few days later. This triggered a major turning point. Randolph and Lys Symonette now relocated to West Germany where Randolph Symonette appeared in various major opera houses, focusing on some of the large-voice Wagner roles. Initially he spoke absolutely no German and his new wife had to coach him phonetically for his roles. During the 1953/54 season Lys was able to return with her husband to Mainz where he appeared at the recently reopened Staatstheater. During their time living in West Germany she also promoted Weill's later works in that country "through ingenious translations and ceaseless proselytizing". The couple's son Victor C. Symonette as a conductor.

=== Return to New York ===
Ten years later the couple returned to New York City. Over the next few years Randolph made a number of further appearances at the Metropolitan Opera. Lys appeared with Weill's widow, Lotte Lenya at the Theatre de Lys, accompanying the singer in Gene Frankel's production, Brecht on Brecht. Over the next couple of decades she worked closely with Lenya as accompanist, trusted musical advisor and, at least on matters touching Kurt Weill's artistic legacy, friend and mentor. She persuaded Lenya to allow her to hand over a fat pile of unpublished Kurt Weill songs to Teresa Stratas which led to the publication of numerous songs that otherwise would have been lost to posterity including, most notably, "Youkali".

In 1968 the Symonettes relocated to Tallahassee where Randolph had accepted a teaching job – later a professorship – at Florida State University. Two years after that she was drawn back to New York City in order to be at the side of Lotte Lenya during preparations for an English-language premiere of Weill's Aufstieg und Fall der Stadt Mahagonny (Rise and Fall of the City of Mahagonny). Preparation of the opera had been dogged by artistic and legal disagreement, and Symonette reprised her role as "musical representative" of Lotte Lenya for rehearsals and performances. In the end credit for the translation of the libretto was shared between Lys Symonette and the poet Arnold Weinstein.

As the 1970s progressed the amount of time spent supporting Lotte Lenya increased. Additionally, in 1974 Lys Symonette returned to the Curtis Institute, now as a voice coach. During the decade she collaborated on several new Weill productions and engaged in other projects which involved the publication and, frequently, the performance of hitherto unknown Kurt Weill songs.

=== Later years and the Kurt Weill Foundation ===
Lotte Lenya died of cancer on 27 November 1981. She had been ill for several years, undergoing surgery in 1977 and again in 1978, and had initially avoided the implications of her failing health for her late husband's artistic legacy. However, by the later summer of 1980 she had been persuaded to give the matter serious consideration, and on 25 September a board of six trustees was elected for the newly established "Kurt Weill Foundation". The six included Kim Kowalke, today (2017) the foundation's long-standing president and, Lys Symonette who for a quarter of a century, till her death would serve as the foundation's vice-president. When Lenya died the foundation's mandate to "administer, promote, and perpetuate the legacies of Kurt Weill and Lotte Lenya" was confirmed in her will.

Lys Symonette suffered a fatal heart attack at Windsor, New York, less than a month before what would have been her ninety-first birthday.
