= Kang Wang (opera singer) =

Australian-Chinese opera singer (born 1988)

- 王亢
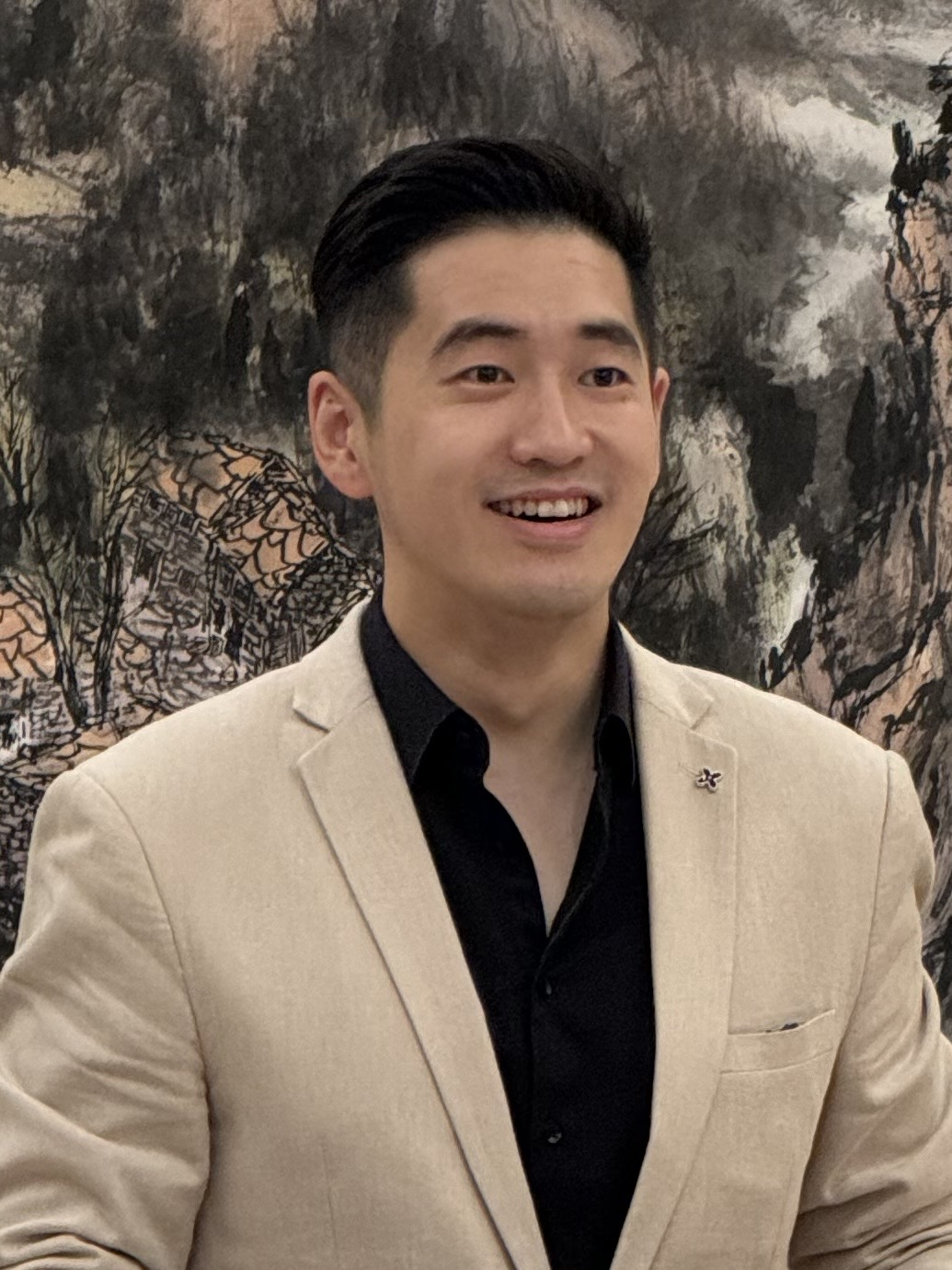
- Born: 1988 (age 37–38); Harbin, China
- Occupation: Opera singer
- Website: www.kangwangtenor.com

Kang Wang (born 1988) is an Australian-Chinese operatic tenor who has established an international career particularly in roles such as Rodolfo in La bohème and Alfredo in La traviata. He is a former member of the Lindemann Young Artist Development Program of the Metropolitan Opera and a finalist in the 2017 BBC Cardiff Singer of the World competition.

== Early life and education ==
Born in Harbin, China in 1988, Kang Wang is the son of two professional opera singers. Kang moved to Australia as a teenager and completed a Bachelor degree in Information Technology. After working as a programmer for three years in Darwin, Australia, he left his job and moved to Brisbane to complete his Master of Music Studies at Queensland Conservatorium Griffith University and gained his International Artist Diploma in Opera at Royal Northern College of Music in Manchester, UK.

After gaining his degrees, he joined the "OperAvenir" program at Theater Basel in Switzerland, then the Lindemann Young Artist Development Program of the Metropolitan Opera the following year.

== Career ==
Since finishing his involvement with the Lindemann Young Artist Development Program, Kang Wang appeared as Rodolfo in La bohème in houses such as the Zurich Opera, Maggio Musicale Fiorentino, Opera Hong Kong and the Sydney Opera House, where critics described his voice as "molten chocolate that slides over even the highest notes". Also as Alfredo in La traviata with Welsh National Opera, Teatro di San Carlo, Glimmerglass Festival, Opera Queensland and Opera Australia. His roles also includes The Italian Singer in Der Rosenkavalier at the Metropolitan Opera, Hoffmann with Palm Beach Opera, Macduff in Macbeth with the Washington National Opera, and Pinkerton with the Canadian Opera Company where he was praised for his "big ringing tenor and brilliant top register" and "shining, heroic, easy, ringing sound".

In concerts, Kang Wang has joined orchestras such as the NDR Radiophilharmonie in the Hannover Klassik Open Air alongside soprano Pretty Yende and baritone Simon Keenlyside and the Munich Radio Orchestra as Roberto in Le Villi and was hailed for his "luminous and brilliant timbre" and "surprising dramatic force".
