= Tatjana Gürbaca =

German opera director (born 1973)

- Born: 1973 (age 52–53); Berlin, Germany
- Education: Hochschule für Musik Hanns Eisler
- Occupation: Opera director
- Organizations: Staatstheater Mainz
- Awards: International Opera Award

Tatjana Gürbaca (born 1973) is a German opera director of Turkish (on her father's side) and Italian/Slovenian (on her mother's side) descent. Based at the Staatstheater Mainz from 2011 to 2014, she directed operas internationally, including contemporary operas and world premieres.

== Life and career ==
Gürbaca was born in Berlin in 1973 to a Turkish father and an Italian mother of Slovene descent. Her father who had studied classical Turkish singing in Turkey had left the country in the 1960s for political reasons. Her mother belonged to the Slovenian minority in Italy. She loved music by Puccini and liked story-telling. The girl was trained in ballet, piano, cello and double bass. She attended a gymnasium with music focused on music and the arts. She played in orchestras, jazzbands, a klezmer group and a tango orchestra. Her music teacher brought her to the Deutsche Oper Berlin as an extra. She received German citizenship at age 17.

Gürbaca first studied art history, literature and theatre science at the Free University of Berlin without completing it. From 1993 she studied stage direction at the Hochschule für Musik Hanns Eisler in Berlin. She studied further in master courses by Ruth Berghaus and Peter Konwitschny, among others. She worked as assistant director at the Graz Opera from 1998 to 2001.

Gürbaca was winner of the Ring Award competition in 2000; subsequently she directed Puccini's Turandot at the Graz Opera. From 2011 to 2014, she was the general manager of the opera department of the Staatstheater Mainz. She was named "Stage director of the year" in 2013 by the critics of the trade magazine Opernwelt. Her production of Wagner's Parsifal at the Vlaamse Opera received the International Opera Award in the category "Best opera production" in 2014. She staged productions at Berlin State Opera, Deutsche Oper Berlin, Wiener Volksoper, Oper Graz, Oper Leipzig, Deutsche Oper am Rhein in Düsseldorf, Theater Bremen, Festspielhaus Baden-Baden, Novosibirsk Opera, Lucerne Festival, among others.

In 2024 Gürbaca directed Halévy's La Juive at the Oper Frankfurt, set in medieval times but she exposed antisemitism as actuality. The choir, prepared by Tilman Michael, played a decisive role as both Jewish congregation and Christian crowd in dynamic movement.

== Works ==
- 2001, Puccini: Turandot, Graz Opera
- 2001, Haydn: La canterina and Lo speziale, Haydn Festspiele, Eisenstadt
- 2002, Patrick Boltshauser: Brot und Spiele, Schauspielhaus Graz
- 2002, Stravinsky: Mavra, Berlin State Opera
- 2003, Pergolesi: Il prigioniero, Wiener Volksoper
- 2003, Purcell: Dido and Aeneas, Festspielhaus Baden-Baden
- 2004, Leoncavallo: Pagliacci and Mascagni: Cavalleria rusticana, Theater Regensburg
- 2005, Mozart: Così fan tutte, Luzerner Theater
- 2006, Menotti: The Old Maid and the Thief, Graz Opera
- 2006, Offenbach: Les contes d'Hoffmann, Graz Opera
- 2006, Tchaikovsky: Mazeppa, Bern Theatre
- 2006, Kraus: Soliman II and Mozart: Zaide, Theater Luzern
- 2006, Hersant: Der schwarze Mönch (world premiere), Oper Leipzig
- 2007, Verdi: Rigoletto, Graz Opera
- 2007, Mozart: Le nozze di Figaro, Novosibirsk Opera
- 2007, Così fan tutte, Prinzregententheater, Munich
- 2007, Donizetti: Lucia di Lammermoor, Staatstheater Mainz
- 2007, Ligeti: Le Grand Macabre, Theater Bremen, with Sara Hershkowitz
- 2008, Mozart: Die Entführung aus dem Serail, Theater Augsburg
- 2008, Massenet: Werther, Staatstheater Mainz
- 2008, Wagner: Der fliegende Holländer, Deutsche Oper Berlin
- 2008, Massenet: Manon, Staatstheater Mainz
- 2009, Mazeppa, Vlaamse Opera, Antwerpen
- 2009, Bizet: Carmen, Oper Leipzig
- 2009, R. Strauss: Salome, Deutsche Oper am Rhein
- 2010, Tchaikovsky: Eugene Onegin, Vlaamse Opera
- 2011, Sciarrino: Macbeth, Staatstheater Mainz
- 2012, Verdi: Un ballo in maschera, Staatstheater Mainz
- 2013, Wagner: Parsifal, Vlaamse Opera
- 2013, Verdi: Macbeth, Staatstheater Mainz
- 2014, Verdi: Aida, Opernhaus Zürich
- 2015, Verdi: La traviata, Den Norske Opera Oslo
- 2016, Braunfels: Szenen aus dem Leben der Heiligen Johanna, Cologne Opera
- 2016, Der fliegende Holländer, Vlaamse Opera
- 2016, Wagner: Lohengrin, Aalto Theatre Essen
- 2018, Weber: Der Freischütz, Aalto Theatre
- 2020, Korngold: Die tote Stadt, Cologne Opera
- 2022, Dallapiccola: Ulisse, Oper Frankfurt
- 2024, Louise Bertin: Fausto, Aalto Theatre
- 2024, Halévy: La Juive, Oper Frankfurt

== Awards ==
- Ring Award, 2000
- International Opera Award, 2014
