= Giovanni Lentini the Elder =

Italian painter (1830–1898)

Giovanni Lentini the Elder (1830 in Trapani, Sicily – 1898) was an Italian painter and scenic designer.

== Biography ==
He first studied under his father, then went to study in Palermo. Among his patrons was Count Tasca, for whom he made many decorations at the Count's residence. He was trained in scenography by Morselli. He gained a post as scenographer for the Royal Bellini theater. He completed his studies under the Roman scenographer Mantovani. Lentini had many disciples, among them, the scenographer Giuseppe Cavallari. When Lentini entered asylum, Cavallari took his post.

His son Rocco Lentini (1858 – 1943) was a landscape painter and graphic artist. His grandson of the same name, Giovanni Lentini the Younger (Palermo, 1882 – 1948), was also a painter, docent of the Brera Academy, and active in Milan for nearly three decades.
