= Ulisse (opera) =

1968 opera by Luigi Dallapiccola

- Opera by Luigi Dallapiccola
- Librettist: Dallapiccola
- Language: Italian
- Based on: Ulysses
- Premiere: September 29, 1968 (in German); Deutsche Oper Berlin

Ulisse [uˈlisse] is an opera in a prologue and two acts composed by Luigi Dallapiccola to his own libretto based on the legend of Ulysses. It premiered at the Deutsche Oper Berlin (in German translation by Karl-Heinrich Kreith as Odysseus) on 29 September 1968 conducted by Lorin Maazel with Erik Saedén in the title role. Ulisse was Dallapiccola's only full-length last opera and took eight years to compose. As in his previous one-act operas, Volo di notte and Il prigioniero, his declared theme was "the struggle of man against some force much stronger than he".

== Roles ==
- Ulisse – baritone (Erik Saedén)
- Calypso / Penelope – soprano (Annabelle Bernard)
- Nausicaa – soprano (Catherine Gayer)
- Re Alcinoo – bass (Victor von Halem)
- Demodoco – tenor (Helmuth Melchert)
- Circe – mezzo-soprano (Jean Madeira)
- La madre di Anticlea (mother of Anticlea) – soprano (Hildegard Hillebrecht)
- Tiresia – tenor (Helmuth Melchert)
- Pisandro (a suitor) – baritone (José van Dam)
- Antinoo – baritone (Ernst Krukowski)
- Eurimaco – tenor (Karl Ernst Mercker)
- Melanto – mezzo-soprano (Jean Madeira)
- Eumeo – tenor (Loren Driscoll)
- Telemaco – contralto (Barbara Scherler)
- Ancella 1 (handmaid 1) – soprano (Gitta Mikes)
- Ancella 2 (handmaid 2) – contralto (Helga Wisniewaska)
