= Ortolani =

Ortolani may refer to:

== People ==
- Angiolina Ortolani-Tiberini (1834–1913), born Angiolina Ortolani, 19th-century Italian operatic soprano
- Franco Ortolani (1943–2019), Italian academic and politician
- Leonardo Ortolani (born 1967), Italian comics author
- Marino Ortolani (1904–1983), Italian physician
- Riz Ortolani (1926–2014), Italian film composer
- Umberto Ortolani (1913–2002) Italian businessman

== Other ==
- Dino Ortolani, a character in the TV series Oz
- Ortolani test, a physical examination for developmental dysplasia of the hip

== See also ==
- Ortolan (disambiguation)
- Orto (disambiguation)
