= Dshamilja Kaiser =

German mezzo-soprano

Dshamilja Kaiser is a German operatic mezzo-soprano. She has been performing at the Oper Bonn since 2017.

== Life and career ==
Born in Wuppertal, Kaiser studied singing at the Hochschule für Musik Detmold with Mechthild Böhme and Caroline Thomas. Already during her studies she sang in university productions of Handel and Rossini operas and made a guest appearance as Lisetta in Haydn's Il mondo della luna at the Städtische Bühnen Münster. She won singing competitions and was a scholarship holder of the Studienstiftung des deutschen Volkes and the Richard-Wagner-Stiftung Bayreuth. In July 2007, she completed her studies with the artistic maturity examination - as Carmen in a university performance at the Landestheater Detmold. A permanent engagement at the Theater Bielefeld followed, where she sang Scarlatti, Mozart and Glinka, among others, as well as guest appearances at the Theater Münster, the Mecklenburgisches Staatstheater Schwerin, the Landestheater Linz and the Aalto Theatre in Essen.

Since the 2009/10 season; the mezzo-soprano has been part of the ensemble of the Graz Opera. She has sung and continues to sing a number of leading roles there, especially rival heroines or trouser roles - from Baroque and Mozart to bel canto and Richard Wagner - and works there with renowned directors and conductors, including Stefan Herheim and Stefan Soltesz.

At the Wiener Festwochen 2012 Kaiser made a guest appearance as Annina in Verdi's La traviata, in July 2013 at Operklosterneuburg as Frau Reich in Nicolai's The Merry Wives of Windsor, in January 2014 she made her debut at the Volksoper Wien in the title role of Bizet's Carmen. She subsequently also sang Dorabella in Mozart's Così fan tutte at the Haus am Gürtel. In summer 2016, she made her debut at the Bregenz Festival as Gertrude in a long-lost Hamlet opera from 1865 - in Franco Faccio's Amleto. Her partners were Pavel Černoch in the title role, Iulia Maria Dan as Ophelia and Claudio Sgura as Claudio. It was directed by Olivier Tambosi and conducted by Paolo Carignani.

In the concert hall, Kaiser sings both concert opera performances and large choral-orchestral works. In November 2013, she gave a guest performance with the Grazer Philharmoniker conducted by Dirk Kaftan at the Wiener Musikverein, singing the song cycle Les nuits d'été by Hector Berlioz after poems by Théophile Gautier. In February 2015, in a concert performance by the Orchestra Sinfonica di Milano Giuseppe Verdi conducted by Gaetano d'Espinosa in Milan, she took on the role of soprano. – Judit in Bartók's Bluebeard's Castle.

== Major roles ==
Bellini:

- Romeo in I Capuleti e i Montecchi
- Adalgisa in Norma

Bizet:

- Title part in Carmen

Donizetti:

- Elisabetta in Maria Stuarda
- Léonor de Guzman in La favorite

Faccio:

- Gertrude in Amleto

Glinka:

- Ratmir in Ruslan und Ljudmila

Handel:

- Arsamenes in Serse

Humperdinck:

- Hänsel in Hänsel und Gretel

Mozart:

- Cherubino in Le nozze di Figaro
- Dorabella in Così fan tutte
- Sesto in La clemenza di Tito

Scarlatti:

- Gualtiero in Griselda

Johann Strauss II:

- Prinz Orlofsky in Die Fledermaus

Wagner:

- Magdalene in Die Meistersinger von Nürnberg
- Brangäne in Tristan und Isolde
- Ortrud in Lohengrin

== Competitions and awards ==
- 2005: Landeswettbewerb Nordrhein-Westfalen Gesang, Düsseldorf
- 2008: Bergheimer Sängerpreis
- 2015: Österreichischer Musiktheaterpreis, Beste Nachwuchssängerin – for La favorite (Leonor de Guzman) an der Oper Graz
