= Iulia Maria Dan =

Romanian operatic soprano

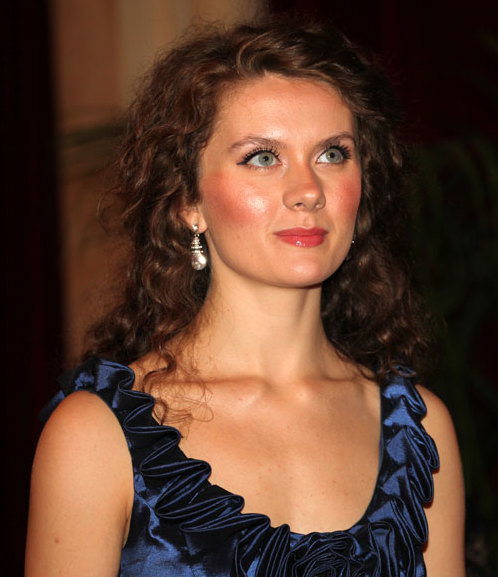
- Dan in 2014
- Born: 1987 (age 38–39); Romania
- Education: National University of Music Bucharest
- Occupation: Operatic soprano
- Organizations: Hamburg State Opera; Semperoper
- Awards: International Hans Gabor Belvedere Singing Competition

Iulia Maria Dan (born 1987) is a Romanian operatic soprano. She was a member of the ensemble of the Hamburg State Opera from 2015 to 2018, and then moved on to the Semperoper in Dresden. She appeared at international opera houses and festivals in leading roles such as Fiordiligi in Mozart's Così fan tutte and the title role in Massenet's Manon, but also in unusual repertoire including Ofelia in the revival of Franco Faccio's Amleto.

== Life and career ==
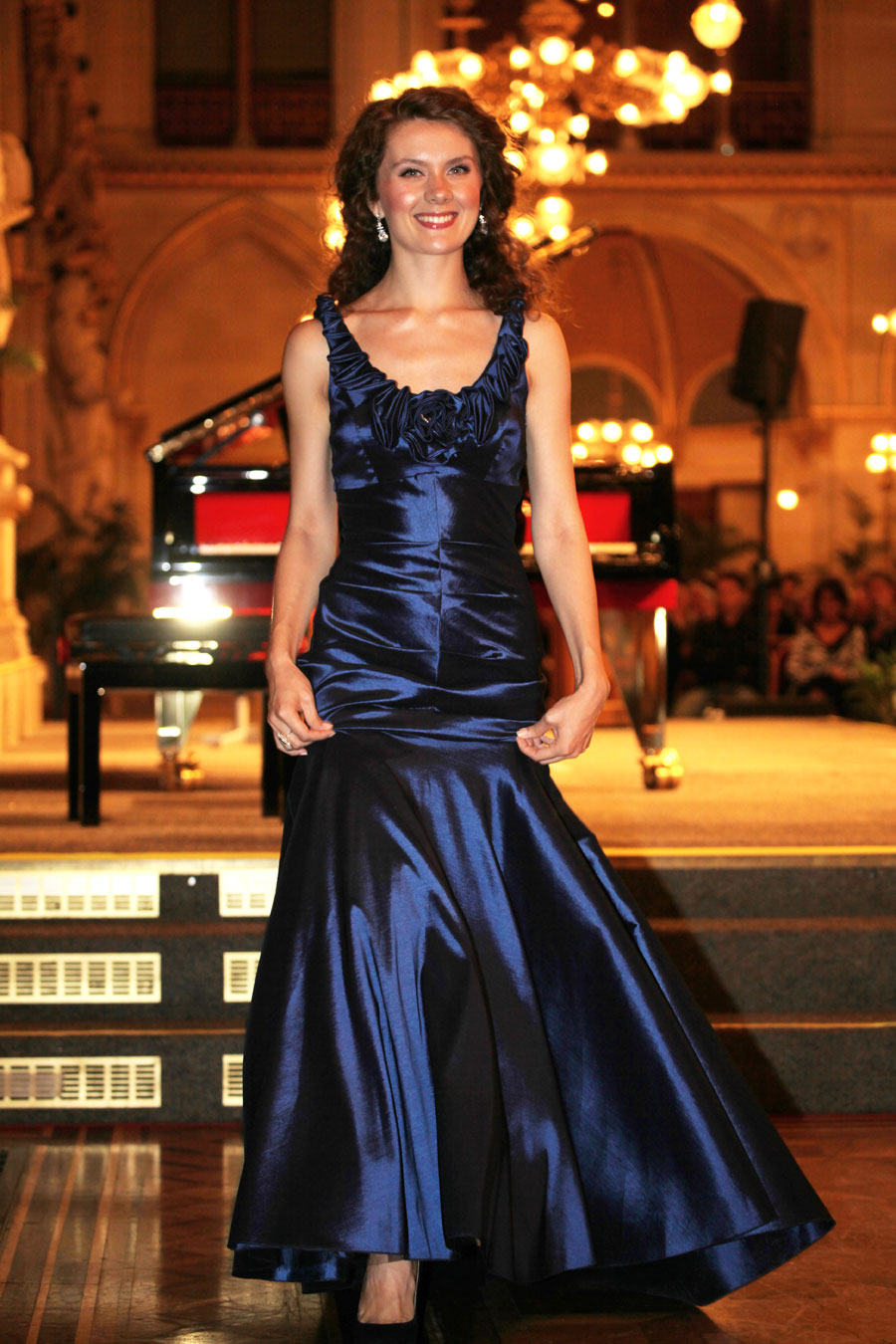
Dan in 2014

Born in Romania, Dan studied singing with Maria Slătinaru-Nistor at the National University of Music Bucharest and won several prizes at singing competitions. In 2011 she made her debut as Gilda in Verdi's Rigoletto at the Romanian National Opera. She was accepted to the studio at the Bavarian State Opera in Munich, joining the ensemble of the State Opera in 2013, first performing smaller roles such as the vixen Schlaukopf in Janáček's The Cunning Little Vixen and Nano in Jenůfa, servants in Verdi's Simon Boccanegra and Die Frau ohne Schatten by Richard Strauss. She advanced to roles such as Papagena in Mozart's Die Zauberflöte, Frasquita in Bizet's Carmen and Gianetta in Donizetti's L'elisir d'amore. In August 2014, Dan starred at the Verbier Festival as Aminta in Mozart's Il re pastore, to great acclaim. She appeared in the title role of Massenet's Manon at the Graz Opera in 2015.

In 2015, she became a member of the Hamburg State Opera, where she appeared in her first season as Rosalinde in Die Fledermaus by Johann Strauss, Countess Almaviva in Mozart's Le nozze di Figaro and Fiordiligi in Così fan tutte, Tatjana in Tchaikovsky's Eugene Onegin and Agathe in Weber's Der Freischütz. She then performed also Mimì in Puccini's La Bohème and Helena in Britten's A Midsummer Night's Dream. She joined the ensemble of the Semperoper in Dresden in 2018.

In the summer of 2016, she performed at the Bregenz Festival as Ofelia in the revival of Franco Faccio's Amleto, alongside Pavel Černoch, Dshamilja Kaiser and Claudio Sgura, directed by Olivier Tambosi and conducted by Paolo Carignani.

In 2022 she sang Donna Anna in Mozart's Don Giovanni at the Ravenna festival and then in Rimini (with Drottningholms Slottsteater) as well as at the Israeli Opera in March 2023 and she added to her repertoire the role of Thalie/Clarine in Rameau's Platée at the Semperoper, Dresden, as well as Micaela in Carmen at the Opéra de Rouen Normandie's recreation of the original 1875 production of the opera.

In 2024 she will sing Desdemona at the Israeli Opera and again Rosalinde in Die Fledermaus in concert with Les Musiciens du Louvre, in Baden-Baden.

Dan also sang in concerts in Barcelona, Bucharest, Gdańsk, Milan and Modena. In 2010, she participated in the world premiere of Felicia Donceanu's Salbe – Monodrama for Soprano and Orchestra.

== Roles ==
Bizet:

- Frasquita in Carmen
- Micaëla in Carmen

Britten:

- Helena in A Midsummer Night's Dream

Donizetti:

- Gianetta in L'elisir d'amore

Massenet:

- Title role in Manon

Mozart:

- Aminta in Il re pastore
- Contessa in Le nozze di Figaro
- Donna Anna in Don Giovanni
- Fiordiligi in Così fan tutte
- First Lady, Papagena in Die Zauberflöte

Puccini

- Mimì in La Bohème

Rameau

- Thalie/Clarine in Platée

Rossini

- Mathilde in William Tell

Johann Strauss II:

- Rosalinde in Die Fledermaus

Tschaikowski:

- Tatjana in Eugene Onegin

Verdi:

- Gilda in Rigoletto
- Desdemona in Otello

Wagner:

- Forest Bird in Siegfried

Weber:

- Agathe in Der Freischütz

== Awards ==
- 2008: Orange Young Musicians Competition, First Prize
- 2010: Ionel Perlea National Song Competition, Grand Prize
- 2010: Arta Florescu Masters of the Lyrical Art International Competition in Bucharest, Special Prize
- 2011: International Hans Gabor Belvedere Singing Competition, Most Promising Young Artist, Graz Opera Special Prize und Soroptimist Prize
