= Amleto =

1865 opera by Franco Faccio

- Opera by Franco Faccio
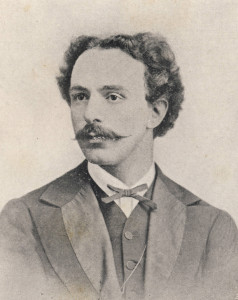
- The composer around the time when he wrote the opera
- Librettist: Arrigo Boito
- Language: Italian
- Based on: Shakespeare's Hamlet
- Premiere: 30 May 1865; Teatro Carlo Felice, Genoa

Amleto (English: Hamlet) is an Italian opera in four acts by Franco Faccio set to a libretto by Arrigo Boito, based on Shakespeare's play Hamlet. It premiered on 30 May 1865 at the Teatro Carlo Felice in Genoa and was revised for a La Scala production given on 12 February 1871.

The collaboration and friendship between librettist and composer was to last throughout Faccio's lifetime. In addition (as musicologist William Ashbrook states): "Amleto marks an effort of two prominent members of the Scapigliatura (a late Romantic reform movement in northern Italy in the 1860s and 70s) to renew the tradition of Italian opera."

After the La Scala revival in 1871, the opera disappeared for almost 130 years. However, in recent years, copies of the score and libretto have reappeared and conductor Anthony Barrese created a critical edition which was presented in a fully staged version by Opera Southwest in Albuquerque, New Mexico, and by Baltimore Concert Opera in concert form in Baltimore, Maryland, in October 2014.

== Composition history ==
The history of Amleto, from a libretto which Italian musicologist Raffaello De Rensis states was written specifically for Faccio by Arrigo Boito, is somewhat unclear as to how the choice of Hamlet as a subject came about, but the librettist completed his "innovatory libretto" on 2 July 1862 while in Poland, well ahead of Faccio's first opera.

However, Faccio's first collaboration with Boito had been in writing a patriotic cantata, Il quattro giugno in 1860 when Boito also wrote some of the music as well as the text, and this was followed by a sequel, La sorelle d'Italia, also in the spirit of the movement towards Italian unification. Ashbrook notes that one aspect of this opera's importance lies in the fact that, "as the first of Boito's librettos derived from Shakespeare, it reveals the future poet of Otello and Falstaff collaborating with a far less experienced and gifted composer than Verdi."

Faccio's first opera, I profughi fiamminghi, was given at La Scala in 1863, but its failure was followed by a celebratory party given for Faccio by his friends and the event included Boito's reading of the infamous "Ode saffica col bicchiere alla mano", which infuriated Giuseppe Verdi.

== Performance history ==
=== Genoa premiere ===
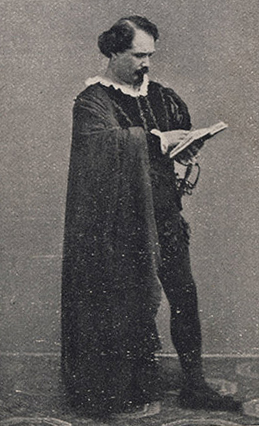
Mario Tiberini as Amleto (1865)

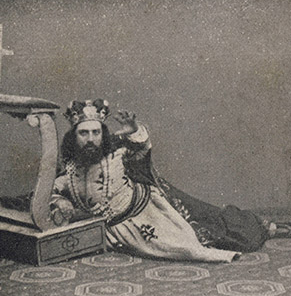
Antonio Cotogni as Claudio (1865)

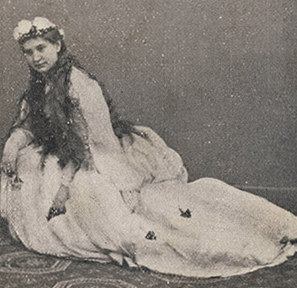
Angiolina Ortolani-Tiberini as Ofelia (1865)

The opera was premiered on 30 May 1865 at Genoa's Teatro Carlo Felice. The cast included some of the finest singers of the day, including Mario Tiberini in the role of Amleto. According to De Rensis, the work was accepted at the Carlo Felice because of the personal intervention of Boito's Conservatory professor Alberto Mazzucato, who was friends with Mariani. While Ashbrook notes that the general reaction was "dismay at the score's paucity of melody", he does add that Ophelia's funeral march, the "Marcia Funebre", "[won] general approval". While both of Faccio's operas failed to achieve success, the critics were unanimous in their praise of the promise shown in the young composer and, the following contemporary accounts, the audience appears to have shown its pleasure at what they had heard.

On 31 May, the Gazzetta di Genova wrote:

The opera was generally applauded at the end of the first act, at Ofelia and Amleto's duet, at the finale of the second act, at Ofelia's canzone in the third, and at the funeral march of the fourth. The young maestro was called to the stage many times.

That same day, the paper Movimento wrote:

The expectations were high for the premiere, because doubt had circulated the reputation of the new type of music attempted by the young maestro. The public therefore rushed in great numbers and with an attitude of one who wishes to judge with circumspection, and, let us also say, with severity. But from expectations of doubt they changed their mind, and after having waited to think about it, a decision was made; they applauded and applauded with spontaneity, with conscience, with enthusiasm.

Barrese provides "a more personal, if not more biased account [which] comes from Mazzucato and was sent to Faccio's teacher Stafano Ronchetti-Monteviti. The long letter was published in full in the Giornale della Società del Quartetto and in Franco Faccio e Verdi, De Rensis reprints the following selections":

Amleto... aroused unusual and profound emotions in the Genovese public, which celebrated your distinguished student with every type of flattering reception. The curtain-calls for the maestro and the performers were unanimous, insistent, continuous, and ever warmer as the imaginative work unfolded before the eyes of the listeners who were highly surprised with the truth of its conception, the newness of form, the passion of the melodies, the ensemble harmony, and of the robust skill that dominates the whole score. ... As long as we see young Italians give as their second work a creation as serious and strong as that of Amleto, rest assured, my dear colleague, that Italian art is nowhere near death. Amleto's victory was legitimate, and I am happy because I see in it a new consecration of our ideas, and you must be doubly happy for it, and for the triumph of these ideas, and for the pleasure of having educated a powerful talent like Franco Faccio in the Italian art.

Giuseppe Verdi, when he heard of the success of the opera, wrote to the librettist Francesco Maria Piave stating that, "if Faccio succeeds, I am sincerely happy; others will perhaps will not believe this; but [only] others; you know me and you know that I either keep quiet or say what I feel."

=== La Scala revised version ===
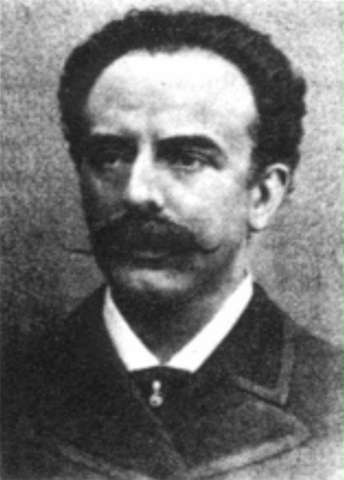
Franco Faccio in later life

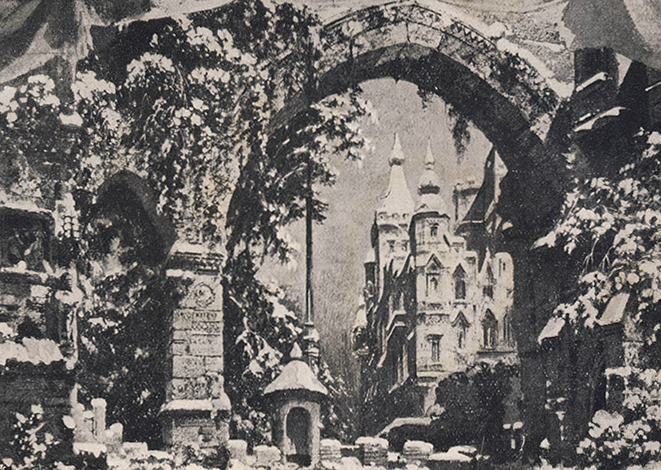
Amleto (1871), act 1 set

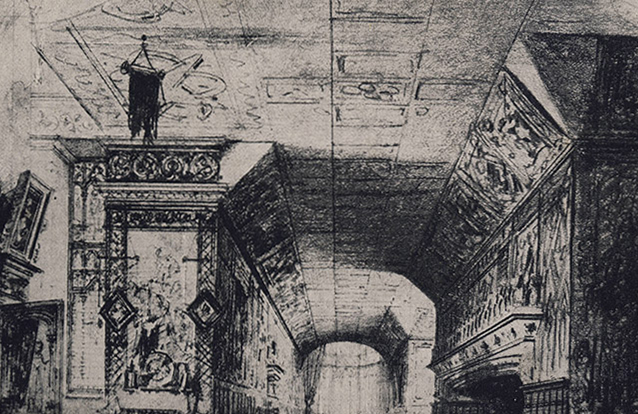
Amleto (1871), act 3 set

After the premiere, Amleto lay dormant for nearly six years while its authors embarked on a number of musical and extra-musical adventures. It was also during these years that Faccio began conducting, which would prove to be his true calling.

However, Amleto was never far from his thoughts, and his friends and family continued to urge him to seek another production. In a letter written on 27 February 1867, his friend the Countess Maffei chided him for missing the opportunity to present Amleto to the Queen of Prussia when he had the chance.

The long-awaited revival was eventually scheduled for the 1870/71 season at La Scala. According to De Rensis, the performance was made possible for one reason: the libretto by Carré and Barbier for the opera Hamlet and written for Ambroise Thomas, was unanimously judged a profanation. For the La Scala production Mario Tiberini returned to interpret the role of Amleto. He was again joined by some of the most famous singers of the time and La Scala's conductor, Eugenio Terziani, yielded the baton to Faccio.

According to De Rensis the rehearsals began smoothly and the dress rehearsal was set for 16 January 1871. The very next day, Tiberini got sick and the opera was postponed for more than 2 weeks. Eventually rehearsals began again, and Tiberini got sick again. A second dress rehearsal was given and the La Scala Theater Commission judged Tiberini fit to sing, despite Faccio's protestations. 12 February saw the opening night, and what was to be the last performance of Amleto. Despite good intentions, Tiberini was completely voiceless that night.

As Barrese notes: "De Rensis writes that the performance was uncertain and disorganized, and describes it as follows":

Tiberini, completely voiceless and disoriented, did not emit one note with the accent of that great artist that he was, he lowered the pitches, and did away with entire phrases. He, and with much visible anguish, rendered comprehension of the opera impossible. Faccio directed, apparently calm but in reality very disturbed. Some ensemble pieces like the dance and brindisi [act 1, scene 1], the violoncello prelude [act 1, scene 2], the Spettro's Racconto [act 1, scene 2], the Pater noster [act 3, scene 1] – which procured Bertolasi two curtain calls – the third act trio, the fourth act funeral march (welcomed with roaring applause and two curtain calls for the composer), saved the production from a shipwreck.

After the performance, Faccio, so disturbed by this fiasco, immediately withdrew the piece, and refused to have it performed again. Although Amleto was never produced again in his lifetime, his student (and later composer himself), Antonio Smareglia, noted that it was always very dear to his heart.

=== 21st century revivals ===
The opera received its first fully staged performance in 143 years on 26 October 2014 at the Journal Theatre in Albuquerque, New Mexico, in a production by Opera Southwest and ran for three performances. The performances were conducted by Anthony Barrese using a critical edition of the score which he had reconstructed from Faccio's autograph manuscript. The principal roles were sung by Alex Richardson (Amleto), Abla Lynn Hamza (Ofelia), Caroline Worra (Geltrude), and Shannon De Vine (Claudio) with stage direction by David Bartholomew. Earlier in October, Barrese had conducted a concert performance of the score with piano accompaniment for Baltimore Concert Opera in Baltimore Maryland, utilizing the same principal cast. In 2015, Opera Southwest's production received a nomination from the International Opera Awards in the Rediscovered Work category. Following a production at the 2016 Bregenz Festival, the first staging in Italy since 1871 was mounted at the Teatro Filarmonico in Faccio's home-town in October 2023, with Angelo Villari in the title role, conducted by Giuseppe Grazioli.

== Roles ==
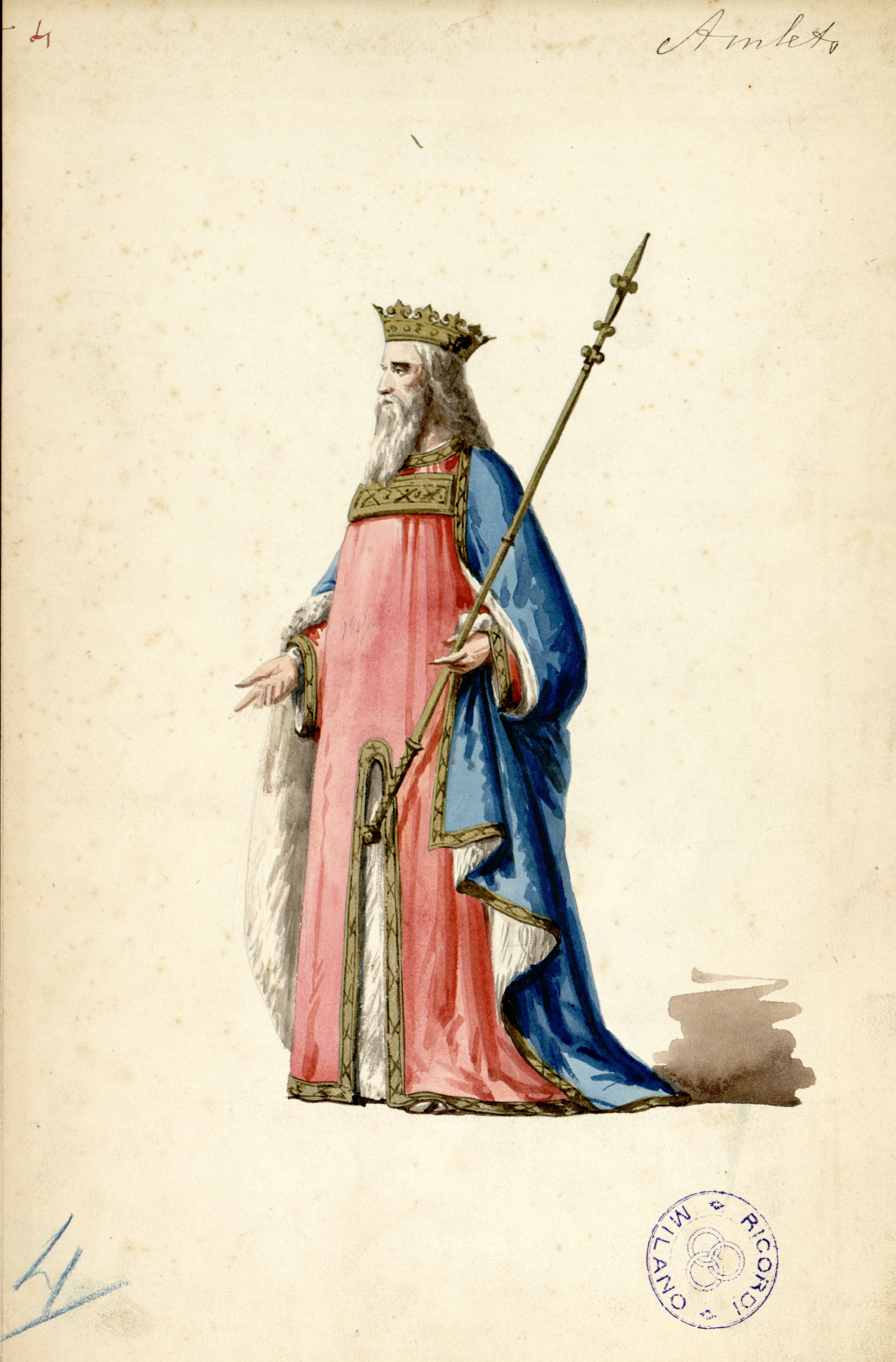
Claudio, costume design for Amleto (1871)

Roles, voice types, premiere cast
Role	Voice type	Premiere cast 30 May 1865 Conductor: Angelo Mariani	Revised version Premiere cast 12 February 1871 Conductor: Franco Faccio
Amleto (Hamlet)	tenor	Mario Tiberini	Mario Tiberini
Ofelia (Ophelia), Polonius' daughter	soprano	Angiolina Ortolani-Tiberini	Virginia Pozzi-Branzanti
Geltrude, (Gertrude), Queen of Denmark and Hamlet's mother	mezzo-soprano	Elena Corani	Marietta Bulli-Paoli
Claudio (Claudius), King of Denmark	baritone	Antonio Cotogni	Zenone Bertolasi
Lo Spettro (The Ghost)	bass	Eraclito Bagagiolo	Ormondo Maini
Laerte (Laertes), Polonius' son	tenor	Napoleone Sinigaglia	Luigi Manfredi
Polonio (Polonius), Lord Chamberlain	bass	Cesare Sonino	Angelo De Giuli
Orazio (Horatio), Hamlet's friend	bass	Antonio Furlani	Augusto Gabrielli
Marcello (Marcellus), Official	baritone	Alessandro Romanelli	Fausto Mola
Un Sacerdote (Priest)	baritone	N.N.	Angelo De Giuli
Un Araldo (Herald)	tenor	Angelo Rocca	
Il Re Gonzaga (King Gonzaga), an actor	tenor	Napoleone Sinigaglia	Luigi Manfredi
La Regina (Queen), an actor	soprano	Angelina Borotti	Ferdinanda Cappelli
Luciano (Lucianus), an actor	bass	Alessandro Romanelli	Fausto Mola
Primo Becchino (First Grave-digger)	bass	Eraclito Bagagiolo	Fausto Mola
Secondo Becchino (Second Grave-digger)	non-speaking	N.N.	N.N.

== Instrumentation ==
2 flutes (2nd doubling piccolo), 2 oboes, (2nd doubling English horn), 2 clarinets, bass clarinet), 2 bassoons; 4 French horns, 2 trumpets, 2 cornets, 3 trombones, cimbasso; timpani, percussion (side drum, triangle, bass drum), tam-tam, glockenspiel; harp; strings. Onstage: Banda, solo string quartet, harp, snare drum

== Synopsis ==
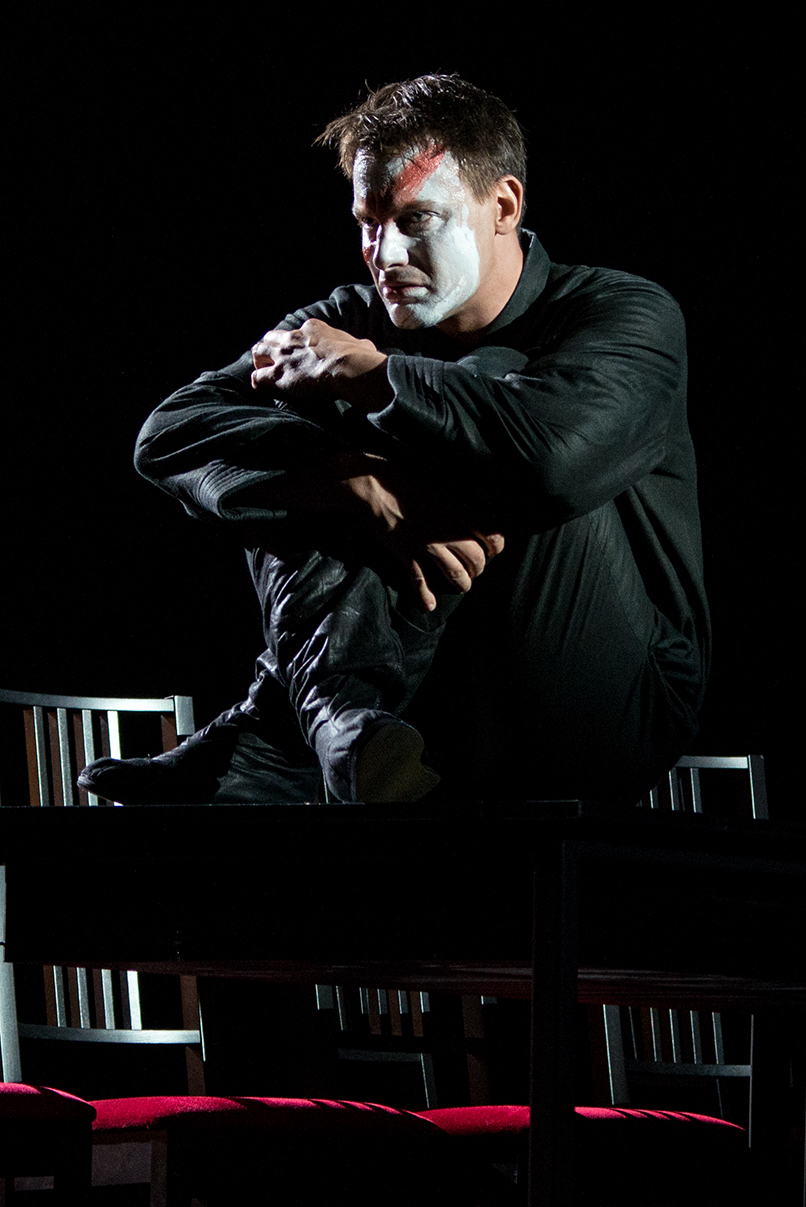
Pavel Černoch as Amleto, Bregenz Festival 2016

=== Act 1 ===
Scene 1

The sudden death of the king and remarriage of his mother Queen Geltrude to his uncle Claudio has depressed Prince Amleto. Still mourning his father and in shock at his mother's strange remarriage, Amleto refuses to take part in the coronation festivities at Elsinore Castle (Ah, si dissolva quest'abbietta carne). Ofelia reminds him of love's eternal power (Dubita pur che brillino). Amleto's friend Orazio and Marcello, a sentry, arrive, having seen the ghost of Amleto's father walking the castle at night. The three decide to keep watch for the ghost.

Scene 2

Amleto, Orazio, and Marcello keep watch from a castle parapet. The ghost appears, indicating that he wishes to speak to Amleto alone (Tu dêi sapere ch'io son l'anima lesa). Revealing that his brother, Claudio, murdered him and took his crown, he implores Amleto to avenge him. Amleto swears revenge and compels his friends not to reveal what they have seen that night.

=== Act 2 ===
Scene 1

In the castle, Lord Chamberlain Polonio, Ofelia's father, tries to convince Claudio and Geltrude that Amleto's melancholy is a symptom of his love for Ofelia. The three withdraw, and Amleto enters, meditating on suicide (Essere o non essere / "To be or not to be"). Ofelia enters and tries to return some tokens that he had given her. Feigning madness, Amleto demands that she renounce worldly love and enter a convent (Fatti monachella) and decries marriage. A group of travelling singers arrives and Amleto decides to have them stage a play depicting a regicide similar to his father's, so he can observe Claudio's reaction.

Scene 2

The court gathers for the play, and Amleto instructs Orazio and Marcello to watch Claudio closely. Amleto calls the play The Trap (la trappola), but assures everyone that there is nothing offensive in it. As the play progresses, Claudio becomes increasingly agitated (Regina nel core), while Geltrude admonishes his foolish behavior. At the play's climax, Claudio runs from the room, horrified. Amleto revels in the success of his plan (Viva la trappola!)

=== Act 3 ===
Scene 1

Alone in his chambers, Claudio is overcome by remorse (O nera colpa!). Amleto enters and is about to strike, but realizes that if he kills Claudio in prayer, Claudio will be sent to heaven. Desiring a more opportune moment, he withdraws. Claudio prays (O Padre nostro), but at the conclusion, he recants and exits.

Polonio enters with Geltrude, and urges her to calm Amleto. As Amleto approaches, Polonio hides behind a tapestry. Amleto and his mother argue and Amleto threatens her. Polonio cries for help. Believing Claudio is hiding behind the tapestry, Amleto stabs Polonio, realizing his error too late. In his delirium, Amleto rails against the king's wickedness (O re ladrone). The ghost enters, ordering Amleto to focus on vengeance. Amleto begs the ghost for forgiveness (Celesti spirti! o lugubre). Geltrude, who does not see the ghost, believes that Amleto has gone mad.

Amleto withdraws, and Geltrude privately admits her guilt (Ah! che alfine all'empio scherno).

Scene 2

Laerte storms the castle, demanding justice for the murder of his father, Polonio. Claudio calms him, and the two watch in horror as Ofelia enters, now insane, imagining her father's funeral (la bara involta). Claudio informs Laerte that Amleto killed Polonio; Laerte swears revenge, and both exit. Hearing the name "Amleto", Ofelia descends deeper into her madness (Bell'alberel dolente), eventually drowning herself in a brook.

=== Act 4 ===
Scene 1

Two gravediggers are busy at work, preparing for a funeral (Oggi a me, domani a te). Amleto and Orazio enter and banter with one of the gravediggers. Hearing a crowd approach, they hide. A lengthy funeral procession enters, bearing Ofelia's body. Laerte curses Amleto (Che Iddio scaraventi l'ardente saetta), who then reveals himself. Amleto and Laerte briefly fight. Amleto claims that he loved Ofelia (Io quella morta amai). Claudio urges Laerte to come away, referencing a secret plan to deal with Amleto.

Scene 2 (only extant in the original 1865 version)

A herald announces to the court that Amleto and Laerte will fence for sport (Illustri cortigiani e cavalieri). Laerte assures Claudio that the tip of his sword is poisoned. Amleto publicly apologizes to Laerte, claiming temporary insanity. Both men begin their duel and when Amleto gains a point, Claudio offers a toast, urging Amleto to drink from his cup (La coppa è colma). Busy with the duel, Amleto declines, while Geltrude murmurs to Claudio that she knows the cup is filled with poison. After Amleto gains another point, Claudio offers Amleto a drink again, but Geltrude seizes the cup, drinks, and faints. While Amleto is distracted, Laerte wounds him with the poisoned sword. Enraged, Amleto disarms his opponent, switches swords with Laerte, and wounds him. Laerte confesses that he is dying, a victim of his own undoing, and that Claudio's cup was poisoned. Amleto stabs Claudio, before dying himself.

== Preparation of the critical edition of Amleto ==
After the La Scala revival in 1871 the opera was not performed again until 2014.

However, conductor Anthony Barrese, who has worked at the Sarasota Opera and the Dallas Opera, and who is artistic director and principal conductor of Opera Southwest in Albuquerque, New Mexico, developed an interest in this opera in the early 2000s and, from 2003, researched and (in conjunction with the publishing house Casa Ricordi) prepared and edited a critical edition of the opera from a variety of sources, including a newly discovered libretto from the 1871 staging.

By the end of 2004, Barrese had edited the Amleto score, and presented a scene from act 3 of the work on stage by apprentice singers at the Sarasota Opera, thereby allowing a re-evaluation of its merits; he had also completed the critical notes associated with the score. Barrese presented the "Marcia funebre" with the Dallas Opera Orchestra for a family concert in 2007. This part of the opera is presented in Corfu each year during Easter, when the band of Philharmonic Society of Corfu performs it during the epitaph litany of Saint Spyridon on the morning of Holy Saturday.

== Recordings ==
In 2014, Opera Southwest released the world premiere recording of Amleto.

Year	Cast (Amleto, Ofelia, Claudio, Geltrude, Lo Spettro, Polonio)	Conductor, opera house and orchestra	Label
2014	Alex Richardson, Abla Lynn Hamza, Shannon DeVine, Caroline Worra, Jeffrey Beruan, Matthew Curran	Anthony Barrese, Opera Southwest Orchestra, Opera Southwest Chorus (Recorded live, National Hispanic Cultural Center, October 2014)	CD: Opera Southwest; Cat:888295410748
2016	Pavel Černoch, Iulia Maria Dan, Claudio Sgura, Dshamilja Kaiser, Gianluca Buratto, Eduard Tsanga	Paolo Carignani, Vienna Symphony Orchestra, Prague Philharmonic Chorus (Recorded live, Bregenzer Festspiele, 18 July 2016; stage director: Olivier Tambosi)	Blu-ray: C Major; CD: Naxos

== See also ==
- Amleth, a figure in a medieval Scandinavian legend, the direct inspiration of the character of Prince Hamlet
