= Claire Meghnagi =

Israeli singer (born 1977)

- קלייר מכתנאגי
- Born: 1977 (age 47–48); Israel
- Education: Rubin Academy of Music
- Occupation: Soprano

Claire Meghnagi (Hebrew: קלייר מכתנאגי; born 1977) is an Israeli operatic soprano of Italian origin.

== Biography ==
Claire Meghnagi was born in Israel in 1977 to Italian-born cantor Isacco Meghnagi. She studied at Rubin Academy of Music (now the Buchmann-Mehta School of Music) in Tel Aviv. After graduation, Meghnagi continued her studies in Boston and New York. Her works included Tullia in Bononcini's Il trionfo di Camilla, Le Feu/La Princesse in L'enfant et les sortilèges, Granddaughter in The Rat Laughed for Israeli Chamber Orchestra, Zerlina in Don Giovanni, staged in Haifa, Despina in Così fan tutte, La Bergère in Armide, Prima Cercatrice in Suor Angelica in Israeli Opera, First Innocent in The Minotaur in Royal Opera House in London. She participated in Vocal Fantasy Festival in Jerusalem in 2017.

== Notable performances ==
- Aci, Galatea e Polifemo by George Frideric Handel. As Aci. With Les Arts Florissants (ensemble)
