= Mario Tiberini =

Italian opera singer

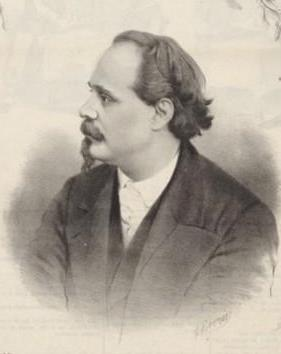
Mario Tiberini, circa 1870

Mario Tiberini (8 September 1826 – 16 October 1880) was an Italian tenor who sang leading roles in the opera houses of Europe and the Americas in a career spanning 25 years. Known for his advanced singing technique and dramatic ability, he sang the role of Alvaro in the premiere of the revised (and now standard) version of Verdi's La forza del destino and created several roles in operas by lesser-known composers, including the title role in Faccio's Amleto.

== Life and career ==
Tiberini was born in San Lorenzo in Campo in Italy's Marche region. After study in Rome with Domenico Lucilla and in Naples with Emanuele de Roxas, he made his stage debut in 1851 as Idreno in Rossini's Semiramide at Rome's Teatro Argentina. He performed in a few provincial theatres in Italy until 1854 when he toured North and South America with Italian opera companies. He also gave solo concerts in New York and Boston launched by the opera impresario Bernard Ullman who billed Tiberini as a descendant of the Roman Emperor Tiberius.

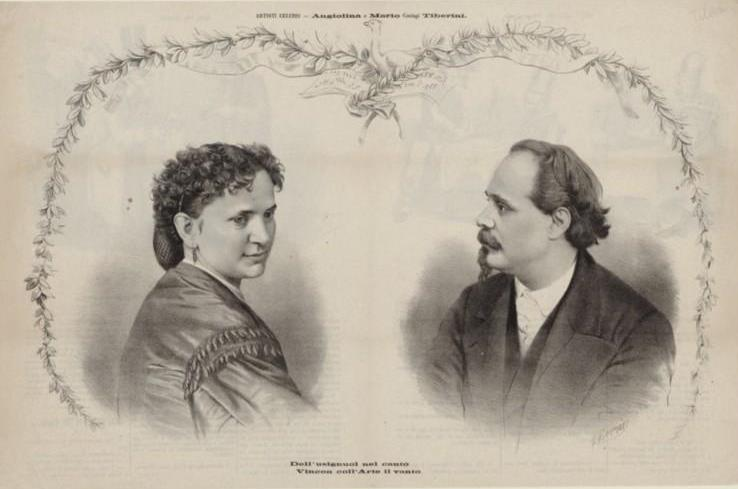
Angiolina and Mario Tiberini

After his return to Europe in 1858, Tiberini was engaged as primo tenore at the Gran Teatre del Liceu in Barcelona. There he met and fell in love with the soprano Angiolina Ortolani who was singing the title role in Linda di Chamounix. They married soon after and for the rest of their careers, appeared together in many operas. By 1875, Tiberini's voice began showing signs of decline, and shortly afterwards he also began showing symptoms of mental illness. He spent his final days in a sanatorium in Reggio Emilia where he died at the age of 54. An inscription on a lithograph in the Biblioteca Trivulziana in Milan states that he died believing he was Manrico, the protagonist of Il trovatore. However, according to Denise Gallo writing in The Cambridge Verdi Encyclopedia, there is no mention of this delusion in the records of the asylum, and it may well be a theatrical legend.

Tiberini was buried in the Cimitero Monumentale di Milano. The funerary sculpture on his grave is by Pietro Fumeo (1831–1898) and depicts a broken column entwined with ivy. The inscription lists his greatest roles: Edgardo, Arturo, Corradino, Raul, Lohengrin, and Alvaro. In 1880, four months after his death, the Teatro Trionfo in San Lorenzo in Campo was renamed the Teatro Mario Tiberini in his honour as was the street on which it stands.

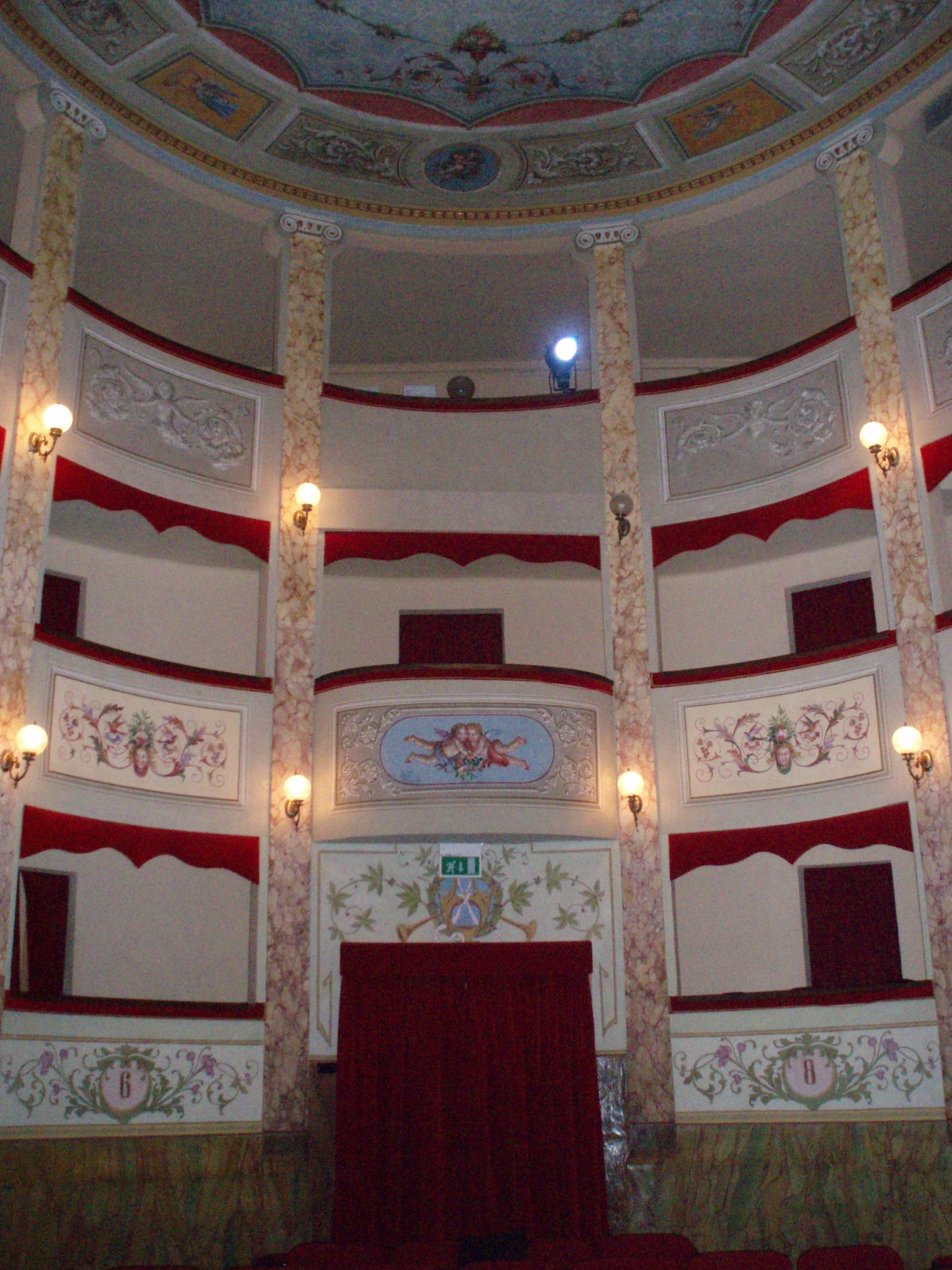
Interior of the Teatro Mario Tiberini in San Lorenzo in Campo

== Roles created ==
- Arnaldo in Nicolás Guañabens' Arnaldo de Erill, Gran Teatre del Liceu, Barcelona, 12 May 1859
- Gino in Achille Peri's L'espiazione, La Scala, Milan, 7 February 1861
- Amleto in Franco Faccio's Amleto, Teatro Carlo Felice, Genoa, 30 May 1865
- Romeo in Filippo Marchetti's Romeo e Giulietta, Teatro Grande, Trieste, 25 October 1865
- Don Diego in Giovanni Pacini's Don Diego de' Mendoza, La Fenice, Venice, 12 January 1867
- Comte d'Alteriva in Józef Poniatowski's La contessina, Théâtre des Italiens, Paris, 28 April 1868
- Ruy Blas in Filippo Marchetti's Ruy Blas, La Scala, Milan, 3 April 1869
