= Opera Southwest =

Opera company in New Mexico

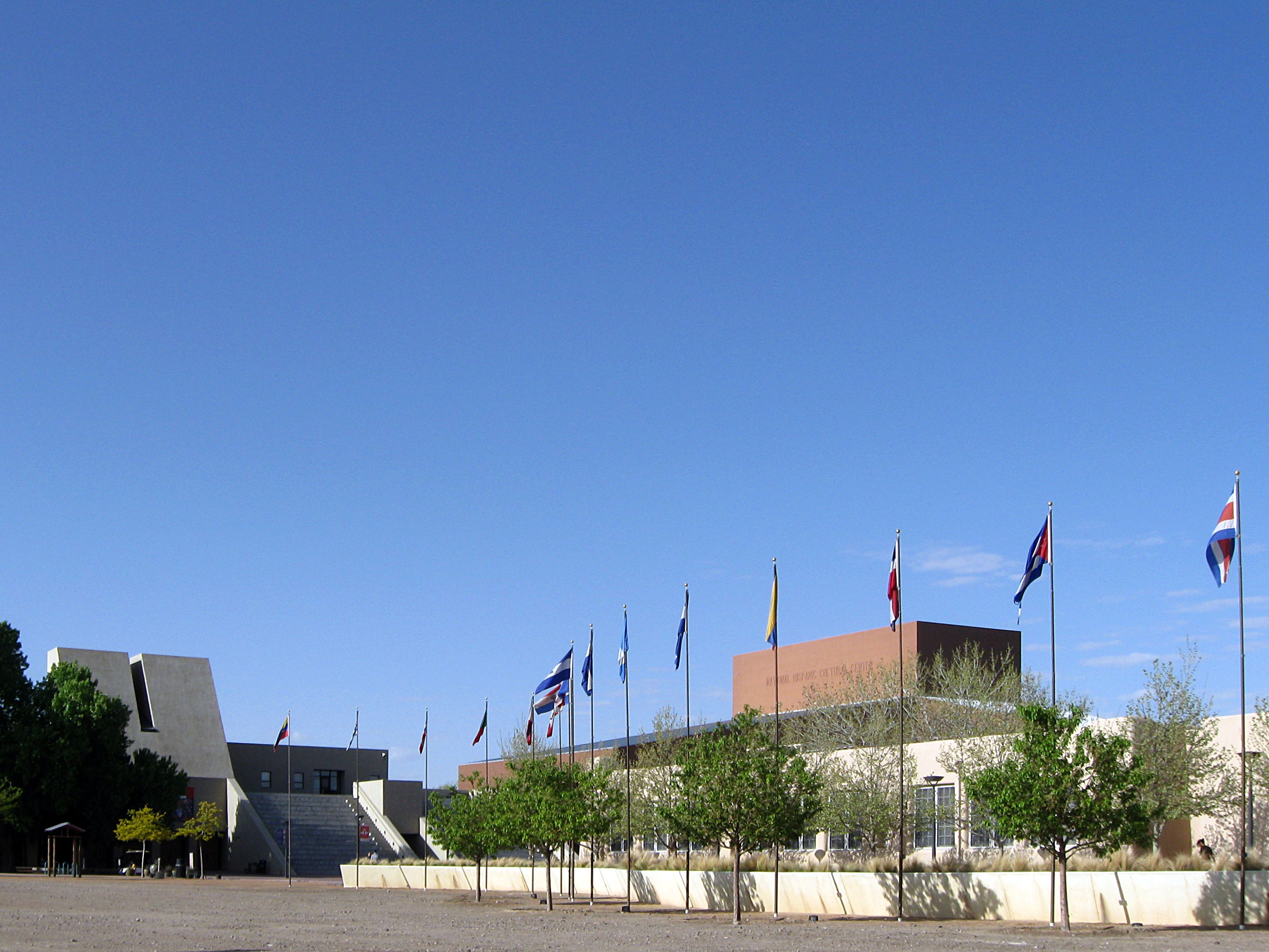
The National Hispanic Cultural Center in Albuquerque, 2010

Opera Southwest (formerly known as Albuquerque Opera Theatre) is an American professional opera company based in Albuquerque, New Mexico. Founded in 1972, it has presented many world premieres of new operas in addition to the standard repertoire. In 2015, its production of Franco Faccio's Amleto, the opera's first performance in 143 years, was a finalist in the International Opera Awards. Anthony Barrese, who joined the company in 2007 as music director, has been its artistic director and principal conductor since 2011. Its artistic director emeritus is David Bartholomew.

== History ==
The company was founded in 1972 by a group that included Edward T. Peter and the conductors Kurt Frederick (the company's first music director), and James Bratcher. Bratcher, a former tenor and later choral conductor, served as the company's artistic and music director from 1979 to 1987 and again in the mid-1990s. The company's first production, Così fan tutte, was staged in January 1973 in the University of New Mexico's Popejoy Hall. From the early 1980s, the newly restored KiMo Theater was a regular performing venue for the company. In 2009, the Opera Southwest received the Albuquerque Arts Alliance Bravo Award and concluded its season at the KiMo Theatre with the company's first performance of Lucia di Lammermoor. It now performs at the Albuquerque Journal Theatre (part of the National Hispanic Cultural Center) where it stages two to three opera productions per year.

While the majority of Opera Southwest's productions have been from the standard operatic repertoire, the company has regularly presented both new and relatively rarely performed works. These include: Bononcini's Polifemo (1982), a zarzuela double bill of Ruperto Chapí's La revoltosa and Tomás Bretón's La verbena de la Paloma (1993), revivals of Henry Mollicone's The Starbird and The Face on the Barroom Floor (2004/2005), Rossini's Otello (2012), and Franco Faccio's Amleto (2014). The first of the three performances of Otello presented both the original and the alternative "happy" ending. Prior to the second and third performances, the audience voted for the ending they preferred, and the chosen version was then performed. On 26 October 2014, Faccio's forgotten opera Amleto was given its American premiere and its first fully staged performance in 143 years by Opera Southwest. The performances were conducted by Anthony Barrese using a critical edition of the score which he had reconstructed from Faccio's original manuscript. In 2015, the production was nominated for the International Opera Awards in the Rediscovered Work category.

== World premieres ==
Opera Southwest has staged multiple world premieres of new operas, most of them by New Mexico-based composers. These include:

- James (Santa Fe) Galloway
  - Pastoral (1988)
  - A Solid House (1998)
  - Rococo Confessional (1999)
  - Mirage (2003)
- Alan Stringer
  - Coyote's Music (1999)
  - Miraculous Staircase (1996)
  - A Sunny Morning (1998)
  - A Circle of Love (2004)
- Robert Tate
  - A Closed Case (1998)

Ethan Greene's A Way Home, first performed in Houston in 2010, premiered in its revised and orchestrated version at Opera Southwest in 2012. It was the first winner of the company's biennial Brabson Composers’ Competition for new operas for families and young audiences.
