= Angiolina Ortolani-Tiberini =

Italian opera singer

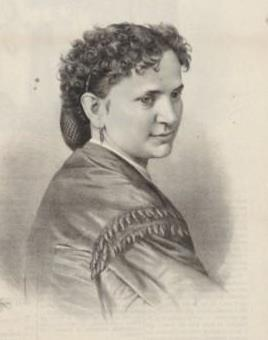
Angiolina Ortolani-Tiberini

Angiolina Ortolani-Tiberini (10 May 1834 – 31 December 1913) was an Italian soprano who sang many leading roles in European opera houses during a career spanning over twenty years. After their marriage in 1858, her career was closely entwined with that of her husband, the tenor Mario Tiberini, with the couple often appearing together on stage. Amongst the roles she created was Ofelia in Franco Faccio's Amleto.

== Life and career ==
Ortolani-Tiberini was born Maria Angela Ortolani Valandris in the northern Italian city of Bergamo where her father owned an osteria. She studied singing at the Milan Conservatory under Francesco Lamperti with the encouragement of the composer and fellow citizen of Bergamo, Gaetano Donizetti, who heard her singing as a young girl in the Osteria dei Tre Gobbi. She made her stage debut to great success in the title role of Donizetti's Parisina at the Teatro Riccardi in Bergamo on 23 August 1853.

She sang leading roles for another five seasons at the Teatro Ricciardi as well as commencing an international career. In 1858, while appearing in the title role in Linda di Chamounix at the Gran Teatre del Liceu in Barcelona, she met and fell in love with the leading tenor Mario Tiberini. They married soon after and for the rest of their careers, appeared together in many operas throughout Italy as well as in London's Royal Opera House, the Vienna State Opera, and theatres in Spain, Russia, and the United States. Following her marriage, she appeared under the surname Ortolani-Tiberini.

After her husband was stricken with mental illness in 1876, she largely retired from the stage to care for him. However, she returned to Bergamo in 1884 to sing Rosina in The Barber of Seville, when the theatre's season had been compromised by the loss of their lead soprano. She spent her later years at her villa in Ardenza (near Livorno) where she died at the age of 79, survived by her sons Arturo, Corradino, and Mario. She is buried beside her husband (who had died in 1880) in the Cimitero Monumentale di Milano.

== Roles created ==
- Constanza in Nicolás Guañabens' Arnaldo de Erill, Gran Teatre del Liceu, Barcelona, 12 May 1859
- Ofelia in Franco Faccio's Amleto, Teatro Carlo Felice, Genoa, 30 May 1865
- Giulietta in Filippo Marchetti's Romeo e Giulietta, Teatro Grande, Trieste, 25 October 1865
