= Barlow maneuver =

Test for hip dysplasia in infants

- Purpose: screen for developmental dysplasia of hip

The Barlow maneuver is a physical examination performed on infants to screen for developmental dysplasia of the hip. It is named for Dr. Thomas Geoffrey Barlow (September 25, 1915 – May 25, 1975), an English orthopedic surgeon, who devised this test. It was clinically tested during 1957–1962 at Hope Hospital, Salford, Lancashire.

== Procedure ==
The maneuver is easily performed by adducting the hip (bringing the thigh towards the midline) while applying pressure on the knee, directing the force posteriorly.

== Interpretation ==
If the hip is dislocatable — that is, if the hip can be popped out of socket with this maneuver — the test is considered positive. The Ortolani maneuver is then used to confirm the positive finding (i.e., that the hip actually dislocated).

The latest evidence suggests that clinical tests are not sufficiently reliable for diagnosing developmental dysplasia of the hip.

== See also ==
- Hip dysplasia (human)
