= Ortolan =

Ortolan may refer to:

== Animals ==
- Ortolan bunting (Emberiza hortulana), a bird in the bunting family Emberizidae considered a delicacy in France.

== Cuisine ==
- L'Ortolan, a gourmet restaurant in the village of Shinfield, Berkshire, England
- Ortolan (restaurant), a defunct Michelin-starred restaurant in Los Angeles, California

== People ==
- Joseph Louis Elzéar Ortolan (1802–1873), a French jurist
- Marcel Augusto Ortolan (born 1981), a Brazilian footballer

== U.S. Navy ships ==
- USS Ortolan (AM-45), a Lapwing-class minesweeper in the United States Navy
- USS Ortolan (AMCU-34) earned four battle stars during World War II
- USS Ortolan (ASR-22), a twin-hulled submarine rescue ship

== Other uses ==
- Ortolan, an alien race in Star Wars
- De ortolaan, a novel by Dutch author Maarten 't Hart

== See also ==
- Ortolani (disambiguation)
