= Marino Ortolani =

Italian pediatrician

Marino Ortolani (26 July 1904 in Altedo, Malalbergo, Province of Bologna, Italy; † 1983) was an Italian pediatrician who developed a clinical test for the recognition of hip dysplasia called the Ortolani test.
