= Olivier Tambosi =

Austrian opera and theatre director

Olivier Tambosi (born 7 July 1963) is an Austrian opera and operetta director.

== Life and career ==
Born in Paris, Tambosi studied music theatre direction at the University of Vienna. Philosophy and Theology, and at the University of Music and Performing Arts Vienna.

In 1990, he founded the Neue Oper Wien (artistic director until 1993). Subsequently, he was head of musical theatre at the Stadttheater Klagenfurt until 1996. Since 1996 he has made guest appearances internationally as a director and has worked among others with conductors Philippe Auguin, John Axelrod, Bruno Bartoletti, Jiří Bělohlávek, Dietfried Bernet, Daniele Callegari, Paolo Carignani, Frédéric Chaslin, James Conlon, Dennis Russell Davies, Mark Elder, Mikko Franck, Bernard Haitink, Jakub Hrůša, Vladimir Jurowski, Karen Kamensek, Peter Keuschnig, Axel Kober, Walter Kobéra, Nicola Luisotti, Jun Märkl, Seiji Ozawa, Antonio Pappano, Donald Runnicles, Peter Schneider, Patrick Summers, Alexander Soddy.

Among the singers Tambosi has worked with are Marcelo Álvarez, Daniela Barcellona, Joseph Calleja, Barbara Frittoli, Ferruccio Furlanetto, Lucio Gallo, Vladimir Galouzin, Eric Halfvarsson, Dmitri Hvorostovsky, Angelika Kirchschlager, Éva Marton, Karita Mattila, Deborah Polaski, Neil Shicoff, Anja Silja, Nina Stemme, Bryn Terfel, Ramón Vargas, Christopher Ventris, Linda Watson and Eva-Maria Westbroek.

His engagements have taken him in Austria among others to the Graz Opera, the Landestheater Linz, the Vienna Volksoper and the Bregenz Festival, in Germany to the Staatsoper Hannover, the Staatstheater am Gärtnerplatz Munich, in Europe at the Liceu Barcelona, the Royal Opera House Covent Garden, National Opera Helsinki, the Strasbourg Opera and to the Lucerne Festival, the Theater Biel Solothurn, in America to the Metropolitan Opera New York, to Chicago, Houston, San Francisco Opera and Los Angeles, San Diego Opera as well as to the Saito Kinen Festival in Japan.

Tambosi is married with the Swiss soprano Christiane Boesiger (born 1966 in Zürich).

== Mises en scene ==
Henry Purcell

- King Arthur

Georg Philipp Telemann

- Pimpinone

Giovanni Battista Pergolesi

- La serva padrona

Christoph Willibald Gluck

- Orfeo ed Euridice

Joseph Haydn

- La fedeltà premiata

Antonio Salieri

- Prima la musica e poi le parole

Wolfgang Amadeus Mozart

- Bastien und Bastienne
- Idomeneo
- Die Entführung aus dem Serail
- Le nozze di Figaro
- Don Giovanni
- Così fan tutte
- Die Zauberflöte

Luigi Cherubini

- Médée

Gaetano Donizetti

- L'elisir d'amore
- Don Pasquale
- Lucia di Lammermoor
- Maria Stuarda

Richard Wagner

- Tristan und Isolde
- Die Meistersinger von Nürnberg

Giuseppe Verdi

- Luisa Miller
- Macbeth
- Rigoletto
- La traviata
- Un ballo in maschera
- Otello
- Falstaff

Jacques Offenbach

- The Tales of Hoffmann

Johann Strauss II

- Die Fledermaus

Georges Bizet

- Carmen Project

Franco Faccio

- Amleto

Arrigo Boito

- Nerone

Carl Millöcker

- Gasparone

Engelbert Humperdinck

- Hänsel und Gretel

Oscar Wilde

- De Profundis (Schauspiel)

Ruggero Leoncavallo

- Pagliacci

Giacomo Puccini

- Manon Lescaut
- La Bohème
- Madama Butterfly

Pietro Mascagni

- Cavalleria rusticana

Leoš Janáček

- Jenůfa
- Věc Makropulos

Claude Debussy

- Pelléas et Mélisande

Richard Strauss

- Der Rosenkavalier

Franz Lehár

- Die lustige Witwe

Alexander von Zemlinsky

- Der Zwerg
- Eine florentinische Tragödie

Arnold Schönberg

- Pierrot Lunaire

Arnold Schönberg, Kurt Weill

- Cabaret Songs

Ermanno Wolf-Ferrari

- Il segreto di Susanna

Franz Schreker

- Irrelohe

Alban Berg

- Wozzeck
- Lulu

Emmerich Kálmán

- Gräfin Mariza

Eduard Künneke

- Der Vetter aus Dingsda

Igor Stravinsky

- The Rake’s Progress

Darius Milhaud

- Le pauvre matelot

Francis Poulenc

- La voix humaine

Karl Amadeus Hartmann

- Simplicius Simplicissimus

Gian Carlo Menotti

- The Telephone

Benjamin Britten

- Death in Venice
- A Midsummer Night's Dream

Astor Piazzolla

- María de Buenos Aires

Mitch Leigh/Dale Wasserman

- Man of La Mancha

Stephen Sondheim

- Sweeney Todd
- Into the Woods

Dieter Kaufmann

- Die Reise ins Paradies
- Dolores

Andrew Lloyd Webber

- Joseph and the Amazing Technicolor Dreamcoat

Bruno Strobl

- Hier ist es schön

Kaija Saariaho

- L’amour de loin

Zesses Seglias

- To the Lighthouse

Sehyung Kim

- Consumnia
