= Hip dysplasia =

Joint abnormality

- Other names: Developmental dysplasia of the hip (DDH), developmental dislocation of the hip, congenital dysplasia of the hip (CDH)
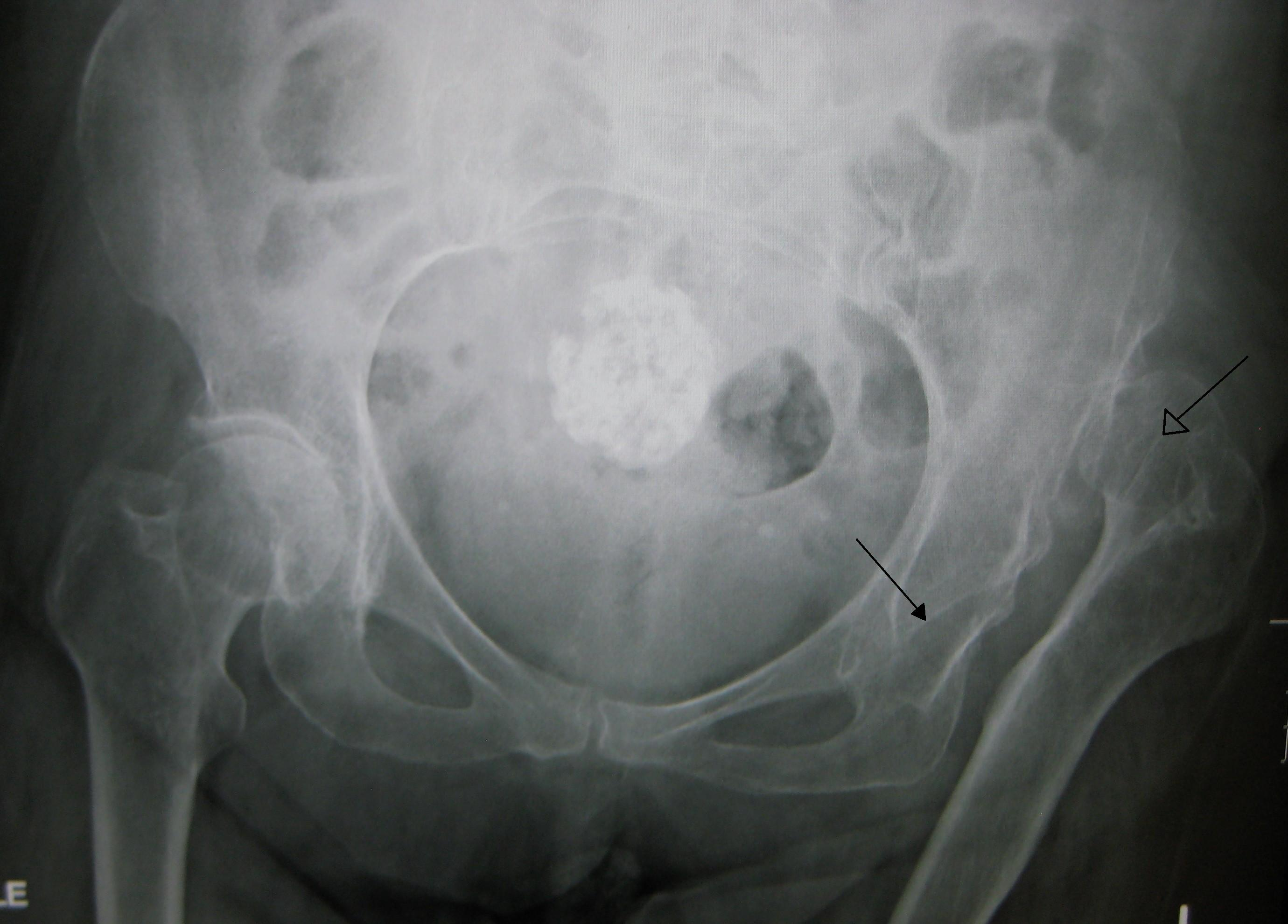
- Congenital dislocation of the left hip in an elderly person. Closed arrow marks the acetabulum, open arrow the femoral head.
- Specialty: Pediatrics, orthopedics
- Symptoms: None, hip aches, one leg shorter, limping
- Complications: Arthritis
- Risk factors: Family history, swaddling, breech birth
- Diagnostic method: Physical exam, ultrasound
- Treatment: Bracing, casting, surgery
- Prognosis: Good (if detected early)
- Frequency: 1 in 1,000 (term babies)

Hip dysplasia is an abnormality of the hip joint where the socket portion does not fully cover the ball portion, resulting in an increased risk for joint dislocation. Hip dysplasia may occur at birth or develop in early life. Regardless, it does not typically produce symptoms in babies less than a year old. Occasionally one leg may be shorter than the other. The left hip is more often affected than the right. Complications without treatment can include arthritis, limping, and low back pain. Females are affected more often than males. Risk factors for hip dysplasia include female sex, family history, certain swaddling practices, and breech presentation whether an infant is delivered vaginally or by cesarean section. If one identical twin is affected, there is a 40% risk the other will also be affected. Screening all babies for the condition by physical examination is recommended. Ultrasonography may also be useful.

Many of those with mild instability resolve without specific treatment. In more significant cases, if detected early, bracing may be all that is required. In cases that are detected later, surgery and casting may be needed. About 7.5% of hip replacements are done to treat problems which have arisen from hip dysplasia.

About 1 in 1,000 babies have hip dysplasia. Hip instability of meaningful importance occurs in one to two percent of babies born at term. Females are affected more often than males. Hip dysplasia was described at least as early as the 300s BC by Hippocrates.

== Signs and symptoms ==
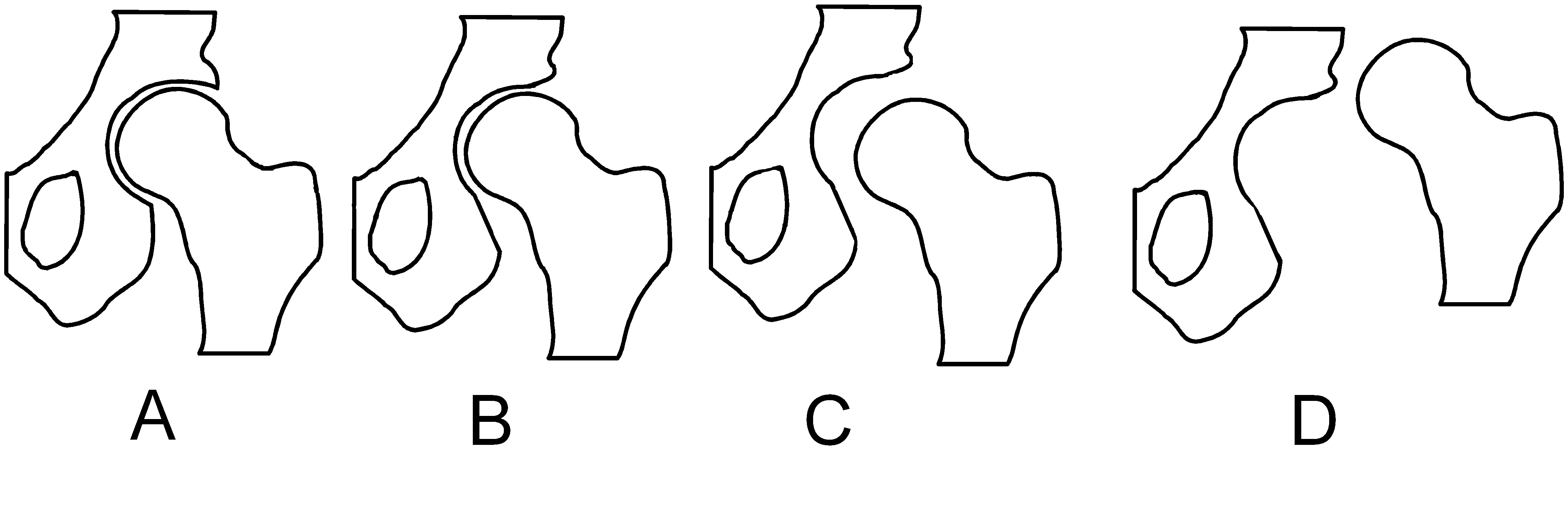
Types of misalignments of femur head to socket in hip dysplasia. A: Normal. B: Dysplasia. C: Subluxation. D: Luxation

Hip dysplasia can range from barely detectable to severely malformed or dislocated. The congenital form, teratologic or non-reducible dislocation occurs as part of more complex conditions.

The condition can be bilateral or unilateral:

- If both hip joints are affected, one speaks of "bilateral" dysplasia. In this case, some diagnostic indicators like asymmetric folds and leg-length inequality do not apply.
- In unilateral dysplasia only one joint shows deformity, the opposite side may show resulting effects. In the majority of unilateral cases, the left hip has the dysplasia.

If the joint is fully dislocated a false acetabulum often forms (often higher up on the pelvis) opposite the dislocated femoral head position.

In acetabular dysplasia, the acetabulum (socket) is too shallow or deformed. The center-edge angle is measured as described by Wiberg. Two forms of femoral dysplasia are coxa vara, in which the femur head grows at too narrow an angle to the shaft, and coxa valga, in which the angle is too wide.

A rare type, the "Beukes familial hip dysplasia" is found among Afrikaners that are members of the Beukes family. The femur head is flat and irregular. People develop osteoarthritis at an early age.

== Causes ==
Hip dysplasia is considered to be a multifactorial condition. That means that several factors are involved in causing the condition to manifest.

The cause of the condition is unknown; however, some factors of congenital hip dislocation are through heredity and racial background. It is also thought that the higher rates in some ethnic groups (such as some Native American groups) is due to the practice of swaddling of infants, which is known to be a potential risk factor for developing dysplasia. It also has a low risk in African Americans and southern Chinese.

=== Congenital ===
Some studies suggest a hormonal link. Specifically, the hormone relaxin has been indicated.

Female sex, alone without other known risk factors, accounts for 75%. A genetic factor is indicated since the trait runs in families and there is an increased occurrence in some ethnic populations (e.g., Native Americans, Sami people). A locus has been described on chromosome 13. Beukes familial dysplasia, on the other hand, was found to map to an 11-cM region on chromosome 4q35, with nonpenetrant carriers not affected. Further risk factors include, gender, genetics (family history), and firstborns.

=== Acquired ===
In the breech position the femoral head tends to get pushed out of the socket and the breech position is probably the most important single risk factor, whether an infant is delivered vaginally or by cesarean section.

As an acquired condition it has been linked to traditions of swaddling infants, use of overly restrictive baby seats, carriers and other methods of transporting babies, or use of a cradle board which locks the hip joint in an "adducted" position (pulling the knees together tends to pull the heads of the femur bone out of the sockets or acetabula) for extended periods. Modern swaddling techniques, such as the 'hip healthy swaddle' have been developed to relieve stress on hip joints caused by traditional swaddling methods.

== Screening and diagnosis ==
α and β angles used in hip ultrasound

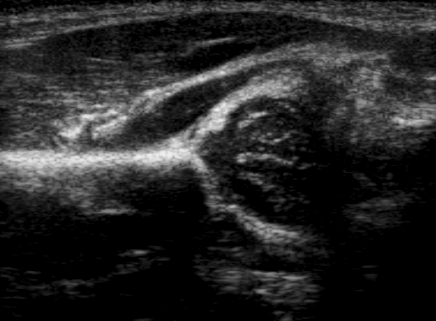
Hip ultrasound

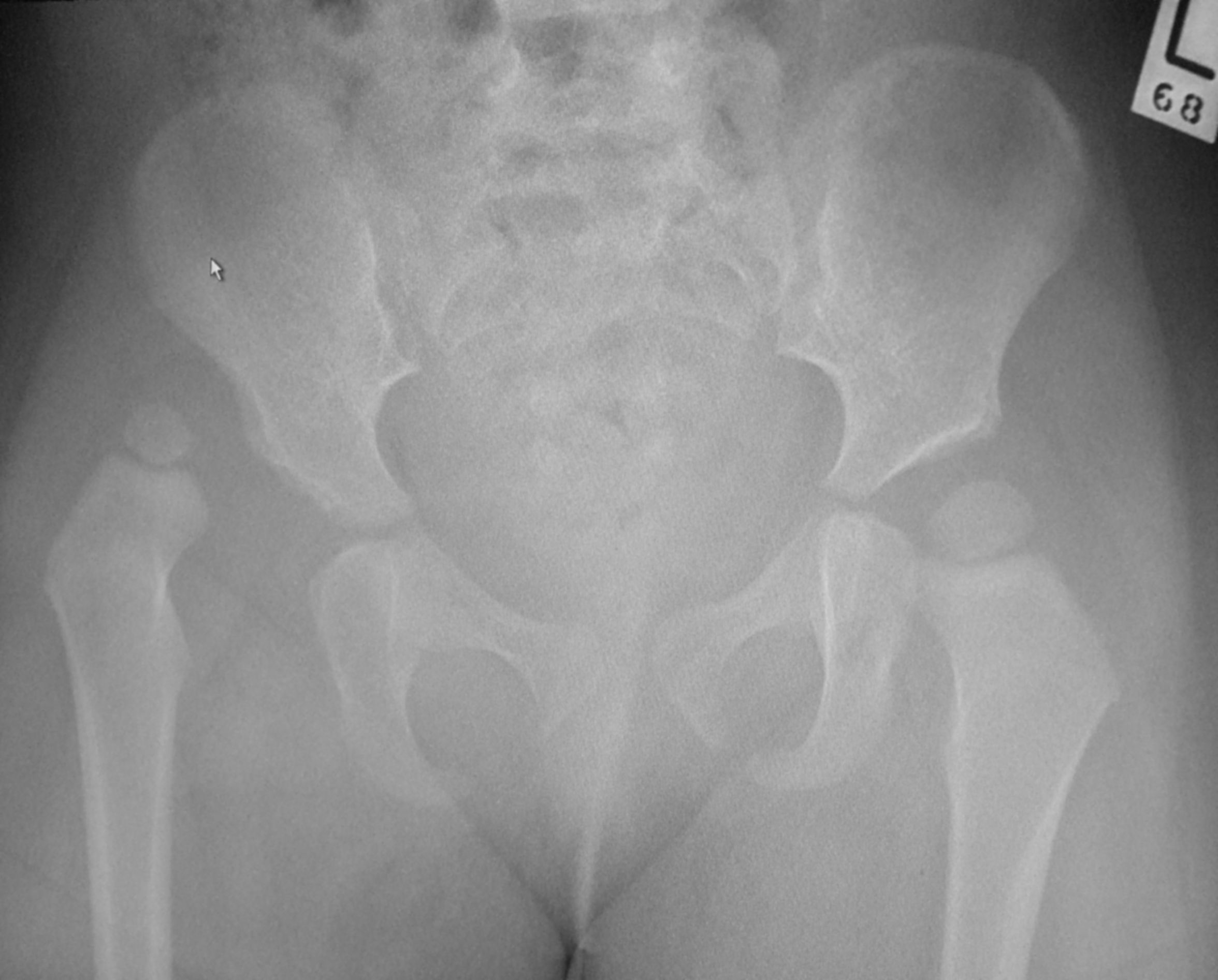
X-Ray Image showing hip dysplasia in a baby

All newborns should be screened for congenital hip dysplasia. The screening examination techniques to detect hip dysplasia in newborns include observation for

- asymmetry of legs and asymmetrical gluteal folds
- limb length discrepancy (evaluated by placing the child in a supine position with the hips and knees flexed [unequal knee heights might be noticed – the Galeazzi sign]), and
- restricted hip abduction.

Sometimes during an exam a "click" or more precisely "clunk" in the hip may be detected (although not all clicks indicate hip dysplasia). When a hip click (also known as "clicky hips" in the UK) is detected, the child's hips are tracked with additional screenings to determine if developmental dysplasia of the hip is caused. However, new UK guidelines published in April 2021 have stated that isolated clicks are no longer considered clinically significant and therefore do not meet the screen positive criteria.

Two maneuvers commonly employed for diagnosis in neonatal exams are the Ortolani maneuver and the Barlow maneuver.

In order to do the Ortolani maneuver it is recommended that the examiner put the newborn baby in a position in which the opposite hip is held still while the thigh of the hip being tested is abducted and gently pulled anteriorly. If a "clunk" is heard (the sound of the femoral head moving over the acetabulum), the joint is normal, but absence of the "clunk" sound indicates that the acetabulum is not fully developed. The next method that can be used is called the Barlow maneuver. It is done by adducting the hip while pushing the thigh posteriorly. If the hip goes out of the socket it means it is dislocated, and the newborn has a congenital hip dislocation. The baby is laid on its back for examination by separation of its legs. If a clicking sound can be heard, it indicates that the baby may have a dislocated hip. It is highly recommended that these maneuvers be done when the baby is not fussing, because the baby may inhibit hip movement.. Overall, the latest evidence suggests that clinical screening tests are not sufficiently reliable for diagnosing developmental dysplasia of the hip.

There is some evidence suggesting that hip examinations in newborns are painful and pain relief in the form of oral glucose has been suggested but is not yet widely accepted.

Most vexingly, many newborn hips show a certain ligamentous laxity, on the other hand severely malformed joints can appear stable. That is one reason why follow-up exams and developmental monitoring are important. Physical examination of newborns followed by appropriate use of hip ultrasound is widely accepted.

The Harris hip score (developed by William H. Harris MD, an orthopedist from Massachusetts) is one way to evaluate hip function following surgery. Other scoring methods are based on patients' evaluation like e.g. the Oxford hip score, HOOS and WOMAC score. Children's Hospital Oakland Hip Evaluation Scale (CHOHES) is a modification of the Harris hip score that is currently being evaluated.

Despite screening all newborns, many cases of hip dysplasia are not diagnosed until adolescence or adulthood. This populations may present with hip pain, labral tears, and early osteoarthritic changes. X-rays are used to confirm a diagnosis of hip dysplasia. CT scans and MRI scans are also used to assess to extent of deformity in three-dimensional space and concominant injuries, such as labral tears or articular cartilage degradation.

=== Terminology ===
Some sources prefer "developmental dysplasia of the hip" (DDH) to "congenital dislocation of the hip" (CDH), finding the latter term insufficiently flexible in describing the diversity of potential complications.

The use of the word "congenital" can also imply that the condition already exists at birth. This terminology introduces challenges, because the joint in a newborn is formed from cartilage and is still malleable, making the onset difficult to ascertain. The newer term DDH also encompasses occult dysplasia (e.g. an underdeveloped joint) without dislocation and a dislocation developing after the "newborn" phase.

The term is not used consistently. In pediatric/neonatal orthopedics, it is used to describe unstable/dislocatable hips and poorly developed acetabula. For adults, it describes hips showing abnormal femur head or acetabular x-rays.

Some sources prefer the term "hip dysplasia" over DDH, considering it to be "simpler and more accurate", partly because of the redundancy created by the use of the terms developmental and dysplasia. Types of DDH include subluxation, dysplasia, and dislocation. The main types are the result of either laxity of the supporting capsule or an abnormal acetabulum.

=== Imaging ===
Hip dysplasia can be diagnosed by ultrasound and projectional radiography ("X-ray"). Ultrasound imaging is generally preferred at up to 4 months due to limited ossification of the femoral head up until then, and is the most accurate method for imaging of the hip during the first few months after birth. However, in most instances, ultrasound screening should not be performed before 3 to 4 weeks of age because of the normal physiologic laxity. (Note: Ultrasonography is the imaging method of choice up to 6 months for the nonoperative surveillance imaging in harness of known diagnosis of DDH.: "ACR Appropriateness Criteria - Developmental Dysplasia of the Hip (DDH)–Child". American College of Radiology. Revised 2018) When universal with targeted ultrasound screening was compared, the former results in an insignificant reduction in the late diagnosis of hip dysplasia, which is why universal ultrasonographic screening of newborn infants is not recommended by the American Academy of Pediatrics.

Despite the widespread use of ultrasound, pelvis X-ray is still frequently used to diagnose or monitor hip dysplasia or for assessing other congenital conditions or bone tumors.

American College of Radiology Appropriateness Criteria for hip dysplasia
Age	Scenario	Usual appropriate initial imaging
<4 weeks	Equivocal physical examination or risk factors	No imaging
<4 weeks	Physical findings of DDH	Ultrasonography
4 weeks - 4 months	Equivocal physical examination or risk factors	Ultrasonography
4 – 6 months	Concern for DDH	X-ray. Ultrasonography may be appropriate
>6 months		X-ray

The most useful lines and angles that can be drawn in the pediatric pelvis assessing hip dysplasia are as follows: Different measurements are used in adults.

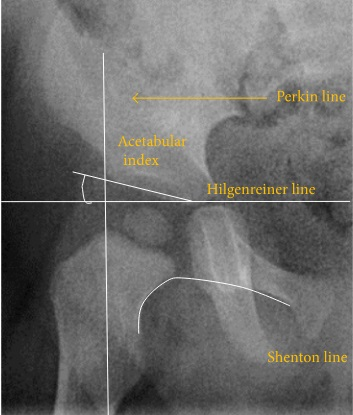
Normal hip.

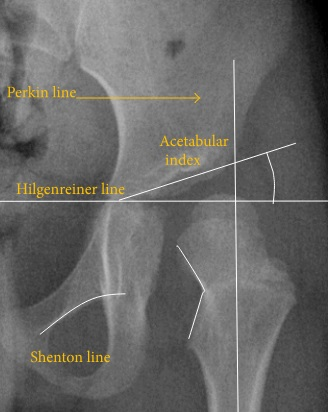
Hip dysplasia.

== Treatment ==
Hip dysplasia presents a nearly perfect equilibrium between the arthritis, movement/mobility problems and pain associated with the developmental malformation, and the arthritis, movement/mobility problems and pain that are, as often as not in moderate to severe cases, inflicted by the treatment itself.

However, given the very real possibility of a limp, constant and/or debilitating pain, complicated treatment and impaired mobility later in life, careful developmental monitoring is indicated and early intervention is often the best result. The worst possible consequence of non treatment is developing early arthritis, sometimes even during teenage years. All treatment aims to delay the onset of arthritis, but no treatment is fully successful in avoiding it; and, all available treatments bear the risk of inflicting equivalent damage. Most unfortunately, studies have as yet been unable to find a method of predicting outcomes in either the surgical/orthopedic treatment of the condition in infants and young children, or the surgical treatment of these early treatments' negative outcomes later in life (such as arthritis, avascular necrosis, trochanteric bursitis, and bone spurs of up to 3.5 cm just medial of the gluteus maximus insertion point on the greater trochanter due to excessive friction).

=== Harnesses, casts, and traction ===
Early hip dysplasia can often be treated using a Pavlik harness (see photograph) or the Frejka pillow/splint in the first year of life with usually normal results. Complications can occur when using the Pavlik harness. Cases of femoral nerve palsy and avascular necrosis of the femoral head have been reported with the use of the Pavlik harness, but whether these cases were due to improper application of the device or a complication encountered in the course of the disorder remains unresolved. Complications arise mainly because the sheet of the iliopsoas muscle pushes the circumflex artery against the neck of the femur and decreases blood flow to the femoral head, so the Frejka pillow is not indicated in all the forms of the developmental dysplasia of the hip.

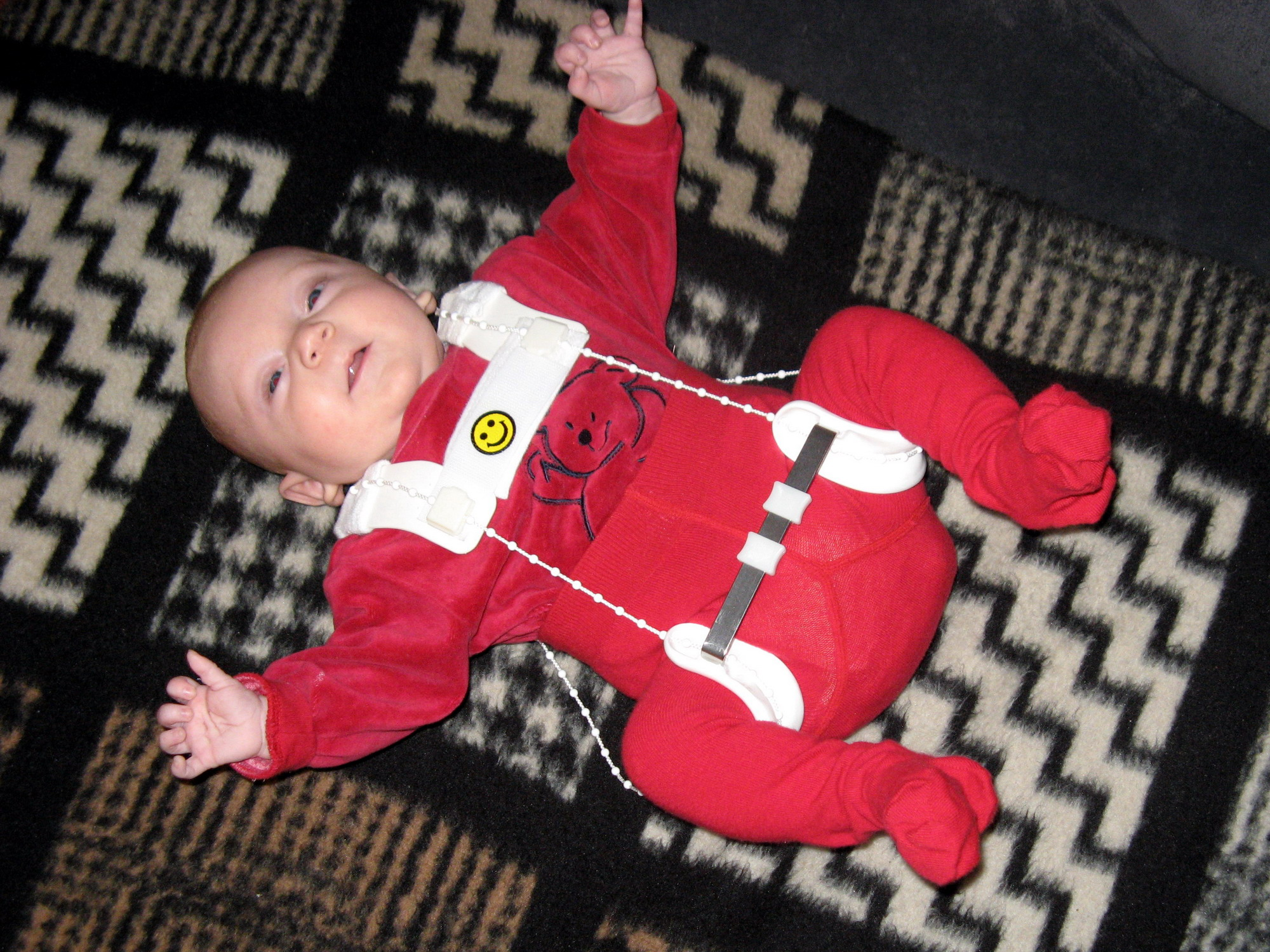
Baby wearing a Pavlik harness

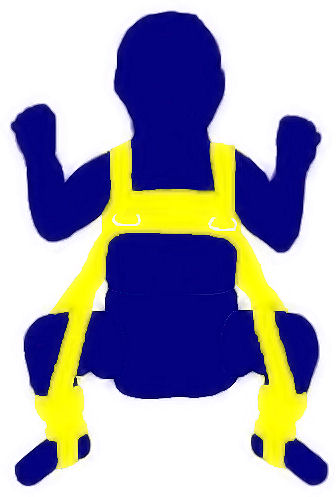
Diagram of Pavlik harness

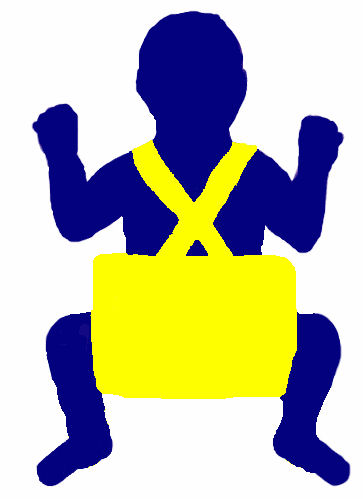
Diagram of Frejka pillow

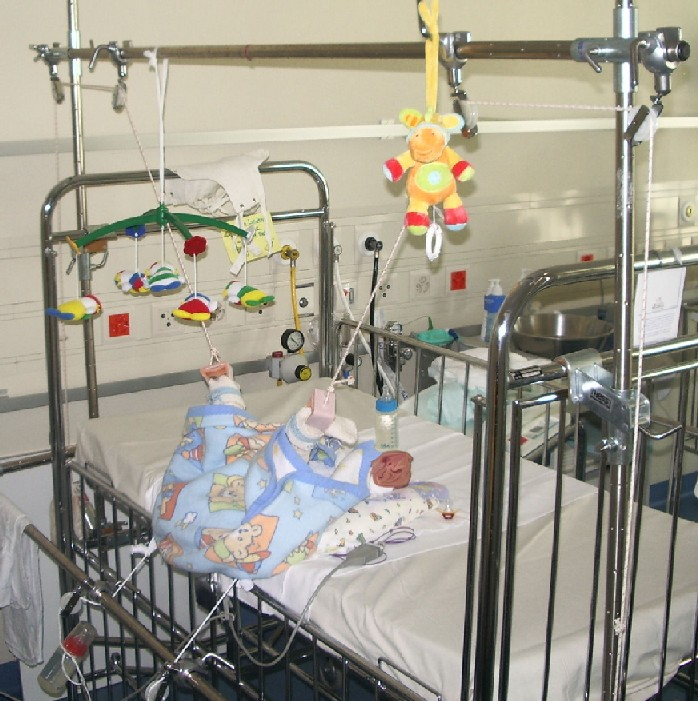
Traction

Other devices employed include the spica cast, particularly following surgical closed reduction, open reduction, or osteotomy in babies and young children. Traction is sometimes used in the weeks leading up to a surgery to help stretch ligaments in the hip joint, although its use is controversial and varies amongst physicians.

=== Surgery ===
In older children the adductor and iliopsoas muscles may have to be treated surgically because they adapt to the dislocated joint position (contracture). Braces and splints are often used following either of these methods to continue treatment. Although some children "outgrow" untreated mild hip dysplasia and some forms of untreated dysplasia cause little or no impairment of quality of life, studies have as yet been unable to find a method of predicting outcomes. On the other hand, it has often been documented that starting treatment late leads to complications and ends in poor results.

Periacetabular osteotomy (PAO)

Hip dysplasia is increasingly being recognized as a cause of hip pain in young adults. In this population periacetabular osteotomy (PAO) surgery is performed to realign the acetabulum, or hip socket, within the pelvis to increase coverage of the femoral head, or hip ball. PAO is shown to decrease pain, improve function, and improve quality of life in this population.

==== Hip replacement ====
Hip dysplasia is often cited as causing osteoarthritis of the hip at a comparatively young age, if not adequately treated. Dislocated load bearing surfaces lead to increased and unusual wear, although there are studies that contradict these findings (see). After osteoarthritis begin to develop total hip replacement is the best surgical treatment option to replace the ball and socket joint to create more coverage of the hip using the new ball and socket implants used in hip replacements.

Hip resurfacing can be another option for correcting hip dysplasia in adults. It is a type of hip replacement that preserves more bone, and may work for younger hip dysplasia patients.

== Epidemiology ==
Determining the incidence can be difficult. In addition there is a wide margin in diagnostic results. A German study comparing two methods resulted in twice the usual rate for one method. The condition is eight times more frequent in females than in males.

Native Americans are more likely to have congenital hip dislocation than any other group. The risk for Native Americans is about 25–50 in 1000. The overall frequency of developmental dysplasia of the hip is approximately 1 case per 1000 individuals; however, Barlow believed that the incidence of hip instability in newborns can be as high as 1 case for every 60 newborns, with the rate dropping to 1:240 at one week.

== History ==
The Frejka pillow splint is named after Bedřich Frejka. The Pavlik harness is named after Arnold Pavlík. Both were Czech orthopedic surgeons.

== Society and culture ==
In the television program ER, Kerry Weaver uses a crutch owing to congenital hip dysplasia. In season 12, she undergoes a hip replacement to cure her dysplasia when her previously untreated joint worsens.

== Research ==
One avenue of research is using stem cells. They are applied in grafting (bone grafting) or by seeding porous arthroplasty prosthesis with autologous fibroblasts or chondrocyte progenitor cells to assist in firmly anchoring the artificial material in the bone bed.

== Other animals ==
In dogs, hip dysplasia is an abnormal formation of the hip socket that, in its more severe form, can eventually cause crippling lameness and painful arthritis of the joints. It is a genetic (polygenic) trait that is affected by environmental factors. It is common in many dog breeds, particularly the larger breeds.

Hip dysplasia is one of the most studied veterinary conditions in dogs, and the most common single cause of arthritis of the hips. Cats are also known to have this condition, especially Siamese.
