= Orto =

Orto may refer to:

- Orto, Corse-du-Sud, a commune on the island of Corsica
- Orto (company), an Estonian publishing company
