= Ortolani test =

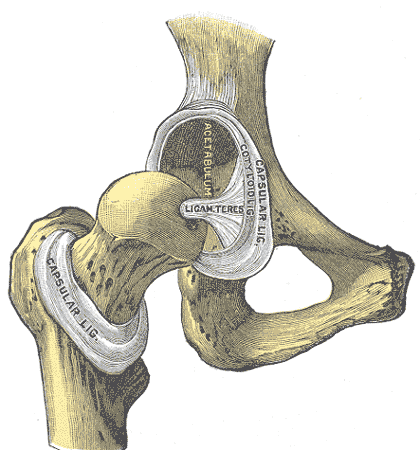
- Hip-joint, front view.
- Synonyms: Ortolani maneuver
- Purpose: exam developmental dysplasia of the hip

The Ortolani test is part of the physical examination for developmental dysplasia of the hip, along with the Barlow maneuver. Specifically, the Ortolani test is positive when a posterior dislocation of the hip is reducible with this maneuver. This is part of the standard infant exam performed preferably in early infancy.The Ortolani test is named after Marino Ortolani, who developed it in 1937.

== Procedure ==
The Ortolani test is performed with the Barlow maneuver and inspection of the hip joint and legs. It relocates the dislocation of the hip joint that has just been elicited by the Barlow maneuver.

The Ortolani test is performed by an examiner first flexing the hips and knees of a supine infant to 90°, then with the examiner's index fingers placing anterior pressure on the greater trochanters, gently and smoothly abducting the infant's legs using the examiner's thumbs.

== Interpretation ==
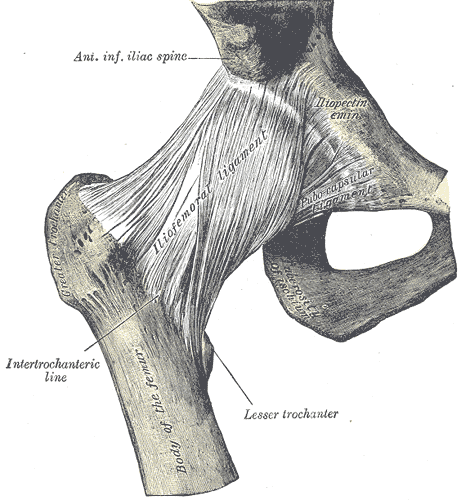
Right hip-joint from the front.

A positive sign is a distinctive 'clunk' which can be heard and felt as the femoral head relocates anteriorly into the acetabulum:.

Studies show that Ortolani and Barlow are moderately sensitive (sensitivity 46%, 95% CI, 26%-67%) and highly specific (specificity 99.1%, 95% CI, 97.9%-99.6%) for the diagnosis of developmental dysplasia of the hip.
