= Bononcini =

Bononcini is a surname. Notable people with the surname include:

- Antonio Maria Bononcini (1677–1726), Italian cellist and composer
- Giovanni Bononcini (1670–1747), Italian Baroque composer, cellist, singer, and teacher
- Giovanni Maria Bononcini (1642–1678), Italian violinist and composer, father of both of the above.
