= Pavel Černoch =

Czech operatic tenor

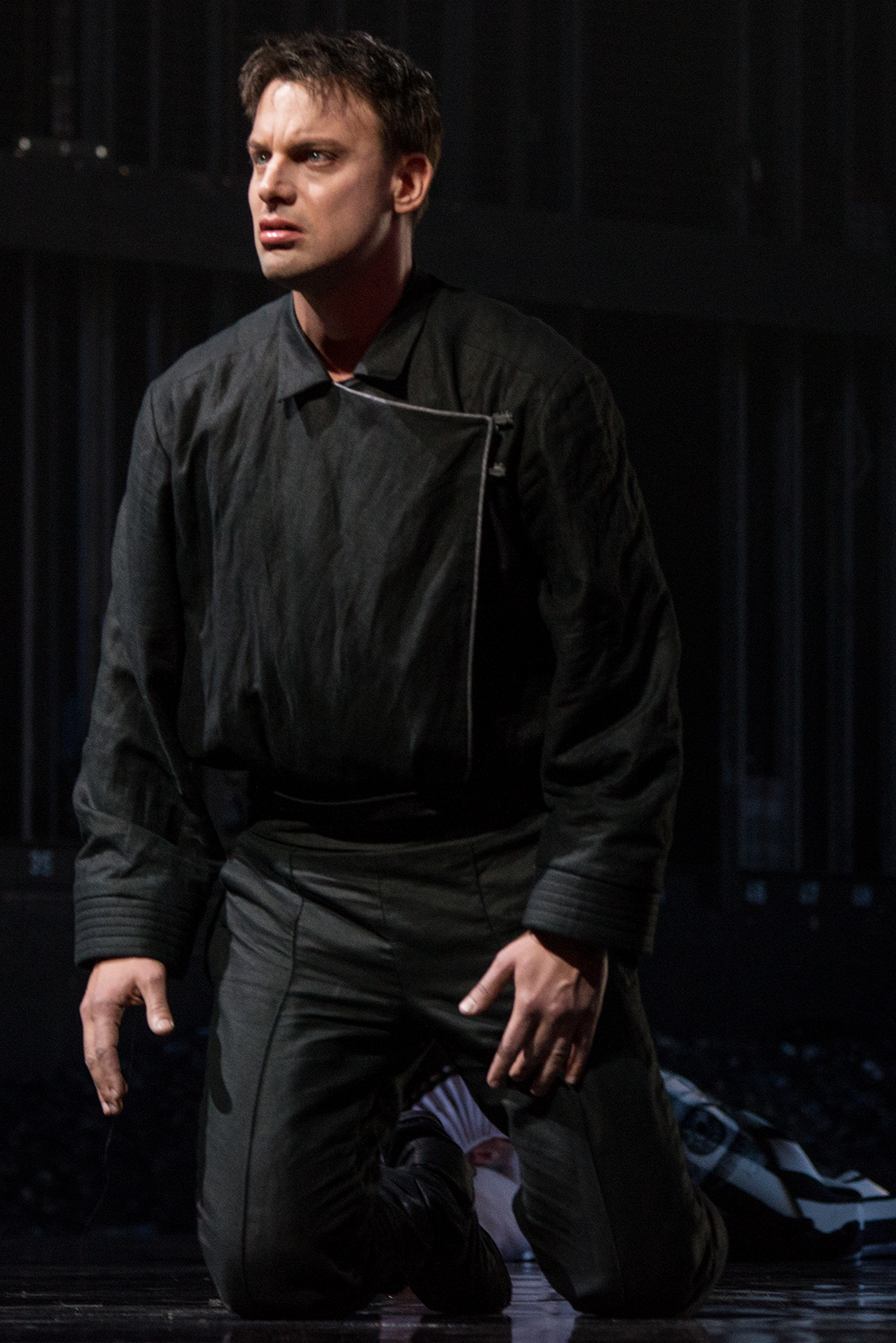
As Amleto at the 2016 Bregenz Festival

Pavel Černoch is a Czech operatic tenor.

== Life and career ==
Born in Brno, Černoch sang in the Cantilena Chamber Choir as a child and later studied at the Janáček Academy of Music and Performing Arts in his hometown. He continued his vocal training with Paolo de Napoli in Florence and attended master class in Italy. Paolo de Napoli still supports Černoch with voice training.

The singer made his debut at the Janáček Theatre in Brno in Mozart's The Magic Flute and was engaged to Prague, Riga, Cagliari, Athens, the Graz Opera and the Vienna Volksoper.

=== Opera ===
Černoch has appeared in a number of operas by his compatriot Leoš Janáček - as Boris Grigorjevic in Káťa Kabanová at the Berlin and Stuttgart State Operas; as Steva and Laca Clemen in Jenůfa in Munich, Riga, Stuttgart and Zurich and as Albert Gregor in Věc Makropulos, again in Munich. From the Czech repertoire also come the roles of Michelis in Martinů's The Greek Passion, the Prince in Antonín Dvořák's Rusalka, which he has performed in Brussels, Zurich, Glyndebourne, Naples, Paris and Riga, and the Jenik in Bedřich Smetana's The Bartered Bride, which he sang at the Opéra National de Paris. From the Russian repertoire, Černoch sings Vladimir in Alexander Porfiryevich Borodin's Prince Igor, Lykov in Rimsky-Korsakov's The Tsar's Bride and two Tchaikovsky roles - Lensky in Eugene Onegin and Vaudémont in Iolanta. He made his debut with the latter role in January 2012 at the Teatro Real in Madrid, directed by Peter Sellars and conducted by Teodor Currentzis.

Černoch defines his repertoire in the middle of the triangle lyric tenor, Jugendlicher Heldentenor and tenorespinto - with a clear focus on the Italian and French operatic oeuvre of the late 19th and early 20th centuries. He sings Alfredo in La traviata by Verdi, Gabriele Adorno in Simon Boccanegra as well as the title role of Don Carlos by Verdi, Pinkerton in Madama Butterfly and Rodolfo in La Bohème, Don José in Bizet's Carmen, Roméo in Gounod's Roméo et Juliette, and the title roles in two French "Faust. A Tragedy" settings : Gounod's Faust and Berlioz La damnation de Faust. However, the singer cancelled his planned 2016 debut in the title role of Jacques Offenbach's Les Contes d'Hoffmann at the Staatstheater Stuttgart. The singer's excursions into the German genre are limited to Lyonel in Friedrich von Flotow's Martha. He sang Don Ottavio in Mozart's Don Giovanni, Alfred in Johann Strauss II's Die Fledermaus and Simon in Carl Millöcker's Der Bettelstudent.

His stage partners include Anja Harteros, Karita Mattila, Anna Netrebko, Angela Denoke, Eva-Maria Westbroek and Kristīne Opolais.

Since his debut at the Bayerische Staatsoper in Munich in 2009, the tenor has appeared at the Staatsoper im Schiller Theater, the Hamburg State Opera and the Staatstheater Stuttgart, the Cologne Opera and the Opernhaus Zürich, the Théâtre Royal de la Monnaie in Brussels, the Opéra National de Paris as well as the Opéra de Nice and the Opéra de Lyon and several times at the Glyndebourne Festival Opera, furthermore at the Finnish National Opera and Ballet in Helsinki, at the Royal Opera House Muscat in the Sultanate of Oman and at the Bolshoi Theatre in Moscow as well as at the Teatro San Carlo in Naples and at La Scala in Milan.

In 2016, he took on the title role in a new production of Amleto by Arrigo Boito (libretto) and Franco Faccio (composition) at the Bregenz Festival. This was the Austrian premiere and at the same time the first European performance of the forgotten work in 145 years. Černoch was able to achieve great personal success, both as a performer and as a singer. Audiences cheered him, critics praised his portrayal of the sad Prince of Denmark. In 2016, he also sang his first Don Carlos at the Hamburg State Opera. In 2017, followed among others Vladimir in Prince Igo in Amsterdam, Lenski and Don Carlos at the Opéra Bastille Paris as well as in La damnation de Faust in Rome. In 2018, he made his role debut as Cavaradossi in Athens as well as his debut at the Vienna State Opera, again as Lenski in Eugene Onegin.

From 2019, debuts at the Royal Opera London and Metropolitan Opera New York are announced. In 2019, he added Sergey in Shostakovich's Lady Macbeth of Mtsensk to his repertoire, performing the role at Opéra National de Paris.

=== Concert ===
Černoch also sings regularly in the concert hall, having been invited by the BBC Proms, the Bergen Festival, the Verbier Festival, the City of Birmingham Symphony Orchestra and Boston Symphony Orchestra. In Antwerp, Ghent and Stuttgart he sang the tenor solo in Verdi's Requiem, in London and Zurich thee Glagolitic Mass by Leoš Janáček, in Boston the choral symphony Kolokola op. 35 by Sergei Rachmaninoff. He works with conductors Daniel Barenboim, Jiří Bělohlávek, Charles Dutoit, John Eliot Gardiner, Daniele Gatti, Tomáš Hanus, Jakub Hrůša, Andris Nelsons, Kirill Petrenko, Simon Rattle, Gennady Rozhdestvensky and Vassily Sinaisky.

== Recordings ==
- Antonín Dvořák: Rusalka, Oper in drei Akten, aus dem Théâtre Royal de la Monnaie (Brüssel), 2014. Conductor: Julian Hubbard, with Myrtó Papatanasiu, Pavel Černoch, Annalena Persson, Willard White, Renée Morloc, EuroArts
- Bohuslav Martinů: Řecké pašije, H. 372, Oper in vier Akten, 13 April 2006 (live aus dem Prager Nationaltheater, Londoner Erstfassung): Jiří Bělohlávek (conductor), Orchester des Prager Nationaltheaters. Mit Luděk Vele (Grigoris), Aleš Hendrych (Patriarcheas), Václav Knop (Ladas), Pavel Černoch (Michelis), František Zahradníček (Kostandis), Jan Vacík (Yannakos), Tomás Cerný (Manolios), Karel Černoch (Nikolio), Jan Markvart (Andonis), Maida Hundeling (Katerina), Jaroslav Březina (Panait), Petra Nótová (Lenio), Lenka Šmidová (Alte Frau), Roman Janál (Fotis), Hana Jonášová (Despinio), Miroslav Podskalsky (Alter Mann).
- Tchaikovsky: Iolanta, 2012. From the Teatro Real de Madrid, conductor: Teodor Currentzis, Inszenierung: Peter Sellars. With Ekaterina Scherbachenko, Pavel Černoch. DVD.
- Tchaikovsky: Cherevichki, komisch-phantastische Oper in vier Akten, Januar 2000 (live from Cagliari): Gennady Rozhdestvensky (conductor), Orchester und Chor des Teatro Lirico di Cagliari. With Valerij Popov (Wakula), Ludmilla Schemtschuk (Solocha), Albert Schagidullin (Teufel und Zeremonienmeister), Vladimir Ognovenko (Tschub), Ekaterina Morosova (Oksana), Barseg Tumanyan (Pan Golowa), Valentin Okenko (Panas), Grigory Osipov (Durchlaucht), Pavel Černoch (Diensthabender), Frantisek Zahradnicek (Alter Saporoger), Fabio Bonavita (Stimme des Waldteufels). Dynamic CDS 287/1-3 (3 CD).
