= Filippo Marchetti =

Italian composer

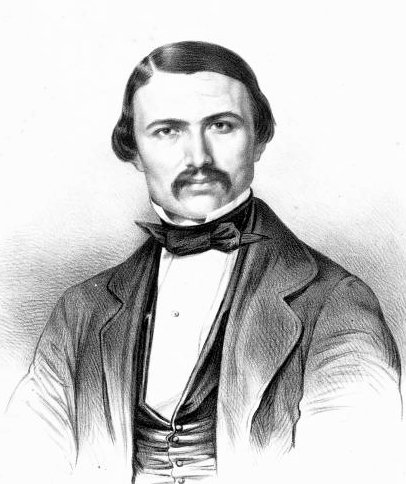
Filippo Marchetti

Filippo Marchetti (26 February 1831, Bolognola, Macerata – 18 January 1902, Rome) was an Italian opera composer. After studying in Naples, his first opera was "successfully premiered" in Turin in 1856. With only limited success, he became a teacher of singing and composition in Rome before composing Romeo e Giulietta for a premiere in Trieste in 1865.

Overshadowed like other Italian opera composers of his period by the genius of Verdi, Marchetti achieved one great success with his 1869 opera - Ruy Blas - which was based on Victor Hugo's play, Ruy Blas. It has been noted that "it was one of the first Italian operas to show the influence of French grand opera, partly, no doubt in response to its French source". The opera was performed into the 20th Century.

== Major works ==
- Gentile da Varano, February 1856, Turin
- La demente, 27 November 1856, Turin
- Il paria, 1859
- Romeo e Giulietta, 25 October 1865, Trieste; revised 1872 and 1876.
- Ruy Blas, 3 April 1869, Milan.
- Gustavo Wasa, 7 February 1875, Milan.
- Don Giovanni d'Austria, 11 March 1880, Turin

== Recordings ==
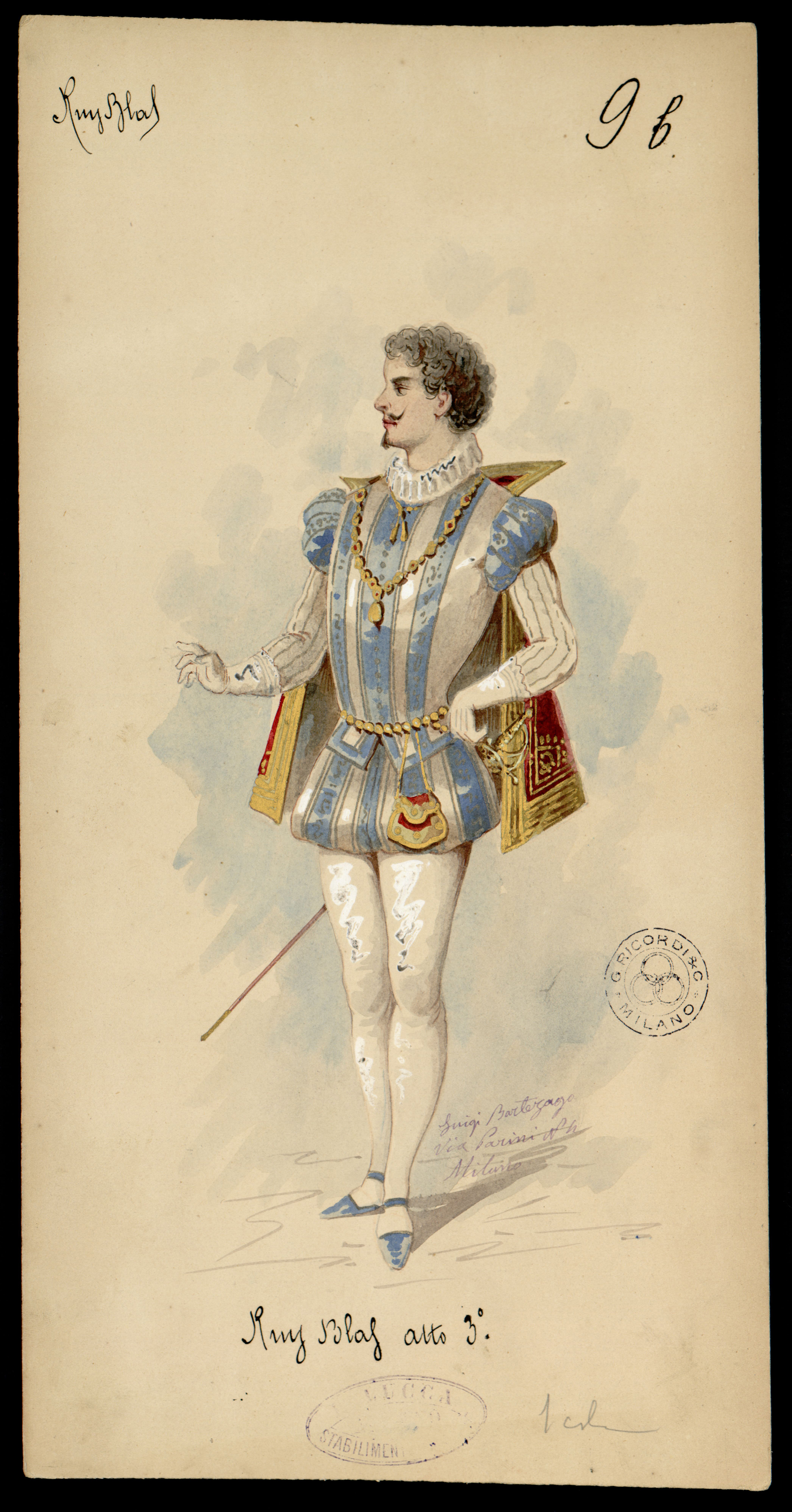
Ruy Blas, costume design for Ruy Blas act 3 (1872).

- Romeo e Giulietta. With Daolio, Portoghese, Coletta, Cassi, and Dolari. Cond: Yurkevych. Audio CD: Dynamic, Cat: CDS 501/1-2.
- Ruy Blas with Theodossiou, Marini, Malagnini, Gazale, Moncini. Cond: Lipton. Audio CD: Bongiovanni, Cat: GB 2237/38-2.
