= Paolo Carignani =

Italian conductor (born 1961)

Paolo Carignani (born 1961) is an Italian conductor. From 2021 to 2024, he served as chief conductor of the Royal Danish Orchestra in Copenhagen.

He has been chief conductor of the Opern- und Schauspielhaus Frankfurt (1999–2008), and season conductor of the Frankfurter Opern- und Museumsorchester.

== Selected discography and videography ==
- Puccini's Tosca with Emily Magee, Jonas Kaufmann and Thomas Hampson for the Zürich Opera 2009, DVD Decca 2011. OCLC 727732051
- Verdi's The Sicilian vespers : Paolo Carignani (conductor), Christof Loy (stage director) – With Barbara Haveman (Hélène), Burkhard Fritz (Henri) and Alejandro Marco-Buhrmester (Guy de Montfort), 2010, OCLC 1125950432
- Live-Mitschnitt des 5. Montags-Konzertes, 13. Januar 2003, Alte Oper Frankfurt, 2004, OCLC 1187849854
- Live-Mitschnitt des 7. Montags-Konzertes, 18. März 2002, Alte Oper Frankfurt, 2003, OCLC 1187405901

Cultural offices
Preceded by Sylvain Cambreling	General Music Director, Frankfurt Opera; 1999–2008	Succeeded by Sebastian Weigle
